= List of railway stations in North Korea =

List of railway stations in North Korea. Closed stations are not included.

== Alphabetical list ==
Station name (Chosŏn'gŭl)	Province	Line
Adukhyŏng (아둑형)	Chagang	Kanggye Line
Amrokkang (압록강)	North P'yŏngan	Amrokkang Line
Anbyŏn (안변)	Kangwŏn	Kangwŏn Line, Kŭmgangsan Ch'ŏngnyŏn Line
Anch'an (안찬)	Chagang	Manp'o Line
An'gol (안골)	Chagang	An'gol Line
Anju (안주)	North P'yŏngan	Kaech'ŏn Line
Chaedŏk (재덕)	North Hamgyŏng	Paektusan Ch'ŏngnyŏn Line
Chaedong (재동)	South P'yŏngan	Chaedong Line
Chaeryŏng (재령)	South Hwanghae	Ŭnnyul Line
Chagang Samgang (자강삼강)	Chagang	Pukpu Line
Ch'agap'yŏng (차가평)	Chagang	Pukpu Line
Ch'aho (차호)	South Hamgyŏng	Riwŏn Line
Chajak (자작)	South P'yŏngan	Kaech'ŏn Colliery Line, Manp'o Line
Chamjilli (잠질리)	South P'yŏngan	Chamjilli Line
Changbang (장방)	South Hwanghae	Hwanghae Ch'ŏngnyŏn Line, Paech'ŏn Line
Changch'ŏlli (장천리)	North Hwanghae	Songrim Line
Changdong (장동)	North Hamgyŏng	Kowŏn Colliery Line
Ch'angdong (창동)	South P'yŏngan	Ch'ŏngnam Line
Ch'angdu (창두)	North Hamgyŏng	Hambuk Line
Changdun (장둔)	South Hwanghae	Ongjin Line
Ch'anghŭng (창흥)	South Hamgyŏng	Ch'anghŭng Line
Changhŭng (창흥)	North Hamgyŏng	Hambuk Line
Changhŭng (창흥)	South Hamgyŏng	Sinhŭng Line
Changjin (장진)	South Hamgyŏng	Changjin Line
Changp'a (장파)	South Hamgyŏng	Hŏch'ŏn Line
Changp'yŏng (장평)	North Hamgyŏng	P'yŏngra Line
Ch'angp'yŏng (창평)	North Hamgyŏng	Hambuk Line
Ch'angp'yŏng (창평)	Chagang	Manp'o Line
Changrim (장림)	South P'yŏngan	P'yŏngra Line
Changsang (장상)	South P'yŏngan	Changsang Line
Changsŏn'gang (장선강)	South P'yŏngan	Changsŏn'gang
Changyŏn (장연)	South Hwanghae	Changyŏn Line
Ch'aryŏng (차령)	North Hamgyŏng	Musan Line
Chasan (자산)	South P'yŏngan	P'yŏngra Line
Chasŏng (자성)	Chagang	Pukpu Line
Chenam (제남)	South P'yŏngan	P'yŏngdŏk Line
Chihari (지하리)	Kangwŏn	Ch'ŏngnyŏn Ich'ŏn Line
Chiktong Colliery (직동탄광)	South P'yŏngan	Chiktong Colliery Line
Ch'ilgol (칠골)	P'yŏngyang	P'yŏngnam Line
Ch'illi (칠리)	South P'yŏngan	Ch'ŏngnam Line
Ch'ilmansan (칠만산)	South Hwanghae	Hwanghae Ch'ŏngnyŏn Line
Ch'imch'on (침촌)	North Hwanghae	P'yŏngbu Line
Ch'imgyo (침교)	North Hwanghae	Ch'ŏngnyŏn Ich'ŏn Line
Chinp'yŏng (진평)	Chagang	Manp'o Line
Chisang (지상)	Kangwŏn	Ch'ŏngnyŏn Ich'ŏn Line
Chisu (지수)	South P'yŏngan	P'yŏngra Line
Chŏkchi (적지)	Rasŏn	Hongŭi Line
Ch'ŏlgisan (철기산)	South P'yŏngan	Hoedun Line, Hyŏngbong Line, Sŏch'ang Line
Ch'ŏlgwang (철광)	Namp'o	Sŏhae Kammun Line, Sŏhaeri Line, Ŭnnyul Line
Ch'ŏlsan (철산)	North P'yŏngan	Ch'ŏlsan Line
Ch'ŏlsong Ch'ŏngnyŏn (철송청년)	North Hamgyŏng	Musan Line, Musan Mining Line
Chomaksan (조막산)	North Hamgyŏng	P'yŏngra Line
Ch'ŏnbulsan (천불산)	South Hamgyŏng	Sinhŭng Line
Chŏnch'ŏn (전천)	Chagang	Manp'o Line
Ch'ŏndong (천동)	South P'yŏngan	Manp'o Line, Taegak Line
Chŏngbangri (정방리)	North Hwanghae	P'yŏngbu Line
Ch'ŏngbong (정봉)	North Hwanghae	Ch'ŏngnyŏn Ich'ŏn Line
Ch'ŏngch'ŏn'gang (청천강)	North P'yŏngan	Kubongsan Line, P'yŏngŭi Line
Ch'ŏngdan (청단)	South Hwanghae	Paech'ŏn Line
Chŏngdo Station	South Hwanghae	Chŏngdo Line
Ch'ŏnggang (청강)	North P'yŏngan	P'yŏngŭi Line
Ch'ŏnggye (청계)	North Hwanghae	P'yŏngbu Line
Ch'ŏnghak (청학)	Rasŏn	Hambuk Line
Chŏnggwang (정광)	North P'yŏngan	Tŏkhyŏn Line
Ch'ŏnghwaryŏk (청화력)	North P'yŏngan	Ch'ŏnghwaryŏk Line
Ch'ŏngjin Choch'ajang (Ch'ŏngjin Marshalling Yard) (청진조차장)	North Hamgyŏng	Kangdŏk Line
Ch'ŏngjin Ch'ŏngnyŏn (청진청년)	North Hamgyŏng	Ch'ŏngjin Port Line, Hambuk Line, P'yŏngra Line
Ch'ŏngjinhang (Ch'ŏngjin Port) (청진항)	North Hamgyŏng	Ch'ŏngjin Port Line
Ch'ŏngju Ch'ŏngnyŏn (정주청년)	North P'yŏngan	P'yŏngbuk Line, P'yŏngŭi Line
Chŏngmulli (정문리)	North P'yŏngan	Tŏkhyŏn Line
Ch'ŏngmunch'on (정문촌)	South Hwanghae	Sŏhaeri Line
Chŏngnam (정남)	North Hamgyŏng	Kogŏnwŏn Line
Ch'ŏngnam (청남)	South P'yŏngan	Ch'ŏngnam Line, Sŏhae Line
Ch'ŏn'gok (천곡)	South Hamgyŏng	Kŭmgol Line
Chŏn'gŏri (전거리)	North Hamgyŏng	Hambuk Line
Chŏngp'yŏng (정평)	South Hamgyŏng	P'yŏngra Line
Ch'ŏngryong (청룡)	P'yŏngyang	Myŏngdang Line, P'yŏngdŏk Line
Chongsŏng (종성)	North Hamgyŏng	Hambuk Line, Tongp'o Line
Ch'ŏngsu (청수)	North P'yŏngan	P'yŏngbuk Line
Ch'ŏnha (천하)	Chagang	Manp'o Line
Chŏnjin (정진)	South P'yŏngan	Kaech'ŏn Colliery Line
Ch'ŏnnae (천내)	Kangwŏn	Ch'ŏnnae Line
Chŏnp'yŏng (전평)	Chagang	Pukpu Line
Ch'ŏnsŏng (천성)	South P'yŏngan	Ch'ŏnsŏng Colliery Line
Ch'ŏnsu (천수)	Ryanggang	Paengmu Line
Ch'ŏntae (천태)	South Hwanghae	Paech'ŏn Line
Chŏnt'an (전탄)	Kangwŏn	Kangwŏn Line
Ch'ŏn'ŭl (천을)	South Hamgyŏng	P'yŏngra Line
Chŏp'yŏng (초평)	South P'yŏngan	Taegŏn Line
Ch'osang (초상)	Chagang	Manp'o Line
Choyang T'an'gwang (Choyang Colliery) (조양탄광)	South P'yŏngan	Choyang Colliery Line
Chuch'o (주초)	North Hamgyŏng	Musan Line
Ch'udong (추동)	South Hamgyŏng	Hŏch'ŏn Line
Ch'ukchŏn (축전)	South Hamgyŏng	P'yŏngra Line
Ch'undu (춘두)	North Hamgyŏng	Ch'undu Line
Chungbong (중봉)	North Hamgyŏng	Sech'ŏn Line
Chungch'on (중촌)	South Hamgyŏng	Hŏch'ŏn Line
Chungdo (중도)	North Hamgyŏng	Hambuk Line
Chunghwa (중화)	North Hwanghae	P'yŏngbu Line
Chung'i (중이)	P'yŏngyang	P'yŏngra Line
Chungp'yŏng (중평)	South P'yŏngan	Manp'o Line
Chŭngsalli (증산리)	South P'yŏngan	Taegŏn Line
Chŭngsan (증산)	South Hamgyŏng	P'yŏngra Line, Riwŏn Line
Chungsŏnggan (Middle Sŏnggan) (중성간)	Chagang	Manp'o Line
Chunhyŏngri (준혁리)	South P'yŏngan	Chunhyŏk Line
Chusŏ (주서)	South Hamgyŏng	P'yŏngra Line
Hach'o (하초)	North P'yŏngan	Ch'ŏngnyŏn P'arwŏn Line
Hadan (하단)	North P'yŏngan	P'yŏngŭi Line
Hadŏk (하덕)	South Hamgyŏng	Sŏho Line
Haeju Ch'ŏngnyŏn (해주청년)	South Hwanghae	Hwanghae Ch'ŏngnyŏn Line, Ongjin Line
Hagich'ŏn (하기천)	South Hamgyŏng	Changjin Line
Hahonggun (Lower Honggun) (하홍군)	South Hamgyŏng	Hŏch'ŏn Line
Hahwangt'o (Lower Hwangt'o) (하황토)	Ryanggang	Paengmu Line
Hakhyŏn (학현)	South Hwanghae	Hwanghae Ch'ŏngnyŏn Line
Hakp'o (학포)	North Hamgyŏng	Hambuk Line
Haksan (학산)	South P'yŏngan	Maebong Line, Ŭnsan Line
Haksong (학송)	North Hamgyŏng	Hambuk Line, Hoeam Line
Haksŏng (학성)	North Hamgyŏng	P'yŏngra Line
Hamga (함가)	North P'yŏngan	P'yŏngdŏk Line
Hamhŭng (함흥)	South Hamgyŏng	P'yŏngra Line, Sinhŭng Line, Sŏho Line
Hamhŭng Chocha'jang (Hamhŭng Marshalling Yard) (함흥조차)	South Hamgyŏng	Pinallon Line, P'yŏngra Line
Hamjiwŏn (함지원)	South Hamgyŏng	Sinhŭng Line
Hamju (함주)	South Hamgyŏng	P'yŏngra Line
Hamyŏn (하면)	North Hamgyŏng	Hambuk Line
Hanp'o (한포)	North Hwanghae	P'yŏngbu Line
Hapsu (합수)	Ryanggang	Paektusan Ch'ŏngnyŏn Line
Hasinwŏn (Lower Sinwŏn) (하신원)	Chagang	Kanggye Line
Hasŏng (하성)	South Hwanghae	Hwanghae Ch'ŏngnyŏn Line
Haunsŭng (하운승)	South Hamgyŏng	Hŏch'ŏn Line
Hŏch'ŏn (허천)	South Hamgyŏng	Hŏch'ŏn Line, Mandŏk Line
Hoeam (회암)	North Hamgyŏng	Hoeam Line
Hoean (회안)	South P'yŏngan	P'yŏngdŏk Line
Hoedun Station	South P'yŏngan	Hoedun Line
Hoejung (회중)	Chagang	Pukpu Line
Hoeryŏng Ch'ŏngnyŏn (회령청년)	North Hamgyŏng	Hambuk Line, Hoeryŏng Colliery Line
Hoeyang (회양)	Ryanggang	Pukpu Line
Honggun (홍군)	South Hamgyŏng	Hŏch'ŏn Line
Honghyŏn (홍현)	South Hwanghae	Paech'ŏn Line
Hongŭi (홍의)	Rasŏn	Hambuk Line, Hongŭi Line
Hongwŏn (홍원)	South Hamgyŏng	P'yŏngra Line
Huch'ang (후창)	Rasŏn	P'yŏngra Line
Hŭich'ŏn Ch'ŏngnyŏn (희천청년)	Chagang	Chup'yŏng Line, Manp'o Line
Huju Ch'ŏngnyŏn (후주청년)	Ryanggang	Pukpu Line
Hŭkkyo (흑교)	North Hwanghae	P'yŏngbu Line
Hŭngam (흥암)	North Hamgyŏng	Paengmu Line
Hŭngnam (흥남)	South Hamgyŏng	Pinallon Line, P'yŏngra Line, Sŏho Line
Hŭngnamhang (Hŭngnam Port) (흥남항)	South Hamgyŏng	Pinallon Line
Hŭngryŏng (흑령)	P'yŏngyang	P'yŏngdŏk Line
Hŭngsu (흥수)	North Hwanghae	P'yŏngbu Line
Hunyung (룬융)	North Hamgyŏng	Hambuk Line
Hup'yŏng Ch'ŏngnyŏn (후평청년)	Kangwŏn	Ch'ŏngnyŏn Ich'ŏn Line
Husan (후산)	Namp'o	Husan Line, Ryonggang Line
Hwaam (화암)	Chagang	Manp'o Line
Hwach'ŏn (화천)	North Hwanghae	P'yŏngdŏk Line
Hwado (화도)	Namp'o	P'yŏngnam Line
Hwajŏn (화전)	Ryanggang	Samjiyŏn Line
Hwangch'oryŏng (황초령)	South Hamgyŏng	Changjin Line
Hwanghae Ryongmun (황해룡문)	South Hwanghae	Ŭnnyul Line
Hwangju (황주)	North Hwanghae	P'yŏngbu Line, Songrim Line
Hwangp'a (황파)	North Hamgyŏng	Hambuk Line
Hwangp'o (황포)	Chagang	Kanggye Line
Hwap'yŏng (화평)	Chagang	Pukpu Line
Hwŏnhwa (훤화)	North P'yŏngan	Map'yŏng Line
Hyangha (향하)	Chagang	Kanggye Line
Hyangjang (향장)	South P'yŏngan	Changsang Line, P'yŏngdŏk Line
Hyangjuk (향죽)	South Hwanghae	Pup'o Line
Hyangwŏn (향원)	South P'yŏngan	P'yŏngdŏk Line
Hyesan Ch'ŏngnyŏn (혜산청년)	Ryanggang	Paektusan Ch'ŏngnyŏn Line, Pukpu Line
Hyŏngbong (형봉)	South P'yŏngan	Hyŏngbong Line
Hyŏngje (형제)	North Hamgyŏng	Hambuk Line
Hyŏnhŭng (현흥)	South Hamgyŏng	P'yŏngra Line
Ich'ŏn Ch'ŏngnyŏn (이천청년)	Kangwŏn	Ch'ŏngnyŏn Ich'ŏn Line
Ilsin (일신)	South Hamgyŏng	P'yŏngra Line
Ilt'an (일탄)	North Hamgyŏng	Ilt'an Line
Ingp'o (잉포)	South P'yŏngan	Ingp'o Line
Inhŭng (인흥)	South Hamgyŏng	P'yŏngra Line
Inp'yŏng (인평)	South P'yŏngan	P'yŏngra Line
Insan (인산)	Ryanggang	Pukpu Line
Kach'ang (가창)	South P'yŏngan	P'yŏngdŏk Line
Kadam (가담)	South Hamgyŏng	Sinhŭng Line
Kaech'ŏn (개천)	South P'yŏngan	Choyang Colliery Line, Chunhyŏk Line, Kaech'ŏn Line, Manp'o Line
Kaego Ch'ŏngnyŏn (개고청년)	Chagang	Manp'o Line
Kaep'ung (개풍)	North Hwanghae	P'yŏngbu Line
Kaesŏng (개성)	North Hwanghae	P'yŏngbu Line
Kag'am (각암)	South P'yŏngan	Manp'o Line
Kalch'ŏn (갈천)	Namp'o	P'yŏngnam Line
Kalli (간리)	P'yŏngyang	P'yŏngra Line, P'yŏngŭi Line, Sijŏng Line
Kalma (갈마)	Kangwŏn	Kangwŏn Line, Wŏnsan Port Line
Kalsan (갈산)	South Hwanghae	Paech'ŏn Line
Kamho (감호)	Kangwŏn	Kŭmgangsan Ch'ŏngnyŏn Line
Kangalli (강안리)	North Hamgyŏng	Hambuk Line, Sŏngp'yŏng Line
Kang'an (강안)	North P'yŏngan	Kang'an Line
Kangdŏk (강덕)	North Hamgyŏng	Kangdŏk Line, Kŭndong Line
Kangdong (강동)	P'yŏngyang	P'yŏngdŏk Line
Kanggu (강구)	Ryanggang	Pukpu Line
Kangha (강하)	Ryanggang	Pukpu Line
Kanggye (강계)	Chagang	Kanggye Line, Manp'o Line
Kangryŏng (강령)	South Hwanghae	Pup'o Line
Kangsangri (강상리)	South Hamgyŏng	P'yŏngra Line
Kangsŏ (강서)	Namp'o	Posan Line, P'yŏngnam Line, Taean Line
Kangsŏn (강선)	Namp'o	Chamjilli Line, P'yŏngnam Line
Kangyang (강양)	North Hamgyŏng	Hambuk Line
Kanp'yŏng (간평)	North Hamgyŏng	Hambuk Line
Kansambong (간삼봉)	Ryanggang	Samjiyŏn Line
Karim (가림)	Ryanggang	Poch'ŏn Line, Samjiyŏn Line
Kiam (기암)	South Hamgyŏng	P'yŏngra Line
Kilju Ch'ŏngnyŏn (길주청년)	North Hamgyŏng	Paektusan Ch'ŏngnyŏn Line, P'yŏngra Line
Kimch'aek (김책)	North Hamgyŏng	P'yŏngra Line
Kindŭng (긴등)	North Hwanghae	P'yŏngbu Line
Kisan Ch'ŏngnyŏn (기산청년)	Kangwŏn	Ch'ŏngnyŏn Ich'ŏn Line
Kit'an (기탄)	North Hwanghae	Ch'ŏngnyŏn Ich'ŏn Line
Koam (고암)	Kangwŏn	Munch'ŏn Port Line
Kobi (고비)	North Hwanghae	Kobi Line
Kŏch'a (거차)	South P'yŏngan	P'yŏngra Line
Kogŏnwŏn (고건원)	North Hamgyŏng	Kogŏnwŏn Line
Kŏhŭng (거흥)	South P'yŏngan	P'yŏngra Line
Koin (고인)	Chagang	Manp'o Line
Kokha (곡하)	Chagang	Manp'o Line
Kokku (곡구)	South Hamgyŏng	P'yŏngra Line
Kŏmbullang (검불랑)	Kangwŏn	Kangwŏn Line
Kŏmsalli (검산리)	Ryanggang	Paektusan Ch'ŏngnyŏn Line
Komusan (고무산)	North Hamgyŏng	Hambuk Line, Musan Line
Kongbuk (공북)	Chagang	Kanggye Line
Kongin (공인)	Chagang	Manp'o Line
Kŏnha (건하)	Chagang	Manp'o Line
Kŏnja (건자)	South Hamgyŏng	P'yŏngra Line
Koryŏngjin (고령진)	North Hamgyŏng	Hambuk Line
Kosan (고산)	Kangwŏn	Kangwŏn Line
Kŏsan (거산)	South Hamgyŏng	P'yŏngra Line
Koto (고토)	South Hamgyŏng	Changjin Line
Koŭp (고읍)	North P'yŏngan	P'yŏngŭi Line
Kosŏng (고성)	Kangwŏn	Kŭmgangsan Ch'ŏngnyŏn Line
Kowŏn (고원)	North Hamgyŏng	Kangwŏn Line, P'yŏngra Line
Kubongsan (구봉산)	North P'yŏngan	Ch'ŏnghwaryŏk Line, Kubongsan Line
Kuhyŏng (구형)	South P'yŏngan	Ingp'o Line, P'yŏngdŏk Line
Kujang Ch'ŏngnyŏn 구장청년	North P'yŏngan	Ch'ŏngnyŏn P'arwŏn Line, Manp'o Line, P'yŏngdŏk Line, Ryong'am Line
Kujŏng (구정)	South P'yŏngan	Chaedong Line, P'yŏngdŏk Line
Kujung (구중)	Chagang	Pukpu Line
Kukkyŏng (국경)	North Hamgyŏng	Namyang Border Line
Kŭktong (극동)	North Hamgyŏng	P'yŏngra Line
Kulsong (굴송)	Ryanggang	Paengmu Line
Kŭmbawi (금바위)	North Hamgyŏng	P'yŏngra Line
Kŭmbonggang (금봉강)	Kangwŏn	Kŭmgangsan Ch'ŏngnyŏn Line
Kŭmch'ŏn (금천)	North Hwanghae	P'yŏngbu Line
Kŭmgangsan Ch'ŏngnyŏn (금강산청년)	Kangwŏn	Kŭmgangsan Ch'ŏngnyŏn Line
Kŭmgol (금골)	South Hamgyŏng	Kŭmgol Line
Kŭmok (금옥)	North Hwanghae	P'yŏngdŏk Line
Kŭmp'ae (금패)	North Hamgyŏng	Musan Line
Kŭmp'yŏng (금평)	South P'yŏngan	P'yŏngdŏk Line
Kŭmsaeng (금생)	North Hamgyŏng	Hambuk Line
Kŭmsan (금산)	South Hwanghae	Ŭnnyul Line
Kŭmsanp'o (금산포)	South Hwanghae	Ŭnnyul Line
Kŭmsong (금송)	North Hamgyŏng	P'yŏngra Line
Kŭmya (금야)	South Hamgyŏng	Kŭmya Line, P'yŏngra Line
Kŭndong (근동)	North Hamgyŏng	Kangdŏk Line
Kuo (구오)	Chagang	Unha Line
Kuryongpy'ŏng (구룡평)	Rasŏn	Hambuk Line
Kusŏng (구성)	North P'yŏngan	Ch'ŏngnyŏn P'arwŏn Line, P'yŏngbuk Line
Kuunbong (구운봉)	Chagang	Unbong Line
Kuŭp (구읍)	South P'yŏngan	Choyang Colliery Line
Kwail (과일)	South Hwanghae	Ŭnnyul Line
Kwaksan (곽산)	North P'yŏngan	P'yŏngŭi Line
Kwangch'ŏn (광천)	South Hamgyŏng	Kŭmgol Line
Kwanghae (관해)	North Hamgyŏng	P'yŏngra Line
Kwangmyŏng (광명)	Kangwŏn	Kangwŏn Line
Kwan'gok (관곡)	Rasŏn	Hambuk Line
Kwanha (관하)	South P'yŏngan	Kwanha Line
Kwi'in (귀인)	Chagang	Pukpu Line
Kwisŏng (귀성)	Namp'o	P'yŏngnam Line
Kyejŏng (계정)	North Hwanghae	P'yŏngbu Line
Kyŏngan (경안)	South Hamgyŏng	P'yŏngra Line
Kyŏnghŭng (경흥)	South Hamgyŏng	Sinhŭng Line
Kyŏngp'o (경포)	South Hamgyŏng	P'yŏngra Line
Kyŏngsŏng (경성)	North Hamgyŏng	P'yŏngra Line
Maebong (매봉)	South P'yŏngan	Maebong Line
Maengjungri (맹중리)	North P'yŏngan	Namhŭng Line, Pakch'ŏn Line, P'yŏngŭi Line
Majŏn (마전)	South Hamgyŏng	P'yŏngra Line
Manch'un (만춘)	North Hamgyŏng	P'yŏngra Line
Mandalli (만달리)	North Hwanghae	P'yŏngdŏk Line
Mandŏk (만덕)	South Hamgyŏng	Mandŏk Line
Mangilli (망일리)	South P'yŏngan	Ch'ŏnsŏng Colliery Line
Manp'o Ch'ŏngnyŏn (만포청년)	Chagang	Manp'o Line, Pukpu Line, Unha Line
Mapyŏng (마평)	North P'yŏngan	Map'yŏng Line
Mayŏng (마영)	Namp'o	Ryonggang Line
Midun (미둔)	South Hamgyŏng	P'yŏngra Line
Mint'ang (민탕)	Ryanggang	Pukpu Line
Mirim (미림)	P'yŏngyang	P'yŏngdŏk Line
Mohak (모학)	South P'yŏngan	Mohak Line
Motka (못가)	Ryanggang	Samjiyŏn Line
Much'ang (무창)	Ryanggang	Pukpu Line
Muhak (무학)	South Hamgyŏng	Kŭmgol Line
Mujindae (무진대)	South P'yŏngan	Taegŏn Line
Mukch'ŏn (묵천)	North Hwanghae	Hwanghae Ch'ŏngnyŏn Line
Muksi (묵시)	North P'yŏngan	Ch'ŏngnyŏn P'arwŏn Line
Mulgae (물개)	North Hwanghae	P'yŏngbu Line
Mulgol (물골)	Rasŏn	Hambuk Line
Mun'ak (문악)	Chagang	An'gol Line, Pukpu Line
Mun'am (문암)	South Hamgyŏng	P'yŏngra Line
Munbong (문봉)	South Hamgyŏng	P'yŏngra Line
Munch'ŏn (문천)	Kangwŏn	Kangwŏn Line
Mundŏk (문덕)	South P'yŏngan	P'yŏngŭi Line, Sŏhae Line
Mundŏng Ch'ŏngnyŏn (문동청년)	Kangwŏn	Ch'ŏngnyŏn Ich'ŏn Line
Munjŏng (문정)	South Hwanghae	Ongjin Line
Munmu (문무)	North Hwanghae	P'yŏngbu Line
Munp'il (문필)	South Hamgyŏng	P'yŏngra Line
Musan (무산)	North Hamgyŏng	Musan Line, Paengmu Line
Musan Ch'ŏlsan (무산철산)	North Hamgyŏng	Musan Line
Musan Kwangsan (Musan Mine) (무산광산)	North Hamgyŏng	Musan Mining Line
Musu (무수)	North Hamgyŏng	Musan Line
Myohyangsan (묘향산)	North P'yŏngan	Manp'o Line
Myŏngch'ŏn (명천)	North Hamgyŏng	Koch'am Colliery Line, P'yŏngra Line
Myŏngdang (명당)	North Hwanghae	Myŏngdang Line
Myŏnggo (명고)	Kangwŏn	Kŭmgangsan Ch'ŏngnyŏn Line
Myŏnghak (명학)	South P'yŏngan	Myŏnghak Line
Myŏngho (명호)	Rasŏn	P'yŏngra Line
Naedong (내동)	South P'yŏngan	P'yŏngra Line
Naejung (내중)	North P'yŏngan	P'yŏngŭi Line
Naep'o (내포)	North Hamgyŏng	P'yŏngra Line
Namch'on (남촌)	North Hamgyŏng	Paengmu Line
Namdŏk (남덕)	South P'yŏngan	P'yŏngdŏk Line
Namdŏkch'ŏn (South Tŏkch'ŏn) (남덕천)	South P'yŏngan	P'yŏngdŏk Line, Tŏngnam Line
Namdong (남동)	South P'yŏngan	Namdong Line, Sŏhae Line
Nam'ae (남애)	Kangwŏn	Kŭmgangsan Ch'ŏngnyŏn Line
Namgangdŏk (South Kangdŏk) (남강덕)	North Hamgyŏng	Kangdŏk Line, P'yŏngra Line
Namgye (남계)	Ryanggang	Paektusan Ch'ŏngnyŏn Line
Namhŭng (남흥)	North P'yŏngan	Namhŭng Line
Namjung (남중)	Ryanggang	Paektusan Ch'ŏngnyŏn Line
Nammun (남문)	Chagang	Kanggye Line
Namp'o (남포)	Namp'o	P'yŏngnam Line, Tojiri Line
Namp'ohang (Namp'o Port) (남포항)	Namp'o	Namp'o Port Line
Namsan (남산)	Kangwŏn	Kangwŏn Line
Namsan (남산)	North Hwanghae	Kobi Line
Namsinŭiju (South Sinŭiju) (남신의주)	North P'yŏngan	Paengma Line, P'yongŭi Line, Tŏkhyŏn Line
Namsŏk (남석)	North Hamgyŏng	Paektusan Ch'ŏngnyŏn Line
Namyang (남양)	North Hamgyŏng	Hambuk Line, Namyang Border Line
Nongch'on (농촌)	South Hamgyŏng	Hŏch'ŏn Line
Nongp'o (농포)	North Hamgyŏng	Hambuk Line
Nŭpp'yŏng (늪평)	Ryanggang	Pukpu Line
Nyŏngbyŏn (녕변)	North P'yŏngan	Ch'ŏngnyŏn P'arwŏn Line
Ŏbŏk (업억)	North Hamgyŏng	P'yŏngra Line
Obong (오봉)	North Hamgyŏng	Hoeam Line
Ŏdaejin (어대진)	North Hamgyŏng	P'yŏngra Line
Oedong (외동)	South P'yŏngan	Taegŏn Line
Ogubi (오구비)	Ryanggang	Pukpu Line
Ogye (오계)	Kangwŏn	Kŭmgangsan Ch'ŏngnyŏn Line
Ohyŏn (오현)	South Hwanghae	Paech'ŏn Line
O-il (1 May) (오일)	Chagang	Kanggye Line
Okch'ŏn (옥천)	South P'yŏngan	P'yŏngdŏk Line
Ŏmihyŏn (어미현)	North P'yŏngan	Ch'ŏngnyŏn P'arwŏn Line
Omongri (오몽리)	South Hamgyŏng	P'yŏngra Line, Tuŏn Line
Ongjin (옹진)	South Hwanghae	Ongjin Line
Ongp'yŏng (옥평)	Kangwŏn	Kangwŏn Line, Munch'ŏn Port Line
Onjŏng (온정)	South Hwanghae	Paech'ŏn Line
Onsup'yŏng (온수평)	North Hamgyŏng	P'yŏngra Line
Ŏp'a (어파)	South P'yŏngan	P'yŏngŭi Line
Ŏrang (어랑)	North Hamgyŏng	P'yŏngra Line
Ŏryong (어룡)	North P'yŏngan	Manp'o Line, Ryongmun Colliery Line
Ŏsa (어사)	North Hwanghae	Hwanghae Ch'ŏngnyŏn Line
Osich'ŏn (五是川)	Ryanggang	Osich'ŏn Line
Paech'ŏn (배천)	South Hwanghae	Paech'ŏn Line
Paeg'am Ch'ŏngnyŏn (백암청년)	Ryanggang	Paektusan Ch'ŏngnyŏn Line, Paengmu Line
Paeg'un (백운)	North P'yŏngan	P'yŏngbuk Line
Paegwŏn (백원)	South P'yŏngan	P'yŏngdŏk Line
Paehwa (배화)	Kangwŏn	Kangwŏn Line
Paekkŭmsan (백금산)	South Hamgyŏng	Kŭmgol Line
Paeksan Ch'ŏngnyŏn (백산청년)	Kangwŏn	Ch'ŏngnyŏn Ich'ŏn Line
Paeksŏk (백석)	South Hwanghae	Ŭnnyul Line
Paengma (백마)	North P'yŏngan	Paengma Line
Paesanjŏm (배산점)	P'yŏngyang	P'yŏngra Line
P'alhŭng (팔흥)	South Hamgyŏng	P'yŏngra Line
P'alyŏng Station	North P'yŏngan	P'yŏngbuk Line
Panghwa (방화)	South Hamgyŏng	P'yŏngra Line
Panghyŏn (방현)	North P'yŏngan	P'yŏngbuk Line
Pangjin (방진)	North Hamgyŏng	P'yŏngra Line
P'an'gyo (판교)	Kangwŏn	Ch'ŏngnyŏn Ich'ŏn Line
Panjuk (반죽)	North Hamgyŏng	Hambuk Line
P'anmak (판막)	North P'yŏngan	P'yŏngbuk Line
P'anmun (판문)	North Hwanghae	P'yŏngbu Line
P'arwŏn (팔원)	North P'yŏngan	Ch'ŏngnyŏn P'arwŏn Line, Pun'gang Line
P'ihyŏn (피현)	North P'yŏngan	Paengma Line
Pinallon (Vinylon) (비날론)	South Hamgyŏng	Pinallon Line, Sŏho Line
Poan (보안)	Ryanggang	Paektusan Ch'ŏngnyŏn Line
Pojang (부장)	South Hamgyŏng	Changjin Line
Pokkye (복계)	Kangwŏn	Kangwŏn Line
Pŏmp'o (범포)	South Hamgyŏng	P'yŏngra Line
Pongch'ang (봉창)	South P'yŏngan	Taegŏn Line
Pongch'ŏn (봉천)	South P'yŏngan	Manp'o Line, Pongch'ŏn Colliery Line
Pongch'ŏn T'an'gwang (Pongch'ŏn Colliery) (봉천탄광)	South P'yŏngan	Pongch'ŏn Colliery Line
Pongdong (봉동)	North Hwanghae	P'yŏngbu Line
Ponggang (봉강)	North Hamgyŏng	P'yŏngra Line
Ponghak (봉학)	South P'yŏngan	Ponghak Line, P'yŏngra Line
Pongmyŏng (봉명)	North P'yŏngan	P'yŏngbuk Line
Pongsan (봉산)	North Hwanghae	Pongsan Line, P'yŏngbu Line
P'op'yŏng Ch'ŏngnyŏn (포평청년)	Ryanggang	Pukpu Line
Posan (보산)	Namp'o	Posan Line
Pot'onggang (보통강)	P'yŏngyang	P'yŏngnam Line, P'yŏngyang Thermal Power Plant Line
Pudong (부동)	South Hamgyŏng	Mandŏk Line
Pugŏ (부거)	North Hamgyŏng	P'yŏngra Line
Puhŭng (부흥)	South P'yŏngan	Chiktong Colliery Line
Puji (부지)	Chagang	Manp'o Line
Pujŏllyŏng (부전령)	South Hamgyŏng	Sinhŭng Line
Pujŏn (부전)	South Hamgyŏng	Sinhŭng Line
Pujŏnhoban (부전호반)	South Hamgyŏng	Sinhŭng Line
Pukch'ang (북창)	South P'yŏngan	Kwanha Line, P'yŏngdŏk Line, Tŭkchang Line
Pukch'ŏng (북청)	South Hamgyong	Tŏksŏng Line
Pukchung (북중)	North P'yŏngan	Tasado Line
Pukkyesu (북계수)	Ryanggang	Paengmu Line
Puksinhyŏn (북신현)	North P'yŏngan	Manp'o Line, Unsan Line
Puksongri (북송리)	North P'yŏngan	Kaech'ŏn Line
Pumin (부민)	South Hamgyŏng	Sinhŭng Line
Pun'gang (분강)	North P'yŏngan	Pun'gang Line
P'ungch'ŏn (풍천)	South Hwanghae	Paech'ŏn Line
P'unggye (풍계)	North Hamgyŏng	Paektusan Ch'ŏngnyŏn Line
P'ung'in (풍인)	North Hamgyŏng	Hambuk Line
P'ungnam (풍남)	South Hamgyŏng	Kŭmya Line
P'ungnyŏn (풍년)	North P'yŏngan	P'yŏngbuk Line
Pung'ŏ (풍어)	South Hamgyŏng	P'yŏngra Line
P'ungri (풍리)	North Hamgyŏng	Hambuk Line
P'ungsan (풍산)	North Hamgyŏng	Hambuk Line
P'ungsang (풍상)	South Hamgyŏng	Sinhŭng Line
P'ungyang (풍양)	Ryanggang	Pukpu Line
Pup'o (부포)	South Hwanghae	Pup'o Line
Pup'ung (부풍)	North P'yŏngan	Amrokkang Line, P'yŏngbuk Line, Sup'ung Line
Pup'yŏng (부평)	South Hamgyŏng	P'yŏngra Line
Puraesan (부래산)	South Hamgyŏng	P'yŏngra Line
Puryŏng (부령)	North Hamgyŏng	Hambuk Line
Pusalli (부산리)	South P'yŏngan	Chiktong Colliery Line
Pusŏng (부성)	Chagang	Manp'o Line
P'yemusan (폐무산)	North Hamgyŏng	Musan Line
Pyŏksŏng (벽성)	South Hwanghae	Ongjin Line
P'yŏngch'ŏn (평천)	P'yŏngyang	P'yŏngyang Thermal Power Plant Line
P'yŏnggang (평강)	Kangwŏn	Kangwŏn Line
P'yŏngnam Onch'ŏn (평남온천)	Namp'o	Namdong Line, P'yŏngnam Line
P'yŏngnam Sŏho (평남서호)	South P'yŏngan	Sŏhae Line
P'yŏngnam Taean (평남대안)	Namp'o	Taean Line
Py'ŏngsan (평산)	North Hwanghae	Ch'ŏngnyŏn Ich'ŏn Line, Py'ŏngbu Line
P'yŏngsŏng (평성)	South P'yŏngan	P'yŏngra Line
P'yŏngyang (평양)	P'yŏngyang	P'yŏngbu Line, P'yŏngdŏk Line, P'yŏngnam Line, P'yŏngra Line, P'yŏngŭi Line
P'yŏngyang Choch'ajang (P'yŏngyang Marshalling Yard) (평양조차장)	P'yŏngyang	P'yŏngyang Thermal Power Plant Line
Ragwŏn (락원)	South Hamgyŏng	P'yŏngra Line
Ragwŏn (락원)	North P'yŏngan	P'yŏngŭi Line
Ragyŏn (락연)	South Hwanghae	Changyŏn Line
Rahŭng (라흥)	South Hamgyŏng	P'yŏngra Line, Riwŏn Line
Rajin (라진)	Rasŏn	Hambuk Line, P'yŏngra Line, Rajin Port Line
Rajinhang (Rajin Port) (라진항)	Rasŏn	Rajin Port Line
Rajŏk (라적)	North Hamgyŏng	Paengmu Line
Rajuk (라죽)	Ryanggang	Pukpu Line
Rakch'ŏn (락천)	Kangwŏn	Kangwŏn Line
Raksan (락산)	North Hamgyŏng	P'yŏngra Line
Ramjŏn (람전)	South P'yŏngan	Manp'o Line
Ranam (라남)	North Hamgyŏng	P'yŏngra Line
Rangrang (락랑)	P'yŏngyang	P'yŏngbu Line
Rangrim (랑림)	Chagang	Kanggye Line
Rihyŏn (리현)	P'yŏngyang	Myŏngdang Line
Riman (리만)	Chagang	Manp'o Line
Ri'mok (리목)	Kangwŏn	Kangwŏn Line
Rimt'o (림토)	Chagang	Pukpu Line
Rip'a (리파)	South Hamgyŏng	Kŭmgol Line
Ripsŏk T'an'gwang (Ripsŏk Colliery) (립석탄광)	South P'yŏngan	Sŏhae Line
Ripsŏngri (립석리)	North Hwanghae	Kobi Line, P'yŏngdŏk Line
Rip'yŏng (리평)	Chagang	Pukpu Line
Riwŏn (리원)	South Hamgyŏng	P'yŏngra Line
Riwŏn Ch'ŏlsan (리원철산)	South Hamgyŏng	Riwŏn Line
Rodong (로동)	North Hamgyŏng	Ilt'an Line, P'yŏngra Line
Roha (로하)	North P'yŏngan	P'yŏngŭi Line
Rosang (로상)	Namp'o	P'yŏngnam Line
Rot'an (로탄)	Ryanggang	Pukpu Line
Ryangch'aek (량책)	North P'yŏngan	Paengma Line
Ryangga (량가)	South Hamgyong	Tŏksŏng Line
Ryanggang Sinsang (량강신상)	Ryanggang	Pukpu Line
Ryŏho (려호)	South Hamgyŏng	P'yŏngra Line
Ryŏhyŏn (려현)	North Hwanghae	P'yŏngbu Line
Ryŏkp'o (력포)	P'yŏngyang	P'yŏngbu Line, Rangrang Line
Ryŏmsŏng (렴성)	Kangwŏn	Kŭmgangsan Ch'ŏngnyŏn Line
Ryong'ak (룡악)	South P'yŏngan	Taegŏn Line
Ryong'am (룡암)	North P'yŏngan	Ryong'am Line
Ryongamp'o (룡암포)	North P'yŏngan	Tasado Line
Ryongban (룡반)	North Hamgyŏng	P'yŏngra Line
Ryongbuk (룡북)	North Hamgyŏng	Kogŏnwŏn Line
Ryongch'ŏn (룡천)	North P'yŏngan	P'yŏngŭi Line, Tasado Line
Ryongch'ul (룡출)	Chagang	Pukpu Line
Ryŏngdae (령대)	South P'yŏngan	Ryŏngdae Line
Ryŏngdae (룡대)	South Hamgyŏng	P'yŏngra Line
Ryongdam (룡담)	Kangwŏn	Ch'ŏnnae Line, Kangwŏn Line
Ryongdangri (룡당리)	North Hamgyŏng	Hambuk Line
Ryongdong (룡동)	North Hamgyŏng	P'yŏngra Line
Ryonggang (룡강)	Namp'o	P'yŏngnam Line, Ryonggang Line
Ryonggyeri (룡계리)	North P'yŏngan	Paengma Line
Ryŏngha (령하)	Ryanggang	Paektusan Ch'ŏngnyŏn Line
Ryongho (룡호)	Namp'o	Ryonggang Line
Ryonghyŏn (룡현)	North Hamgyŏng	P'yŏngra Line, Taehyang Line
Ryongjiwŏn (룡지원)	Kangwŏn	Kangwŏn Line
Ryongjŏng (룡정)	South Hwanghae	Sŏhaeri Line
Ryongju (룡주)	North P'yŏngan	P'yŏngŭi Line
Ryongmun T'an'gwang (Ryongmun Colliery) (룡문탄광)	North P'yŏngan	Ryongmun Colliery Line
Ryŏngnam (령남)	Ryanggang	Paektusan Ch'ŏngnyŏn Line
Ryongrim (룡림)	South P'yŏngan	Ch'ŏngnam Line
Ryongsan (룡산)	South P'yŏngan	Tŭkchang Line
Ryongsilli (룡신리)	North Hamgyŏng	Kogŏnwŏn Line
Ryongsŏng (룡성)	South Hamgyŏng	Pinallon Line, Sŏho Line
Ryongsŏng (룡성)	P'yŏngyang	Ryongsŏng Line
Ryongsu (룡수)	South Hamgyŏng	Changjin Line
Ryong'un (룡운)	South Hamgyŏng	P'yŏngra Line
Ryŏngwŏl (령월)	Namp'o	Ryonggang Line
Ryongwŏlli (룡원리)	South P'yŏngan	Manp'o Line
Ryongyŏn (룡연)	South Hwanghae	Pup'o Line
Ryŏnhŭng (련흥)	South Hamgyŏng	Ch'anghŭng Line, P'yŏngra Line
Ryŏnjin (련진)	North Hamgyŏng	P'yŏngra Line
Ryuktaedong (륙대동)	South Hwanghae	Pup'o Line
Sado (사도)	Ryanggang	Paektusan Ch'ŏngnyŏn Line
Saebyŏl (새졀)	North Hamgyŏng	Hambuk Line
Saedong (새동)	P'yŏngyang	Ryongsŏng Line
Saenggiryŏng (생기령)	North Hamgyŏng	P'yŏngra Line
Saengjang (생장)	Ryanggang	Paektusan Ch'ŏngnyŏn Line
Sagu (사구)	North Hamgyŏng	P'yŏngra Line
Sahoe (사회)	Rasŏn	Hambuk Line
Sahyang (사향)	Chagang	Pukpu Line
Sambang (삼방)	Kangwŏn	Kangwŏn Line
Sambong (삼봉)	North Hamgyŏng	Hambuk Line
Samch'ŏn (삼천)	South Hwanghae	Ŭnnyul Line
Samch'ŏnp'o (삼천포)	South P'yŏngan	Ch'ŏngnam Line, Sŏhae Line
Samdŏk (삼덕)	South P'yŏngan	P'yŏngdŏk Line
Samdŭng (삼등)	P'yŏngyang	P'yŏngdŏk Line, Samdŭng Colliery Line
Samgi (삼기)	South Hamgyong	Tŏksŏng Line
Samgŏ (삼거)	South Hamgyŏng	Changjin Line
Samhae (삼해)	North Hamgyŏng	P'yŏngra Line
Samho (삼호)	South Hamgyŏng	P'yŏngra Line
Samhyang (삼향)	North Hamgyŏng	P'yŏngra Line
Samilp'o (삼일포)	Kangwŏn	Kŭmgangsan Ch'ŏngnyŏn Line
Samjiyŏn (삼지연)	Ryanggang	Samjiyŏn Line
Samsandong (삼산동)	North Hwanghae	Kobi Line
Samso (삼소)	South P'yŏngan	Taegŏn Line
Samsu Ch'ŏngnyŏn (삼수청년)	Ryanggang	Pukpu Line
Samyu (삼유)	North Hamgyŏng	Paengmu Line
Sangdae (상대)	Ryanggang	Pukpu Line
Sangdonae (Upper Tonae) (상도내)	Ryanggang	Paengmu Line
Sanghwangt'o (Upper Hwangt'o) (상황토)	Ryanggang	Paengmu Line
Sangil (상일)	South Hamgyong	Tŏksŏng Line
Sangri (상리)	South Hamgyong	Tŏksŏng Line
Sangnong (상농)	South Hamgyŏng	Hŏch'ŏn Line
Sangp'unggang (상풍강)	Chagang	Pukpu Line, Unbong Line
Sangp'yŏng (상평)	South Hamgyŏng	Changjin Line
Sangryongban (Upper Ryongban) (상룡반)	North Hamgyŏng	P'yŏngra Line
Sangsinwŏn (Upper Sinwŏn) (상신원)	Chagang	Kanggye Line
Sangsu (상수)	South Hamgyŏng	Sŏho Line
Sangt'ong (상통)	South Hamgyŏng	Changjin Line
Sangŭm Ch'ŏngnyŏn (상음청년)	Kangwŏn	Kŭmgangsan Ch'ŏngnyŏn Line
Sansu (산수)	South Hwanghae	Ŭnnyul Line
Sanyangdae (산양대)	Ryanggang	Paengmu Line
Sao (사오)	North P'yŏngan	Ch'ŏngnyŏn P'arwŏn Line
Sap'o (사포)	South Hamgyŏng	Sŏho Line
Sariwŏn Ch'ŏngnyŏn (사리원청년)	North Hwanghae	Hwanghae Ch'ŏngnyŏn Line, P'yŏngbu Line
Sasu (사수)	South Hamgyŏng	Changjin Line
Sech'ŏn (세천)	North Hamgyŏng	Sech'ŏn Line
Segil (세길)	Kangwŏn	Kangwŏn Line, Songdowŏn Line
Sep'o Ch'ŏngnyŏn (세포청년)	Kangwŏn	Ch'ŏngnyŏn Ich'ŏn Line, Kangwŏn Line
Sep'ori (세포리)	South Hamgyŏng	P'yŏngra Line
Sijŏng (시정)	P'yŏngyang	P'yŏngra Line, P'yŏngŭi Line, Sijŏng Line
Sijung (시중)	Chagang	Manp'o Line
Sijungho (시중호)	Kangwŏn	Kŭmgangsan Ch'ŏngnyŏn Line
Sillyong (신룡)	North P'yŏngan	Ch'ŏngnyŏn P'arwŏn Line
Sillyŏngri (신령리)	Namp'o	P'yŏngnam Line, Sŏhae Kammun Line
Sillyŏnp'o (신련포)	South P'yŏngan	P'yŏngra Line, Taegŏn Line
Simp'ori (심포리)	Ryanggang	Paektusan Ch'ŏngnyŏn Line
Simridong (십리동)	Chagang	Pukpu Line
Simrip'yŏng (십리평)	Chagang	Kanggye Line
Sinanju Ch'ŏngnyŏn (신안주청년)	North P'yŏngan	Kaech'ŏn Line, P'yŏngŭi Line
Sinasan (신아산)	North Hamgyŏng	Hambuk Line
Sinbukch'ŏng (신북청)	South Hamgyŏng	P'yŏngra Line, Tŏksŏng Line
Sinch'am (신참)	North Hamgyŏng	Musan Line
Sinch'ang (신창)	South P'yŏngan	Ch'ŏnsŏng Colliery Line, P'yŏngra Line
Sinch'ŏn (신천)	South Hwanghae	Ŭnnyul Line
Sinch'ŏn Onch'ŏn (신천온천)	South Hwanghae	Ŭnnyul Line
Sinch'ŏngri (신청리)	Chagang	Manp'o Line
Sindae (신대)	South Hwanghae	Ŭnnyul Line
Sindanch'ŏn (신단천)	South Hamgyŏng	P'yŏngra Line
Sindŏk (신덕)	South Hamgyŏng	Kŭmgol Line
Sin'gangryŏng (신강령)	South Hwanghae	Ongjin Line, Pup'o Line
Sin'gŏn (신건)	North Hamgyŏng	Hambuk Line, Kogŏnwŏn Line
Sin'gye (신계)	North Hwanghae	Ch'ŏngnyŏn Ich'ŏn Line
Sinhakp'o (신학포)	North Hamgyŏng	Hambuk Line, Sech'ŏn Line
Sinhŭng (신흥)	South Hamgyŏng	Sinhŭng Line
Sinhŭngdong (신흥동)	North P'yŏngan	Manp'o Line
Sinjŏn (신전)	North Hamgyŏng	Hambuk Line
Sinjŏngri (신정리)	North P'yŏngan	Tasado Line
Sinjumak (신주막)	South Hwanghae	Hwanghae Ch'ŏngnyŏn Line
Sinjung (신중)	South Hamgyŏng	P'yŏngra Line
Sinjŭngsan (신증산)	South Hamgyŏng	Kŭmgol Line
Sinmak (신막)	North Hwanghae	P'yŏngbu Line
Sinmyŏngch'ŏn (신명천)	North Hamgyŏng	Koch'am Colliery Line
Sinnamp'o (신남포)	Namp'o	Namp'o Port Line, P'yŏngnam Line
Sinon (신온)	North P'yŏngan	P'yŏngbuk Line, Taegwalli Line
Sinp'a Ch'ŏngnyŏn (신파청년)	Ryanggang	Pukpu Line
Sinp'o (신포)	South Hamgyŏng	P'yŏngra Line
Sinp'yŏng (신평)	South Hamgyŏng	Kŭmgol Line
Sinsaeng (신생)	Kangwŏn	Ch'ŏngnyŏn Ich'ŏn Line
Sinsang (신상)	South Hamgyŏng	P'yŏngra Line
Sinsŏng (신성)	South P'yŏngan	Sinsŏng Line
Sinsŏngch'ŏn (신성천)	South P'yŏngan	P'yŏngdŏk Line, P'yŏngra Line
Sinŭiju Ch'ŏngnyŏn (신의주청년)	North P'yŏngan	Kang'an Line, P'yŏngŭi Line
Sinwŏn (신원)	South Hwanghae	Hwanghae Ch'ŏngnyŏn Line
Sinyang (신양)	South P'yŏngan	P'yŏngra Line
Sŏbongsan (West Pongsan) (서봉산)	North Hwanghae	Pongsan Line
Sŏbu (서부)	North P'yŏngan	P'yŏngbuk Line
Sŏch'ang (서창)	South P'yŏngan	Sŏch'ang Line
Sodo (소도)	North Hamgyŏng	Paengmu Line
Sŏdŏkch'ŏn (West Tŏkch'ŏn) (서덕천)	South P'yŏngan	Sinsŏng Line, Sŏch'ang Line
Sŏdu (서두)	Ryanggang	Paengmu Line
Sŏg'am (석암)	P'yŏngyang	P'yŏngŭi Line
Sŏgwangryang (West Kwangryang) (서광량)	Namp'o	P'yŏngnam Line
Sŏha (서하)	Kangwŏn	Ch'ŏngnyŏn Ich'ŏn Line
Sŏhae Kammun (서해갑문)	Namp'o	Sŏhae Kammun Line
Sŏhaeju (West Haeju) (서해주)	South Hwanghae	Ongjin Line
Sŏhaeri (서해리)	South Hwanghae	Sŏhaeri Line
Sŏhamhŭng (West Hamhŭng) (서함흥)	South Hamgyŏng	Sŏho Line
Sŏho (서호)	South Hamgyŏng	P'yŏngra Line, Sŏho Line
Sŏhŭng (서흥)	North Hwanghae	P'yŏngbu Line
Sŏkkan (석간)	South P'yŏngan	Choyang Colliery Line
Sŏkha (석하)	North P'yŏngan	Paengma Line
Sokhu (속후)	South Hamgyŏng	P'yŏngra Line
Sŏkpong (석봉)	North Hamgyŏng	Hambuk Line
Sŏksan (석산)	South P'yŏngan	Tŭkchang Line
Sŏktang Onch'ŏn (석탕온천)	South P'yŏngan	P'yŏngra Line
Solgol (솔골)	South P'yŏngan	Solgol Colliery Line
Sŏnbong (선봉)	Rasŏn	Hambuk Line, Sŭngri Line
Sŏnch'ŏn (선천)	North P'yŏngan	P'yŏngŭi Line
Sŏngbŏp (성법)	South P'yŏngan	Sŏhae Line
Sŏngch'ŏn (성천)	South P'yŏngan	P'yŏngdŏk Line
Sŏngch'ŏngang (성천강)	South Hamgyŏng	Pinallon Line, Sŏho Line
Sŏngdan (송단)	South Hamgyŏng	P'yŏngra Line
Songdang (송당)	South Hamgyŏng	Changjin Line
Songdo (송도)	South P'yŏngan	Kubongsan Line, Namhŭng Line
Sŏngdŏk (성덕)	North Hamgyŏng	Paektusan Ch'ŏngnyŏn Line
Songdowŏn (송도원)	Kangwŏn	Songdowŏn Line
Songga (송가)	P'yŏngyang	P'yŏngdŏk Line, Tŏksan Line
Sŏnggan (성간)	Chagang	Manp'o Line
Songgwan (송관)	Namp'o	Sŏhae Kammun Line
Songha (송하)	South Hamgyŏng	Sinhŭng Line
Songhak (송학)	North Hamgyŏng	Ch'undu Line, Hambuk Line
Sŏnghu (성후)	North Hamgyŏng	Paektusan Ch'ŏngnyŏn Line
Songhŭng (송흥)	South Hamgyŏng	Sinhŭng Line
Songhwa (송화)	South Hwanghae	Ŭnnyul Line
Songhwa Onch'ŏn (송화온천)	South Hwanghae	Changyŏn Line
Songjŏn (송전)	Ryanggang	Pukpu Line
Songjŏng (송정)	Kangwŏn	Ch'ŏngnyŏn Ich'ŏn Line
Songjung (송중)	South Hamgyong	Tŏksŏng Line
Sŏngnae (성내)	South Hamgyŏng	P'yŏngra Line
Sŏngnam Ch'ŏngnyŏn (송남청년)	South P'yŏngan	P'yŏngdŏk Line, Solgol Colliery Line
Songp'yŏng (송평)	North Hamgyŏng	P'yŏngra Line
Sŏngp'yŏng (성평)	North Hamgyŏng	Sŏngp'yŏng Line
Songrim Ch'ŏngnyŏn (송림청년)	North Hwanghae	Songrim Line
Songrim Hwamul (Songrim Freight) (송림화물)	North Hwanghae	Songrim Line
Sŏngrŭm (석름)	P'yŏngyang	P'yŏngdŏk Line
Songsam (송삼)	Chagang	Pukpu Line
Songsan (송산)	North Hwanghae	Hwanghae Ch'ŏngnyŏn Line
Sŏngsan (성산)	Kangwŏn	Kangwŏn Line
Songsang (송상)	North Hamgyŏng	P'yŏngra Line
Songsin (송신)	P'yŏngyang	P'yŏngdŏk Line
Songudong (손구동)	South P'yŏngan	Ponghak Line
Sonha (손하)	North Hwanghae	P'yŏngbu Line
Sŏp'o (서포)	P'yŏngyang	P'yŏngra Line, P'yŏngŭi Line, Ryongsŏng Line
Sŏp'ungsan (West P'ungsan) (서풍산)	North Hamgyŏng	Musan Line
Sŏp'yŏngyang (West P'yŏngyang) (서평양)	P'yŏngyang	P'yŏngra Line, P'yŏngŭi Line
Sŏsang (서상)	North Hamgyŏng	Musan Line
Sŏsi (서시)	South P'yŏngan	Ch'ŏngnam Line, Sŏhae Line
Ssangam (쌍암)	South Hamgyŏng	P'yŏngra Line
Ssangbangdong (쌍방동)	Chagang	Manp'o Line
Ssangbu (쌍부)	Chagang	Manp'o Line
Ssangryong (쌍룡)	North Hamgyŏng	P'yŏngra Line
Such'on (수촌)	South Hamgyŏng	Kŭmgol Line
Sudŏk (수덕)	South P'yŏngan	P'yŏngra Line
Sudong (수동)	North Hamgyŏng	Kowŏn Colliery Line
Sugup'o (수구포)	North Hamgyŏng	Hambuk Line
Sugyo (수교)	South Hwanghae	Changyŏn Line, Ŭnnyul Line
Sujin (수진)	North P'yŏngan	Tŏkhyŏn Line
Sukch'ŏn (숙천)	South P'yŏngan	P'yŏngŭi Line
Sunam (수남)	North Hamgyŏng	P'yŏngra Line
Sunan (순안)	P'yŏngyang	P'yŏngŭi Line
Sunch'ŏn (순천)	South P'yŏngan	Manp'o Line, P'yŏngra Line
Sŭngam (승암)	North Hamgyŏng	P'yŏngra Line
Sŭngbang (승방)	Chagang	Kanggye Line
Sŭnghori (승호리)	North Hwanghae	P'yŏngdŏk Line
Sŭngri (승리)	Rasŏn	Sŭngri Line
Sŭngwŏn (승원)	North Hamgyŏng	P'yŏngra Line
Sup'ung (수풍)	North P'yŏngan	Sup'ung Line
Susŏng (수성)	North Hamgyŏng	Hambuk Line, Kangdŏk Line
Suŭi (수의)	South Hamgyŏng	Hŏch'ŏn Line
Suyang (수양)	South P'yŏngan	P'yŏngra Line
Taean Hwamul (Taean Freight) (대안화물)	Namp'o	Taean Line
T'aebaeksansŏng (태백산성)	North Hwanghae	P'yŏngbu Line
T'aech'ŏn (태천)	North P'yŏngan	Ch'ŏngnyŏn P'arwŏn Line
Taedŏk (대덕)	North Hamgyŏng	Hambuk Line
Taedonggang (대동강)	P'yŏngyang	P'yŏngbu Line, P'yŏngdok Line
Taegak (대각)	South P'yŏngan	Taegak Line
Taegŏn (대건)	South P'yŏngan	Chiktong Colliery Line, Mohak Line, Taegŏn Line, Ŭnsan Line
Taegwalli (대관리)	North P'yŏngan	Taegwalli Line
Taegyo (대교)	South P'yŏngan	P'yŏngŭi Line
Taehŭng (대흥)	South Hamgyŏng	Kŭmgol Line
Taehyang (대향)	North Hamgyŏng	Taehyang Line
T'aehyang (태향)	South P'yŏngan	Sŏhae Line
Taeoch'ŏn (대오천)	Ryanggang	Osich'ŏn Line, Paektusan Ch'ŏngnyŏn Line
Taep'yŏng (대평)	P'yŏngyang	P'yŏngnam Line
Taeryŏnggang (대령강)	North P'yŏngan	P'yŏngbuk Line
Taesin (대신)	South Hamgyŏng	Kŭmgol Line
Taet'aek (대택)	Ryanggang	Paengmu Line
Taeŭng (대응)	Ryanggang	Pukpu Line
Taewŏn (대원)	P'yŏngyang	Myŏngdang Line
Tanch'ŏn Ch'ŏngnyŏn (단천청년)	South Hamgyŏng	Hŏch'ŏn Line, P'yŏngra Line
Taptong (답동)	South Hamgyŏng	Kŭmgol Line
Tasado (다사도)	North P'yŏngan	Tasado Line
Tasadohang (Tasado Port) (다사도항)	North P'yŏngan	Tasado Line
Toan (도안)	South Hamgyŏng	Sinhŭng Line
Tojiri (도지리)	Namp'o	Tojiri Line
Tŏkch'ŏn (덕천)	South P'yŏngan	P'yŏngdŏk Line, Sŏch'ang Line
Tŏkhyŏn (덕현)	North P'yŏngan	Tŏkhyŏn Line
Tŏksa (덕사)	North Hamgyŏng	Kowŏn Colliery Line
Tŏksan (덕산)	P'yŏngyang	Tŏksan Line
Tŏksŏng (덕성)	South Hamgyong	Tŏksŏng Line
Tŏktong (덕동)	Namp'o	P'yŏngnam Line
Tonae (도내)	Ryanggang	Paengmu Line
Tong'am (동암)	South Hamgyŏng	Kŭmgol Line
Tongbungri (동북리)	P'yŏngyang	P'yŏngra Line, Ryongsŏng Line
Tongch'angri (동창리)	North P'yŏngan	Ch'ŏlsan Line
T'ongch'ŏn (통천)	Kangwŏn	Kŭmgangsan Ch'ŏngnyŏn Line
Tongdae (동대)	South Hamgyŏng	Hŏch'ŏn Line
Tongdŏk (동덕)	South Hamgyŏng	Kŭmgol Line
Tonggari (동가리)	Kangwŏn	Kangwŏn Line
Tonggwangryang (East Kwangryang) (동광량)	Namp'o	P'yŏngnam Line
Tonghae (동해)	Kangwŏn	Kŭmgangsan Ch'ŏngnyŏn Line
Tonghŭng (동흥)	South Hamgyŏng	Sinhŭng Line
Tongjŏngho (동정호)	Kangwŏn	Kŭmgangsan Ch'ŏngnyŏn Line
Tŏngnam (덕남)	South P'yŏngan	Tŏngnam Line
Tongnamhŭng (East Namhŭng) (동남흥)	North P'yŏngan	Kubongsan Line
Tongp'o (동포)	North Hamgyŏng	Tongp'o Line
Tongp'yŏngyang (East P'yŏngyang) (동평양)	P'yŏngyang	P'yŏngdŏk Line
Tongrim (동림)	North P'yŏngan	Ch'ŏlsan Line, P'yŏngŭi Line, Tongrim Industrial Line
Tongsariwŏn (East Sariwŏn) (동사리원)	North Hwanghae	P'yŏngbu Line
Tongsin (동신)	Chagang	Manp'o Line
Tongsŏnbong (West Sŏnbong) (동선봉)	Rasŏn	Hambuk Line
Tongyang (동양)	South Hamgyŏng	Changjin Line
Sinjŭngsan (돈산)	South Hamgyŏng	Kŭmgol Line
Top'yŏng (도평)	South Hamgyong	Tŏksŏng Line
T'oryŏng (토령)	South Hamgyŏng	P'yŏngra Line
Tuam (두암)	North Hamgyŏng	Paengmu Line
Tuillyŏng (두일령)	South P'yŏngan	P'yŏngdŏk Line
Tuji (두지)	Ryanggang	Pukpu Line
Tŭkchang (득장)	South P'yŏngan	Myŏnghak Line, Tŭkchang Line
Tumangang (두만강)	Rasŏn	Hongŭi Line
Tunjŏn (둔전)	North Hamgyŏng	Kowŏn Colliery Line, P'yŏngra Line
Tuŏn (두언)	South Hamgyŏng	Tuŏn Line
Tup'o (두포)	Kangwŏn	Kŭmgangsan Ch'ŏngnyŏn Line
Ŭiju (의주)	North P'yŏngan	Tŏkhyŏn Line
Un'am (운암)	North P'yŏngan	P'yŏngŭi Line
Ŭnbit (은빛)	South Hwanghae	Paech'ŏn Line
Unbong (운봉)	Chagang	Pukpu Line
Ŭndŏk (은덕)	North Hamgyŏng	Hoeam Line
Un'gok (운곡)	South Hamgyŏng	P'yŏngra Line
Ungsang (웅상)	Rasŏn	Hambuk Line
Unha (운하)	Chagang	Unha Line
Unhŭng (운흥)	Ryanggang	Paektusan Ch'ŏngnyŏn Line
Unhŭngri (운흥리)	North P'yŏngan	Kaech'ŏn Line
Unjŏn (운전)	North P'yŏngan	P'yŏngŭi Line
Unjung (운중)	South Hamgyŏng	Pinallon Line, Sŏho Line
Ŭnnyul (은률)	South Hwanghae	Ŭnnyul Line
Ŭnp'a (은파)	North Hwanghae	Hwanghae Ch'ŏngnyŏn Line, Ŭnnyul Line
Unp'o (운포)	South Hamgyŏng	P'yŏngra Line
Ŭnsan (은산)	South P'yŏngan	Changsŏn'gang Line, P'yŏngra Line, Ŭnsan Line
Unsong (운송)	Chagang	Manp'o Line
Unsŏng (운성)	North Hamgyŏng	Hambuk Line
Wangjang (왕장)	South Hamgyŏng	P'yŏngra Line
Wangsin (왕신)	South Hwanghae	Chŏngdo Line, Ongjin Line
Wiyŏn Ch'ŏngnyŏn (위연청년)	Ryanggang	Paektusan Ch'ŏngnyŏn Line, Samjiyŏn Line
Wŏlbong (월봉)	South Hwanghae	Ŭnnyul Line
Wŏlli (원리)	South P'yŏngan	Manp'o Line
Wŏlt'an (월탄)	Ryanggang	Pukpu Line
Wŏnch'ang (원창)	South P'yŏngan	P'yŏngdŏk Line, Ryŏngdae Line
Wŏnhŭng (원흥)	South P'yŏngan	Ch'ŏngnam Line
Wŏnp'yŏng (원평)	North Hamgyŏng	P'yŏngra Line
Wŏnsan (원산)	Kangwŏn	Kangwŏn Line, Songdowŏn Line
Wŏnsan Hwamul (Wonsan Freight) (원산화물)	Kangwŏn	Kangwŏn Line
Wŏnsanhang (Wŏnsan Port) (원산항)	Kangwŏn	Wŏnsan Port Line
Yaksu Station	Kangwŏn	Ch'ŏngnyŏn Ich'ŏn Line
Yangch'on (양촌)	South P'yŏngan	Tŭkchang Line
Yangdŏk (양덕)	South P'yŏngan	P'yŏngra Line
Yangdong (양동)	South Hwanghae	Ŭnnyul Line
Yanggok (양곡)	Ryanggang	Paektusan Ch'ŏngnyŏn Line
Yanghwa (양화)	South Hamgyŏng	P'yŏngra Line
Yangji (양지)	South Hamgyŏng	P'yŏngra Line
Yangmak (량막)	Namp'o	Husan Line
Yodŏk (요덕)	South Hamgyŏng	P'yŏngra Line
Yŏhaejin (여해진)	South Hamgyŏng	Kŭmgol Line, P'yŏngra Line, Tuŏn Line
Yŏmbun (염분)	South Hamgyŏng	P'yŏngra Line
Yŏmju (염주)	North P'yŏngan	Paengma Line, P'yŏngŭi Line
Yŏmt'an (염탄)	South Hwanghae	Hwanghae Ch'ŏngnyŏn Line
Yŏn'am (연암)	Ryanggang	Paengmu Line
Yŏn'an (연안)	South Hwanghae	Paech'ŏn Line
Yŏnggwang (영광)	South Hamgyŏng	Changjin Line, Sinhŭng Line
Yŏnjung (녕중)	North P'yŏngan	Ch'ŏngnyŏn P'arwŏn Line, Map'yŏng Line
Yŏnmŏk (연목)	Chagang	Manp'o Line
Yŏnp'o (연포)	Chagang	Pukpu Line
Yŏnp'ung (연풍)	North P'yŏngan	Kaech'ŏn Line
Yŏnp'yŏng (연평)	Ryanggang	Paengmu Line
Yŏnsa (연사)	North Hamgyŏng	Paengmu Line
Yŏnsang (연상)	North Hamgyŏng	Paengmu Line
Yŏnsu (연수)	North Hamgyŏng	Paengmu Line
Yugok (유곡)	Ryanggang	Paengmu Line
Yusŏn (유선)	North Hamgyŏng	Hoeryŏng Colliery Line
