= Riwon Line =

Railway in North Korea

Riwŏn Line

Overview
- Native name: 리원선 (利原線)
- Status: Operational
- Owner: Chosen Government Railway (1929–1945); Korean State Railway (since 1945)
- Locale: South Hamgyŏng
- Termini: Riwŏn Ch'ŏlsan; Ch'aho
- Stations: 4

Service
- Type: Heavy rail, Passenger & freight rail Regional rail

History
- Opened: 20 September 1929

Technical
- Line length: 11.2 km (7.0 mi)
- Number of tracks: Single track
- Track gauge: 1,435 mm (4 ft 8 1/2 in) standard gauge
- Electrification: 3000 V DC Catenary; 3.3 km (2.1 mi) Rahŭng−Chŭngsan

- Riwon Line
- Hangul: 리원선
- Hanja: 利原線
- RR: Riwonseon
- MR: Riwŏnsŏn

The Riwŏn Line is a partially electrified standard-gauge secondary line of the Korean State Railway in South Hamgyŏng Province, North Korea, running from Riwŏn Ch'ŏlsan to Ch'aho, via the Rahŭng−Chŭngsan section of the P'yŏngra Line.

== History ==
On 20 September 1929, the Chosen Government Railway (Sentetsu) opened three new lines: the Pukch'ŏng Line, the Ch'ŏlsan Line from Rahŭng on the Hamgyŏng Line to Riwŏn Ch'ŏlsan (not to be confused with the present-day Ch'ŏlsan Line that connects to the P'yŏngŭi Line), and the Ch'aho Line from Chŭngsan on the Hamgyŏng Line to Ch'aho.

After the Korean State railway merged the Hamgyŏng Line, the Ch'ŏngra Line, and the northern section of the former Kyŏngwŏn Line to create the P'yŏngra Line, it combined the Ch'aho and Ch'ŏlsan lines to create the current Riwŏn Line, with the newly formed line sharing the Rahŭng−Chŭngsan section with the P'yŏngra Line.

== Route ==
A yellow background in the "Distance" box indicates that section of the line is not electrified.

Distance (km)		Station Name		Former Name		
Total	S2S	Transcribed	Chosŏn'gŭl (Hanja)	Transcribed	Chosŏn'gŭl (Hanja)	Connections
0.0	0.0	Riwŏn Ch'ŏlsan	리원철산 (利原鐵山)	Iwŏn Ch'ŏlsan	이원철산 (利原鐵山)	
3.0	3.0	Rahŭng	라흥 (羅興)	Nahŭng	나흥 (羅興)	P'yŏngra Line
6.3	3.3	Chŭngsan	증산 (曾山)			P'yŏngra Line
11.2	4.9	Ch'aho	차호 (遮湖)			
