= Kyongwon County =

Kyongwon County 경원군
- County

Korean transcription(s)
  - Hanja: 慶源郡
  - McCune–Reischauer: Kyŏngwŏn-gun
  - Revised Romanization: Gyeongwon-gun
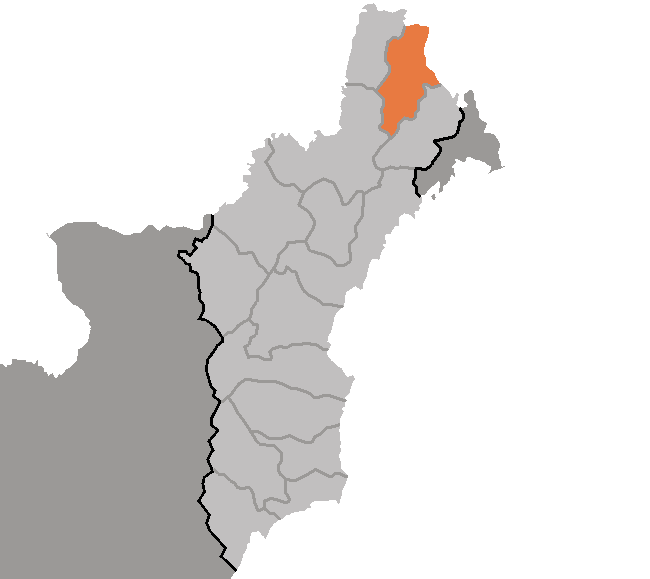
- Map of North Hamgyong showing the location of Kyongwon
- Country: North Korea
- Region: Kwanbuk
- Province: North Hamgyong
- Administrative divisions: 1 ŭp, 3 rodongjagu, 21 ri

Area
  - Total: 888 km^{2} (343 sq mi)

Population (2008)
  - Total: 107,327

Kyŏngwŏn County is a kun, or county, in North Hamgyong province, North Korea, located at 42°48′41″N 130°11′58″E, formerly known as Saebyŏl. It is bordered by the People's Republic of China to the north and east, Kyonghung to the southeast, Hoeryong to the southwest, and Onsong to the west.

The western region of Kyongwon is mountainous, while the east is relatively flat. The highest point is Chungsan. The largest river is the Tumen, which flows along the eastern border. Numerous tributaries of the Tumen also flow through the county. Approximately 75% of the county is forested.

Aside from agriculture, livestock raising and sericulture are widespread. The chief local crops are rice, corn, and soybeans. Bituminous coal is also mined.

Railroads passing through Kyongwon include the Hambuk and Kogonwon Lines. It is also connected by Shatuozi Border Road bridge to the Chinese city of Hunchun in the Yanbian autonomous prefecture.

== History ==
Under Joseon period Kyongwon was invaded by Jurchens tribes in 1409. Therefore, to safeguard his people from the hostile Chinese and Jurchen people (later known as Manchus) living in Manchuria, King Sejong the Great of Joseon ordered to establish there one of the six post/garrisons (hangul :육진 hanja :六鎭) in 1433. In 1977 the county's name was changed to Saebyol, but it was later reverted.

== Administrative divisions ==
Kyongwon County is divided into 1 town ("ŭp") 21 villages ("ri") and 3 worker's districts ("rodongjagu").

- Kyŏngwŏn-ŭp (Korean: 경원읍; Hancha: 慶源邑)
- Hamyŏn-rodongjagu (Korean: 하면로동자구; Hancha: 下面勞動者區)
- Kogŏnwŏn-rodongjagu (Korean: 고건원로동자구; Hancha: 古乾原勞動者區)
- Ryongbung-rodongjagu (Korean: 룡북로동자구; Hancha: 龍北勞動者區)
- Anwŏn-li (Korean: 안원리; Hancha: 安原里)
- Chongsal-li (Korean: 종산리; Hancha: 鍾山里)
- Chung'yŏng-ri (Korean: 중영리; Hancha: 中榮里)
- Hunyung-ri (Korean: 훈융리; Hancha: 訓戎里)
- Husŏng-ri (Korean: 후석리; Hancha: 厚石里)
- Kŭmdong-ri (Korean: 금동리; Hancha: 金洞里)
- Nongp'o-ri (Korean: 농포리; Hancha: 農圃里)
- Pongsal-li (Korean: 봉산리; Hancha: 鳳山里)
- Ryangdong-ri (Korean: 량동리; Hancha: 良洞里)
- Ryongdang-ri (Korean: 룡당리; Hancha: 龍堂里)
- Ryonggye-ri (Korean: 룡계리; Hancha: 龍溪里)
- Ryonghyŏl-li (Korean: 룡현리; Hancha: 龍峴里)
- Ryongmul-li (Korean: 룡문리; Hancha: 龍門里)
- Ryongnam-ri (Korean: 룡남리; Hancha: 龍南里)
- Ryongsil-li (Korean: 룡신리; Hancha: 龍新里)
- Ryudasŏm-ri (Korean: 류다섬리; Hancha: 柳多島里)
- Sasu-ri (Korean: 사수리; Hancha: 沙水里)
- Singŏn-li (Korean: 신건리; Hancha: 新乾里)
- Songnae-ri (Korean: 성내리; Hancha: 城內里)
- Tongnim-ri (Korean: 동림리; Hancha: 東林里)
- Yŏnsan-li (Korean: 연산리; Hancha: 硯山里)

Note: The Korean syllabe "som" (섬) in Ryudasom-ri, is converted into hanja "do" 島 because both of them means island in that case.

== See also ==
- North Hamgyong
- Geography of North Korea
- Administrative divisions of North Korea
