= Kangryong County =

Kangryŏng County 강령군
- County

Korean transcription(s)
  - Hanja: 康翎郡
  - McCune-Reischauer: Kangryŏng-gun
  - Revised Romanization: Gangryeong-gun
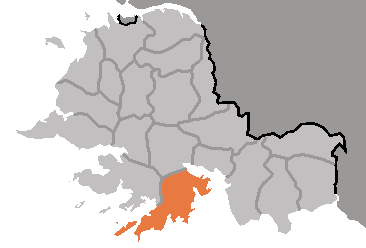
- Country: North Korea
- Province: South Hwanghae Province
- Administrative divisions: 1 ŭp, 31 ri

Area
  - Total: 522.7 km^{2} (201.8 sq mi)

Population (2008)
  - Total: 106,827
  - Density: 204.4/km^{2} (529.3/sq mi)

Kangryŏng County is a county in the South Hwanghae province of North Korea.

== Geography ==
Kangryŏng is bordered to the north by Pyŏksŏng, to the west by Ongjin, to the east by the Bay of Haeju and to the south by the Korea Bay. The county is situated on the western half of the Ongjin Peninsula, and most of the land is rocky and hilly with many coves and little flat land. There are also many islands in the seas surrounding the county, the largest being Sunwi-do, Ŏhwa-do, and the Suap Islands. The highest point is Mt. Ch'amnamu, at 286 meters.

Kangryŏng is famous for its seafaring bird populations, including the rare red-crowned crane. The county is the site of the large Kangryong Crane Habitat, one of four designated breeding sites in North Korea, and Natural Monument #130.

== History ==
Kangryŏng county was created under the Yi dynasty. It was briefly merged into the newly formed Hwanghae District in 1895 during an experimental redistricting, but was restored to its previous form in 1896. In 1909, it was incorporated into Ongjin. It was again made an independent municipality in the 1952 redistricting changes and received its old name.

== Transportation ==
Kangryŏng county is served by the Ongjin and Pup'o lines of the Korean State Railway, as well as an extensive network of roads.

== Administrative divisions ==
Kangryŏng is divided into one town (ŭp), one Worker's District (rodongjagu) and 31 villages (ri).

	Chosŏn'gŭl	Hancha
Kangryŏng-ŭp	강령읍	康翎邑
Pup'o-rodongjagu	부포노동자구	釜浦勞動者區
Hyangjug-ri	향죽리	香竹里
Inbong-ri	인봉리	仁鳳里
Kŭmdong-ri	금동리	金銅里
Kŭmjŏng-ri	금정리	錦井里
Kwangch'ŏl-li	광천리	廣天里
Naedong-ri	내동리	內洞里
Obong-ri	오봉리	梧鳳里
Ŏhwado-ri	어화도리	漁化島里
Pongo-ri	봉오리	峰梧里
Pumil-li	부민리	富民里
P'yŏnghwa-ri	평화리	平和里
Ryongyŏl-li	룡연리	龍淵里
Sambong-ri	삼봉리	三峰里
Sayol-li	사연리	舍鳶里
Sigyŏ-ri	식여리	食餘里
Sin'am-ri	신암리	新岩里
Songhyŏl-li	송현리	松峴里
Ssanggyo-ri	쌍교리	雙橋里
Suap-ri	수압리	睡鴨里
Sunwi-ri	순위리	巡威里
Tonggang-ri	동강리	東江里
Tongp'o-ri	동포리	東浦里
Tŭngam-ri	등암리	登岩里

== See also ==
- Geography of North Korea
- Administrative divisions of North Korea
