= Chaedong Line =

Railway line in North Korea

Overview
- Native name: 재동선 (梓洞線)
- Status: Operational
- Owner: West Chosen Central Railway (1941–1945); Korean State Railway (since 1945)
- Locale: South P'yŏngan
- Termini: Kujŏng; Chaedong
- Stations: 2

Service
- Type: Heavy rail, Freight rail

History
- Opened: 1 October 1941

Technical
- Line length: 4.4 km (2.7 mi)
- Number of tracks: Single track
- Track gauge: 1,435 mm (4 ft 8 1/2 in) standard gauge
- Electrification: 3000 V DC Catenary

- Chaedong Line
- Hangul: 재동선
- Hanja: 梓洞線
- RR: Jaedongseon
- MR: Chaedongsŏn

The Chaedong Line is an electrified railway line of the Korean State Railway in South P'yŏngan Province, North Korea, running from Kujŏng on the P'yŏngdŏk Line to Chaedong.

== History ==
The Chaedong Line was opened by the West Chosen Central Railway on 1 October 1941, at the same time as the railway's Sinsŏngch'ŏn–Pukch'ang line.

== Route ==
A yellow background in the "Distance" box indicates that section of the line is not electrified.

Distance (km)		Station Name		Former Name		
Total	S2S	Transcribed	Chosŏn'gŭl (Hanja)	Transcribed	Chosŏn'gŭl (Hanja)	Connections
0.0	0.0	Kujŏng	구정 (九井)			P'yŏngdŏk Line
4.4	4.4	Chaedong	재동 (梓洞)			
