= Kobi Line =

Railway line in North Korea

Overview
- Native name: 고비선 (高飛線)
- Status: Operational
- Owner: Chosen Government Railway (1934–1945); Korean State Railway (since 1945)
- Locale: P'yŏngyang-tŭkp'yŏlsi; North Hwanghae
- Termini: Ripsŏngri; Kobi
- Stations: 4

Service
- Type: Heavy rail, Freight rail

History
- Opened: 1 November 1934

Technical
- Line length: 14.5 km (9.0 mi)
- Number of tracks: Single track
- Track gauge: 1,435 mm (4 ft 8 1/2 in) standard gauge
- Electrification: 3000 V DC Catenary

- Kobi Line
- Hangul: 고비선
- Hanja: 高飛線
- RR: Gobiseon
- MR: Kobisŏn

The Kobi Line is an electrified railway line of the Korean State Railway in P'yŏngyang and in North Hwanghae Province, North Korea, running from Ripsŏngri on the P'yŏngdŏk Line to Kobi, with a branch to Namsan.

== History ==
The Kobi Line, together with Ripsŏngri Station, were opened by the Chosen Government Railway on 1 November 1934.

== Route ==
A yellow background in the "Distance" box indicates that section of the line is not electrified.

Distance (km)		Station Name		Former Name		
Total	S2S	Transcribed	Chosŏn'gŭl (Hanja)	Transcribed	Chosŏn'gŭl (Hanja)	Connections
0.0	0.0	Ripsŏngri	립석리 (立石里)			P'yŏngdŏk Line
6.2	6.2	Sinsŭngho	신승호 (新勝湖)			
		Samchŏng	삼청 (三靑)			
12.4	6.2	Tokgol	독골			(distance from Sinsŭngho)
14.5	8.3	Kobi	고비 (高飛)			(distance from Sinsŭngho)
