= Kogonwon Line =

Railway line in North Korea

Kogŏnwŏn Line

Overview
- Native name: 고건원선(古乾原線)
- Status: Operational
- Owner: Korean State Railway
- Locale: Kyŏngwon-gun, North Hamgyŏng
- Termini: Singŏn; Ryongsilli
- Stations: 5

Service
- Type: Heavy rail, Freight rail Regional rail
- Operator: Korean State Railway

Technical
- Line length: 20.4 km (12.7 mi)
- Number of tracks: Single track
- Track gauge: 1,435 mm (4 ft 8 1/2 in) standard gauge
Route map
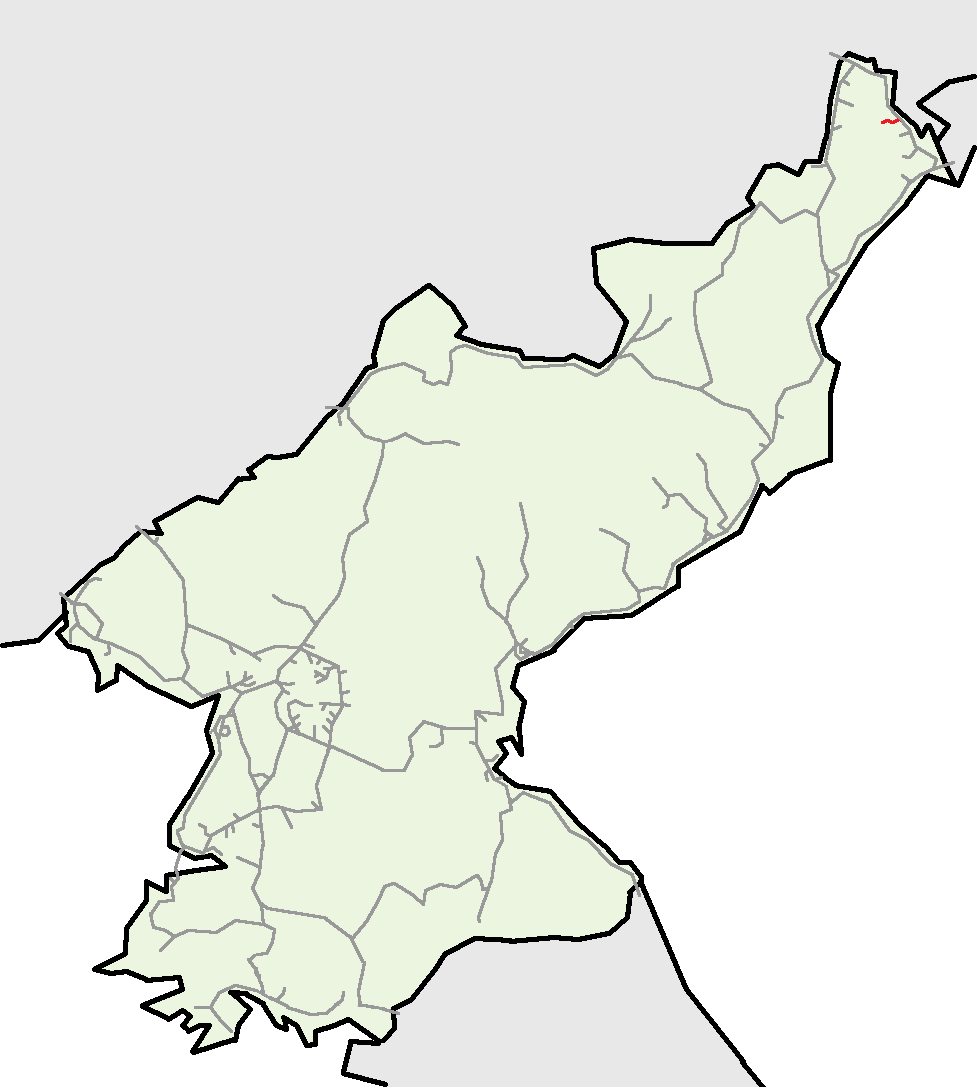

- Kogonwon Line
- Hangul: 고건원선
- Hanja: 古乾原線
- RR: Gogeonwonseon
- MR: Kogŏnwŏnsŏn

The Kogŏnwŏn Line is a non-electrified standard-gauge secondary line of the Korean State Railway in Kyŏngwon County, North Hamgyŏng Province, running from Singŏn on the Hambuk Line to Kogŏnwŏn.

== Route ==
A yellow background in the "Distance" box indicates that section of the line is not electrified.

Distance (km)		Station Name		Former Name		
Total	S2S	Transcribed	Chosŏn'gŭl (Hanja)	Transcribed	Chosŏn'gŭl (Hanja)	Connections
0.0	0.0	Singŏn	신건 (新乾)			Hambuk Line
3.9	3.9	Chŏngnam	정남 (鍾南)			Flag stop.
9.8	5.9	Kogŏnwŏn	고건원 (古乾原)			
12.3	2.5	Ryongbuk	룡북 (龍北)			Coal mine loading facility.
20.4	8.1	Ryongsilli	룡신리 (龍新里)			Coal mine loading facility.
