= Tukchang Line =

Railway line in North Korea

Tŭkchang Line

Overview
- Native name: 득장선 (得將線)
- Status: Operational
- Owner: Korean State Railway
- Locale: South P'yŏngan
- Termini: Pukch'ang; Sŏksan
- Stations: 5

Service
- Type: Heavy rail, Freight rail

History
- Opened: 1961

Technical
- Line length: 17.7 km (11.0 mi)
- Number of tracks: Single track
- Track gauge: 1,435 mm (4 ft 8 1/2 in) standard gauge
- Electrification: 3000 V DC Catenary

- Tukchang Line
- Hangul: 득장선
- Hanja: 得將線
- RR: Deukjangseon
- MR: Tŭkchangsŏn

The Tŭkchang Line is an electrified railway line of the Korean State Railway in South P'yŏngan Province, North Korea, running from Pukch'ang on the P'yŏngdŏk Line to Sŏksan.

== History ==
The line was opened in 1961 to assist with the construction of the Pukch'ang Thermal Power Complex which began in that year.

== Services ==
The important Pukch'ang Thermal Power Complex - the largest coal-fired power plant in the DPRK - is located on this line at Yangch'on, receiving a great deal of coal from the mines in the area.

== Route ==
A yellow background in the "Distance" box indicates that section of the line is not electrified.

Distance (km)		Station Name		Former Name		
Total	S2S	Transcribed	Chosŏn'gŭl (Hanja)	Transcribed	Chosŏn'gŭl (Hanja)	Connections
0.0	0.0	Pukch'ang	북창 (北倉)			P'yŏngdŏk Line, Kwanha Line
3.4	3.4	Yangch'on	양촌 (陽村)			Pukch'ang Thermal Power Complex
10.3	6.9	Ryongsan	룡산 (龍山)			
15.0	4.7	Tŭkchang	득장 (得將)			Myŏnghak Line
17.7	2.7	Sŏksan	석산 (石山)			
