= Changhung Line =

Railway line in North Korea

Ch'anghŭng Line

Overview
- Native name: 창흥선 (昌興線)
- Status: Operational
- Owner: Korean State Railway
- Locale: South Hamgyŏng
- Termini: Ch'anghŭng; Ryŏnhŭng
- Stations: 2

Service
- Type: Heavy rail, Freight rail
- Operator(s): Korean State Railway

Technical
- Line length: 8.3 km (5.2 mi)
- Number of tracks: Single track
- Track gauge: 1,435 mm (4 ft 8 1/2 in) standard gauge
- Electrification: 3000 V DC Catenary

- Changhung Line
- Hangul: 창흥선
- Hanja: 昌興線
- RR: Changheungseon
- MR: Ch'anghŭngsŏn

The Ch'anghŭng Line is an electrified standard-gauge secondary line of the Korean State Railway in South Hamgyŏng Province, North Korea, running from Ch'anghŭng on the P'yŏngra Line to Ryŏnhŭng.

== Route ==
A yellow background in the "Distance" box indicates that section of the line is not electrified.

| Distance (km) | | Station Name | | Former Name | | |
| Total | S2S | Transcribed | Chosŏn'gŭl (Hanja) | Transcribed | Chosŏn'gŭl (Hanja) | Connections |
|---|---|---|---|---|---|---|
| 0.0 | 0.0 | Ch'anghŭng | 창흥 (昌興) | Pon'gung | 본궁 (本宮) | P'yŏngra Line |
| 8.3 | 8.3 | Ryŏnhŭng | 련흥 (蓮興) | | | |
