= Toksan Line =

Railway line in Pyongyang, North Korea

Tŏksan Line

Overview
- Native name: 덕산선 (德山線)
- Status: Closed
- Owner: Korean State Railway
- Locale: Kangdong-gun, P'yŏngyang-tŭkp'yŏlsi
- Termini: Songga; Tŏksan
- Stations: 2

Service
- Type: Heavy rail, Freight rail
- Operator(s): Korean State Railway

Technical
- Line length: 1.7 km (1.1 mi)
- Number of tracks: Single track
- Track gauge: 1,435 mm (4 ft 8 1/2 in) standard gauge

- Toksan Line
- Hangul: 덕산선
- Hanja: 德山線
- RR: Deoksanseon
- MR: Tŏksansŏn

The Tŏksan Line was a former non-electrified railway line of the Korean State Railway in Kangdong County, P'yŏngyang, North Korea, which ran from Songga on the P'yŏngdŏk Line to Tŏksan.

== Route ==
A yellow background in the "Distance" box indicates that section of the line is not electrified.

Distance (km)		Station Name		Former Name		
Total	S2S	Transcribed	Chosŏn'gŭl (Hanja)	Transcribed	Chosŏn'gŭl (Hanja)	Connections
0.0	0.0	Songga	송가 (松街)			P'yŏngdŏk Line
~~1.7~~	~~1.7~~	Tŏksan	덕산 (德山)			Closed
