= Pyongdok Line =

Railway line in North Korea

P'yŏngdŏk Line

Overview
- Native name: 평덕선(平德線)
- Status: Operational
- Owner: Chosen Government Railway (1911–1945); West Chosen Central Railway (1939–1945); Korean State Railway (since 1945)
- Locale: P'yŏngyang; North Hwanghae; South Pyŏngan; North Pyŏngan
- Termini: Taedonggang; Kujang Ch'ŏngnyŏn
- Stations: 37

Service
- Type: Heavy rail, Regional rail
- Depot(s): P'yŏngyang

History
- Opened: P'yŏngyang Colliery Line: 1911–1918; Sŏsŏn Line: 1939–1945; Tŏkpal Line: 1945–1954

Technical
- Line length: 192.3 km (119.5 mi)
- Number of tracks: Single track
- Track gauge: 1,435 mm (4 ft 8 1/2 in) standard gauge
- Minimum radius: 250 m (820 ft)
- Electrification: 3000 V DC Catenary
- Maximum incline: 20‰
Route map
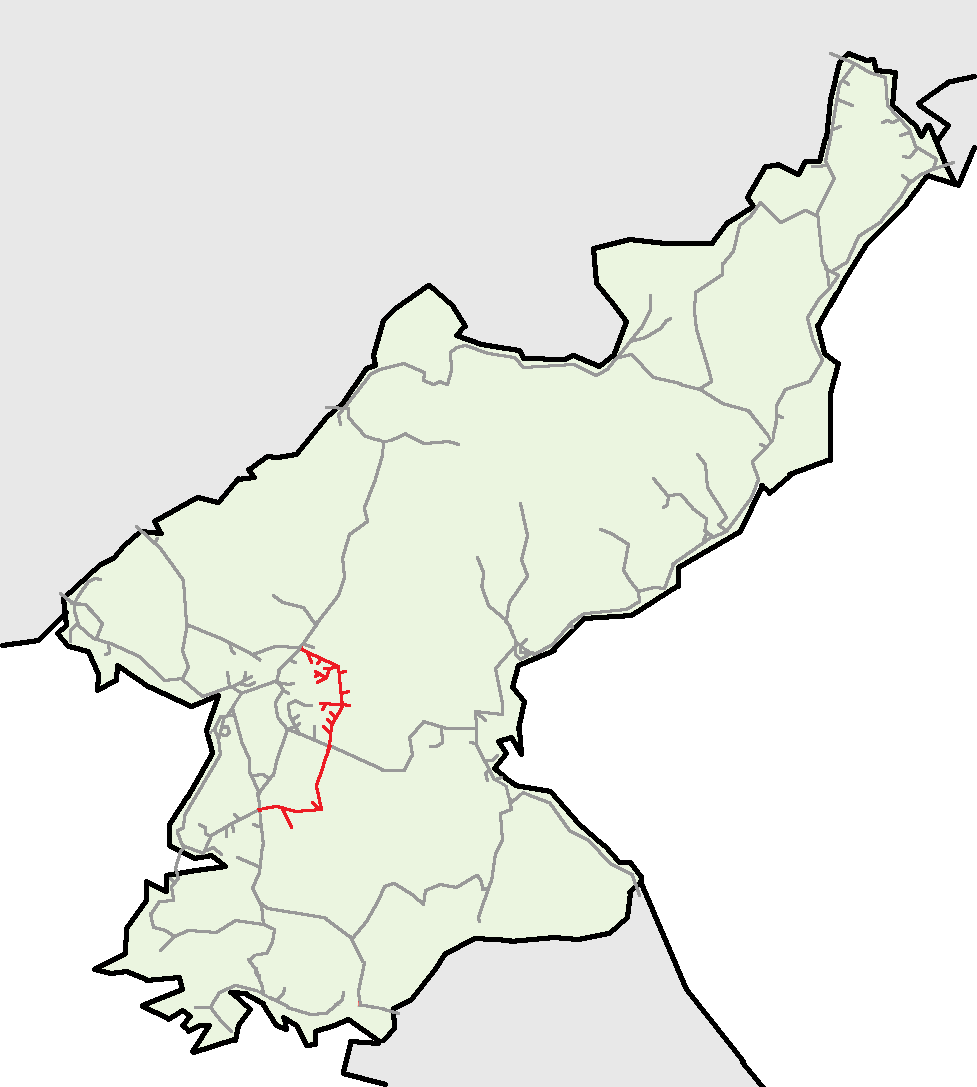

- Pyongdok Line
- Hangul: 평덕선
- Hanja: 平德線
- RR: Pyeongdeokseon
- MR: P'yŏngdŏksŏn

The P'yŏngdŏk Line is an electrified standard-gauge trunk line of the Korean State Railway in North Korea running from Taedonggang Station in P'yŏngyang, where it connects to the P'yŏngbu, P'yŏngnam, P'yŏngra and P'yŏngŭi Lines, to Kujang, where it connects to the Manp'o and Ch'ŏngnyŏn P'arwŏn Lines. The total length of the line is 192.3 km (119.5 mi).

== Description ==
The P'yŏngdŏk Line is currently under the jurisdiction of the P'yŏngyang Railway Bureau (Taedonggang–Hyangwŏn section), and of the Kaech'ŏn Railway Bureau (Tuillyŏng–Kujang section). Economically, it is a very important line, connecting P'yŏngyang with the coal mining and industrial centres of Pukch'ang, Tŏkch'ŏn and the South and North P'yŏngan provinces.

Numerous secondary lines connect to the P'yŏngdŏk Line, including those to Ryŏngdae, Myŏnghak, Sŏch'ang and Changsang. Many of these branchlines are to coal mines that send coal to the Pukch'ang Thermal Power Complex, and to other industrial centres and power plants.

There are 38 stations on the line, not including Taedonggang (which "belongs" to the P'yŏngbu Line), Sinsŏngch'ŏn (P'yŏngra Line) and Kujang Ch'ŏngnyŏn (Manp'o Line). Of these, 33 are regular intermediate stations. There is also a freight station at Mirim, one halt, and three signal stations. Passing through mountainous territory, the P'yŏngdŏk Line thus features many bridges and tunnels. Through the Myŏhyang mountains around Tuillyŏng the ruling grade is 20‰ and the minimum radius of curves is 250 m (820 ft), while on the Sinsŏngch'ŏn–Tŏkch'ŏn section the ruling grade is 17‰ with a minimum curve radius of 300 m (980 ft). There are 90 bridges with a total length of 3,916 m (12,848 ft), and 52 tunnels with a total length of 10,345 m (33,940 ft) – 5.4% of the line's length is through tunnels.

== History ==
The P'yŏngdŏk Line was formed by the Korean State Railway by merging the P'yŏngyang Colliery Line, the Sŏsŏn Line, and the Tŏkpal Line.

=== P'yŏngyang Colliery Line ===
The P'yŏngyang Colliery Line (평양탄광선, P'yŏngyang T'an'gwang-sŏn; 平壤炭鑛線, Heijō tankō-sen) was opened by the Chosen Government Railway (Sentetsu) in two parts to exploit the rich anthracite deposits of the area. The first section, 10.1 km (6.3 mi) from P'yŏngyang to Sadong, was opened on 1 September 1911. Seven years later, on 5 May 1918 a 15.8 km (9.8 mi) extension from Sadong to Sŭnghori was opened. The stations at Taedonggang and Sadong were opened in 1911, while the stations at Mirim and Sŭngho-ri were opened in 1918, and the station at Sŏn'gyori on 15 October 1920. Sentetsu then opened the station at Ch'ŏngryong and the Myŏngdang Line on 1 November 1925, followed by the station at Ripsŏngri and the Kobi Line on 1 November 1934.

Initially, the line was opened as a freight-only line, shipping around 127,000 t (140,000 short tons) of anthracite annually from the mines around Sadong to the Naval Briquette Factory in Tokuyama, Japan, via the port at Namp'o. In 1919, the line was opened to passenger traffic, with two return trips operating between P'yŏngyang and Sŭnghori daily; these trains ran with third-class cars only, and a ticket for the full distance cost 40 sen in 1920.

=== Sŏsŏn Line ===
The privately owned West Chosen Central Railway (서선중앙철도, Sŏsŏn Chung'ang Ch'ŏldo; 西鮮中央鐵道, Sōsen Chūō Tetsudō) opened its mainline, called the Sŏsŏn Line ("West Chosen Line") from Sŭnghori to Chang'an (now Namdŏk) in several stages between 1939 and 1945. The first section, 29.6 km (18.4 mi) from Sŭnghori to Sŏngrŭm, was opened on 29 June 1939, followed five months later by an 8.5 km (5.3 mi) extension to P'yŏngnam Kangdong (now just Kangdong).

On 1 October 1941 the West Chosen Central Railway opened a second section of the Sŏsŏn Line, isolated from the first, made up of a 36.1 km (22.4 mi) mainline running from Sinsŏngch'ŏn to Pukch'ang and a 4.4 km (2.7 mi) branchline from Kujŏng to Chaedong (the Chaedong Line). The two sections of mainline remained isolated from each other until 18 September 1942, when the gap between P'yŏngnam Kangdong and Sinsŏngch'ŏn, a distance of 30.3 km (18.8 mi) was closed. The newly built line did not long remain part of the West Chosen railway, as on 1 April 1944 the line from Sŭngho-ri all the way to Sinsŏngch'ŏn was transferred to Sentetsu and incorporated into the P'yŏngyang Colliery Line.

The West Chosen Central Railway nevertheless continued expanding its truncated mainline, receiving approval from the Railway Bureau on 21 June 1940 to extend its line to Tŏkch'ŏn and thence onwards to the Changsang coal fields, in order to transport coal from the mines in the area opened in 1938 by the Chosen Anthracite Company. The first of these extensions was a 5.9 km (3.7 mi) stretch from Pukch'ang to Okch'ŏn opened on 28 December 1944, which was followed by a second extension, 6.4 km (4.0 mi) to Chang'an, opened on 25 May 1945. Tokch'ŏn was reached a few months later.

=== Tŏkp'al Line ===
The plan was to continue from Tŏkch'ŏn via Changsangri to Kujang, where it would link up with Sentetsu's Manp'o Line, and on to P'arwŏn, but construction of this line - called the Tŏkp'al Line - was finished only as far as Changsangri by the end of the Pacific War. The terrain beyond Changsangri proved too difficult to work through, necessitating a new route to Kujang. After adding a new station at Hyangjang, 5.7 km (3.5 mi) from Hyangwŏn towards Changsangri, construction on what became the current alignment of the line to Kujang began. However, this wasn't completed before war's end; it was only in 1954 after the end of the Korean War that the connection to P'arwŏn (the line's name came from the two termini, Tŏkch'ŏn and P'alwŏn) via Kujang was finally made.

=== P'yŏngdŏk Line ===
After the end of the Pacific War and subsequent partition of Korea, both the West Chosen Central Railway and the parts of Sentetsu within the newly established DPRK were nationalised, becoming part of the Korean State Railway. The P'yŏngyang Colliery Line (P'yŏngyang–Sinsŏngch'ŏn) and the Sŏsŏn Line (Sinsŏngch'ŏn–Tŏkch'ŏn) were merged to form the P'yŏngdŏk Line (the name coming from the two termini, P'yŏngyang and Tŏkch'ŏn); after the Tŏkp'al Line was extended to Kujang after the end of the Korean War, the Hyangjang–Kujang was later merged with the P'yŏngdŏk Line (the Kujang–P'arwŏn section became part of the Ch'ŏngnyŏn P'arwon Line, but the line's name was not changed. Also, the section from Taedonggang to Mirim was subsequently realigned after the end of the Korean War, during which the line was heavily damaged. The new alignment was about 1.5 km (0.93 mi) longer than the old section. Electrification of the line was completed in June 1979.

Line	Section	Opened	Builder	Notes
P'yŏngyang Colliery Line	P'yŏngyang–Sadong	1 September 1911	Chosen Government Railway	
P'yŏngyang Colliery Line	Sadong–Sŭnghori	5 May 1918	Chosen Government Railway	
Sŏsŏn Line	Sŭnghori–Sŏngnŭm	29 June 1939	West Chosen Central Railway	to Sentetsu 4/1/1944
Sŏsŏn Line	Sŏngnŭm–P'yŏngnam Kangdong	November 1939	West Chosen Central Railway	to Sentetsu 4/1/1944
Sŏsŏn Line	Sinsŏngch'ŏn–Pukch'ang	1 October 1941	West Chosen Central Railway	
Chaedong Line	Kujŏng–Chaedong	1 October 1941	West Chosen Central Railway	
Sŏsŏn Line	P'yŏngnam Kangdong–Sinsŏngch'ŏn	18 September 1942	West Chosen Central Railway	to Sentetsu 4/1/1944
Sŏsŏn Line	Pukch'ang–Okch'ŏn	28 December 1944	West Chosen Central Railway	
Sŏsŏn Line	Okch'ŏn–Chang'an	15 May 1945	West Chosen Central Railway	
Sŏsŏn Line	Chang'an–Tŏkch'ŏn	1945	West Chosen Central Railway	
Tŏkpal Line	Tŏkch'ŏn–Changsangri	1945	West Chosen Central Railway	
Tŏkpal Line	Hyangjang–Kujang–P'arwŏn	1954	Korean State Railway	

== Modernisation ==
On 21 October 2014 a groundbreaking ceremony for the Sŭngri ("Victory") project to modernise the P'yŏngnam Line from Namp'o to P'yŏngyang and the P'yŏngdŏk Line from P'yŏngyang to Chedong was held. The project, supported by Russia, is intended to form the first stage of a larger-scale cooperation with the Russian Railways as part of a 20-year development project that would modernise around 3,500 km (2,200 mi) of the North Korean rail network, and would include the construction of a north-south freight bypass around P'yŏngyang. The overall project cost is estimated to be around US $25 billion, and it is expected that exports of coal, rare-earth and non-ferrous metals from the DPRK to Russia will provide the funding for the project.

== Services ==
=== Freight ===
On the P'yŏngdŏk Line, freight traffic is vastly greater in the southbound direction than northbound - 3.5-8 times greater on the Taedonggang–Sinsŏngch'ŏn section and 6-15.3 times greater on the Sinsŏngch'ŏn–Tŏkch'ŏn–Kujang section. The bulk of the southbound freight traffic is anthracite from the coal fields of North and South P'yŏngan provinces, accounting for anywhere from 55.4% to 99.2% of southbound freight. However, it also accounts for 35.4% of northbound freight on the Sinsŏngch'ŏn–Pukch'ang section, as some of the anthracite extracted at the Ryŏngdae, Chaedong and Solgol mines are shipped to the Pukch'ang Thermal Power Complex - the largest in the DPRK - for fuel.

Cement, ore, stone, fertiliser, wood and metals make up the largest part of northbound cargo. Between Taedonggang and Sinsŏngch'ŏn it is mostly cement, ore, grain, fertilisers and metals, whilst on the Sinsŏngch'ŏn–Tŏkch'ŏn–Kujang section it is primarily wood, cement and fertiliser.

Cement is shipped from the Sŭngho-ri Cement Factory at Sŭnghori. Steel and metals from the Ch'ŏllima Steel Complex on the P'yŏngnam Line and from the Hwanghae Iron & Steel Complex at Changch'ŏlli on the Songrim Line are shipped via the P'yŏngdŏk Line to various factories along the line, including the Sŭngri Motor Plant at Tŏkch'ŏn.

The freight-only station at Mirim is responsible for handling freight for the Taedonggang-guyŏk, Taesong-guyŏk and Sadong-guyŏk districts of P'yŏngyang. The main commodities arriving there are anthracite from Namdŏk, Hŭngryŏng and elsewhere, and cement from Sŭnghori.

The freight yard at Kangdong station handles freight for Kangdong and Hoech'ang counties, and for P'yŏngyang's Samsŏk-kuyŏk district. The main commodities arriving there are fertiliser, steel and cement. Cement arrives from the Sŭnghori Cement Factory, from the 2.8 Cement Complex at West Pongsan on the Pongsan Line, and from Taegŏn on the Taegŏn Line. Steel is from the Hwanghae Iron & Steel Works on the Songrim Line, while fertiliser comes from the Namhŭng Youth Chemical Complex at Namhŭng on the Namhŭng Line, from Hŭngnam and Chisu on the P'yŏngra Line, and from Namp'o. The main commodities shipped from Kangdong are chrysotile asbestos and thread.

The main commodities arriving at Sŏngch'ŏn freight yard are anthracite and fertiliser. Anthracite is shipped here from Sŏch'ang, Namdŏk, Chaedong and Ryŏngdae; fertiliser comes from Hŭngnam and Namhŭng. The main shipments from Sŏngch'ŏn are non-ferrous metal ores, sand, tobacco, metal and logs. The ores and logs are shipped to Munch'ŏn and Haeju, while the sand and tobacco is shipped to P'yŏngyang.

Sŭnghori and Pukch'ŏn are important stations on the P'yŏngdŏk Line. Arriving freight at Sŭnghori is mostly destined for the Sŭnghori Cement Factory, including coal from Hŭngryong, marble from P'yŏngsan on the P'yŏngbu Line and gypsum from Sujin on the Tŏkhyŏn Line. Although most of the cement produced there is sent to P'yŏngyang, a portion is sent to places along the P'yŏngdŏk Line such as Kangdong, Sŏngch'ŏn, Pukch'ang and Tŏkch'ŏn. At Pukch'ŏn the main customer is the massive Pukch'ŏn Thermal Power Complex, receiving tens of thousands of tons coal daily from Okch'ŏn, Ryongsan and Sŏksan on the Soksan Line, Myŏnghak, Solgol, Chenam, Hoe'an, Sŏch'ang, Hyangwŏn, Changsang and Tŏngnam. In addition, Pukch'ang has a large aluminium plant, a soybean-processing plant and a machinery factory.

=== Passenger ===
The following passenger trains are known to operate on this line:

- Semi-express trains 117/118, operating between Taedonggang and P'yŏnggang, run on this line between Taedonggang and Sinsŏngch'ŏn;
- Semi-express trains 138-139/140-141, operating between Manp'o Ch'ŏngnyŏn and Changyŏn, run on this line between Kujang and Taedonggang;
- Regional trains 226-227/228-229, operating between Tŏkch'ŏn and P'yŏngnam Onch'ŏn, run on this line between Tŏkch'ŏn and P'yŏngyang;
- Regional trains 231/232 operate between Taedonggang and T'ŏkch'ŏn;
- Regional trains 236-237/238-239, operating between Sariwŏn Ch'ŏngnyŏn and T'ŏkch'ŏn, run on this line between Taedonggang and Tŏkch'ŏn;
- Local trains 302-303/304-305, operating between Sunan and Kangdong, run on this line between P'yŏngyang and Kangdong;
- Local trains 702/703 and 704/705, operate between East P'yŏngyang and Myŏngdang;
- Local trains 723/724 operate between Tŏkch'ŏn and Hyŏngbong;
- Local trains 781/782 operate between Tŏkch'ŏn and Kujang.

== Route ==
A yellow background in the "Distance" box indicates that section of the line is not electrified.

Distance (km)								
Current		Original		Station Name		Former Name		
Total	S2S	Total	S2S	Transcribed	Chosŏn'gŭl (Hanja)	Transcribed	Chosŏn'gŭl (Hanja)	Connections (former)
-2.6	-2.6	-2.6	-2.6	P'yŏngyang	평양 (平壤)			P'yŏngŭi Line, P'yŏngdŏk Line, ● Ch'ŏllima Line Yŏnggwang Station ● Tram Line 1
0.0	0.0	0.0	0.0	Taedonggang	대동강 (大同江)			P'yŏngbu Line ● Tram Line 2
3.2	3.2	--	--	East P'yŏngyang	동평양 (東平壤)			
--	--	3.3	3.3	Sŏn'gyori	선교리 (船橋里)			Closed
6.4	3.2	--	--	Songsin	송신 (松新)			
--	--	7.5	4.2	Sadŏng	사덩 (寺洞)			Closed
13.4	7.0	10.8	3.3	Mirim	미림 (美林)			
19.3	5.9	16.7	5.9	Ch'ŏngryong	청룡 (靑龍)			Myŏngdang Line
21.1	1.8	18.5	1.8	Ripsŏngri	립석리 (立石里)			Kobi Line
25.9	4.8	23.3; 0.0	4.8; 0.0	Sŭnghori	승호리 (勝湖里)			Formerly division point between P'yŏngyang Colliery Line and Sŏsŏn Line.
30.1	4.2	4.2	4.2	Mandalli	만달리 (晩達里)			
33.9	3.8	8.0	3.8	Hwach'ŏn	화천 (貨泉)			
38.6	4.7	12.7	4.7	Kŭmok	금옥 (金玉)			
41.8	3.2	15.9	3.2	Songga	송가 (松街)			(Tŏksan Line)
48.2	6.4	22.3	6.4	Samdŭng	삼등 (三登)			(Samdŭng Colliery Line)
51.5	3.3	25.6	3.3	Hŭngryŏng	흑령 (黑嶺)			
55.5	4.0	29.6	4.0	Sŏngrŭm	석름 (石廩)			
64.0	8.5	38.1	8.5	Kangdong	강동 (江東)	P'yŏngnam Kangdong	평남강동 (平南江東)	
72.0	8.0	46.1	8.0	Paegwŏn	백원 (百源)			
↓	↓	52.3	6.2	Sundŏk	순덕 (順德)			Closed.
81.2	9.2	55.3	3.0	Sŏngch'ŏn	성천 (成川)	P'yŏngnam Sŏngch'ŏn	평남성천 (平南成川)	
88.2	7.0	62.3	7.0	Samdŏk	삼덕 (三德)			
94.3	6.1	68.4	6.1	Sinsŏngch'ŏn	신성천 (新成川)			P'yŏngra Line
101.7	7.4	75.8	7.4	Kŭmp'yŏng	금평 (錦坪)	P'ungp'yŏng	풍평 (豊坪)	
107.4	5.7	81.5	5.7	Wŏnch'ang	원창 (院倉)			Ryŏngdae Line
111.0	3.6	85.1	3.6	Kujŏng	구정 (九井)			Chaedong Line
118.0	7.0	92.1	7.0	Songnam Ch'ŏngnyŏn	송남청년 (松南靑年)	Songnam	송남 (松南)	Solgol Colliery Line
122.0	4.0	96.1	4.0	Kach'ang	가창 (假倉)			
130.4	8.4	104.5	8.4	Pukch'ang	북창 (北倉)			Kwanha Line, Tŭkchang Line
133.9	3.5	108.0	3.5	Okch'ŏn	옥천 (玉泉)			Tŭkchang Line
136.3	2.4	110.4	2.4	Kuhyŏn	구현 (鳩峴)			Ingp'o Line
139.7	3.4	113.8	3.4	Hoe'an	회안 (檜安)			
145.1	5.4	119.2	5.4	Namdŏk	남덕 (南德)	Chang'an	장안 (長安)	
149.1	4.0	123.2	4.0	Chenam	제남 (濟南)			
152.8	3.7	126.9	3.7	Namdŏkch'ŏn	남덕천 (南德川)			Tŏngnam Line
154.8	2.0	128.9; 0.0	2.0; 0.0	Tŏkch'ŏn	덕천 (德川)			Sŏch'ang Line; Formerly division point between Sŏsŏn Line and Tŏkpal Line.
159.5	4.7	4.7	4.7	Hyangwŏn	향원 (鄕元)			
165.2	5.7	10.4	5.7	Hyangjang	향장 (鄕長)			Changsang Line
169.4	4.2	14.6	4.2	Tuillyŏng	두일령 (杜日嶺)			
178.2	7.8	22.4	7.8	Hamga	함가 (咸家)			
↓	↓	24.6	2.2	Kudan	구단 (坵丹)			Closed.
192.3	14.1	36.5	11.9	Kujang Ch'ŏngnyŏn	구장청년 (球場靑年)	Kujang	구장 (球場)	Ch'ŏngnyŏn P'arwŏn Line, Manp'o Line, Ryong'am Line
