= Pupo Line =

Railway line in North Korea

Overview
- Native name: 부포선(釜浦線)
- Status: Operational
- Owner: Korean State Railway
- Locale: Kangryŏng-gun, South Hwanghae
- Termini: Sin'gangryŏng; Pup'o
- Stations: 5

Service
- Type: Heavy rail, Regional rail, Freight rail

History
- Opened: 1970s

Technical
- Line length: 19.1 km (11.9 mi)
- Number of tracks: Single track
- Track gauge: 1,435 mm (4 ft 8 1/2 in) standard gauge
Route map
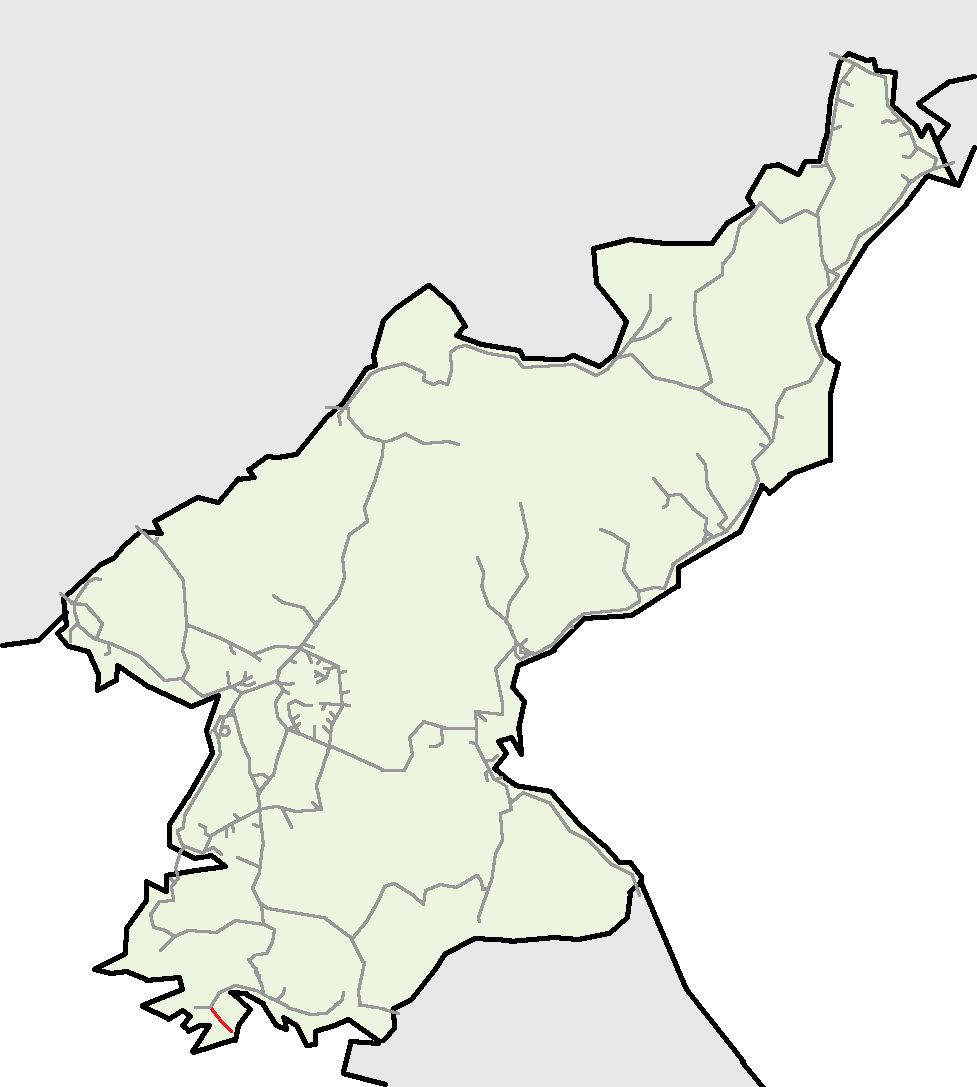

- Pupo Line
- Hangul: 부포선
- Hanja: 釜浦線
- RR: Buposeon
- MR: Pup'osŏn

The Pup'o Line is a non-electrified standard-gauge secondary railway line of the Korean State Railway in Kangryŏng-gun, South Hwanghae Province, North Korea, running from Sin'gangryŏng on the Ongjin Line to Pup'o.

== History ==
The line was opened by the Korean State Railway in the 1970s.

== Route ==
A yellow background in the "Distance" box indicates that section of the line is not electrified.

Distance (km)		Station Name		Former Name		
Total	S2S	Transcribed	Chosŏn'gŭl (Hanja)	Transcribed	Chosŏn'gŭl (Hanja)	Connections
0.0	0.0	Sin'gangryŏng	신강령 (新康翎)			Ongjin Line
7.2	7.2	Kangryŏng	강령 (康翎)			Distance is approximate.
11.3	4.1	Ryongyŏn	룡연 (龍淵)			Distance is approximate.
15.2	3.9	Hyangjuk	향죽 (香竹)			Distance is approximate.
19.1	3.4	Pup'o	부포 (釜浦)			
