= Ryongdae Line =

Railway in South Pyongan, North Korea

Ryŏngdae Line

Overview
- Native name: 령대선 (靈坮線)
- Status: Operational
- Owner: Korean State Railway
- Locale: South P'yŏngan
- Termini: Wŏnch'ang; Ryŏngdae
- Stations: 2

Service
- Type: Heavy rail, Freight rail
- Operator(s): Korean State Railway

Technical
- Line length: 7.1 km (4.4 mi)
- Number of tracks: Single track
- Track gauge: 1,435 mm (4 ft 8 1/2 in) standard gauge
- Electrification: 3000 V DC Catenary

- Ryongdae Line
- Hangul: 령대선
- Hanja: 靈坮線
- RR: Ryeongdaeseon
- MR: Ryŏngdaesŏn

The Ryŏngdae Line is an electrified railway line of the Korean State Railway in South P'yŏngan Province, North Korea, running from Wŏnch'ang on the P'yŏngdŏk Line to Ryŏngdae.

== Route ==
A yellow background in the "Distance" box indicates that section of the line is not electrified.

Distance (km)		Station Name		Former Name		
Total	S2S	Transcribed	Chosŏn'gŭl (Hanja)	Transcribed	Chosŏn'gŭl (Hanja)	Connections
0.0	0.0	Wŏnch'ang	원창 (院倉)			P'yŏngdŏk Line
4.9	4.9	Ryŏngdae	령대 (靈坮)			
