= Ingpo Line =

Railway line in North Korea

Ingp'o Line

Overview
- Native name: 잉포선 (芿浦線)
- Status: Operational
- Owner: Korean State Railway
- Locale: South P'yŏngan
- Termini: Kuhyŏn; Ingp'o
- Stations: 2

Service
- Type: Heavy rail, Freight rail
- Operator: Korean State Railway

Technical
- Line length: 8.8 km (5.5 mi)
- Number of tracks: Single track
- Track gauge: 1,435 mm (4 ft 8 1/2 in) standard gauge
- Electrification: 3000 V DC Catenary

- Ingpo Line
- Hangul: 잉포선
- Hanja: 芿浦線
- RR: Ingposeon
- MR: Ingp'osŏn

The Ingp'o Line is an electrified railway line of the Korean State Railway in South P'yŏngan Province, North Korea, running from Kuhyŏng on the P'yŏngdŏk Line to Ingp'o.

== Route ==
A yellow background in the "Distance" box indicates that section of the line is not electrified.

Distance (km)		Station Name		Former Name		
Total	S2S	Transcribed	Chosŏn'gŭl (Hanja)	Transcribed	Chosŏn'gŭl (Hanja)	Connections
0.0	0.0	Kuhyŏn	구현 (鳩峴)			P'yŏngdŏk Line
8.8	8.8	Ingp'o	잉포 (芿浦)			
