= Changsang Line =

Railway line in North Korea

Overview
- Native name: 장상선 (長上線)
- Status: Operational
- Owner: West Chosen Central Railway (1945); Korean State Railway (since 1945)
- Locale: South P'yŏngan
- Termini: Hyangjang; Changsang
- Stations: 2

Service
- Type: Heavy rail, Freight rail

History
- Opened: 1945

Technical
- Line length: 1.9 km (1.2 mi)
- Number of tracks: Single track
- Track gauge: 1,435 mm (4 ft 8 1/2 in) standard gauge
- Electrification: 3000 V DC Catenary

- Changsang Line
- Hangul: 장상선
- Hanja: 長上線
- RR: Jangsangseon
- MR: Changsangsŏn

The Changsang Line is an electrified freight-only railway line of the Korean State Railway in South P'yŏngan Province, North Korea, running from Hyangjang on the P'yŏngdŏk Line to Changsang.

== History ==
On 21 June 1940, the West Chosen Central Railway, which since 1939 had been operating a line between Sŭnghori and P'yŏngnam Kangdong, received approval from the Railway Bureau of the Government-General of Korea to build a line to the Changsang coal fields via Tŏkch'ŏn; the Chosen Anthracite Company had opened mines around Changsang and Tŏkch'ŏn in 1938

From Tŏkch'ŏn, which it had reached in the summer of 1945, the West Chosen Central Railway planned its Tŏkpal Line (덕팔선; 德八線) line to run from Tŏkch'ŏn to Kujang via Changsangri (today's Changsang Station), to connect there with the Chosen Government Railway's Manp'o Line. However, the terrain proved too difficult, and, after adding a signal station at Hyangjang between Hyangwŏn and Changsangri, construction on the current alignment of the line to Kujang began. However, this wasn't completed before the end of the Pacific War, and it was only after the end of the Korean War that the connection to Kujang and the Manp'o Line was finally made.

After the partition of Korea following Japan's defeat in the war, all railways in North Korea were nationalised and made part of the Korean State Railway. The P'yŏngyang Colliery Line (P'yŏngyang–Sinsŏngch'ŏn) and the former West Chosen Central Railway mainline (Sinsŏngch'ŏn–Tŏkch'ŏn) were joined together to form the P'yŏngdŏk Line; after the Tŏkpal Line was extended to Kujang after the end of the Korean War, it was later merged with the P'yŏngdŏk Line, but the line's name was not changed, while the Hyangjang–Changsangri section became the Changsang Line. Electrification of the line was completed in June 1979.

== Route ==
A yellow background in the "Distance" box indicates that section of the line is not electrified.

Distance (km)		Station Name		Former Name		
Total	S2S	Transcribed	Chosŏn'gŭl (Hanja)	Transcribed	Chosŏn'gŭl (Hanja)	Connections
-5.7	0.0	Hyangwŏn	향원 (鄕元)			P'yŏngdŏk Line
0.0	5.7	Hyangjang	향장 (鄕長)			P'yŏngdŏk Line
1.9	1.9	Changsang	장상 (長上)	Changsangri	장상리 (長上里)	
