= Samdung Tangwang Line =

Railway in Pyongyang, North Korea

Samdŭng T'an'gwang Line

Overview
- Other name(s): Samdŭng Colliery Line
- Native name: 삼등탄광선 (三登炭鑛線)
- Status: Closed
- Owner: Korean State Railway
- Locale: Kangdong-gun, P'yŏngyang-tŭkp'yŏlsi
- Termini: Samdŭng; Taeri
- Stations: 2

Service
- Type: Heavy rail, Freight rail
- Operator(s): Korean State Railway

Technical
- Line length: 4.8 km (3.0 mi)
- Number of tracks: Single track
- Track gauge: 1,435 mm (4 ft 8 1/2 in) standard gauge

- Samdung Tangwang Line
- Chosŏn'gŭl: 삼등탄광선
- Hancha: 三登炭鑛線
- Revised Romanization: Samdeungtangwangseon
- McCune–Reischauer: Samdŭngt'an'gwangsŏn

The Samdŭng T'an'gwang Line, or Samdŭng Colliery Line is a former non-electrified railway line of the Korean State Railway in Kangdong County, P'yŏngyang, North Korea, which ran from Samdŭng on the P'yŏngdŏk Line to Taeri.

== Route ==
A yellow background in the "Distance" box indicates that section of the line is not electrified.

Distance (km)		Station Name		Former Name		
Total	S2S	Transcribed	Chosŏn'gŭl (Hanja)	Transcribed	Chosŏn'gŭl (Hanja)	Connections
0.0	0.0	Samdŭng	삼등 (三登)			P'yŏngdŏk Line
~~4.8~~	~~4.8~~	Taeri	대리 (岱里)			Closed
