= Taehyang Line =

Korean State Railway line

Overview
- Native name: 대향선(大鄕線)
- Status: Operational
- Owner: Korean State Railway
- Locale: North Hamgyŏng
- Termini: Ryonghyŏn; Taehyang
- Stations: 2

Service
- Type: Heavy rail, Freight rail
- Operator: Korean State Railway

Technical
- Line length: 14.9 km (9.3 mi)
- Number of tracks: Single track
- Track gauge: 1,435 mm (4 ft 8 1/2 in) standard gauge
- Electrification: 3000 V DC Catenary

- Taehyang Line
- Hangul: 대향선
- Hanja: 大鄕線
- RR: Daehyangseon
- MR: Taehyangsŏn

The Taehyang Line is an electrified secondary railway line of the Korean State Railway in North Hamgyŏng Province, North Korea, from Ryonghyŏn on the P'yŏngra Line to Taehyang.

There is a line that branches off the Taehyang Line leading to two private (Party-use only) stations.

== Route ==
A yellow background in the "Distance" box indicates that section of the line is not electrified.

Distance (km)		Station Name		Former Name		
Total	S2S	Transcribed	Chosŏn'gŭl (Hanja)	Transcribed	Chosŏn'gŭl (Hanja)	Connections
0.0	0.0	Ryonghyŏn	룡현 (龍峴)			P'yŏngra Line
14.9	14.9	Taehyang	대향 (大鄕)			Distance estimated
