= Tongnam Line =

Railway line in North Korea

Tŏngnam Line

Overview
- Native name: 덕남선 (德南線)
- Status: Operational
- Owner: Korean State Railway
- Locale: Tŏkch'ŏn-si, South P'yŏngan
- Termini: Namdŏkch'ŏn; Tŏngnam
- Stations: 2

Service
- Type: Heavy rail, Freight rail

Technical
- Line length: 1.6 km (0.99 mi)
- Number of tracks: Single track
- Track gauge: 1,435 mm (4 ft 8 1/2 in) standard gauge
- Electrification: 3000 V DC Catenary

- Tongnam Line
- Hangul: 덕남선
- Hanja: 德南線
- RR: Deongnamseon
- MR: Tŏngnamsŏn

The Tŏngnam Line is an electrified railway line of the Korean State Railway in Tŏkch'ŏn-si, South P'yŏngan Province, North Korea, running from South Tŏkch'ŏn on the P'yŏngdŏk Line to Tŏngnam.

== Route ==
| Distance (km) | | Station Name | | Former Name | | |
| Total | S2S | Transcribed | Chosŏn'gŭl (Hanja) | Transcribed | Chosŏn'gŭl (Hanja) | Connections |
|---|---|---|---|---|---|---|
| 0.0 | 0.0 | Namdŏkch'ŏn | 남덕천 (南德川) | | | P'yŏngdŏk Line |
| 1.6 | 1.6 | Tŏngnam | 덕남 (德南) | | | |
