= Kwanha Line =

Railway line in North Korea

Overview
- Native name: 관하선 (官下線)
- Status: Operational
- Owner: Korean State Railway
- Locale: South P'yŏngan
- Termini: Pukch'ang; Kwanha
- Stations: 2

Service
- Type: Heavy rail, Freight rail
- Operator(s): Korean State Railway

Technical
- Line length: 2.6 km (1.6 mi)
- Number of tracks: Single track
- Track gauge: 1,435 mm (4 ft 8 1/2 in) standard gauge

- Kwanha Line
- Hangul: 관하선
- Hanja: 官下線
- RR: Gwanhaseon
- MR: Kwanhasŏn

The Kwanha Line is a non-electrified railway line of the Korean State Railway in South P'yŏngan Province, North Korea, running from Pukch'ang on the P'yŏngdŏk Line to Kwanha.

== Route ==
A yellow background in the "Distance" box indicates that section of the line is not electrified.

Distance (km)		Station Name		Former Name		
Total	S2S	Transcribed	Chosŏn'gŭl (Hanja)	Transcribed	Chosŏn'gŭl (Hanja)	Connections
0.0	0.0	Pukch'ang	북창 (北倉)			P'yŏngdŏk Line, Tŭkchang Line
8.8	8.8	Kwanha	관하 (官下)			
