= Taedonggang station =

Railway station in Pyongyang, North Korea

Taedonggang 대동강

Korean name
- Hangul: 대동강역
- Hanja: 大同江驛
- Revised Romanization: Daedonggang-yeok
- McCune–Reischauer: Taedonggang-yŏk

General information
- Location: P'yŏngyang; North Korea
- Coordinates: 38.986°N 125.754°E
- Owner: Korean State Railway
- Connections: Tram Line 3

History
- Opened: 1 September 1911
- Original company: Chosen Government Railway

Services
Preceding station	Korean State Railway	Following station
P'yŏngyang Terminus	P'yŏngbu Line	Ryŏkp'o towards Kaesŏng
East P'yŏngyang towards Kujang Ch'ŏngnyŏn	P'yŏngdŏk Line	P'yŏngyang Terminus
Location

Taedonggang station is a railway station located in P'yŏngyang, North Korea. It is located on the south bank of the Taedong River at the junction of the P'yŏngbu and P'yŏngdŏk lines.

The Taedonggang Hotel is nearby, and the station is served by Line 3 of the P'yŏngyang tram system.

== History ==
The station was opened by the Chosen Government Railway on 1 September 1911, as part of the P'yŏngyang Colliery Line. During the Korean War, army trains of the South Korean Army operated between Taedonggang and Imjin stations between November and December 1950.
