= Mapyong Line =

Railway line in North Korea

Map'yŏng Line

Overview
- Native name: 마평선 (馬坪線)
- Status: Operational
- Owner: Korean State Railway
- Locale: T'aech'ŏn-gun, North P'yŏngan
- Termini: Yŏnjung; Map'yŏng
- Stations: 3

Service
- Type: Heavy rail, Regional rail, Freight rail
- Operator(s): Korean State Railway

Technical
- Line length: 2.9 km (1.8 mi)
- Number of tracks: Single track
- Track gauge: 1,435 mm (4 ft 8 1/2 in) standard gauge

- Mapyong Line
- Hangul: 마평선
- Hanja: 馬坪線
- RR: Mapyeongseon
- MR: Map'yŏngsŏn

The Map'yŏng Line is a non-electrified railway line of the Korean State Railway in T'aech'ŏn County, North P'yŏngan Province, North Korea, running from P'arwŏn on the Ch'ŏngnyŏn P'arwŏn Line to Hwŏnhwa.

The line formerly continued from Hwŏnhwa to past the site of the T'aech'ŏn nuclear reactor, but that section was abandoned after construction of the reactor was halted in 1994; the line had also continued further on to Map'yŏng to assist with the construction of the large Taech'ŏn No. 2 Hydroelectric Power Station further up the Taeryŏng River.

== Route ==
A yellow background in the "Distance" box indicates that section of the line is not electrified.

Distance (km)		Station Name		Former Name		
Total	S2S	Transcribed	Chosŏn'gŭl (Hanja)	Transcribed	Chosŏn'gŭl (Hanja)	Connections
0.0	0.0	Yŏnjung	연중 (延中)			Ch'ŏngnyŏn P'arwŏn Line
2.9	2.9	Hwŏnhwa	훤화 (萱花)			
11.1	8.2	Map'yŏng	마평 (馬坪)			Closed
