= Maebong station (Unsan County) =

Railway station in North Korea

Maebong 매봉

Korean name
- Hangul: 매봉역
- Revised Romanization: Maebong-yeok
- McCune–Reischauer: Maebong-yŏk

General information
- Location: Ŭnsan-gun, South P'yŏngan; North Korea
- Owner: Korean State Railway
- Line: Pyongra Line

Services
Preceding station	Korean State Railway	Following station
Haksan Terminus	Maebong Line	Terminus

Maebong station is a railway station in Ŭnsan County, South P'yŏngan Province, North Korea. It is the terminus of the Maebong Line of the Korean State Railway.
