= Singye station =

Railway station in North Korea

Sin'gye station

Korean name
- Hangul: 신계역
- Hanja: 新溪驛
- Revised Romanization: Sin-gye-yeok
- McCune–Reischauer: Sin'gye yŏk

General information
- Location: Sin'gye-ŭp, Singye County, North Hwanghae Province; North Korea
- Operator: Korean State Railway
- Line: Chongnyon Ichon Line
Location

Sin'gye station is a railway station for Singye County, North Hwanghae Province, North Korea.
