= Iltan Line =

Railway line in North Korea

Ilt'an Line

Overview
- Native name: 일탄선(日炭線)
- Status: Operational
- Owner: Korean State Railway
- Locale: North Hamgyŏng
- Termini: Rodong; Hwadae
- Stations: 3

Service
- Type: Heavy rail, Freight rail

Technical
- Line length: 12.0 km (7.5 mi)
- Number of tracks: Single track
- Track gauge: 1,435 mm (4 ft 8 1/2 in) standard gauge
- Electrification: 3000 V DC Catenary

- Iltan Line
- Hangul: 일탄선
- Hanja: 日炭線
- RR: Iltanseon
- MR: Ilt'ansŏn

The Ilt'an Line is an electrified 12.0 km (7.5 mi) long railway line of the Korean State Railway in North Hamgyŏng Province, North Korea from Rodong on the P'yŏngra Line to Hwadae. The first 6.5 km (4.0 mi) section, from Rodong to Ilt'an, was opened before 2003, and a 5.5 km (3.4 mi) extension from Ilt'an to Hwadae was opened some time between 2010 and 2013.

== Route ==
A yellow background in the "Distance" box indicates that section of the line is not electrified.

Distance (km)		Station Name		Former Name		
Total	S2S	Transcribed	Chosŏn'gŭl (Hanja)	Transcribed	Chosŏn'gŭl (Hanja)	Connections
0.0	0.0	Rodong	로동 (蘆洞)			P'yŏngra Line
6.5	6.5	Ilt'an	일탄 (日炭)			
12.0	5.5	Hwadae	화대 (花坮)			
