= Maebong Line =

Railway line in North Korea

Overview
- Native name: 매봉선
- Status: Operational
- Owner: Korean State Railway
- Locale: South P'yŏngan
- Termini: Haksan; Maebong
- Stations: 3

Service
- Type: Heavy rail, freight rail
- Operator: Korean State Railway

Technical
- Line length: 4.2 km (2.6 mi)
- Number of tracks: Single track
- Track gauge: 1,435 mm (4 ft 8 1/2 in) standard gauge
- Electrification: 3000 V DC Overhead line

- Maebong Line
- Hangul: 매봉선
- RR: Maebongseon
- MR: Maebongsŏn

The Maebong Line is an electrified standard-gauge freight-only secondary line of the Korean State Railway in South P'yŏngan Province, North Korea, running from Haksan on the Ŭnsan Line to Maebong.

== Route ==
A yellow background in the "Distance" box indicates that section of the line is not electrified.

Distance (km)		Station Name		Former Name		
Total	S2S	Transcribed	Chosŏn'gŭl (Hanja)	Transcribed	Chosŏn'gŭl (Hanja)	Connections
0.0	0.0	Haksan	학산 (鶴山)			Ŭnsan Line
~4.2	~4.2	Maebong	매봉 (-)			
