= Tongrim station =

Railway station in Tongrim County, North Korea

Coordinates: 39°50′3″N 124°49′13″E

Tongrim 동림

Korean name
- Hangul: 동림역
- Hanja: 東林驛
- Revised Romanization: Dongnim-yeok
- McCune–Reischauer: Tongrim-yŏk

General information
- Location: Tongrim-ŭp, Tongrim County, North P'yŏngan Province; North Korea
- Owner: Korean State Railway

History
- Opened: 5 November 1905

Services
Preceding station	Korean State Railway	Following station
Yŏmju towards Dandong (China)	P'yŏngŭi Line	Ch'ŏnggang towards P'yŏngyang
Terminus	Ch'ŏlsan Line	Ch'ŏlsan towards Tongch'angri
Location

Tongrim station is a railway station in Tongrim-ŭp, Tongrim County, North P'yŏngan Province, North Korea. It is on located on the P'yŏngŭi Line of the Korean State Railway. It is also the starting point of the Ch'ŏlsan Line.

== History ==
The station was opened, along with the rest of this section of the Kyŏngŭi Line, on 5 November 1905; it was originally called Ch'aryŏn'gwan station, receiving its current name in July 1945.
