= Tuon Line =

Korean State Railway line

Tuŏn Line

Overview
- Native name: 두언선(豆彦線)
- Status: Operational
- Owner: Korean State Railway
- Locale: South Hamgyŏng
- Termini: Omongri; Yŏhaejin
- Stations: 3

Service
- Type: Heavy rail, Freight rail

Technical
- Line length: 11.9 km (7.4 mi)
- Number of tracks: Single track
- Track gauge: 1,435 mm (4 ft 8 1/2 in) standard gauge
- Electrification: 3000 V DC Catenary

- Tuon Line
- Hangul: 두언선
- Hanja: 豆彦線
- RR: Dueonseon
- MR: Tuŏnsŏn

The Tuŏn Line is an electrified 11.9 km (7.4 mi) long freight-only railway line of the Korean State Railway in Tanch'ŏn, South Hamgyŏng Province, North Korea, running between Omongri on the P'yŏngra Line and Yŏhaejin at the junction of the P'yŏngra and Hambuk Lines. The line serves the large Tanch'ŏn Refinery and the Tanch'ŏn Magnesia Factory at Tuŏn.

== Route ==
A yellow background in the "Distance" box indicates that section of the line is not electrified.

Distance (km)		Station Name		Former Name		
Total	S2S	Transcribed	Chosŏn'gŭl (Hanja)	Transcribed	Chosŏn'gŭl (Hanja)	Connections
0.0	0.0	Omongri	오몽리 (吾夢里)			P'yŏngra Line
4.2	4.2	Tuŏn	두언 (豆彦)			
11.9	7.7	Yŏhaejin	여해진 (汝海津)			P'yŏngra Line, Kŭmgol Line
