= Solgol Tangwang Line =

Railway in South Pyongan, North Korea

Solgol T'an'gwang Line

Overview
- Other name(s): Solgol Colliery Line
- Native name: 솔골탄광선 (솔골炭鑛線)
- Status: Operational
- Owner: Korean State Railway
- Locale: South P'yŏngan
- Termini: Songnam Ch'ŏngnyŏn; Solgol
- Stations: 2

Service
- Type: Heavy rail, Freight rail

History
- Opened: 1970s

Technical
- Line length: 4.4 km (2.7 mi)
- Number of tracks: Single track
- Track gauge: 1,435 mm (4 ft 8 1/2 in) standard gauge
- Electrification: 3000 V DC Catenary

- Solgol Tangwang Line
- Chosŏn'gŭl: 솔골탄광선
- Hancha: 솔골炭鑛線
- Revised Romanization: Solgoltangwangseon
- McCune–Reischauer: Solgolt'an'gwangsŏn

The Solgol T'an'gwang Line, or Solgol Colliery Line, is an electrified railway line of the Korean State Railway in South P'yŏngan Province, North Korea, running from Songnam Ch'ŏngnyŏn Station on the P'yŏngdŏk Line to the Songnam Youth Colliery at Solgol.

== History ==
The line was opened by the Korean State Railway in the 1970s.

== Route ==
A yellow background in the "Distance" box indicates that section of the line is not electrified.

Distance (km)		Station Name		Former Name		
Total	S2S	Transcribed	Chosŏn'gŭl (Hanja)	Transcribed	Chosŏn'gŭl (Hanja)	Connections
0.0	0.0	Songnam Ch'ŏngnyŏn	송남청년 (松南靑年)	Songnam	송남 (松南)	P'yŏngdŏk Line
4.4	4.4	Solgol	솔골 (-)			
