= Toksong Line =

Railway line in North Korea

Overview
- Other name: Pukch'ŏng Line
- Native name: 덕성선 (德城線)
- Status: Operational
- Owner: Chosen Government Railway (1929–1945); Korean State Railway (since 1945)
- Locale: South Hamgyong
- Termini: Sinbukch'ŏng; Sangri
- Stations: 12

Service
- Type: Heavy rail, Regional rail

History
- Opened: 20 September 1929 (Sinbukch'ŏng–Pukch'ŏng); 10 October 1960 (Pukch'ŏng–Sangri)

Technical
- Line length: 51.7 km (32.1 mi)
- Number of tracks: Single track
- Track gauge: 1,435 mm (4 ft 8 1/2 in) standard gauge
Route map
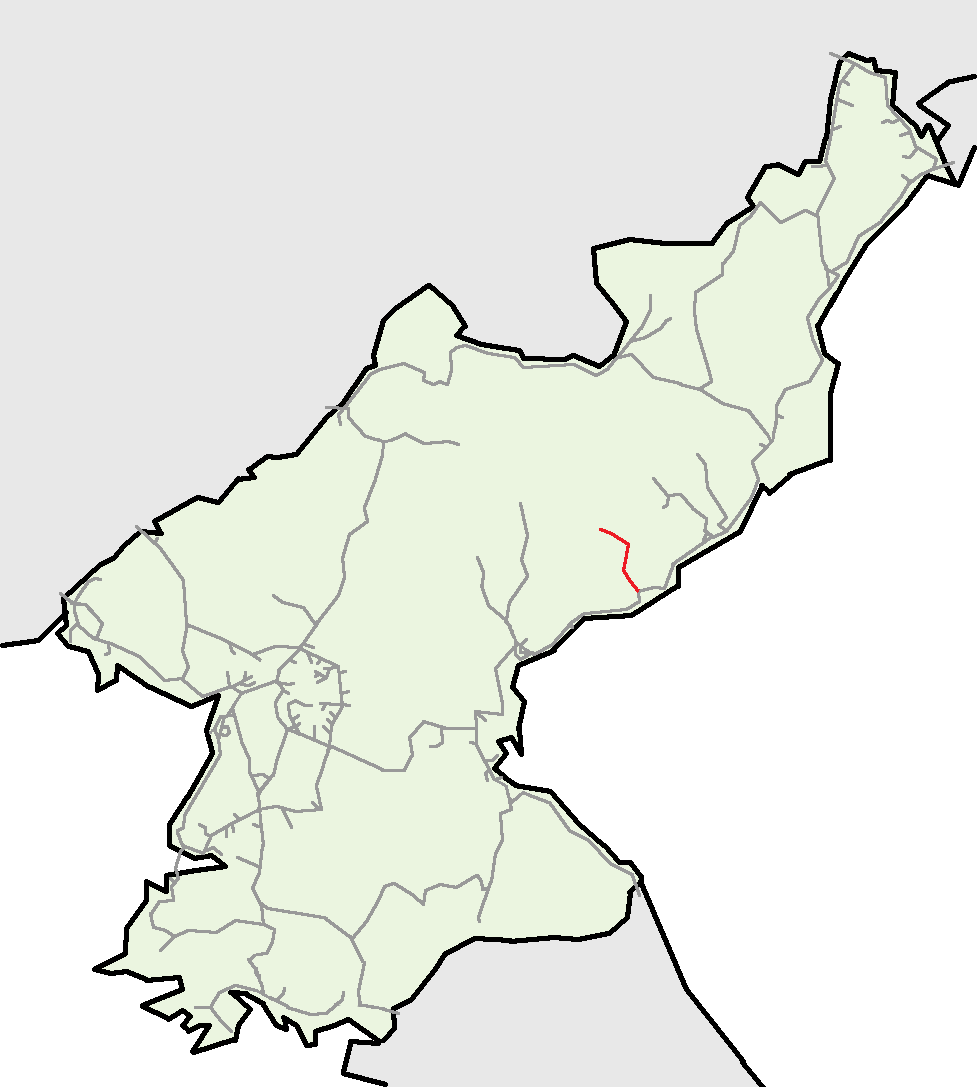

- Toksong Line
- Hangul: 덕성선
- Hanja: 德城線
- RR: Deokseongseon
- MR: Tŏksŏngsŏn

The Tŏksŏng Line is a non-electrified standard-gauge secondary line of the Korean State Railway in South Hamgyŏng Province, North Korea, running from Sinbukch'ŏng on the P'yŏngra Line to Sangri.

== History ==
On 20 September 1929 the Chosen Government Railway opened the Pukch'ŏng Line from Sinbukch'ŏng to Pukch'ŏng. In the 1940s an extension of the railway had been planned, but the construction was stopped because of the defeat of Japan in the Pacific War. The planned extension, from Pukch'ŏng to Sangri, was completed by the Korean State Railway and opened on 6 October 1960, and given its current name.

== Services ==
Two passenger trains are known to operate on this line:

- Regional trains 261/262, operating between Hamhŭng and Samgi, run on this line between Sinbukch'ŏng and Samgi;
- Local trains 866/867 operate on the entirety of this line between Sinbukch'ŏng and Sangri.

== Route ==
A yellow background in the "Distance" box indicates that section of the line is not electrified.

| Distance (km) | | Station Name | | Former Name | | |
| Total | S2S | Transcribed | Chosŏn'gŭl (Hanja) | Transcribed | Chosŏn'gŭl (Hanja) | Connections |
|---|---|---|---|---|---|---|
| 0.0 | 0.0 | Sinbukch'ŏng | 신북청 (新北靑) | | | P'yŏngra Line |
| 4.4 | 4.4 | Ryangga | 량가 (良家) | | | |
| 9.4 | 5.0 | Pukch'ŏng | 북청 (北靑) | | | |
| 14.4 | 5.0 | Rahadae | 라하대 (羅下坮) | | | Flag stop. |
| 19.0 | 4.6 | Tŏksŏng | 덕성 (德城) | | | |
| 23.0 | 4.0 | Chuŭidong | 주의동 (主義洞) | | | Flag stop. |
| 25.8 | 2.8 | Yangsŭng | 양승 (陽勝) | | | Flag stop. |
| 30.2 | 4.4 | Top'yŏng | 도평 (島坪) | | | |
| 35.3 | 5.1 | Samgi | 삼기 (三岐) | | | |
| 43.2 | 7.9 | Songjung | 송중 (松中) | | | |
| 47.7 | 4.5 | Sang'il | 상일 (上一) | | | Flag stop. |
| 51.7 | 4.0 | Sangri | 상리 (上里) | | | |
