= Sinsongchon station =

Railway station in North Korea

Coordinates: 39.3467°N 126.2457°E

Sinsŏngch'ŏn 신성천

Korean name
- Hangul: 신성천역
- Hanja: 新成川驛
- Revised Romanization: Sinseongcheon-nyeok
- McCune–Reischauer: Sinsŏngch'ŏn-nyŏk

General information
- Location: Sinsŏngch'ŏn-rodongjagu, Sŏngch'ŏn-gun, South P'yŏngan; North Korea
- Owner: Korean State Railway

History
- Opened: 1 October 1931
- Original company: Chosen Government Railway

Services
Preceding station	Korean State Railway	Following station
Kŭmp'yŏng towards Kujang Ch'ŏngnyŏn	P'yŏngdŏk Line	Samdŏk towards P'yŏngyang
Sudŏk towards P'yŏngyang	P'yŏngra Line	Kŏhŭng towards Rajin
Location

Sinsŏngch'ŏn station is a railway station located in Sinsŏngch'ŏn-rodongjagu, Sŏngch'ŏn County, South P'yŏngan Province, North Korea, on the P'yŏngra Line of the Korean State Railway; it is also the starting point of the P'yŏngdŏk Line.

== History ==
The station was opened by the Chosen Government Railway on 1 October 1931, as part of the fourth section of the P'yŏngwŏn Line; it became part of the P'yŏngra Line after the establishment of the DPRK.
