= Cholsan Line =

Railway line in North Korea

Ch'ŏlsan Line

Overview
- Other name: Tongch'ŏn Line
- Native name: 철산선 (鐵山線)
- Status: Operational
- Owner: Chosen Government Railway (before 1945); Korean State Railway (since 1945)
- Locale: North P'yŏngan
- Termini: Tongrim; Tongchangri
- Stations: 3

Service
- Type: Heavy rail, Passenger & freight rail Regional rail

History
- Opened: before 1937 (Tongrim–Ch'ŏlsan); 2010 (Ch'ŏlsan–Tongch'angri)

Technical
- Line length: 26.9 km (16.7 mi)
- Number of tracks: Single track
- Track gauge: 1,435 mm (4 ft 8 1/2 in) standard gauge

- Cholsan Line
- Hangul: 철산선
- Hanja: 鐵山線
- RR: Cheolsanseon
- MR: Ch'ŏlsansŏn

The Ch'ŏlsan Line is a non-electrified standard-gauge freight-only secondary line of the Korean State Railway in North P'yŏngan Province, North Korea, running from Tongrim on the P'yŏngŭi Line to Tongch'angri, where it serves the Sŏhae Satellite Launching Station.

== History ==
The Ch'ŏlsan Line was originally opened as the Tongch'ŏn Line by the Chosen Government Railway prior to 1937, running 12.5 km (7.8 mi) from Ch'aryŏngwan (nowadays called Tongrim) on the Kyŏngui Line to Tongch'ŏn (now called Ch'ŏlsan). To facilitate the construction of the Sŏhae Satellite Launching Station, the line was extended around 2010 to the launch facility via Tongch'ang.

== Route ==
A yellow background in the "Distance" box indicates that section of the line is not electrified.

| Distance (km) | | Station Name | | Former Name | | |
| Total | S2S | Transcribed | Chosŏn'gŭl (Hanja) | Transcribed | Chosŏn'gŭl (Hanja) | Connections |
|---|---|---|---|---|---|---|
| 0.0 | 0.0 | Tongrim | 동림 (東林) | Ch'aryŏngwan | 차련관 (車輦館) | P'yŏngŭi Line |
| 12.5 | 12.5 | Ch'ŏlsan | 철산 (鐵山) | Tongch'ŏn | 동천 (東川) | |
| 26.9 | 14.4 | Tongch'angri | 동창리 (東倉里) | | | Sŏhae Satellite Launching Station 서해위성발사장/西海衛星發射場 |
