= Railway lines in North Korea =

North Korea has a railway system consisting of an extensive network of standard-gauge lines and a smaller network of 762 mm (30.0 in) narrow-gauge lines; the latter are to be found around the country, but the most important lines are in the northern part of the country. All railways in North Korea are operated by the state-owned Korean State Railway.

Lines whose names are in italics are closed.

== Standard gauge ==
Trunk lines

- Hambuk Line: Ch'ŏngjin Ch'ŏngnyŏn (P'yŏngra Line) – Rajin (P'yŏngra Line), 328.2 km (203.9 mi) (Rajin–Hongŭi dual gauge standard (1,435 mm (4 ft 8 1/2 in)) and Russian (1,520 mm (4 ft 11 27/32 in)))
  - Hoeryŏng Colliery Line: Hoeryŏng (km 89.5 Hambuk Line) – Yusŏn, 10.6 km (6.6 mi)
  - Sech'ŏn Line: Sinhakp'o (km 104.3 Hambuk Line) – Chungbong, 14.4 km (8.9 mi)
  - Tongp'o Line: Chongsŏng (km 139.0 Hambuk Line) – Tongp'o, 15.6 km (9.7 mi)
  - Sŏngp'yŏng Line: Kangalli (km 147.2 Hambuk Line) - Sŏngp'yŏng, 11.5 km (7.1 mi) (closed)
  - Namyanggukkyŏng Line: Namyang (km 165.9 Hambuk Line) – Gukkyŏng (→ Tumen, China), 3.3 km (2.1 mi) (to Tumen)
  - Kogŏnwŏn Line: Singŏn (km 234.3 Hambuk Line) – Kogŏnwŏn, 9.8 km (6.1 mi)
  - Ch'undu Line: Songhak (km 255.0 Hambuk Line) - Ch'undu
  - Hoeam Line: Haksong (km 258.1 Hambuk line) – Obong, 10.4 km (6.5 mi)
  - Hongŭi Line: Hongŭi (km 285.6 Hambuk Line) – Tumangang (→ Khasan, Russia), 9.5 km (5.9 mi), dual gauge standard (1,435 mm (4 ft 8 1/2 in)) and Russian (1,520 mm (4 ft 11 27/32 in))
  - Sŭngri Line: Sŏnbong (km 309.9 Hambuk Line) – Sŭngri, 4.2 km (2.6 mi)
- Kangwŏn Line: Kowŏn (P'yŏngra Line) – P'yŏnggang, 145.8 km (90.6 mi)
  - Ch'ŏnnae Line: Ryongdam (km 12.1 Kangwŏn Line) – Ch'ŏnnae, 4.4 km (2.7 mi)
  - Munch'ŏnhang Line: Okp'yŏng (km 22.0 Kangwŏn Line) – Koam, 7.4 km (4.6 mi)
  - Songdowŏn Line: Segil (km 36.5 Kangwŏn Line) – Songdowŏn, est. 2.7 km (1.7 mi)
  - Wŏnsanhang Line: Kalma (km 46.1 Kangwŏn Line) – Wŏnsanhang, 2.0 km (1.2 mi)
  - Kŭmgangsan Line: Ch'ŏrwŏn (km 167.6 Kangwŏn Line) – Ch'angdo, 67.6 km (42.0 mi) (closed)
- Kŭmgangsan Ch'ŏngnyŏn Line: Anbyŏn (Kangwŏn Line) – Kŭmgangsan Ch'ŏngnyŏn – Kamho (→ Chejin, ROK), 114.8 km (71.3 mi) (to Kamho)
- Manp'o Line: Sunch'ŏn (P'yŏngra Line) – Manp'o Ch'ŏngnyŏn (Pukpu Line) (→ Ji'an, China, 299.8 km (186.3 mi) (to Manp'o)
  - Taegak Line: Ch'ŏndong (km 32.6 Manp'o Line) – Taegak, 8.2 km (5.1 mi)
  - Choyang Colliery Line: Kaech'ŏn (km 38.9 Manp'o Line) – Choyang Colliery, 22.1 km (13.7 mi)
  - Chunhyŏk Line: Kaech'ŏn (km 38.9 Manp'o Line) – Chunhyŏngri, 6.6 km (4.1 mi)
  - Pongch'ŏn Colliery Line: Pongch'ŏn (km 49.9 Manp'o Line) – Pongch'ŏn Colliery, 2.0 km (1.2 mi)
  - Kaech'ŏn Colliery Line: Chajak (km 54.0 Manp'o Line) – Chŏnjin, 4.2 km (2.6 mi)
  - Ryong'am Line: Kujang Ch'ŏngnyŏn (km 63.0 Manp'o Line) – Ryong'am, 7.4 km (4.6 mi)
  - Ryongmun Colliery Line: Ŏryong (km 68.5 Manp'o Line) – Ryongmun Colliery, 7.1 km (4.4 mi)
  - Ch'up'yŏng Line: Hŭich'ŏn Ch'ŏngnyŏn (km 109.8 Manp'o Line) – P'ungsan-dong, 4.6 km (2.9 mi)
  - Unha Line: Manp'o Ch'ŏngnyŏn (Pukpu Line) (km 299.8 Manp'o Line) – Unha, 6.5 km (4.0 mi)
- Paektusan Ch'ŏngnyŏn Line: Kilju Ch'ŏngnyŏn (P'yŏngra Line) – Hyesan Ch'ŏngnyŏn (Paengmu Line), 141.7 km (88.0 mi)
  - Osich'ŏn Line: Taeoch'ŏn (km 124.6 Paektusan Ch'ŏngnyŏn Line) – Osich'ŏn, est. 10.0 km (6.2 mi) (closed)
  - Samjiyŏn Line: Wiyŏn Ch'ŏngnyŏn (km 137.1 Paektusan Ch'ŏngnyŏn Line) – Motka, 64.0 km (39.8 mi)
- P'yŏngbu Line: P'yŏngyang (P'yŏngnam & P'yŏngŭi Lines) – Kaesŏng – P'anmun (→ Torasan, ROK), 197.6 km (122.8 mi) (to P'anmun)
  - Rangrang Line: Ryŏkp'o (km 10.5 P'yŏngbu Line) – Rangrang Station, 10.2 km (6.3 mi)
  - Songrim Line: Hwangju (km 36.5 P'yŏngbu Line) – Songrim Hwamul, 14.2 km (8.8 mi)
  - Pongsan Line: Pongsan (km 70.5 P'yŏngbu Line) – West Pongsan, 2.5 km (1.6 mi)
- P'yŏngdŏk Line: Taedonggang (P'yŏngyang; P'yŏngbu Line) – Kujang Ch'ŏngnyŏn (Manp'o & Ch'ŏngnyŏn P'arwŏn Lines), 192.3 km (119.5 mi)
  - Myŏngdang Line: Ch'ŏngryong (km 16.7 P'yŏngdŏk Line) – Myŏngdang, 19.2 km (11.9 mi)
  - Kobi Line: Ripsŏngri (km 18.5 P'yŏngdŏk Line) – Kobi, 14.5 km (9.0 mi)
  - Tŏksan Line: Songga (km 39.2 P'yŏngdŏk Line) – Tŏksan, 1.7 km (1.1 mi) (closed)
  - Samdŭng Colliery Line: Samdŭng (km 45.7 P'yŏngdŏk Line) – Taeri, 4.8 km (3.0 mi) (closed)
  - Ryŏngdae Line: Wŏnch'ang (km 105.0 P'yŏngdŏk Line) – Ryŏngdae, 7.1 km (4.4 mi)
  - Chaedong Line: Kujŏng (km 108.6 P'yŏngdŏk Line) – Chaedong, 4.4 km (2.7 mi)
  - Solgol Colliery Line: Songnam Ch'ŏngnyŏn (km 111.1 P'yŏngdŏk Line) – Solgol, 4.4 km (2.7 mi)
  - Kwanha Line: Pukch'ang (km 128.0 P'yŏngdŏk Line) – Kwanha, 2.6 km (1.6 mi)
  - Tŭkchang Line: Pukch'ang (km 128.0 P'yŏngdŏk Line) – Sŏksan, 17.7 km (11.0 mi)
    - Myŏnghak Line: Tŭkchang (km 15.0 Tŭkchang Line) – Myŏnghak, 2.6 km (1.6 mi)
  - Ingp'o Line: Kuhyŏng (km 136.3 P'yŏngdŏk Line) – Ingp'o, 8.8 km (5.5 mi)
  - Tŏngnam Line: South Tŏkch'ŏn (km 152.8 P'yŏngdŏk Line) – Tŏngnam, 1.6 km (0.99 mi)
  - Sŏch'ang Line: Tŏkch'ŏn (km 154.8 P'yŏngdŏk Line) – Sŏch'ang, 11.6 km (7.2 mi)
    - Sinsŏng Line: West Tŏkch'ŏn (km 3.6 Sŏch'ang Line) – Sinsŏng, 4.0 km (2.5 mi)
    - Hoedun Line: Ch'ŏlgisan (km 8.7 Sŏch'ang Line) – Hoedun, 5.6 km (3.5 mi)
    - Hyŏngbong Line: Ch'ŏlgisan (km 8.7 Sŏch'ang Line) – Hyŏngbong, 4.2 km (2.6 mi)
  - Changsang Line: Hyangjang, (km 165.2 P'yŏngdŏk Line) – Changsang, 1.9 km (1.2 mi)
- P'yŏngnam Line: P'yŏngyang (P'yŏngbu & P'yŏngŭi Lines) – Sinnamp'o – P'yŏngnam Onch'ŏn (Namdong Line), 89.3 km (55.5 mi)
  - Pyongyanghwajon Line: Pot'onggang (km 3.9 P'yŏngnam Line) – P'yŏngch'ŏn, 3.7 km (2.3 mi)
  - Chamjilli Line: Kangsŏn (km 23.1 P'yŏngnam Line) – Chamjilli
  - Posan Line: Kangsŏ (km 28.3 P'yŏngnam line) – Posan, 5.0 km (3.1 mi)
  - Tae'an Line: Kangsŏ (km 28.3 P'yŏngnam line) – Tae'an Hwamul, 11.7 km (7.3 mi)
  - Ryonggang Line: Ryonggang (km 40.7 P'yŏngnam Line) – Mayŏng, 18.3 km (11.4 mi)
    - Husan Line: Husan (km 10.9 Ryonggang Line) – Yangmak, 3.7 km (2.3 mi)
  - Namp'ohang Line: Sinnamp'o (km 54.9 P'yŏngnam Line) – Namp'ohang, est. 8.8 km (5.5 mi)
  - Tojiri Line: Namp'o (km 55.2 P'yŏngnam Line) – Tojiri, 9.9 km (6.2 mi)
  - Namdong Line: P'yŏngnam Onch'ŏn (km 89.3 P'yŏngnam Line) – Namdong (Sŏhae Line), est. 73.5 km (45.7 mi) (closed)
- P'yŏngra Line: Kalli (P'yŏngyang; P'yŏngŭi Line) – Rajin (Hambuk Line), 782.8 km (486.4 mi)
  - Ponghak Line: Ponghak (km 31.3 P'yŏngra Line) – Songudong, 1.2 km (0.75 mi)
  - Taegŏn Line: Sillyŏnp'o (km 50.8 P'yŏngra Line) – Pongch'ang, 34.5 km (21.4 mi)
    - Chiktong Colliery Line: Taegŏn (km 2.1 Taegŏn Line) – Chiktong T'an'gwang, 8.5 km (5.3 mi)
  - Changsŏn'gang Line: Ŭnsan (km 56.8 P'yŏngra Line) – Changsŏn'gang, est. 3.0 km (1.9 mi)
  - Ŭnsan Line: Ŭnsan (P'yŏngra Line) – Pongch'ang, 34.5 km (21.4 mi)
    - Maebong Line: Haksan (km 2.5 Ŭnsan Line) - Maebong, est. 4.2 km (2.6 mi)
    - Mohak Line: Taegŏn (km 5.8 Ŭnsan Line) - Mohak - 2.6 km (1.6 mi)
  - Ch'ŏnsŏng Colliery Line: Sinch'ang (km 67.0 P'yŏngra Line) – Ch'ŏnsŏng, 9.2 km (5.7 mi)
  - Kowŏn Colliery Line: Tunjŏn (km 186.3 P'yŏngra Line) – Changdong, 17.6 km (10.9 mi)
  - Kŭmya Line: Kŭmya (km 225.0 P'yŏngra Line) – P'ungnam, 8.7 km (5.4 mi)
  - Pinallon Line: Hamhŭng Choch'ajang (km 298.4 P'yŏngra Line) – Hŭngnam, 14.1 km (8.8 mi)
  - Ch'anghŭng Line: Ch'anghŭng (km 303.3 P'yŏngra Line) – Ryŏnhŭng, 8.3 km (5.2 mi)
  - Tŏksŏng Line: Sinbukch'ŏng (km 411.9 P'yŏngra Line) – Sangri, 51.7 km (32.1 mi)
  - Tuŏn Line: Omongri (km 478.4 P'yŏngra Line) – Tuŏn, 4.2 km (2.6 mi)
  - Kŭmgol Line: Yŏhaejin (km 491.7 P'yŏngra line) – Muhak, 83.4 km (51.8 mi)
  - Ilt'an Line: Rodong (km 562.2 P'yŏngra line) – Iltan, 12.0 km (7.5 mi)
  - Koch'am Colliery Line: Myŏngch'ŏn (km 585.5 P'yŏngra line) – Sinmyŏngch'ŏn, 4.3 km (2.7 mi)
  - Taehyang Line: Ryonghyŏn (km 660.3 P'yŏngra line) – Taehyang, 14.9 km (9.3 mi)
  - Kangdŏk Line: South Kangdŏk (km 694.4 P'yŏngra Line) – Susŏng (Hambuk Line), 15.2 km (9.4 mi)
  - Ch'ŏngjinhang Line: Ch'ŏngjin Ch'ŏngnyŏn (km 701.6 P'yŏngra Line) – Ch'ŏngjinhang, 2.0 km (1.2 mi)
  - Rajinhang Line: Rajin (km 782.8 P'yŏngra Line) – Rajinhang, 3.0 km (1.9 mi)
- P'yŏngŭi Line: P'yŏngyang (P'yŏngbu & P'yŏngnam Lines) – Sinŭiju Ch'ŏngnyŏn (→ Dandong, China), 225.1 km (139.9 mi)
  - Sijŏng Line: Kalli (km 19.1 P'yŏngŭi Line) – Sijŏng, 8.0 km (5.0 mi)
  - Kubongsan Line: Ch'ŏngch'ŏn'gang (km 79.7 P'yŏngŭi Line) – East Namhŭng, est. 12.2 km (7.6 mi)
    - Ch'ŏnghwaryŏk Line: Kubongsan (km 8.5 Kubongsan Line) – Ch'ŏnghwaryŏk, est. 2.5 km (1.6 mi)
  - Namhŭng Line: Maengjungri (km 81.7 P'yŏngŭi Line) – Namhŭng, est. 6.7 km (4.2 mi)
  - Pakch'ŏn Line: Maengjungri (km 81.7 P'yŏngŭi Line) – Pakch'ŏn, 9.3 km (5.8 mi) (closed)
  - Ch'ŏlsan Line: Tongrim (km 177.8 P'yŏngŭi Line) – Tongch'angri, 26.9 km (16.7 mi)
  - Paengma Line: Yŏmju (P'yŏngŭi line) – South Sinŭiju (P'yŏngŭi & Tŏkhyŏn Lines), 39.6 km (24.6 mi)
  - Tasado Line: Ryŏngch'ŏn (km 209.8 P'yŏngŭi Line) – Tasado Port, 24.1 km (15.0 mi)
  - Tŏkhyŏn Line: South Sinŭiju (km 219.9 P'yŏngŭi Line) – Tŏkhyŏn, 37.3 km (23.2 mi)
  - Kang'an Line: Sinŭiju Ch'ŏngnyŏn (km 225.1 P'yŏngŭi Line) – Kang'an, 1.8 km (1.1 mi)

Secondary trunk lines

- Ch'ŏngnyŏn Ich'ŏn Line: P'yŏngsan (P'yŏngbu Line) – Sep'o (Kangwŏn Line), 142.0 km (88.2 mi)
- Hŏch'ŏn Line: Tanch'ŏn Ch'ŏngnyŏn (P'yŏngra Line) – Honggun, 80.3 km (49.9 mi)
  - Mandŏk Line: Hŏch'ŏn (km 54.7 Hŏch'ŏn Line) – Mandŏk, 10.3 km (6.4 mi)
- Hwanghae Ch'ŏngnyŏn Line: Sariwŏn Ch'ŏngnyŏn (P'yŏngbu Line) – Haeju Ch'ŏngnyon (Ongjin Line), 73.3 km (45.5 mi)
- Paech'ŏn Line: Changbang (km 75.6 Hwanghae Ch'ŏngnyŏn Line) – Ŭnbit, 64.4 km (40.0 mi)
  - Tŏktal Line: Ch'ŏngdan (km 20.5 Paech'ŏn Line) – Tŏktal, est. 12.0 km (7.5 mi) (closed)
- Ongjin Line: Haeju Ch'ŏngnyŏn (km 77.9 Hwanghae Ch'ŏngnyŏn line) – Ongjin, 40.4 km (25.1 mi)
  - Pup'o Line: Sin'gangryŏng (km 31.1 Ongjin Line) – Pup'o, 19.1 km (11.9 mi)
  - Chŏngdo Line: Wangsin (km xx Ongjin Line) – Chŏngdo, 0.7 km (0.43 mi)
- Kaech'ŏn Line: Sinanju Ch'ŏngnyŏn (P'yŏngŭi Line) – Kaech'ŏn (Manp'o line), 29.5 km (18.3 mi)
- Musan Line: Komusan (Hambuk Line) – Musan (Paengmu Line), 57.9 km (36.0 mi)
  - Musan Mining Line: Ch'ŏlsong Ch'ŏngnyŏn (km 50.5 Musan Line) – Musan Kwangsan, 3.0 km (1.9 mi)
- Ch'ŏngnyŏn P'arwŏn Line: Kujang Ch'ŏngnyŏn (Manp'o & P'yŏngdŏk Lines) – Kusŏng (P'yŏngbuk line), 94.0 km (58.4 mi)
  - Pun'gang Line: P'arwŏn (km 40.1 Ch'ŏngnyŏn P'arwŏn Line) – Pun'gang, 7.2 km (4.5 mi)
  - Map'yŏng Line: Yŏnjung (km 59.8 Ch'ŏngnyŏn P'arwŏn Line) – Map'yŏng, 2.9 km (1.8 mi)
- Pukbunaeryuk Line: Manp'o Ch'ŏngnyŏn (Manp'o Line) – Hyesan Ch'ŏngnyŏn (Paektusan Ch'ŏngnyŏn Line), 249.2 km (154.8 mi)
  - An'gol Line: Mun'ak (km 8.3 Pukpu Line) – An'gol, 2.9 km (1.8 mi)
  - Unbong Line: Sangp'unggang (km 44.9 Pukpu Line) – Kuunbong, 3.4 km (2.1 mi)
- P'yŏngbuk Line: Chŏngju Ch'ŏngnyŏn (P'yŏngŭi Line) – Ch'ŏngsu, 120.5 km (74.9 mi)
  - Taegwalli Line: Sinon (km 78.2 P'yŏngbuk Line) – Taegwalli, 5.4 km (3.4 mi)
  - Amrokkang Line: Pu'pung (km 113.7 P'yŏngbuk Line) – Amrokkang, 4.1 km (2.5 mi)
  - Sup'ung Line: Pu'pung (km 113.7 P'yŏngbuk Line) – Sup'ung, 2.5 km (1.6 mi)
- Riwŏn Line: Riwŏn Ch'ŏlsan – Ch'aho via P'yŏngra Line, 11.2 km (7.0 mi)
- Ryongsŏng Line: Sŏp'o (P'yŏngŭi Line) – Tongbungri (P'yŏngra Line), 15.3 km (9.5 mi)
- Sinhŭng Line: Hamhŭng (P'yŏngra Line) – Sinhŭng (→ Sinhŭng Line narrow-gauge), 41.0 km (25.5 mi)
- Sŏhae Line (Anju Colliery Line): Mundŏk (P'yŏngŭi Line) – Sŏsi; Namdong (Namdong Line), 25.3 km (15.7 mi)
  - Ch'ŏngnam Line: Ch'ŏngnam (Sŏhae Line) - Sŏsi, est. 8.3 km (5.2 mi)
- Sŏhae Kammun Line: Ch'ŏlgwang (Ŭnnyul line) – Sillyŏngri (P'yŏngnam line), 26.7 km (16.6 mi)
- Ŭnnyul Line: Ŭnp'a (Hwanghae Ch'ŏngnyŏn Line) – Ch'ŏlgwang (Sŏhae Kammun Line), 117.8 km (73.2 mi)
  - Changyŏn Line: Sugyo (km 50.5 Ŭnnyul Line) – Changyŏn, 17.7 km (11.0 mi)

== Narrow-gauge lines ==
This is an exhaustive list of all known narrow-gauge lines (762 mm (2 ft 6 in)).

- Changjin Line: Yŏnggwang (Sinhŭng Line standard-gauge) – Sasu, 58.6 km (36.4 mi)
- Kanggye Line: Kanggye (Manp'o Line) – Rangrim, 56.8 km (35.3 mi)
- Paengmu Line: Paeg'am Ch'ŏngnyŏn (Paektusan Ch'ŏngnyŏn Line) – Musan (Musan Line), 191.7 km (119.1 mi)
- Poch'ŏn Line (Paektusan Rimch'ŏl Line): Karim (Samjiyŏn Line) – Ryanggang Taep'yŏng, 31.5 km (19.6 mi) (closed)
- Samjiyŏn Line: Wiyŏn Ch'ŏngnyŏn (Paektusan Ch'ŏngnyŏn Line) – Motka, 81.8 km (50.8 mi) (closed)
- Sinhŭng Line: Sinhŭng (Sinhŭng Line standard-gauge) – Pujŏnhoban, 50.6 km (31.4 mi)
- Sŏhaeri Line: Ch'ŏlgwang (Ŭnnyul Line) – Ryongjŏng, 10.0 km (6.2 mi) (closed)
- Sŏho Line: West Hamhŭng – Sŏho (P'yŏngra Line), 17.6 km (10.9 mi)
- Unsan Line: Puksinhyŏn (Manp'o Line) – Samsan, est. 45.0 km (28.0 mi) (closed)
