= Choyang Tangwang station =

Railway station in North Korea

Choyang Colliery 조양탄광

Korean name
- Hangul: 조양탄광역
- Hanja: 朝陽炭鑛驛
- Revised Romanization: Joyangtangwang-yeok
- McCune–Reischauer: Choyangt'an'gwang-yŏk

General information
- Location: Choyang-dong, Kaech'ŏn-si, South P'yŏngan Province; North Korea
- Coordinates: 39.73092°N 126.08197°E
- Owner: Korean State Railway
- Line: Manp'o Line

History
- Opened: 13 May 1916
- Original company: Mitsui Mining Railway (to 1927); Kaech'ŏn Light Railway (to 1932); Chosen Government Railway

Services
Preceding station	Korean State Railway	Following station
Sŏkkan towards Kaech'ŏn	Choyang Colliery Line	Terminus
Location

Choyang T'an'gwang station (Choyang Colliery station) is a railway station in Choyang-dong, Kaech'ŏn municipal city, South P'yŏngan province, North Korea. It is the terminus of the Choyang Colliery Line of the Korean State Railway.

== History ==
The station was opened on 13 May 1916 by the Mitsui Mining Railway, which became the Kaech'ŏn Light Railway in 1927; the Kaech'ŏn Light Railway was subsequently taken over by the Chosen Government Railway on 1 November 1932.
