= 봉천역 =

봉천역 may refer to stations:

- Bongcheon station (奉天驛), railway station on the Seoul Subway Line 2
- Pongchon station (鳳泉驛), railway station on the Manpo Line and Pongchon Tangwang Line of the Korean State Railway
