= Chajak station =

Railway station in North Korea

Chajak 자작

Korean name
- Hangul: 자작역
- Hanja: 自作驛
- Revised Romanization: Jajag-yeok
- McCune–Reischauer: Chajak-yŏk

General information
- Location: Chajak-tong, Kaech'ŏn-si, South P'yŏngan Province; North Korea
- Coordinates: 39.8134°N 125.9675°E
- Owner: Korean State Railway
- Lines: Manp'o Line; Kaech'ŏn Colliery Line

History
- Opened: 15 October 1933
- Original company: Chosen Government Railway

Services
Preceding station	Korean State Railway	Following station
Ramjŏn towards Manp'o Ch'ŏngnyŏn	Manp'o Line	Pongch'ŏn towards Sunch'ŏn
Terminus	Kaech'ŏn Colliery Line	Chŏnjin Terminus
Location
- Location within North Korea

Chajak station is a railway station in Chajak-tong, Kaech'ŏn municipal city, South P'yŏngan province, North Korea on the Manp'o Line of the Korean State Railway; it is also the starting point of the Kaech'ŏn Colliery Line to Chŏnjin.

== History ==
The station was opened on 15 October 1933 by the Chosen Government Railway, along with the rest of the third section of the Manp'o Line from Kaech'ŏn to Kujang.
