= Taegak station =

Railway station in North Korea

Taegak 대각

Korean name
- Hangul: 대각역
- Hanja: 大角驛
- Revised Romanization: Daegak-yeok
- McCune–Reischauer: Taegak-yŏk

General information
- Location: Taegang-ri, Kaech'ŏn-si, South P'yŏngan Province; North Korea
- Owner: Korean State Railway
- Line: Manp'o Line

Services
Preceding station	Korean State Railway	Following station
Ch'ŏndong Terminus	Taegak Line	Terminus
Location

Taegak station is a railway station in Taegang-ri, Kaech'ŏn municipal city, South P'yŏngan Province, North Korea. It is the terminus of the Taegak Line of the Korean State Railway.
