= Pongchon station =

Railway station in North Korea

Pongch'ŏn 봉천

Korean name
- Hangul: 봉천역
- Hanja: 鳳泉驛
- Revised Romanization: Bongcheon-yeok
- McCune–Reischauer: Pongch'ŏn-yŏk

General information
- Location: Pongch'ŏn-dong, Kaech'ŏn-si, South P'yŏngan Province; North Korea
- Coordinates: 39.7835°N 125.9424°E
- Owner: Korean State Railway
- Line: Manp'o Line

History
- Opened: 15 October 1933
- Original company: Chosen Government Railway

Services
Preceding station	Korean State Railway	Following station
Chajak towards Manp'o Ch'ŏngnyŏn	Manp'o Line	Wŏlli towards Sunch'ŏn
Terminus	Pongch'ŏn Colliery Line	Pongch'ŏn T'an'gwang Terminus
Location

Pongch'ŏn station is a railway station in Pongch'ŏn-dong, Kaech'ŏn municipal city, South P'yŏngan province, North Korea on the Manp'o Line of the Korean State Railway; it is also the starting point of the Pongch'ŏn Colliery Line to Pongch'ŏn Colliery.

== History ==
The station was opened on 15 October 1933 by the Chosen Government Railway, along with the rest of the third section of the Manp'o Line from Kaech'ŏn to Kujang.
