= Martyrs' Cemetery (disambiguation) =

Martyrs' Cemetery is a cemetery in Fallujah, Iraq.

Martyrs' Cemetery or variation may also refer to:

- Martyrs' Cemetery, Korçë, Albania
- National Martyrs' Cemetery of Albania
- Aviation Martyrs' Cemetery, China
- Babaoshan Revolutionary Cemetery, China
- Cemetery for Martyrs of the Chinese People's Volunteers, North Korea
- Chinese People's Volunteer Army Martyrs' Cemetery, North Korea
- Patriotic Martyrs' Cemetery, North Korea
- Revolutionary Martyrs' Cemetery, North Korea
- Martyrs' Cemetery, Kobanî, Syria
- Edirnekapı Martyr's Cemetery, Turkey
- Trường Sơn Cemetery, also known as Trường Sơn Martyrs' Cemetery, Vietnam
