= Pongchon Tangwang station =

Railway station in North Korea

Pongch'ŏn Colliery 봉천탄광

Korean name
- Hangul: 봉천탄광역
- Hanja: 鳳泉炭鑛驛
- Revised Romanization: Bongcheontangwang-yeok
- McCune–Reischauer: Pongch'ŏnt'an'gwang-yŏk

General information
- Location: Pongch'ŏn-dong, Kaech'ŏn-si, South P'yŏngan Province; North Korea
- Coordinates: 39.7754°N 125.9575°E
- Owner: Korean State Railway
- Line: Manp'o Line

History
- Opened: 15 October 1933
- Original company: Chosen Government Railway

Services
Preceding station	Korean State Railway	Following station
Pongch'ŏn Terminus	Pongch'ŏn Colliery Line	Terminus
Location

Pongch'ŏn T'an'gwang station (Pongch'ŏn Colliery station) is a railway station in Pongch'ŏn-dong, Kaech'ŏn municipal city, South P'yŏngan province, North Korea. It is the terminus of the Pongch'ŏn Colliery Line of the Korean State Railway, serving a major anthracite mine.

== History ==
The station was opened on 15 October 1933 by the Chosen Government Railway, along with the rest of the third section of the Manp'o Line from Kaech'ŏn to Kujang.
