= Kaechon Tangwang Line =

Railway line in North Korea

Kaech'ŏn Colliery Line

Overview
- Other name: Kaech'ŏn T'an'gwang Line
- Native name: 개천탄광선 (价川炭鑛線)
- Status: Operational
- Owner: Korean State Railway
- Locale: Kaech'ŏn-si, South P'yŏngan
- Termini: Chajak; Chŏnjin
- Stations: 2

Service
- Type: Heavy rail, Freight rail

Technical
- Line length: 4.2 km (2.6 mi)
- Number of tracks: Single track
- Track gauge: 1,435 mm (4 ft 8 1/2 in) standard gauge

- Kaechon Tangwang Line
- Chosŏn'gŭl: 개천탄광선
- Hancha: 价川炭鑛線
- Revised Romanization: Gaecheontangwangseon
- McCune–Reischauer: Kaech'ŏnt'an'gwangsŏn

The Kaech'ŏn Colliery Line is an electrified railway line of the Korean State Railway in Kaech'ŏn city, South P'yŏngan Province, North Korea, running from Chajak on the Manp'o Line to Chŏnjin.

== Route ==
A yellow background in the "Distance" box indicates that section of the line is not electrified.

Distance (km)		Station Name		Former Name		
Total	S2S	Transcribed	Chosŏn'gŭl (Hanja)	Transcribed	Chosŏn'gŭl (Hanja)	Connections
0.0	0.0	Chajak	자작 (自作)			Manp'o Line
4.2	4.2	Chŏnjin	정진 (前進)			
