= Gaecheon Light Railway =

Japanese company in colonial Korea

Overview
- Native name: 개천 경변철도 (Gaecheon Gyeongbyeon Cheoldo) 价川軽便鉄道 (Kaisen Keibentetsudō)

The Gaecheon Light Railway (Korean: 개천 경변철도, Gaecheon Gyeongbyeon Cheoldo; Japanese: 价川軽便鉄道, Kaisen Keibentetsudō) was a privately owned railway company in Japanese-occupied Korea.

On 13 May 1916 the Mitsui Mining Railway (Korean: 미츠이 광산 전용 철도; MR: Mich'ŭi Kwangsan Chŏn'yong Ch'ŏldo; 三井鉱山専用鉄道, Mitsui Kōzan Sen'yō Tetsudō) opened its first railway line, a 29.5 km (18.3 mi) 762 mm (2 ft 6.0 in) narrow-gauge line from Gaecheon to Sinanju, where it connected with the Chosen Government Railway's (Sentetsu) Gyeongseong−Sinuiju mainline, the Gyeongui Line. The Mitsui Railway subsequently extended its line with a 6.3 km (3.9 mi) section from Gaecheon to Cheondong, which was opened on 1 December 1918. Passenger service was relatively frequent, with four daily return trips in 1920 between Sinanju and Jeondong; a fifth daily train ran between Sinanju and Gaecheon. In 1927 the company was reformed, becoming the Gaecheon Light Railway.

Sentetsu leased the new extension on 1 November 1932, in order to incorporate it into the Suncheon−Manpo Manpo Line then under construction; Sentetsu opened the first section, from Suncheon to Cheondong, on that same day. Sentetsu immediately began converting the Gaecheon–Cheondong section to standard gauge, completing this work on 15 July 1933, and incorporating it into the Manpo Line, whose second section from Gaecheon to Gujang was completed three months later, on 15 October 1933.

On 1 September 1933, Sentetsu bought the Gaecheon Light Railway out outright, and the remainder of the line was absorbed officially into the Sentetsu system, with the Gaecheon–Cheondong section becoming part of the Manp'o Line. The Sinanju−Gaecheon section, named the Gaecheon Line, however, remained a narrow-gauge line; it was only after the partition of Korea and the subsequent nationalisation of the railways in North Korea that it was converted to standard gauge. The Korean State Railway began the regauging work in March 1949, completing it in eight months.

== Services ==
In the November 1942 timetable, the last issued prior to the start of the Pacific War, Sentetsu - which by then had absorbed the Gaecheon Light Railway - was running six round trip passenger trains, third-class only, between Sinanju and Gaecheon daily; the 29.5 km (18.3 mi) trip was scheduled to take one hour and twenty-five minutes, and a ticket for the entire distance cost 60 sen.

== Rolling Stock ==
Little information is available about the specifics of the locomotives and rolling stock used by the Gaecheon Light Railway. However, steam locomotive No. 1 and a wooden passenger car are preserved at the Pyongyang Railway Museum. Locomotive No. 1 was originally built by the Baldwin Locomotive Works of the United States for the South Manchuria Railway, which used it on the Anpo Line prior to its conversion to standard gauge; after the regauging of the line was complete, the engine was transferred to the Gaecheon Light Railway.

== Route ==
Main Line
Distance		Station name						
Total; km	S2S; km	Transcribed, Korean	Transcribed, Japanese	Hunminjeongeum	Hanja/Kanji	Connections	Opened	Notes
0.0	0.0	Sinanju	Shin'anshū	신안주	新安州	Sentetsu Gyeongui Line	13 May 1916	to Sentetsu 1 September 1933
6.4	6.4	Anju	Anshū	안주	安州		13 May 1916	to Sentetsu 1 September 1933
11.1	4.7	Buksongni	Hokushō-ri	북송리	北松里		13 May 1916	to Sentetsu 1 September 1933
16.3	5.2	Yeonpung	Enpō	연풍	延豊		13 May 1916	to Sentetsu 1 September 1933
21.3	5.0	Unheungni	Unkō-ri	운흥리	雲興里		13 May 1916	to Sentetsu 1 September 1933
29.5	8.2	Gaecheon	Kaisen	개천	价川	Sentetsu Manpo Line (opened 1933), Gaecheon Lt Ry Joyang Colliery Line	13 May 1916	to Sentetsu 1 November 1932
35.8	6.3	Cheondong	Sentō	천동	泉洞		1 December 1918	to Sentetsu 1 November 1932

朝陽炭鉱線 - 조양탄광선 - Chōyō Tankō Line - Joyang Tangwang Line
Distance		Station name						
Total; km	S2S; km	Transcribed, Korean	Transcribed, Japanese	Hunminjeongeum	Hanja/Kanji	Connections	Opened	Notes
0.0	0.0	Gaecheon	Kaisen	개천	价川	Gaecheon Lt Ry main line	13 May 1916	to Sentetsu 1 November 1932
8.6	8.6	Gueup	Kyūō	구읍	旧邑		13 May 1916	to Sentetsu 1 November 1932
17.8	9.2	Seokgan	Sekikan	석간	石間		13 May 1916	to Sentetsu 1 November 1932
22.1	4.3	Joyang Tan-gwang (Choyang Colliery)	Chōyō Tankō	조양탄광	朝陽炭鉱		13 May 1916	to Sentetsu 1 November 1932
