= Chonjin station =

Railway station in North Korea

Ch'ŏnjin 전진

Korean name
- Hangul: 전진역
- Hanja: 前進驛
- Revised Romanization: Cheonjin-yeok
- McCune–Reischauer: Ch'ŏnjin-yŏk

General information
- Location: Ch'ŏnjin-dong, Kaech'ŏn-si, South P'yŏngan Province; North Korea
- Coordinates: 39.81118°N 125.99992°E
- Owner: Korean State Railway
- Line: Kaech'ŏn Colliery Line

Services
Preceding station	Korean State Railway	Following station
Chajak Terminus	Kaech'ŏn Colliery Line	Terminus
Location

Ch'ŏnjin station is a railway station in Ch'ŏnjin-dong, Kaech'ŏn municipal city, South P'yŏngan province, North Korea. It is the terminus of the Kaech'ŏn Colliery Line of the Korean State Railway.
