= Songam Cavern =

Cave in North Korea

Coordinates: 39.47675°N 125.605316°E

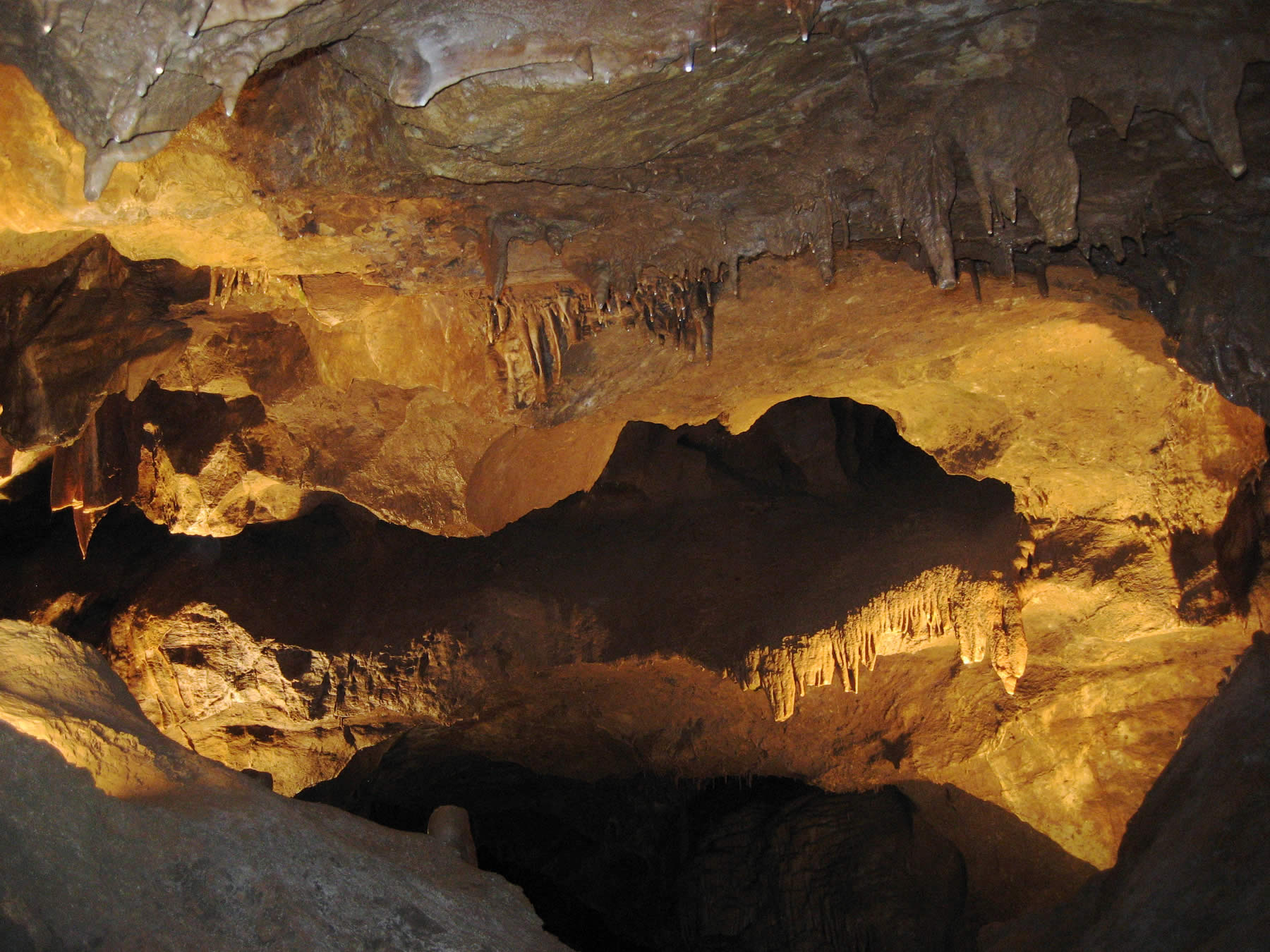

Korean name
- Hangul: 송암동굴
- Hanja: 松巖洞窟
- RR: Songam donggul
- MR: Songam tonggul

Songam Cavern (also rendered Songam Cave) is a show cave situated on the boundary between Sonam-dong, Kaechon City, and Songam-dong, Anju City, in South Pyongan Province, Democratic People's Republic of Korea.

== Geology ==
The cave extends beneath the Cholsokbong Mountains, including Cholsok Peak, and runs in a dolomite stratum dated to the Mesoproterozoic Sten period, about 1,200 to 1,000 million years ago. It has a five-floor system, with two main tunnels and 20 branches, and a total length of 5,410 m. The cave extends from 48 to 174 m above sea level, giving it a vertical range of 126 m. The surrounding area also contains karst landforms such as karren, sinkholes and swallow holes. Karstification in the Songam Cave area resulted from water descending from the Cholsokbong Mountains and moving underground through faults, fissures and bedding planes, where it formed dissolution cavities that developed into the cave. The cave consists of a trunk and dozens of branches, and its scenery is presented in more than ten sections, including Kuanmun, Phokpho and Kiam.

Dating of calcite speleothems suggests that Songam Cave formed about 80,000 to 120,000 years ago, during the last glacial period. Jon and colleagues interpreted its development as the result of groundwater moving through faults and joints in the dolomite, with dissolved carbon dioxide from overlying limonite-bearing strata helping to enlarge the cave passages. The cave's upper levels are associated with underground ponds, while the lowest level contains an underground river, consistent with a multi-level karst system.

A 2021 study described Songam Cave as rich in aragonitic anthodites as well as more typical calcite speleothems, including stalactites, stalagmites, limestone columns, flowstone, rimstone dams, botryoidal forms, pool spar, underground waterfalls and ponds. The study found that aragonite and calcite speleothems occur widely through the cave, with especially dense concentrations of aragonitic forms in some sections and mixed occurrences in others.

Songam Cave is included in the UNESCO World Heritage Centre's tentative-list entry Ryongmun Cavern and Songam Cave, submitted in 2026 under criteria (vii) and (viii). Songam Cave is a geoheritage site of high conservation significance because of its geological features and the aesthetic value of its speleothems and underground karst landscape. The cave region is set within a national nature reserve, and Songam Cave itself is registered as a national scenic location.

== Tourism ==
Songam Cave lies on the shore of Lake Yonphung, a resort area with relatively easy access. The cave was discovered in 1964 during mineral exploration in the Cholsok Peak area, and its entrance was subsequently closed for conservation. Exploration intensified in the 1990s, after which tourist routes and facilities were developed and the cave was opened to tourism in the early 2000s. The visitor route includes 16 major scenic spots, and about 2,160 m of the cave are open to visitors.

The cave maintains a nearly constant internal climate, with temperatures of about 12 °C and humidity generally above 95% throughout the year. Several ponds inside the cave, including Jangsu, Chonji and Ryonggung, show little seasonal change in water level and typically remain at 12–13 °C except during the summer rainy season. Air movement in the cave is seasonal, flowing outward in summer and inward in winter.

The UNESCO tentative-list dossier states that potential impacts from visitors, including carbon dioxide, noise and artificial light, are controlled through daily limits on visitor numbers and guide supervision. Only part of the main cave system is open to visitors, while many branch passages remain closed and continue to provide habitat for cave-dwelling invertebrates and bats.

== See also ==
- Tourism in North Korea
