= Hyoseong =

Hyoseong (Revised Romanization of 효성), also spelled Hyosŏng (McCune–Reischauer) or Hyosung (informal spelling) may refer to:

- Hyosung, South Korean industrial conglomerate
- Hyosŏng-dong, neighbourhood of Chongnam, South Pyongan, North Korea

People

- Hyoseong of Silla (died 742), 34th monarch of the Korean kingdom of Silla
- Bae Hyo-sung (born 1982), South Korean male footballer
- Jun Hyo-seong (born 1989), South Korean female singer
