= Pongchon Tangwang Line =

Railway line in North Korea

Pongch'ŏn Colliery Line

Overview
- Other name(s): Pongch'ŏn T'an'gwang Line
- Native name: 봉천탄광선 (鳳泉炭鑛線)
- Status: Operational
- Owner: Chosen Government Railway (1933–1945); Korean State Railway (since 1945)
- Locale: Kaech'ŏn-si, South P'yŏngan
- Termini: Pongch'ŏn; Pongch'ŏn Colliery
- Stations: 2

Service
- Type: Heavy rail, Freight rail

History
- Opened: 15 October 1933

Technical
- Line length: 2.0 km (1.2 mi)
- Number of tracks: Single track
- Track gauge: 1,435 mm (4 ft 8 1/2 in) standard gauge

- Pongchon Tangwang Line
- Chosŏn'gŭl: 봉천탄광선
- Hancha: 鳳泉炭鑛線
- Revised Romanization: Bongcheontangwangseon
- McCune–Reischauer: Pongch'ŏnt'an'gwangsŏn

The Pongch'ŏn Colliery Line is a non-electrified railway line of the Korean State Railway in Kaech'ŏn city, South P'yŏngan Province, North Korea, running from Pongch'ŏn on the Manp'o Line to Pongch'ŏn Colliery, serving a major anthracite mine.

== History ==
The line was opened on 15 October 1933 by the Chosen Government Railway, at the same time as the third section of the Manp'o Line from Kaech'ŏn to Kujang.

== Route ==
A yellow background in the "Distance" box indicates that section of the line is not electrified.

| Distance (km) | | Station Name | | Former Name | | |
| Total | S2S | Transcribed | Chosŏn'gŭl (Hanja) | Transcribed | Chosŏn'gŭl (Hanja) | Connections |
|---|---|---|---|---|---|---|
| 0.0 | 0.0 | Pongch'ŏn | 봉천 (泉洞) | | | Manp'o Line |
| 2.0 | 2.0 | Pongch'ŏn T'an'gwang | 봉천탄광 (鳳泉炭鑛) | | | |
