= Taegak Line =

Railway line in North Korea

Overview
- Native name: 대각선 (大角線)
- Status: Operational
- Owner: Korean State Railway
- Locale: Kaech'ŏn-si, South P'yŏngan
- Termini: Ch'ŏndong; Taegak
- Stations: 2

Service
- Type: Heavy rail, Regional rail, Freight rail

Technical
- Line length: 8.2 km (5.1 mi)
- Number of tracks: Single track
- Track gauge: 1,435 mm (4 ft 8 1/2 in) standard gauge
- Electrification: 3000 V DC Catenary

- Taegak Line
- Hangul: 대각선
- Hanja: 大角線
- RR: Daegakseon
- MR: Taegaksŏn

The Taegak Line is an electrified railway line of the Korean State Railway in Kaech'ŏn city, South P'yŏngan Province, North Korea, running from Ch'ŏndong on the Manp'o Line to Taegak.

== Route ==
A yellow background in the "Distance" box indicates that section of the line is not electrified.

Distance (km)		Station Name		Former Name		
Total	S2S	Transcribed	Chosŏn'gŭl (Hanja)	Transcribed	Chosŏn'gŭl (Hanja)	Connections
0.0	0.0	Ch'ŏndong	천동 (泉洞)			Manp'o Line
8.2	8.2	Taegak	대각 (大角)			
