= Chunhyok Line =

Railway line in North Korea

Chunhyŏk Line

Overview
- Native name: 준혁선 (俊赫線)
- Status: Operational
- Owner: Korean State Railway (since 1945)
- Locale: Kaech'ŏn-si, South P'yŏngan
- Termini: Kaech'ŏn; Chunhyŏngri
- Stations: 3

Service
- Type: Heavy rail, Regional rail, Freight rail

Technical
- Line length: 6.6 km (4.1 mi)
- Number of tracks: Single track
- Track gauge: 1,435 mm (4 ft 8 1/2 in) standard gauge

- Chunhyok Line
- Hangul: 준혁선
- Hanja: 俊赫線
- RR: Junhyeokseon
- MR: Chunhyŏksŏn

The Chunhyŏk Line is a railway line of the Korean State Railway in Kaech'ŏn city, South P'yŏngan Province, North Korea, running from Kaech'ŏn at the junction of the Kaech'ŏn and Manp'o Lines to Chunhyŏngri.

== Route ==
A yellow background in the "Distance" box indicates that section of the line is not electrified.

Distance (km)		Station Name		Former Name		
Total	S2S	Transcribed	Chosŏn'gŭl (Hanja)	Transcribed	Chosŏn'gŭl (Hanja)	Connections
0.0	0.0	Kaech'ŏn	개천 (价川)			Choyang Colliery Line, Kaech'ŏn Line, Manp'o Line
~~2.8~~	~~2.8~~	Samp'o	삼포 (三浦)			Closed.
6.6	3.8	Chunhyŏngri	준혁리 (俊赫里)			
