= Sinanju =

Coordinates: 39°36′N 125°37′E

Korean transcription(s)
  - Hangul: 신안주
  - Hanja: 新安州
  - Revised Romanization: Sinanju
  - McCune–Reischauer: Sinanju
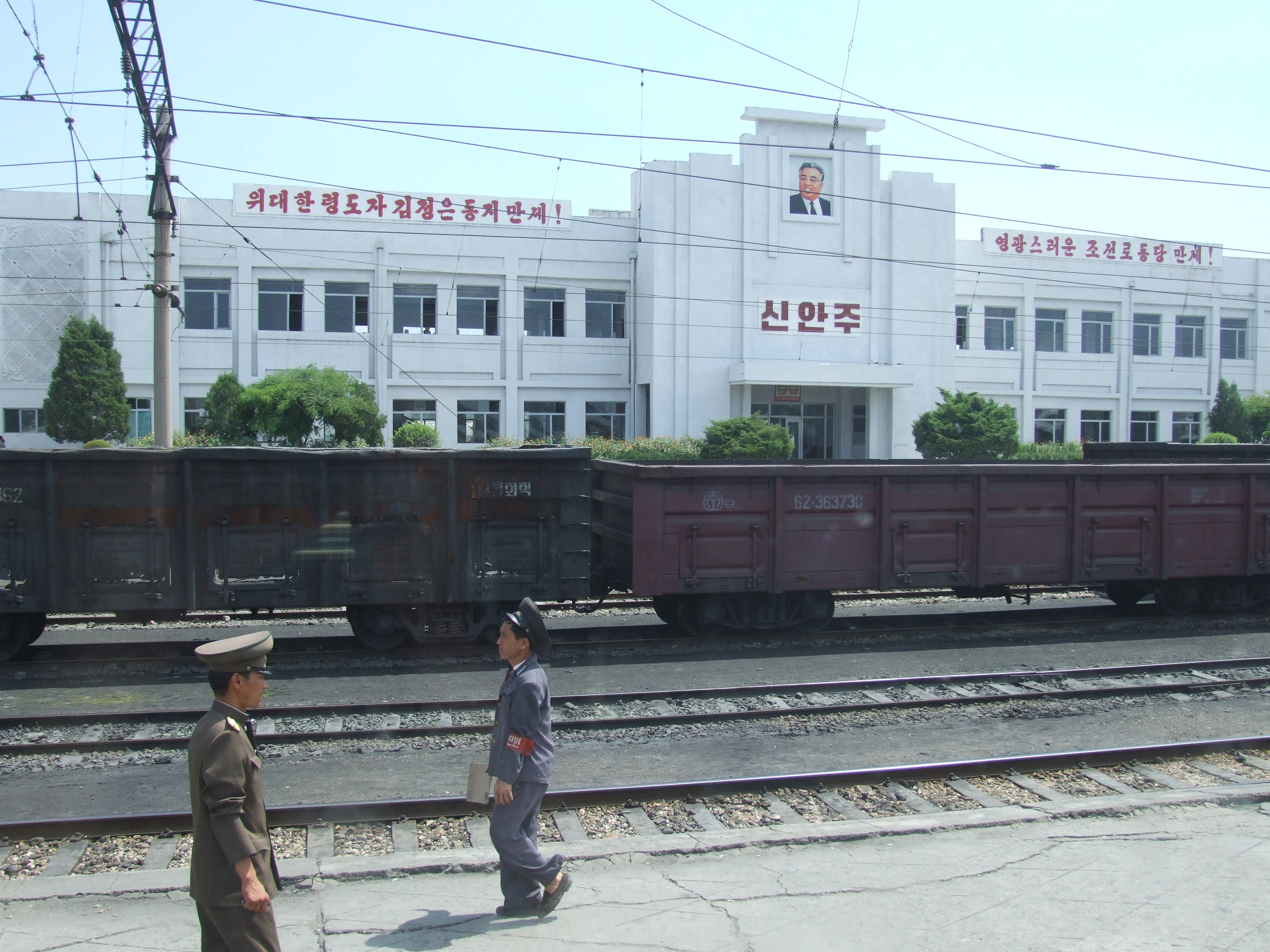
- Sinanju Chongnyon Station
- Interactive map of Sinanju
- Country: North Korea
- Province: South Pyongan Province

Population (2006)
  - Total: 15,835

Sinanju is a region (신안주) in Anju city, South Pyongan Province, North Korea. The name literally means "Comfortable New Village." When Anju County was raised to the status of a city in August 1987, Sinanju Workers' District was divided into Sinwon-dong, Wonhung-dong, Yokchon-dong.

== History ==
On May 9, 1951, the U.S. Air Force conducted the most massive airstrike of the Korean war to date - at least 300 planes converged on a city on the Yalu River.

Sinanju's bridges and railways were bombed by the United States Air Force during the Korean War to halt the transport of supplies to North Korea. During the second Korean winter, railways and bridges leading from Sinanju to Chongju were bombed by the U.S. on January 25, 1952, but were repaired five days later. During the last week of March 1952, U.S. forces began using B-29 Superfortresses through April to destroy bridges between Sinanju and Pyongyang.

During the third Korean winter of the war, the USAF targeted five railroad bridges over the Chongchon Estuary near Sinanju in January 1953. Trains were supposed to dock in marshaling yards there. Allied bombers destroyed them at night, but this only stopped enemy transport temporarily. Consequentially, in Spring of 1953, Communist troops had more difficulty transporting troops and supplies due to relentless allied intervention.

According to a bomb assessment conducted by the U.S. Air Force, over the course of the Korean War 100 percent of Sinanju was destroyed by the U.S. bombing; four other North Korean cities were at least 90 percent destroyed.
