= Chondong station =

Railway station in North Korea

Ch'ŏndong 천동

Korean name
- Hangul: 천동역
- Hanja: 泉洞驛
- Revised Romanization: Cheondong-yeok
- McCune–Reischauer: Ch'ŏndong-yŏk

General information
- Location: Ryongjin-dong, Kaech'ŏn-si, South P'yŏngan Province; North Korea
- Coordinates: 39.6531°N 125.9081°E
- Owner: Korean State Railway
- Line: Manp'o Line

History
- Opened: 1 December 1918
- Original company: Mitsui Mining Railway (to 1927); Kaech'ŏn Light Railway (to 1932); Chosen Government Railway

Services
Preceding station	Korean State Railway	Following station
Kaech'ŏn towards Manp'o Ch'ŏngnyŏn	Manp'o Line	Ryongwŏlli towards Sunch'ŏn
Terminus	Taegak Line	Taegak Terminus
Location

Ch'ŏndong station is a railway station in Ryongjin-dong, Kaech'ŏn municipal city, South P'yŏngan province, North Korea on the Manp'o Line of the Korean State Railway; it is also the starting point of the Taegak Branch to Taegak.

== History ==
The station was opened on 1 December 1918 by the Mitsui Mining Railway, which became the Kaech'ŏn Light Railway in 1927, whose line from Kaech'ŏn to Ch'ŏndong was taken over by the Chosen Government Railway in 1932.
