= Kanggye station =

Railway station in Kanggye, North Korea

Kanggye 강계

Korean name
- Hangul: 강계역
- Hanja: 江界驛
- Revised Romanization: Ganggye-yeok
- McCune–Reischauer: Kanggye-yŏk

General information
- Location: Kanggye-si, Chagang Province; North Korea
- Coordinates: 40.9705°N 126.5814°E
- Owner: Korean State Railway
- Lines: Manp'o Line; Kanggye Line

History
- Opened: 1 December 1937
- Original company: Chosen Government Railway

Services
Preceding station	Korean State Railway	Following station
Kokha towards Manp'o Ch'ŏngnyŏn	Manp'o Line	Kongin towards Sunch'ŏn
Terminus	Kanggye Line	Nammun towards Rangrim
Location

Kanggye station is a railway station in Kanggye municipal city, Chagang Province, North Korea, on the Manp'o Line of the Korean State Railway; it is also the starting point of the narrow-gauge Kanggye Line to Rangrim.

== History ==
The station was opened on 1 December 1937 by the Chosen Government Railway, along with the rest of the seventh section of the Manp'o Line from Chŏnch'ŏn (now called Hwaam) to Kanggye.
