= Anju, South Pyongan =

Anju 안주
- Municipal City

Korean transcription(s)
  - Chosŏn'gŭl: 안주
  - Hancha: 安州
  - McCune-Reischauer: Anju
  - Revised Romanization: Anju
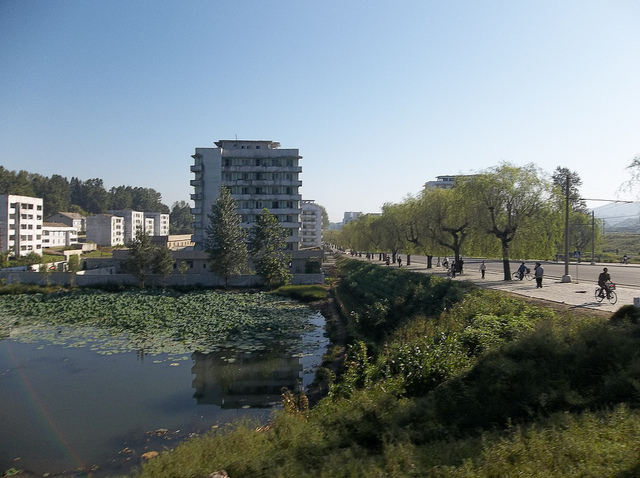
- View of Anju
- Interactive map of Anju
- Location within North Korea
- Coordinates: 39°37′12″N 125°39′36″E
- Country: North Korea
- Province: South P'yongan
- Administrative divisions: 20 tong, 22 ri

Population (2008)
  - Total: 240,117
  - Dialect: P'yŏngan
- Time zone: UTC+9 (Pyongyang Time)

Anju (Korean: 안주; Korean pronunciation: [an.dzu]) is a city in South Pyongan Province, North Korea. Its population was 240,117 in 2008. The Ch'ongch'on River passes through Anju.

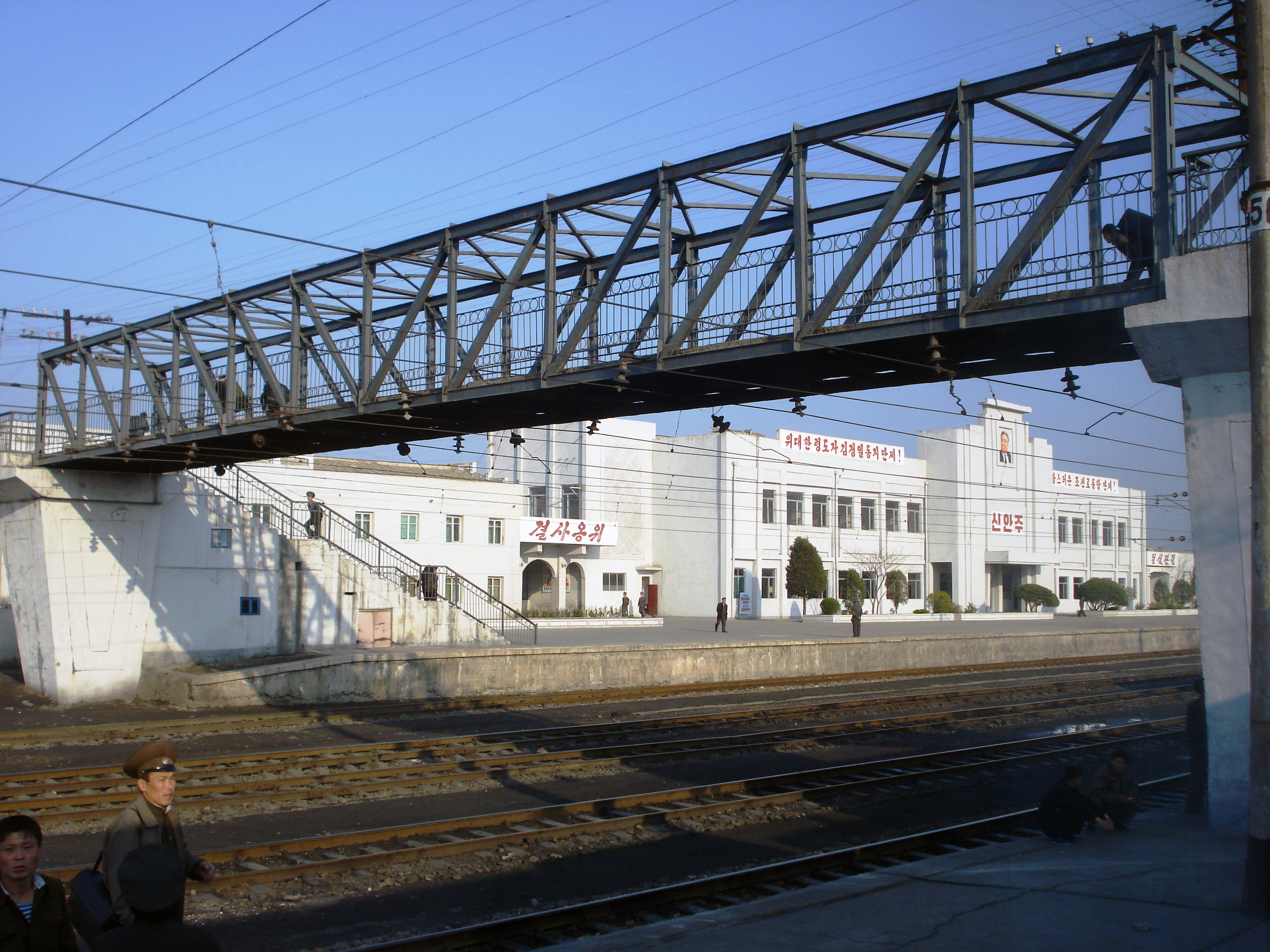
Sinanju Chongnyon station in the western part of Anju

== Climate ==
Climate data for Anju, South Pyongan (1991–2020)
Month	Jan	Feb	Mar	Apr	May	Jun	Jul	Aug	Sep	Oct	Nov	Dec	Year
Mean daily maximum °C (°F)	−1.1 (30.0)	2.4 (36.3)	8.8 (47.8)	16.4 (61.5)	22.2 (72.0)	26.3 (79.3)	28.3 (82.9)	29.1 (84.4)	25.4 (77.7)	18.5 (65.3)	9.0 (48.2)	0.5 (32.9)	15.5 (59.9)
Daily mean °C (°F)	−6.5 (20.3)	−2.9 (26.8)	3.2 (37.8)	10.3 (50.5)	16.3 (61.3)	21.1 (70.0)	24.2 (75.6)	24.5 (76.1)	19.4 (66.9)	12.1 (53.8)	3.9 (39.0)	−4.1 (24.6)	10.1 (50.2)
Mean daily minimum °C (°F)	−11.5 (11.3)	−7.7 (18.1)	−1.5 (29.3)	4.6 (40.3)	10.8 (51.4)	16.5 (61.7)	20.7 (69.3)	20.7 (69.3)	14.5 (58.1)	6.6 (43.9)	−0.6 (30.9)	−8.2 (17.2)	5.4 (41.7)
Average precipitation mm (inches)	7.8 (0.31)	15.2 (0.60)	20.9 (0.82)	48.8 (1.92)	78.8 (3.10)	97.8 (3.85)	292.8 (11.53)	243.8 (9.60)	100.3 (3.95)	50.1 (1.97)	46.0 (1.81)	15.4 (0.61)	1,017.7 (40.07)
Average precipitation days (≥ 0.1 mm)	2.9	3.2	3.7	5.7	7.5	8.0	12.0	10.0	6.0	5.5	6.4	5.1	76.0
Average snowy days	3.9	2.7	1.6	0.1	0.0	0.0	0.0	0.0	0.0	0.1	1.3	4.7	14.4
Average relative humidity (%)	70.8	67.7	67.3	66.1	70.8	76.4	82.8	82.0	76.2	72.4	72.4	71.2	73.0
Source: Korea Meteorological Administration

== Administrative divisions ==
Anju-si is divided into 20 tong (neighbourhoods) and 22 ri (villages):

- Chŏnsan-dong (전산동)
- Kubong-dong (구봉동)
- Namch'ŏn-dong (남천동)
- Namp'yŏng-dong (남평동)
- Namhŭng-dong (남흥동)
- Tŏksŏng-dong (덕성동)
- Toksan-dong (독산동)
- Tŭngbangsan-dong (등방산동)
- Ryongyŏn-dong (룡연동)
- Munbong-dong (문봉동)
- Misang-dong (미상동)
- Songam-dong (송암동)
- Sinwŏn-dong (신원동)
- Yŏkchŏn-dong (역전동)
- Wŏnhŭng-dong (원흥동)
- Ch'angsong-dong (창송동)
- Ch'ŏngsong-dong (청송동)
- Ch'ŏngch'ŏn'gang-dong (청천강동)
- Ch'ilsŏng-dong (칠성동)
- P'ungyŏn-dong (풍년동)
- Changch'ŏl-li (장천리)
- Chunghŭng-ri (중흥리)
- Kuryong-ri (구룡리)
- Namch'il-li (남칠리)
- Pallyong-ri (반룡리)
- P'yŏngryul-li (평률리)
- Ripsŏng-ri (립석리)
- Ryongbong-ri (룡복리)
- Ryongdam-ri (룡담리)
- Ryonggye-ri (룡계리)
- Ryonghŭng-ri (룡흥리)
- Ryonghwa-ri (룡화리)
- Ryongjŏl-li (룡전리)
- Sangsŏ-ri (상서리)
- Sinhŭng-ri (신흥리)
- Songdo-ri (송도리)
- Songhang-ri (송학리)
- Sŏnhŭng-ri (선흥리)
- Unhang-ri (운학리)
- Unsong-ri (운송리)
- Wŏnp'ung-ri (원풍리)
- Yŏnp'ung-ri (연풍리)

== Economy ==
Anju lies near large deposits of anthracite coal, and contains one of the largest coal production facilities in the country. The deposits contain more than 130 million metric tons of coal. Namhŭng-dong is the location of the Namhŭng Youth Chemical Complex, one of North Korea's most important chemical combines. Anju also contains at least one hotel open for foreigners, used primarily to accommodate for more travelers during peak holiday times.

Anju is the location of the Cemetery for Martyrs of the Chinese People's Volunteers, commemorating Korean War dead.

== Transportation ==
Anju-si is served by several stations on the P'yŏngŭi and Kaech'ŏn lines of the Korean State Railway.

Anju has a trolleybus system with one line to Sinanju Chongnyon station. It formerly had another line to Namhung Youth Chemical Complex that looped around the entire complex which closed around 2000.

== See also ==
- List of cities in North Korea
