= Samsan station (Unsan Line) =

Closed railway station in Unsan, North Korea

Samsan 삼산

Korean name
- Hangul: 삼산역
- Hanja: 三山驛
- Revised Romanization: Samsan-yeok
- McCune–Reischauer: Samsan-yŏk

General information
- Location: Pukchil-lodongjagu, Unsan-gun, North P'yŏngan; North Korea
- Owner: Korean State Railway

History
- Opened: 1970s
- Closed: ?
- Original company: Korean State Railway

Services
| Preceding station | Korean State Railway | Following station |
|---|---|---|
| Terminus | Unsan Line | Pangŏ towards Puksinhyŏn |

Samsan station is a closed railway station in Pukchil-lodongjagu, Unsan county, North P'yŏngan province, North Korea, on the former Unsan Line of the Korean State Railway. It was originally opened by the Korean State Railway in the 1970s.
