= Chupyong Line =

Railway line in North Korea

Ch'up'yŏng Line

Overview
- Native name: 추평선 (楸坪線)
- Status: Operational
- Locale: Hŭich'ŏn-si, Ryanggang
- Termini: Hŭich'ŏn Ch'ŏngnyŏn; P'ungsan-dong
- Stations: 3

Service
- Type: Heavy rail, Freight rail

Technical
- Number of tracks: Single track
- Track gauge: 1,435 mm (4 ft 8 1/2 in) standard gauge

- Chupyong Line
- Hangul: 추평선
- Hanja: 楸坪線
- RR: Chupyeongseon
- MR: Ch'up'yŏngsŏn

The Ch'up'yŏng Line is a non-electrified railway line of the Korean State Railway in Hŭich'ŏn city, Ryanggang Province, North Korea, running from Hŭich'ŏn Ch'ŏngnyŏn Station on the Manp'o Line to industrial suburbs on the opposite side of the Ch'ŏngch'ŏn River.

== Route ==
A yellow background in the "Distance" box indicates that section of the line is not electrified.

Distance (km)		Station Name		Former Name		
Total	S2S	Transcribed	Chosŏn'gŭl (Hanja)	Transcribed	Chosŏn'gŭl (Hanja)	Connections
0.0	0.0	Hŭich'ŏn Ch'ŏngnyŏn	희천청년 (煕川靑年)	Hŭich'ŏn	희천 (煕川)	Manp'o Line
3.2	3.2	Ch'up'yŏng 2-dong	추평2동 (楸坪二洞)			
4.6	1.4	P'ungsan-dong	풍산동 (風山洞)			
