= Myonghak Line =

Railway line in North Korea

Myŏnghak Line

Overview
- Native name: 명학선 (鳴鶴線)
- Status: Operational
- Owner: Korean State Railway
- Locale: South P'yŏngan
- Termini: Tŭkchang; Myŏnghak
- Stations: 2

Service
- Type: Heavy rail, Freight rail
- Operator(s): Korean State Railway

Technical
- Line length: 2.6 km (1.6 mi)
- Number of tracks: Single track
- Track gauge: 1,435 mm (4 ft 8 1/2 in) standard gauge
- Electrification: 3000 V DC Catenary

- Myonghak Line
- Hangul: 명학선
- Hanja: 鳴鶴線
- RR: Myeonghakseon
- MR: Myŏnghaksŏn

The Myŏnghak Line is an electrified railway line of the Korean State Railway in South P'yŏngan Province, North Korea, running from Tŭkchang on the Tŭkchang Line to Myŏnghak.

== Route ==
A yellow background in the "Distance" box indicates that section of the line is not electrified.

Distance (Total; km)	Distance (S2S; km)	Station Name (Transcribed)	Station Name (Chosŏn'gŭl (Hanja))	Former Name (Transcribed)	Former name (Chosŏn'gŭl (Hanja))	Connections
-2.6	0.0	Tŭkchang	득장 (得將)			Tŭkchang Line
0.0	2.6	(junction)				Tŭkchang Line junction
2.6	2.6 (from junction)	Myŏnghak	명학 (鳴鶴)			
