= Choyang Tangwang Line =

Railway line in North Korea

Choyang Colliery Line

Overview
- Other name(s): Choyang T'an'gwang Line
- Native name: 조양탄광선 (朝陽炭鑛線)
- Status: Operational
- Owner: Mitsui Mining Railway (1916–1927); Kaech'ŏn Light Railway (1927–1932); Chosen Government Railway (1932–1945); Korean State Railway (since 1945)
- Locale: Kaech'ŏn-si, South P'yŏngan
- Termini: Kaech'ŏn; Choyang Colliery
- Stations: 4

Service
- Type: Heavy rail, Regional rail, Freight rail

History
- Opened: 13 May 1916

Technical
- Line length: 22.1 km (13.7 mi)
- Number of tracks: Single track
- Track gauge: 1,435 mm (4 ft 8 1/2 in) standard gauge
- Electrification: 3000 V DC Catenary

- Choyang Tangwang Line
- Chosŏn'gŭl: 조양탄광선
- Hancha: 朝陽炭鑛線
- Revised Romanization: Joyangtangwangseon
- McCune–Reischauer: Choyangt'an'gwangsŏn

The Choyang T'an'gwang Line, or Choyang Colliery Line is an electrified railway line of the Korean State Railway in Kaech'ŏn city, South P'yŏngan Province, North Korea, running from Kaech'ŏn at the junction of the Kaech'ŏn and Manp'o Lines to Choyang Colliery.

== History ==
The Choyang Colliery Line was opened on 13 May 1916 by the Mitsui Mining Railway, which became the Kaech'ŏn Light Railway in 1927; the Kaech'ŏn Light Railway was subsequently taken over by the Chosen Government Railway on 1 November 1932.

== Route ==
A yellow background in the "Distance" box indicates that a section of the line is not electrified.

| Distance (km) | | Station Name | | Former Name | | |
| Total | S2S | Transcribed | Chosŏn'gŭl (Hanja) | Transcribed | Chosŏn'gŭl (Hanja) | Connections |
|---|---|---|---|---|---|---|
| 0.0 | 0.0 | Kaech'ŏn | 개천 (价川) | | | Chunhyŏk Line, Kaech'ŏn Line, Manp'o Line |
| 8.6 | 8.6 | Kuŭp | 구읍 (舊邑) | | | |
| 17.8 | 9.2 | Sŏkkan | 석간 (石間) | | | |
| 22.1 | 4.3 | Choyang T'an'gwang (Choyang Colliery) | 조양탄광 (朝陽炭鑛) | | | |
