= Rangrim station =

Railway station in North Korea

Rangrim 랑림

Korean name
- Hangul: 랑림역
- Hanja: 狼林驛
- Revised Romanization: Rangnim-yeok
- McCune–Reischauer: Rangrim-yŏk

General information
- Location: Rangrim-ŭp, Rangrim County; Chagang Province; North Korea
- Coordinates: 40.9674°N 127.1262°E
- Owner: Korean State Railway
- Lines: Manp'o Line; Kanggye Line

History
- Opened: 1948
- Former names: Tongmun'gŏri (동문거리 (東門巨里))

Services
Preceding station	Korean State Railway	Following station
Omandong towards Kanggye	Kanggye Line	Terminus
Location

Rangrim station is a railway station in Rangrim-ŭp, Rangrim County, Chagang Province, North Korea, the terminus of the narrow-gauge Kanggye Line of the Korean State Railway.

== History ==
Rangrim station, originally called Tongmun'gŏri station (동문거리 (東門巨里)), was opened along with the rest of the Kanggye Line by the Korean State Railway in 1948. It received its current name in 1953.
