= Chinese People's Volunteer Army Martyrs' Cemetery =

Military cemetery in South Pyongan Province, North Korea

Coordinates: 39.10769°N 126.45650°E

The Chinese People's Volunteer Army Martyrs' Cemetery is a cemetery in Hoechang County, South Pyongan Province, North Korea.

The Hoechang County cemetery is the largest Chinese People's Volunteers (CPV) cemetery in North Korea, of 90,000 square metres (970,000 sq ft) and houses the remains of 134 Chinese People's Volunteer Army dead from the Korean War, including those of Mao Anying, killed in 1950, the son of Mao Zedong, founder of the People's Republic of China.

Construction was completed in 1957; it was visited by Chinese Premier Zhou Enlai in 1958.

Kim Jong Un, leader of North Korea, laid a wreath at the cemetery's CPV monument on 27 July 2023, the 70th anniversary of the Korean Armistice Agreement which ended hostilities of the Korean War.
