= Unsan Line =

Railway line in North Korea

Overview
- Native name: 운산선 (雲山線)
- Status: Closed
- Owner: Korean State Railway
- Locale: North P'yŏngan
- Termini: Puksinhyŏn; Samsan
- Stations: 7

Service
- Type: Heavy rail, Passenger & freight rail Regional rail

History
- Opened: 1970s
- Closed: 1990s

Technical
- Line length: 45 km (28 mi) (est.)
- Number of tracks: Single track
- Track gauge: 762 mm (2 ft 6 in)
Route map
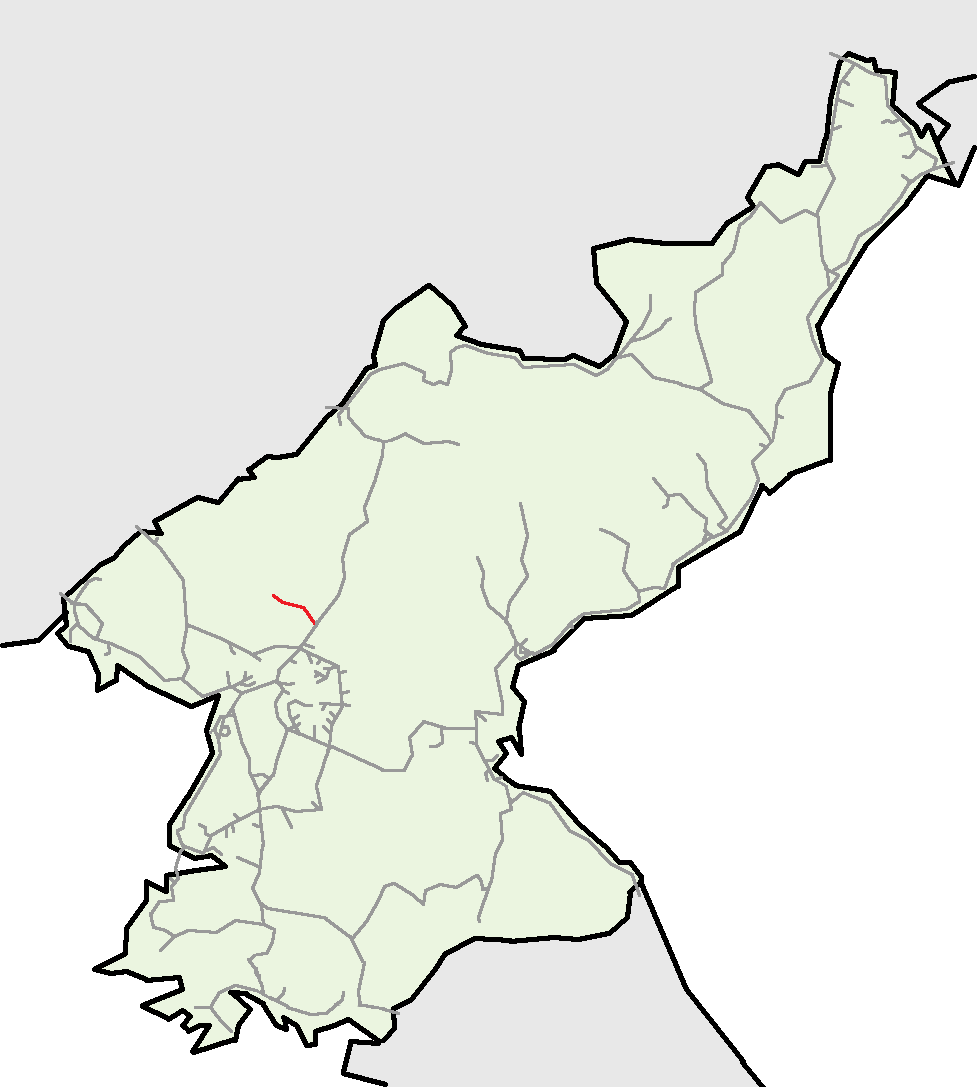

- Unsan Line
- Hangul: 운산선
- Hanja: 雲山線
- RR: Unsanseon
- MR: Unsansŏn

The Unsan Line is a former non-electrified narrow gauge line of the Korean State Railway in North P'yŏngan Province, North Korea, running from Puksinhyŏl-li, Hyangsan County on the Manp'o Line to Samsal-ri, Unsan County.

== History ==
The Unsan Line was originally opened by the Korean State Railway in the 1970s; it was closed some time in the 1990s.

Trains on the line were pulled by Czechoslovak-built 400 series 0-6-0T steam tank locomotives.

By December 2003, there was little that remained of the line, with only the bridge abutments leaving Puksinhyon station being visible and no buildings or locomotives seen.

== Routes ==
A yellow background in the "Distance" box indicates that section of the line is not electrified; a pink background indicates that section is 2 ft 6 in (762 mm) narrow gauge; an orange background indicates that section is non-electrified narrow gauge.

Distance (km)		Station Name		Former Name		
Total	S2S	Transcribed	Chosŏn'gŭl (Hanja)	Transcribed	Chosŏn'gŭl (Hanja)	Connections
~~0.0~~	~~0.0~~	Puksinhyŏn	북신현 (北薪峴)			Manp'o Line
~~6.5~~	~~6.5~~	Rohyŏn	로현 (蘆峴)			Distance estimated.
~~14.5~~	~~8.0~~	Sangsŏ	상서 (上西)			Distance estimated.
~~22.0~~	~~7.5~~	Undaesan	운대산 (雲台山)			Distance estimated.
~~28.0~~	~~6.0~~	P'yŏngbuk Unsan	평북운산 (平北雲山)			Distance estimated.
~~36.0~~	~~8.0~~	Pang'ŏ	방어 (防禦)			Distance estimated.
~~45.0~~	~~9.0~~	Samsan	삼산 (三山)			Distance estimated.
