= Chundu station =

Railway station in North Korea

Ch'undu 춘두

Korean name
- Hangul: 춘두역
- Hanja: 춘두驛
- Revised Romanization: Chundu-yeok
- McCune–Reischauer: Ch'undu-yŏk

General information
- Location: Kyŏnghŭng, North Hamgyŏng; North Korea
- Coordinates: 42.5760°N 130.3361°E
- Owner: Korean State Railway
- Line: Hambuk Line

History
- Original company: Chosen Government Railway

Services
Preceding station	Korean State Railway	Following station
Songhak Terminus	Ch'undu Line	Terminus
Location

Ch'undu station is a railway station in Kyŏnghŭng county, North Hamgyŏng province, North Korea. It is the terminus of the Ch'undu Line of the Korean State Railway.
