= Sinanju Chongnyon station =

Railway station in Anju, North Korea

Sinanju Ch'ŏngnyŏn 신안주청년
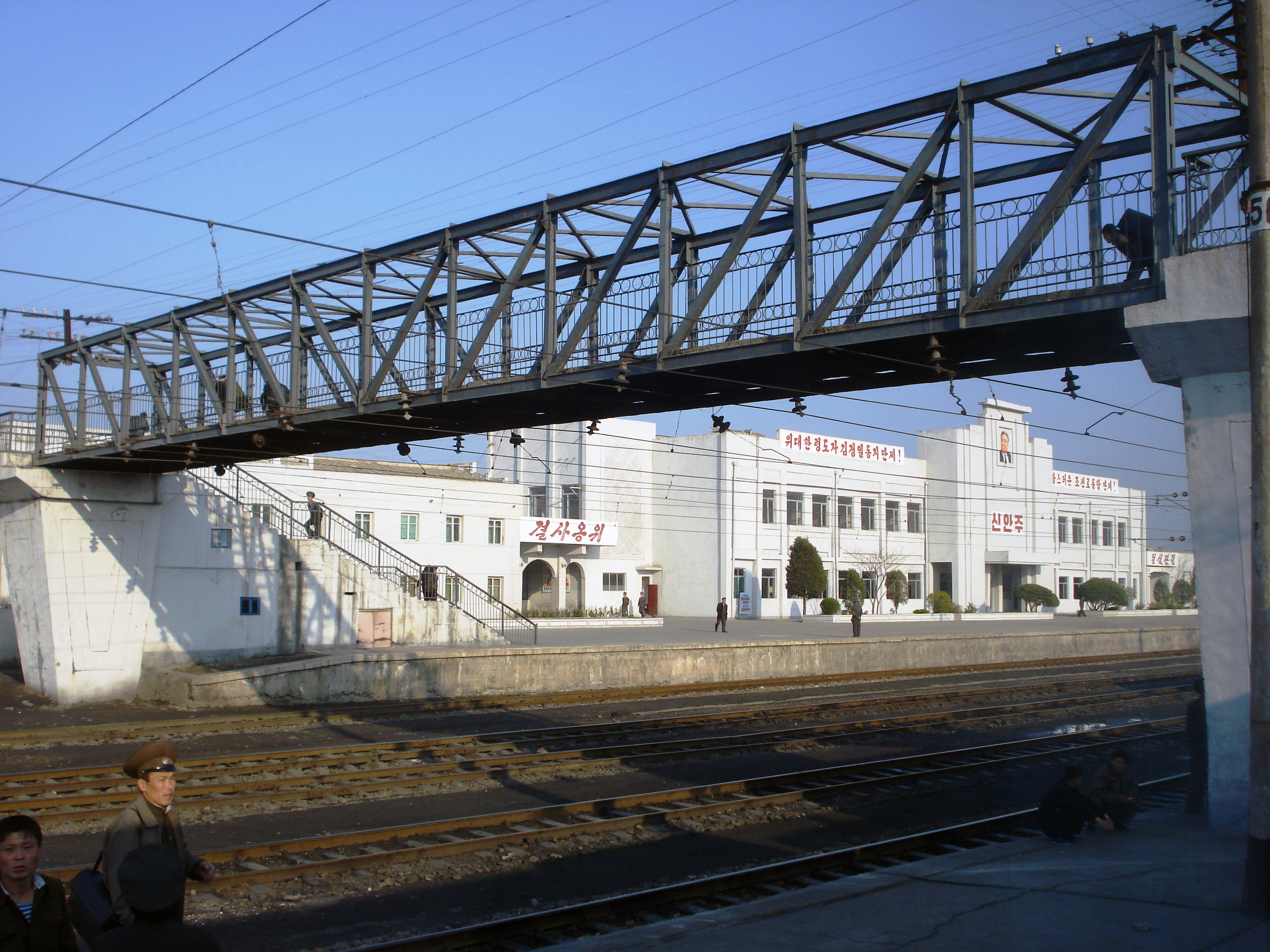
- Trackside view of Sinanju Ch'ŏngnyŏn station

Korean name
- Hangul: 신안주청년역
- Hanja: 新安州靑年驛
- Revised Romanization: Sinanjucheongnyeon-yeok
- McCune–Reischauer: Sinanjuch'ŏngnyŏn-yŏk

General information
- Location: Sinanju; Yŏkchŏn-dong, Anju-si, South P'yŏngan; North Korea
- Coordinates: 39°36′4″N 125°36′12″E
- Owner: Korean State Railway

History
- Opened: 5 November 1905
- Rebuilt: 1954

Services
Preceding station	Korean State Railway	Following station
Ch'ŏngch'ŏn'gang towards Dandong (China)	P'yŏngŭi Line	Taegyo towards P'yŏngyang
Terminus	Kaech'ŏn Line	Anju towards Kaech'ŏn
Location

Sinanju Ch'ŏngnyŏn station is a satellite railway station in Sinanju, a town in Yŏkchŏn-dong, Anju-si, South P'yŏngan Province, North Korea. It is the junction point of the P'yŏngŭi and Kaech'ŏn lines of the Korean State Railway. It is located near the Ch'ŏngch'ŏn River, which forms the boundary between South P'yŏngan and North P'yŏngan provinces.

== History ==
The station was opened, along with the rest of this section of the Kyŏngŭi Line, on 5 November 1905, as Sinanju station. As the station was built to the west of the town of Anju, a new village was soon built up around the station.

After the bridge across the Yalu River was opened on 1 November 1911, connecting Sinŭiju to Dandong, China, Sinanju station became a stop for international trains to and from Manchuria. It is still a stopping point for international trains between P'yŏngyang and Beijing.

After the Second World War, Sinanju station came under the administration of North Korea. During the Korean War, the station and the surrounding area – an important hub for land transport in the north – was bombed heavily. In December 1952, the administrative districts of North Korea were reorganised, and Sinanju was incorporated into the city of Anju. The station was rebuilt after the war by Youth Shock Troops, and was at the same time renamed to its current name.
