= Chongnam =

Ch'ŏngnam District 청남
- District

Korean transcription(s)
  - Chosŏn'gŭl: 청남구
  - Hancha: 清南區
  - McCune–Reischauer: Ch'ŏngnam-guyŏk
  - Revised Romanization: Cheongnam-guyeok
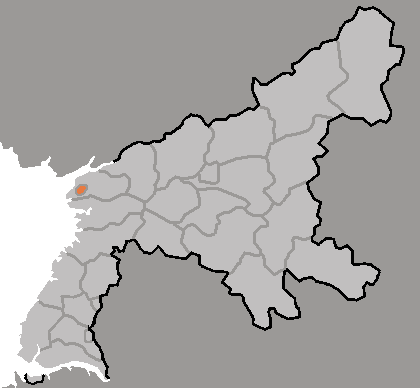
- Country: North Korea
- Province: South P'yŏngan
- Administrative divisions: 9 tong, 2 ri

Area
  - Total: 359 km^{2} (139 sq mi)

Population (2008)
  - Total: 73,290
  - Density: 204/km^{2} (529/sq mi)

Ch'ŏngnam-kuyok is a district in South P'yŏngan province, North Korea.

== Administrative districts ==
The district is split into 9 dong (neighborhoods) and 2 ri (villages).

	Chosŏn'gŭl	Hancha
Chungsŏng-dong	충성동	忠誠洞
Hyosŏng-dong	효성동	曉星洞
Kangsŏng-dong	강성동	强盛洞
Kom'ŭn'gŭm-dong	검은금동	
Munhwa-dong	문화동	文化洞
Ragwŏn-dong	락원동	樂園洞
Saegori-dong	새거리동	
Sangbong-dong	상봉동	相逢洞
San'ŏp-dong	산업동	産業洞
Ryongbung-ri	룡북리	龍北里
Sil-li	신리	新里

== Transportation ==
Ch'ŏngnam district is served by the Sŏhae Line of the Korean State Railway.
