= Bongcheon station =

Station of the Seoul Metropolitan Subway

Coordinates: 37.48236°N 126.94194°E

봉천; Bongcheon
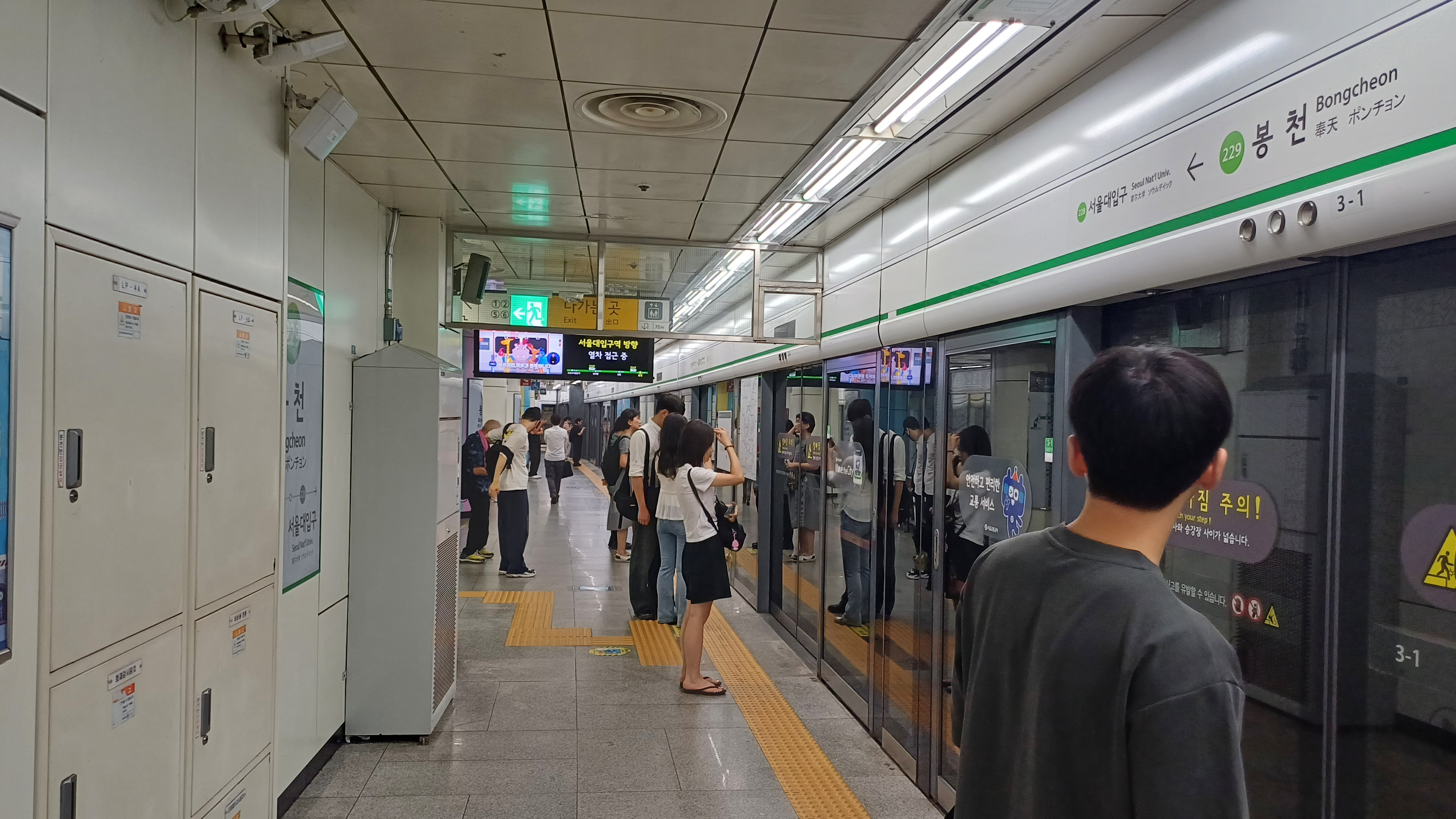
- Station platform

Korean name
- Hangul: 봉천역
- Hanja: 奉天驛
- RR: Bongcheon-yeok
- MR: Pongch'ŏn-yŏk

General information
- Location: 979-7 Bongcheon-dong, 1721 Nambusunhwanno Jiha, Gwanak-gu, Seoul
- Operator: Seoul Metro
- Line: Line 2
- Platforms: 1
- Tracks: 2

Construction
- Structure type: Underground

History
- Opened: May 22, 1984

Passengers
- (Daily) Based on Jan-Dec of 2012. Line 2: 46,635

Services
Preceding station	Seoul Metropolitan Subway	Following station
Seoul National University Next counterclockwise	Line 2	Sillim Next clockwise
Location

Bongcheon Station is a station on the Seoul Subway Line 2. It is located in Bongcheon-dong, Gwanak District, Seoul, South Korea, close to Gwanaksan Mountain.

== Station layout ==
G	Street level	Exit

L1; Concourse	Lobby	Customer Service, Shops, Vending machines, ATMs

L2; Platform level	Inner circle	← Line 2 Next clockwise (Sillim)
L2; Platform level	Island platform, doors will open on the left
L2; Platform level	Outer circle	Line 2 Next counterclockwise (Seoul Nat'l Univ.) →
