= Chundu Line =

Railway line in North Korea

Ch'undu Line

Overview
- Native name: 춘두선(춘두線)
- Status: Operational
- Owner: Korean State Railway
- Locale: North Hamgyŏng
- Termini: Songhak; Ch'undu
- Stations: 2

Service
- Type: Heavy rail, Freight rail Regional rail
- Operator(s): Korean State Railway

Technical
- Number of tracks: Single track
- Track gauge: 1,435 mm (4 ft 8 1/2 in) standard gauge

- Chundu Line
- Hangul: 춘두선
- Hanja: 춘두線
- RR: Chunduseon
- MR: Ch'undusŏn

The Ch'undu Line is a non-electrified freight-only railway line of the Korean State Railway in North Korea, connecting Songhak on the Hambuk Line with Ch'undu.

== Route ==
A yellow background in the "Distance" box indicates that section of the line is not electrified.

Distance (km)		Station Name		Former Name		
Total	S2S	Transcribed	Chosŏn'gŭl (Hanja)	Transcribed	Chosŏn'gŭl (Hanja)	Connections
0.0	0.0	Songhak	송학 (松鶴)		Hambuk Line	
4.5	4.5	Ch'undu	춘두 (-)			
