= Cemetery for Martyrs of the Chinese People's Volunteers =

Cemetery and memorial park in Anju City, North Korea

Coordinates: 39.59631°N 125.63853°E

The Cemetery for Martyrs of the Chinese People's Volunteers(中國人民支援軍烈士陵园,중국인민지원군렬사릉원) is a cemetery and memorial park in Anju, South Pyongan, North Korea.

The cemetery houses the remains of 1,156 Chinese People's Volunteers railway soldiers killed during the Korean War, and is a focal point for China-Korean relations.
