= Songhak station =

Railway station in North Korea

Songhak 송학

Korean name
- Hangul: 송학역
- Hanja: 松鶴驛
- Revised Romanization: Songhak-yeok
- McCune–Reischauer: Songhak-yŏk

General information
- Location: Songhang-ri, Kyŏnghŭng, North Hamgyŏng; North Korea
- Coordinates: 42.5585°N 130.3686°E
- Owner: Korean State Railway
- Line: Hambuk Line

History
- Opened: 16 November 1929
- Original company: Chosen Government Railway

Services
| Preceding station | Korean State Railway | Following station |
|---|---|---|
| Haksong towards Rajin | Hambuk Line | Sinasan towards Ch'ŏngjin Ch'ŏngnyŏn |
| Terminus | Ch'undu Line | Chundu Terminus |
Location

Songhak station is a railway station in Songhang-ri, Kyŏnghŭng county, North Hamgyŏng province, North Korea, on the Hambuk Line of the Korean State Railway; it is also the starting point of the Ch'undu Line.

The station was opened on 16 November 1929 by the Chosen Government Railway (Sentetsu) as part of the East Tomun Line from Unggi (now Sŏnbong) to Sinasan, which was later extended to Tonggwanjin.
