= Kaechon station =

Railway station in North Korea

Kaech'ŏn 개천

Korean name
- Hangul: 개천역
- Hanja: 价川驛
- Revised Romanization: Gaecheon-nyeok
- McCune–Reischauer: Kaech'ŏn-nyŏk

General information
- Location: Kaech'ŏn-si, South P'yŏngan Province; North Korea
- Coordinates: 39.7026°N 125.8869°E
- Owner: Korean State Railway
- Lines: Manp'o Line, Kaech'ŏn Line

History
- Opened: 13 May 1916
- Original company: Mitsui Mining Railway (to 1927); Kaech'ŏn Light Railway (to 1932); Chosen Government Railway

Services
Preceding station	Korean State Railway	Following station
Unhŭngri towards Sinanju Ch'ŏngnyŏn	Kaech'ŏn Line	Terminus
Wŏlli towards Manp'o Ch'ŏngnyŏn	Manp'o Line	Ch'ŏndong towards Sunch'ŏn
Terminus	Chunhyŏk Line	Samp'o towards Chunhyŏngri
Terminus	Choyang Colliery Line	Kuŭp towards Choyang T'an'gwang
Location

Kaech'ŏn station is a railway station in Kaech'ŏn municipal city, South P'yŏngan province, North Korea, on the Manp'o Line of the Korean State Railway; it is also the starting point of the Kaech'ŏn Line to Sinanju, of the Choyang Colliery Line to Choyang Colliery and the Chunhyŏk Line to Chunhyŏngri.

Kaech'ŏn station is an important station in terms of both passenger and freight trains.

== History ==
The station was opened on 13 May 1916 by the Mitsui Mining Railway, which became the Kaech'ŏn Light Railway in 1927; the Kaech'ŏn Light Railway was subsequently taken over by the Chosen Government Railway on 1 November 1932.

== Services ==
Five long-distance passenger services stop at Kaech'ŏn station: express trains between Haeju and Manp'o and between P'yŏngyang and Hŭich'ŏn, semi-express trains between Sinŭiju and Ch'ŏngjin, and a long-distance stopping train between Sinŭiju and Hŭich'ŏn. Further, there are four pairs of daily commuter trains between Sunch'ŏn and Kaech'ŏn.
