= Chongchon River =

Ch'ongch'on River
- Location of the Ch'ongch'on River

Location
- Countries: North Korea (PRK)

Physical characteristics
- Source: Rangrim Mountains
  - coordinates: 40°25′30″N 126°43′10″E
- Mouth: Yellow Sea
  - coordinates: 39°34′38″N 125°25′59″E
- Length: 217 km (135 mi)

Korean name
- Hangul: 청천강
- Hanja: 淸川江
- RR: Cheongcheongang
- MR: Ch'ŏngch'ŏn'gang

The Ch'ŏngch'ŏn is a river in North Korea having its source in the Rangrim Mountains of Chagang Province and emptying into the Yellow Sea at Sinanju. The river flows past Myohyang-san and through the city of Anju, South P'yŏngan Province. Its total length is 217 km (135 mi), and it drains a basin of 9,553 km^{2} (3,688 sq mi).

== History ==
In 612, at the Battle of Salsu (Salsu - the former name of the Cheongcheon River), the troops of the Korean kingdom of Goguryeo utterly defeated the Chinese army of the Sui Empire that had invaded Korea.

In November–December 1950, in the Battle of the Ch'ongch'on River, detachments of the Korean People's Army and Chinese volunteers won a major victory over the troops of the Americans and their allies during the Korean War.

== Important Bird Area ==
The river's estuary has been identified by BirdLife International as an 8,000 hectares (20,000 acres) Important Bird Area (IBA) because it supports significant numbers of the populations of various bird species. These include swan geese, bean geese, whooper swans, Oriental storks, black-faced spoonbills, Chinese egrets, great bustards, white-naped cranes, hooded cranes, red-crowned cranes, Far Eastern curlews and spotted greenshanks. The site includes the 800 hectares (2,000 acres) Mundok Nature Reserve.

== Hydroelectric dams ==
North Korea is building 10 new hydroelectric dams on the Chongchon River to spur rapid development.

== Incidents ==
- In 612, Goguryeo massacred the Sui army at the Battle of Salsu (Ch'ongch'on) River in the Goguryeo-Sui Wars.
- In late November 1950, in the Korean War, the Chinese army decisively defeated the UNC forces at the Battle of the Ch'ongch'on River, ensuring the continued existence of North Korea.
- U.S. Army defector Joseph T. White was reported to have drowned in the Ch'ongch'on River, according to a letter dated 22 August 1985 which had been sent to his family.

== See also ==
- Rivers of Korea
- Battle of the Ch'ongch'on River
- Chong Chon Gang
