= Kanggye Line =

Railway line in North Korea

Overview
- Native name: 강계선(江界線)
- Owner: Korean State Railway
- Locale: Chagang
- Termini: Kanggye; Rangrim
- Stations: 13

Service
- Type: Heavy rail, Regional rail

History
- Opened: 1948

Technical
- Line length: 56.8 km (35.3 mi)
- Number of tracks: Single track
- Track gauge: 762 mm (2 ft 6 in)
- Electrification: 1500 V DC Catenary
Route map
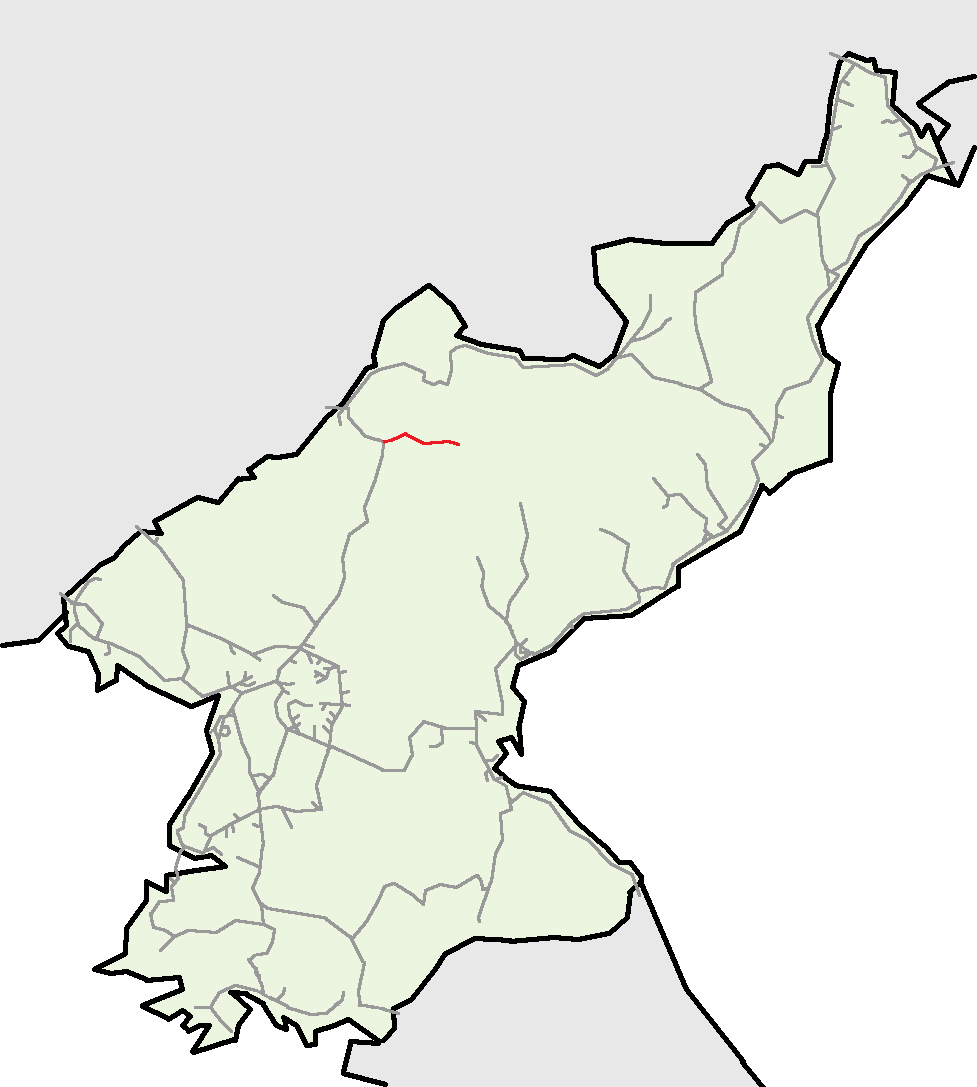

- Kanggye Line
- Hangul: 강계선
- Hanja: 江界線
- RR: Ganggyeseon
- MR: Kanggyesŏn

The Kanggye Line is an electrified narrow-gauge line of the Korean State Railway in North Korea running from Kanggye on the Manp'o Line to Rangrim, primarily hauling forest products. An interesting feature of the line is a significant switchback west of Rangrim.

== History ==
The Kanggye Line was built by the Korean State Railway in the late 1940s to aid in the construction of a hydroelectric dam on the Changjin River in the Rangrim mountains; construction of the dam had been started by the Japanese in 1937. Following an order issued in September 1999 by Kim Jong-il, electrification of the line at 1500 V DC was completed on 5 October 2000.

== Route ==
A yellow background in the "Distance" box indicates that section of the line is not electrified; a pink background indicates that section is 2 ft 6 in (762 mm) narrow gauge; an orange background indicates that section is non-electrified narrow gauge.

Distance (km)		Station Name		Former Name		
Total	S2S	Transcribed	Chosŏn'gŭl (Hanja)	Transcribed	Chosŏn'gŭl (Hanja)	Connections
0.0	0.0	Kanggye	강계 (江界)			Manp'o Line
1.8	1.8	Nammun	남문 (南門)			
~~4.9~~	~~3.1~~	Tŏkpu	덕부 (德部)			Closed.
8.9	4.0	Hyangha	향하 (香河)			
14.0	5.1	Sŭngbang	승방 (勝芳)			
17.4	3.4	Kongbuk	공북 (公北)			
21.6	4.2	O-il (1 May)	오일 (五一)			
24.0	2.4	P'yŏngri	평리 (坪里)			
28.4	4.4	Hwangp'o	황포 (黃浦)			
33.5	5.1	Simrip'yŏng	십리평 (十里坪)			
		Sangsimrip'yŏng	상십리평 (上十里坪)			Closed.
		Adŭngnyŏng	아득령 (牙得嶺)			
41.3		Upper Sinwŏn (Sangsinwŏn)	상신원 (上新院)			
46.7	5.4	Lower Sinwŏn (Hasinwŏn)	하신원 (下新院)			
56.8	10.1	Rangrim	랑림 (狼林)	Tongmun'gŏri	동문거리 (東門巨里)	Renamed 1953.
