= Kaechon Line =

Railway line in North Korea

Kaech'ŏn Line
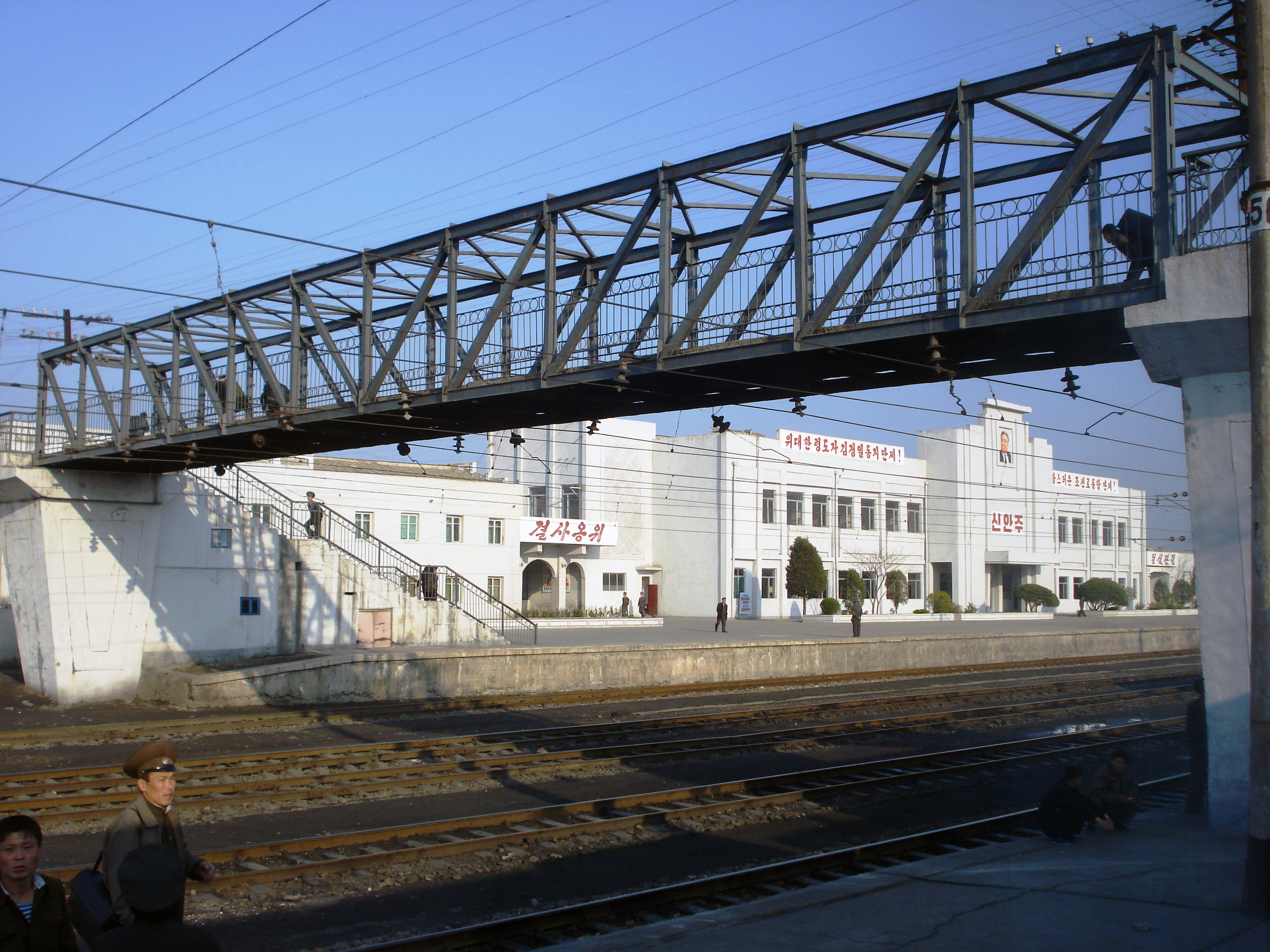
- Sinanju Ch'ŏngnyŏn station, western terminus of the Kaech'ŏn Line

Overview
- Native name: 개천선(价川線)
- Status: Operational
- Owner: Mitsui Mining Railway (1916–1927); Kaech'ŏn Light Railway (1927–1933); Chosen Government Railway (1933–1945); Korean State Railway (since 1945)
- Locale: South P'yŏngan
- Termini: Sinanju Ch'ŏngnyŏn; Kaech'ŏn
- Stations: 6

Service
- Type: Heavy rail, Passenger/Freight rail Regional rail
- Depot: Kaech'ŏn

History
- Opened: Stages between 1916–1918

Technical
- Line length: 29.5 km (18.3 mi)
- Number of tracks: Single track
- Track gauge: 1,435 mm (4 ft 8 1/2 in) standard gauge
- Old gauge: 762 mm (2 ft 6 in)
- Minimum radius: 300 m (980 ft)
- Electrification: 3000 V DC Overhead line
- Maximum incline: 14‰
Route map
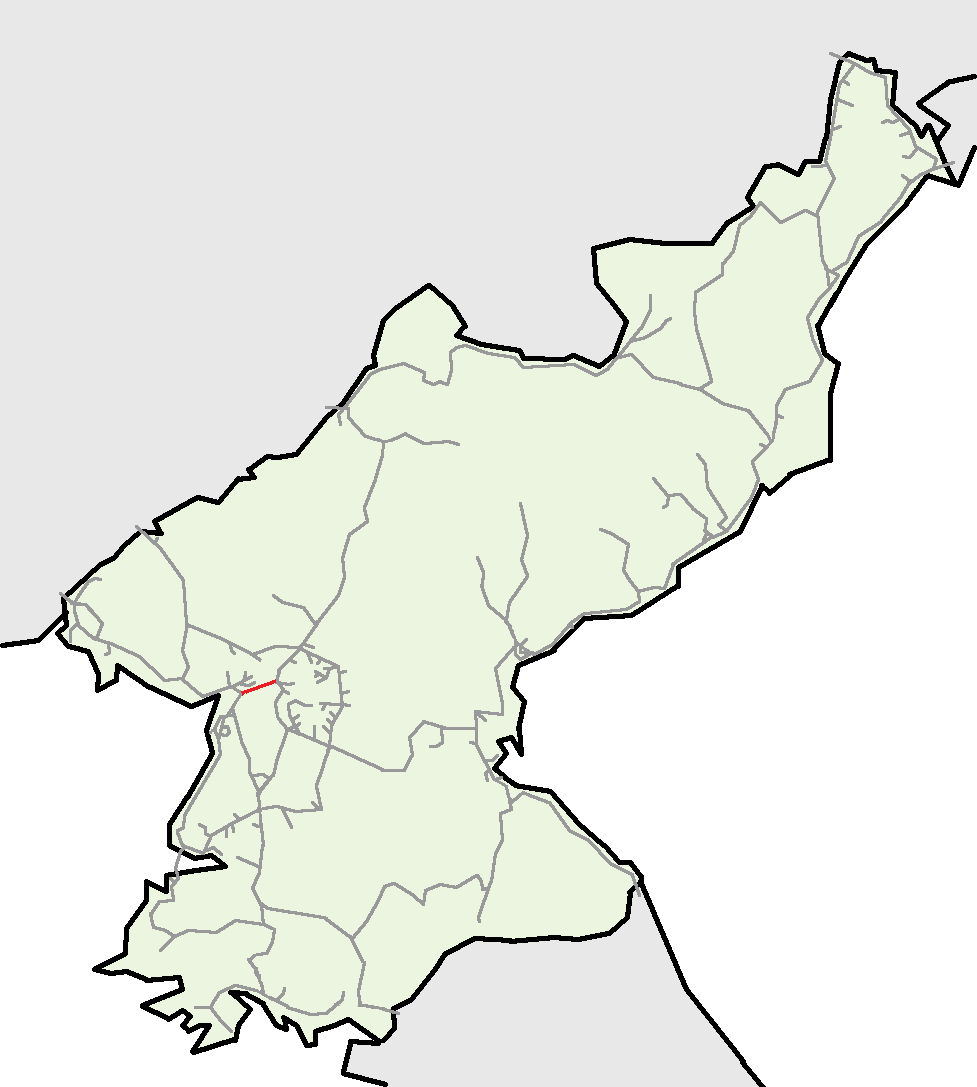

- Kaechon Line
- Hangul: 개천선
- Hanja: 价川線
- RR: Gaecheonseon
- MR: Kaech'ŏnsŏn

The Kaech'ŏn Line is an electrified standard-gauge secondary line of the Korean State Railway running from Sinanju on the P'yŏngŭi Line to Kaech'ŏn on the Manp'o Line.

The ruling grade on the line is 14‰, the minimum curve radius is 300 m (980 ft); there are 14 bridges with a total length of 619 m (2,031 ft), and there are four tunnels with a total length of 928 m (3,045 ft).

== History ==
The line was originally opened on 13 May 1916 by the Mitsui Mining Railway as a 762 mm (2 ft 6.0 in) narrow-gauge line running from Sinanju to Kaech'ŏn. It was subsequently extended from Kaech'ŏn to Ch'ŏndong, with the new section being opened on 1 December 1918. In 1927, the company was renamed Kaech'ŏn Light Railway, and then was leased to the Chosen Government Railway (Sentetsu) on 1 November 1932. Sentetsu began converting the Kaech'ŏn–Ch'ŏndong section to standard gauge, completing this work on 15 July 1933, and on 1 September 1933 the entirety of the line was officially absorbed into Sentetsu, with the Kaech'ŏn–Ch'ŏndong section becoming part of the Manp'o Line. After the partition of Korea the line was located in North Korea and became part of the Korean State Railway, which converted the remaining narrow-gauge section (Sinanju–Kaech'ŏn) to standard gauge in 1949; the regauging work began in March 1949 and was completed in eight months.

Electrification of the line was completed in February 1979, and semi-automatic train control was installed on the entirety of the line at the same time.

Date	Section	Length	Original builder
13 May 1916	Sinanju–Kaech'ŏn (narrow gauge)	29.5 km (18.3 mi)	Mitsui Mining Railway
1 December 1918	Kaech'ŏn–Ch'ŏndong (narrow gauge)	6.3 km (3.9 mi)	Mitsui Mining Railway
1 September 1925	Kaech'ŏn–Ch'ŏndong (standard gauge)	6.3 km (3.9 mi)	Chosen Government Railway
November 1949	Sinanju–Kaech'ŏn (standard gauge)	29.5 km (18.3 mi)	Korean State Railway
February 1979	Sinanju–Kaech'ŏn (electrification)	29.5 km (18.3 mi)	Korean State Railway

== Services ==
Anthracite and cement are the primary commodities shipped on the line.

The following passenger trains are known to operate on this line:

- Express trains 19/20, operating between P'yŏngyang and Hŭich'ŏn Ch'ŏngnyŏn, run on this line between Sinanju Ch'ŏngnyŏn and Kaech'ŏn;
- Semi-express trains 124-125/126-127, operating between Sinŭiju Ch'ŏngnyŏn and Ch'ŏngjin Ch'ŏngnyŏn, run on this line between Sinanju Ch'ŏngnyŏn and Kaech'ŏn;
- Local trains 250-251/252-253, operating between Sinŭiju Ch'ŏngnyŏn and Hŭich'ŏn Ch'ŏngnyŏn, run on this line between Sinanju Ch'ŏngnyŏn and Kaech'ŏn.

There are also commuter trains running along the line between Sinanju Ch'ŏngnyŏn and Kaech'ŏn.

== Route ==
A yellow background in the "Distance" box indicates that section of the line is not electrified

Distance (km)		Station name		Former name		
Total	S2S	Transcribed	Chosŏn'gŭl (Hanja)	Transcribed	Chosŏn'gŭl (Hanja)	Connections
0.0	0.0	Sinanju Ch'ŏngnyŏn	신안주청년 (新安州靑年)	Sinanju	신안주 (新安州)	P'yŏngŭi Line
6.4	6.4	Anju	안주 (安州)			
11.1	4.7	Puksongri	북송리 (北松里)			
16.3	5.2	Yŏnp'ung	연풍 (延豊)			
21.3	5.0	Unhŭngri	운흥리 (雲興里)			
29.5	8.2	Kaech'ŏn	개천 (价川)			Manp'o Line, Choyang Colliery Line
