= Kaechon =

Kaech'ŏn 개천시 Kaechon
- Municipal City

Korean transcription(s)
  - Chosŏn'gŭl: 개천시
  - Hancha: 价川市
  - McCune-Reischauer: Kaech'ŏn-si
  - Revised Romanization: Gaecheon-si
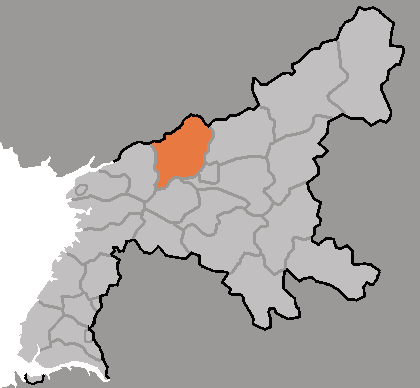
- Map of South Pyongan showing the location of Kaechon
- Interactive map of Kaech'ŏn
- Location within North Korea
- Coordinates: 39°41′55″N 125°54′22″E
- Country: North Korea
- Province: South P'yŏngan
- Administrative divisions: 26 tong, 11 ri

Area
  - Total: 738 km^{2} (285 sq mi)

Population (2008)
  - Total: 319,554
  - Density: 433/km^{2} (1,120/sq mi)
  - Dialect: P'yŏngan
- Time zone: UTC+9 (Pyongyang Time)

Kaech'ŏn or Kaechon (US: /ˈɡeɪtʃʌn/ GAY-chun, Korean: [kɛtsʰʌn]; Hangul: 개천시, Hanja: 价川市) is a city in South P'yŏngan province, North Korea.

== Geography ==
The Myohyangsan, Changansan, Ch'ŏnsŏngsan, and Ch'ŏngryongsan mountain ranges come together in Kaech'ŏn. The highest peak is Paekt'apsan. The most important rivers are the Ch'ŏngch'ŏn River and the Taedong River. The area of the city is 61% forested.

== Administrative divisions ==
Kaech'ŏn-si is divided into 26 tong (neighbourhoods) and 11 ri (villages):

- Ar'il-dong (알일동)
- Chajak-tong (자작동)
- Chŏnjin-dong (전진동)
- Choyang-dong (조양동)
- Ch'ŏlligil-dong (천리길동)
- Inhŭng-dong (인흥동)
- Kag'am-dong (각암동)
- Kangch'ŏl-dong (강철동)
- Kŏnji-dong (건지동)
- Kun'u-dong (군우동)
- Kwangbok-tong (광복동)
- Mukpang-dong (묵방동)
- Namch'ŏn-dong (남천동)
- Pongch'ŏn-dong (봉천동)
- Pug'wŏn-dong (북원동)
- Ramjŏn-dong (람전동)
- Ryongam-dong (룡암동)
- Ryongdae-dong (룡대동)
- Ryongjin-dong (룡진동)
- Ryongwŏn-dong (룡원동)
- Sambong-dong (삼봉동)
- Samp'o-dong (삼포동)
- Sinsŏng-dong (신성동)
- Sŏnam-dong (서남동)
- Sŭngch'ang-dong (승창동)
- Yaksu-dong (약수동)
- Chunhyŏng-ri (준혁리)
- Ch'ŏngryong-ri (청룡리)
- Kuŭp-ri (구읍리)
- Kwangdo-ri (광도리)
- Oedong-ri (외동리)
- Oesŏ-ri (외서리)
- Pobu-ri (보부리)
- Ryongul-li (룡운리)
- Taegang-ri (대각리)
- Tohwa-ri (도화리)
- Tongrim-ri (동림리)

== Economy ==
Water resources are abundant, and several reservoirs are located in Kaech'ŏn.

Agriculture has been extensively developed, including livestock and fruit orchards. Machining and metalworking are the dominant industries, mining has also become more prominent.

== Transportation ==
Kaech'ŏn is served by the Korean State Railway's Kaech'ŏn Line and the Manp'o Line trunk lines, as well as the Choyang Colliery Line and Chunhyŏk Line secondary lines.

== Tourism ==
Tourist sites in Kaech'ŏn include Songam Cavern, Taeripsa Temple with its 9-level stone pagoda, the fortresses of Changhamsŏng, T'osŏng, and Kosasansŏng, Namsa dolmen, and the group of dolments at Mukpangsan. There are also Yŏnpung Lake, which was constructed in 1956, and Yongwŏn Cavern, which was discovered in 1966 and is preserved as North Korea's Natural Monument No. 43.

The Kaechon Revolutionary Site is associated with Kim Il Sung's 250 Mile Journey for National Liberation. A statue was erected there on the occasion of the Day of the Sun, April 15, in 2001.

== Prison camps ==
There are two large prison camps in Kaech'ŏn, both known for very harsh conditions:

- Political Prison Camp No. 14 is a prison labour colony (kwalliso) around 20 km (12 mi) southeast of the city centre on the northwest banks of Taedong River. Shin Dong-hyuk was born in the camp, tortured there, and finally saw his mother and brother executed before he escaped.
- Re-education Camp No. 1 is a prison building complex around 2.5 km (1.6 mi) east of the city centre. Lee Soon-ok was imprisoned for six years in the camp and gave testimony before the United States Senate.

== See also ==
- List of cities in North Korea
- Transportation in North Korea
