= Manpo Line =

North Korean State Railway line

Overview
- Native name: 만포선(滿浦線)
- Owner: Mitsui Mining Railway (1918–1927); Kaech'ŏn Light Railway (1927–1933); Chosen Government Railway (1933–1945); Korean State Railway (since 1945)
- Locale: South P'yŏngan, North P'yŏngan, Chagang
- Termini: Sunch'ŏn; Manpo Ch'ŏngnyŏn
- Stations: 44

Service
- Type: Heavy rail, Regional rail

History
- Opened: Stages between 1918 - 1939

Technical
- Line length: 299.8 km (186.3 mi)
- Number of tracks: Single track
- Track gauge: 1,435 mm (4 ft 8 1/2 in) standard gauge
- Old gauge: 762 mm (2 ft 6 in)
- Minimum radius: 300 m (980 ft)
- Electrification: 3000 V DC Catenary
- Maximum incline: 24.5‰
Route map
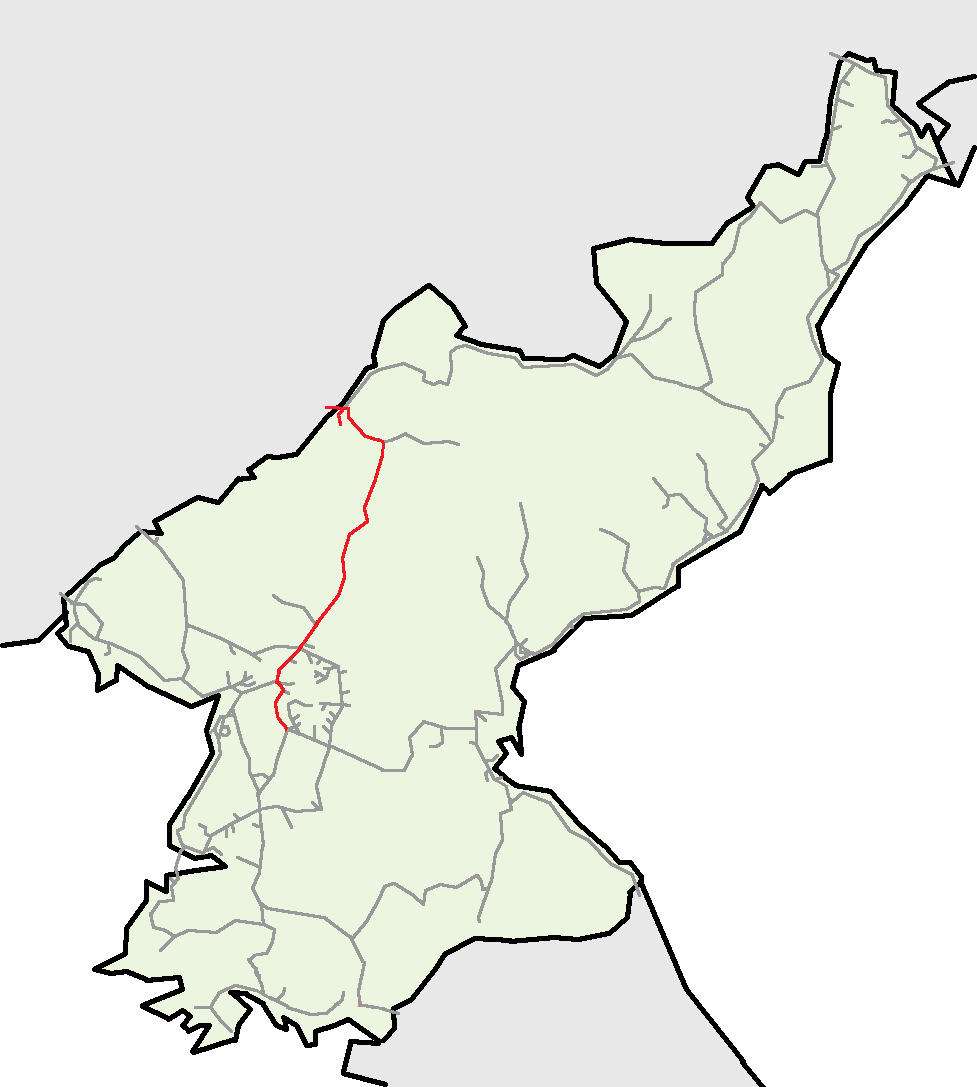

- Manpo Line
- Hangul: 만포선
- Hanja: 滿浦線
- RR: Manposeon
- MR: Manp'osŏn

The Manp'o Line is an electrified standard-gauge trunk line of the North Korean State Railway running from Sunch'ŏn on the P'yŏngra Line to Manp'o on the Pukpu Line. The line continues on from Manp'o to Ji'an, China.

== Description ==
The length of the line from Sunch'ŏn Station to Manp'o Ch'ŏngnyŏn Station is 299.8 km (186.3 mi); it is another 3.6 km (2.2 mi) to the border, making the total length from Sunch'ŏn to the border 303.4 km (188.5 mi). It also connects to the Kaech'ŏn, P'yŏngdŏk, Ch'ŏngnyŏn P'arwŏn, Unsan and Kanggye Lines. Not including Sunch'ŏn, there are 44 stations on the line; the average distance between stations is 6.8 km (4.2 mi).

The Manp'o Line runs in the northwestern part of Korea along the banks of the Ch'ŏngch'ŏn and Changja rivers. It is an important trunk line connecting ten cities, counties and districts in South P'yŏngan, North P'yŏngan and Chagang provinces. This connection is particularly important to the economies of North P'yŏngan and Chagang provinces; a great deal of coal is moved from mines along the Manp'o Line to various power plants and factories in the country.

With the exception of Sunch'ŏn station, which is administered by the P'yŏngyang Railway Bureau, the entirety of the Manp'o line from Chungp'yŏng to Manp'o is under the jurisdiction of the Kaech'ŏn Railway Bureau.

Due to the terrain it traverses, the Manp'o Line has a large number of tunnels, bridges and fills. The ruling grade is 24.5‰ and the minimum curve radius is 300 m (980 ft). There are 180 bridges totalling 7,563 m (24,813 ft) in length, and 53 tunnels totalling 18,306 m (60,059 ft) in length. 125 km (78 mi) of the line - 41% of the total length - is laid with heavy rail, and 5% of the line is laid on concrete sleepers.

== History ==
=== Pre-Liberation ===
The Kaech'ŏn–Ch'ŏndong section was originally a 762 mm (2 ft 6.0 in) narrow gauge line opened on 1 December 1918 by the Mitsui Mining Railway (미츠이 광산 전용 철도, Mich'ŭi Kwangsan Chŏn'yong Ch'ŏldo; 三井鉱山専用鉄道, Mitsui Kōzan Sen'yō Tetsudō) as an extension to its Sinanju–Kaech'ŏn mainline; in 1927 the company was renamed Kaech'ŏn Light Railway (개천 경변철도, Kaech'ŏn Kyŏngbyŏn Ch'ŏldo; 价川軽便鉄道, Kaisen Keibentetsudō), and then was leased to the Chosen Government Railway (Sentetsu) on 1 November 1932.

Sentetsu opened the 32.6 km (20.3 mi) Sunch'ŏn–Ch'ŏndong line on 1 November 1932, and at the same time began converting the Kaech'ŏn–Ch'ŏndong section to standard gauge; this work was completed on 15 July 1933. On 1 September 1933 the two lines were merged and named the Manp'o Line, which on 15 October 1933 was extended with the opening of the 24.1 km (15.0 mi) section from Kaech'ŏn to Kujang. Sentetsu subsequently extended the line several times, reaching Hŭich'ŏn on 1 November 1934 (46.8 km (29.1 mi) from Kujang), Kaego on 1 October 1935 (30.2 km (18.8 mi) from Hŭich'ŏn), Chŏnch'ŏn on 1 December 1936 (63.1 km (39.2 mi) from Kaego), and Kanggye on 1 December 1937, with a 47.5 km (29.5 mi) section of line from Chŏnch'ŏn. The final section finishing the line, 49.3 km (30.6 mi) from Kanggye to Manp'o, was opened on 1 February 1939.

After completing the entire line, Sentetsu opened the Ji'an Yalu River Border Railway Bridge on 31 July 1939, connecting the Manp'o Line to the Manchukuo National Railway's Meiji Line from Ji'an to Meihekou. New stations and branch lines along the line were also added: Ŏryong station was opened on 1 May 1941, and from there, the Ryongmun Line on 1 September of that year; Ramjŏn station was opened on 16 September 1941, and Chungsŏnggan station was opened on 1 November 1942.

=== Post-Liberation ===
After the partition of Korea following the end of the Pacific War and the liberation of Korea, the entire line was located in North Korea and was nationalised by the Provisional People’s Committee for North Korea, along with all other railways in the Soviet occupation zone, on 10 August 1946, and subsequently becoming part of the Korean State Railway after the establishment of the DPRK.

In 1948, the electrification of the section from Kaegu to Koin was completed, but this was subsequently destroyed during the Korean War. The re-electrification of the line began in 1975 with the completion of the section from Hŭich'ŏn to Koin, followed by the Kaech'ŏn - Hŭich'ŏn section in 1979; the remaining sections, from Koin to Manp'o and from Kaech'ŏn to Sunch'ŏn, were completed in 1980.

== Services ==
=== Freight ===
Freight trains serve the major industries along the line, such as textiles in Kanggye and rubber and cement plants in Manp'o. Coal and forest products are also important commodities shipped on this line. The line is also an important artery for freight traffic to and from China. Due to the large amount of coal shipped on the line, freight traffic towards Sunch'ŏn is three times greater than the amount of freight moved from Sunch'ŏn towards Manp'o.

Most of the coal traffic from Kujang towards Sunch'ŏn supplies Chagang Province with fuel; in the other direction, from Kujang towards Manp'o, coal shipped on the line is for local use for heating, and for large factories at Ch'agap'yŏng and Mun'ak on the Pukpu Line. 58% of all freight traffic between Kanggye and Manp'o is wood.

In terms of freight traffic, Kaech'ŏn and Kujang are the most important stations on the line. Kaech'ŏn is the starting point of the Kaech'ŏn Line, which connects the Manp'o line to the P'yŏngŭi Line at Sinanju, and of a branch to the large colliery at Choyang. Other important coal mines in the area are at Ramjŏn, Pongch'ŏn Colliery and at Kaech'ŏn; this area accounts for 20% of the DPRK's anthracite production. Kujang, which is the point where the Manp'o Line connects to the P'yŏngdŏk and Ch'ŏngnyŏn P'alwŏn lines, is the location of a major cement factory that supplies much of North P'yŏngan province; cement is the major outbound commodity originating at Kujang.

Hŭich'ŏn, Chŏnch'ŏn and Kanggye are major loading points for freight from areas not served by rail. Hŭich'ŏn station is where freight from Tongsin County is transferred to trains, Kanggye station for freight from Usi, Chosan, Wiwŏn, Hwap'yŏng and Changgang counties, and Chŏnch'ŏn for freight from Kopung and Ryongrim counties.

=== Passenger ===
The following passenger trains are known to operate on this line and its branches:

- Express trains 15-16/17-18, operating between Haeju Ch'ŏngnyon and Manp'o Ch'ŏngnyŏn, run on this line between Sunch'ŏn and Manp'o;
- Express trains 19/20, operating between P'yŏngyang and Hŭich'ŏn Ch'ŏngnyŏn, run on this line between Sunch'ŏn and Hŭich'ŏn;
- Semi-express trains 124-125/126-127, operating between Sinŭiju Ch'ŏngnyŏn and Ch'ongjin Ch'ŏngnyŏn, run on this line between Kaech'ŏn and Sunch'ŏn;
- Semi-express trains 134-135/136-137, operating between Manp'o Ch'ŏngnyŏn and Hamhŭng, run on this line between Manp'o and Sunch'ŏn;
- Semi-express trains 138-139/140-141, operating between Manp'o Ch'ŏngnyŏn and Changyŏn, run on this line between Manp'o and Kujang;
- Long-distance stopping trains 250/251, operating between Sinŭiju Ch'ŏngnyŏn and Hŭich'ŏn Ch'ŏngnyŏn, run on this line between Kaech'ŏn and Hŭich'ŏn.

An international passenger service from Manp'o to Ji'an exists in the form of a single passenger car attached to the daily cross-border freight train. This train is not open to use by foreigners other than ethnic Koreans from China.

Commuter trains also operate on this line between Sunch'ŏn and Kaech'ŏn (four pairs), Kanggye and Chungsŏnggan (five pairs), Hŭich'ŏn Ch'ŏngnyŏn and Koin (two pairs) and Hŭich'ŏn Ch'ŏngnyŏn and Kaego Ch'ŏngnyŏn (one pair). These trains are intended to serve local workers, and stop at all stations.

== Route ==
A yellow background in the "Distance" box indicates that section of the line is not electrified.

Distance (km)		Station name		Former name		
Total	S2S	Transcribed	Chosŏn'gŭl (Hanja)	Transcribed	Chosŏn'gŭl (Hanja)	Connections (former)
0.0	0.0	Sunch'ŏn	순천 (順川)			P'yŏngra Line
10.9	10.9	Chungp'yŏng	중평 (中坪)			
17.7	6.8	Kag'am	각암 (閣岩)			
22.1	4.4	Ryongwŏlli	룡원리 (龍源里)			
32.6	10.5	Ch'ŏndong	천동 (泉洞)			Taegak Line
38.9	6.3	Kaech'ŏn	개천 (价川)			Choyang Colliery Line, Chunhyŏk Line, Kaech'ŏn Line
46.9	8.0	Wŏlli	원리 (院里)			
49.9	3.0	Pongch'ŏn	봉천 (鳳泉)			Pongch'ŏn Colliery Line
54.0	4.1	Chajak	자작 (自作)			Kaech'ŏn Colliery Line
58.3	4.3	Ramjŏn	람전 (藍田)			
63.0	4.7	Kujang Ch'ŏngnyŏn	구장청년 (球場靑年)	Kujang	구장 (球場)	Ch'ŏngnyŏn P'arwŏn Line, P'yŏngdŏk Line, Ryong'am Line
68.5	5.5	Ŏryong	어룡 (魚龍)			Ryongmun Colliery Line
71.5	3.0	Sinhŭngdong	신흥동 (新興洞)			
81.1	9.6	Puksinhyŏn	북신현 (北薪峴)			(Unsan Line)
90.1	9.0	Myohyangsan	묘향산 (妙香山)			Branch to KWP-only station (Hyangsan Line)
103.0	12.9	Pusŏng	부성 (富成)			
109.8	6.8	Hŭich'ŏn Ch'ŏngnyŏn	희천청년 (煕川靑年)	Hŭich'ŏn	희천청년 (煕川)	Chup'yŏng Line
114.7	4.9	Ch'ŏnha	천하 (清下)			
122.9	8.2	Ch'osang	초상 (草上)			
129.3	6.4	Tongsin	동신 (東新)	Myŏngmun	명문 (明文)	
140.0	10.7	Kaego Ch'ŏngnyŏn	개고청년 (价古靑年)	Kaego	개고 (价古)	
150.8	10.8	Yŏnmŏk	연목 (椽木)			
156.6	5.8	Chinp'yŏng	진평 (津坪)	Kuhyŏn	구현 (狗峴)	
167.3	10.7	Koin	고인 (古仁)			
174.2	6.9	Riman	리만 (梨滿)			
184.3	10.1	Ch'angp'yŏng	창평 (倉坪)			
189.5	5.2	Unsong	운송 (雲松)			
195.1	5.6	Chŏnch'on	전천 (前川)	Chung'am	중암 (仲岩)	
203.1	8.0	Hwaam	화암 (花岩)	Chŏnch'on	전천 (前川)	
212.5	9.4	Ssangbangdong	쌍방동 (雙芳洞)			
217.4	4.9	Chungsŏnggan	중성간 (中城干)			
221.5	4.1	Sŏnggan	성간 (城干)	Pyŏlha	별하 (別河)	
230.5	9.0	Sinch'ŏngri	신청리 (新淸里)	Omoro	오모로 (梧毛老)	
237.6	7.1	Puji	부지 (富只)			
243.9	6.3	Kongin	공인 (公仁)			
250.6	6.7	Kanggye	강계 (江界)			Kanggye Line
260.9	10.3	Kokha	곡하 (曲河)			
269.8	8.9	Ssangbu	쌍부 (雙富)			
276.9	7.1	Anch'an	안찬 (安贊)			
286.0	9.1	Sijung	시중 (時中)			
291.9	5.9	Kŏnha	건하 (乾下)	Oegwi	외귀 (外貴)	
299.8	7.9	Manp'o Ch'ŏngnyŏn	만포청년 (滿浦靑年)	Manp'o	만포 (滿浦)	Pukpu Line, Unha Line
		Manp'o Yalu River Bridge	만포압록강교량 (満浦鴨緑江橋梁)			DPRK−PRC border
		Ji'an, China	集安	Ji'an	辑安 (輯安)	CR Meiji Railway
