= South Pyongan Province =

Province of North Korea

Coordinates: 39.51°N 126.29°E

South Pyongan Province 평안남도
- Province

Korean transcription(s)
  - Chŏsŏn'gŭl: 평안남도
  - Hancha: 平安南道
  - McCune-Reischauer: P'yŏngannam-do
  - Revised Romanization: Pyeongannam-do
- Country: North Korea
- Region: Kwanso
- Capital: Pyongsong
- Subdivisions: 5 cities; 19 counties

Government
  - Provincial Party Committee Chief Secretary: Lee Gyeong-cheol (WPK)
  - Provincial People's Committee Chairman: Ri Song Pom

Area
  - Total: 12,330 km^{2} (4,760 sq mi)

Population (2008)
  - Total: 4,051,696
  - Density: 328.6/km^{2} (851.1/sq mi)
- Time zone: UTC+9 (Pyongyang Time)
- Dialect: P'yŏngan

South Pyongan Province (Korean: 평안남도; MR: Phyŏngannamdo; IPA: [pʰjʌŋanːamdo]) is a province of North Korea. The province was formed in 1896 from the southern half of the former Pyongan Province, remained a province of Korea until 1945, then became a province of North Korea. Its capital is Pyongsong.

== Geography ==
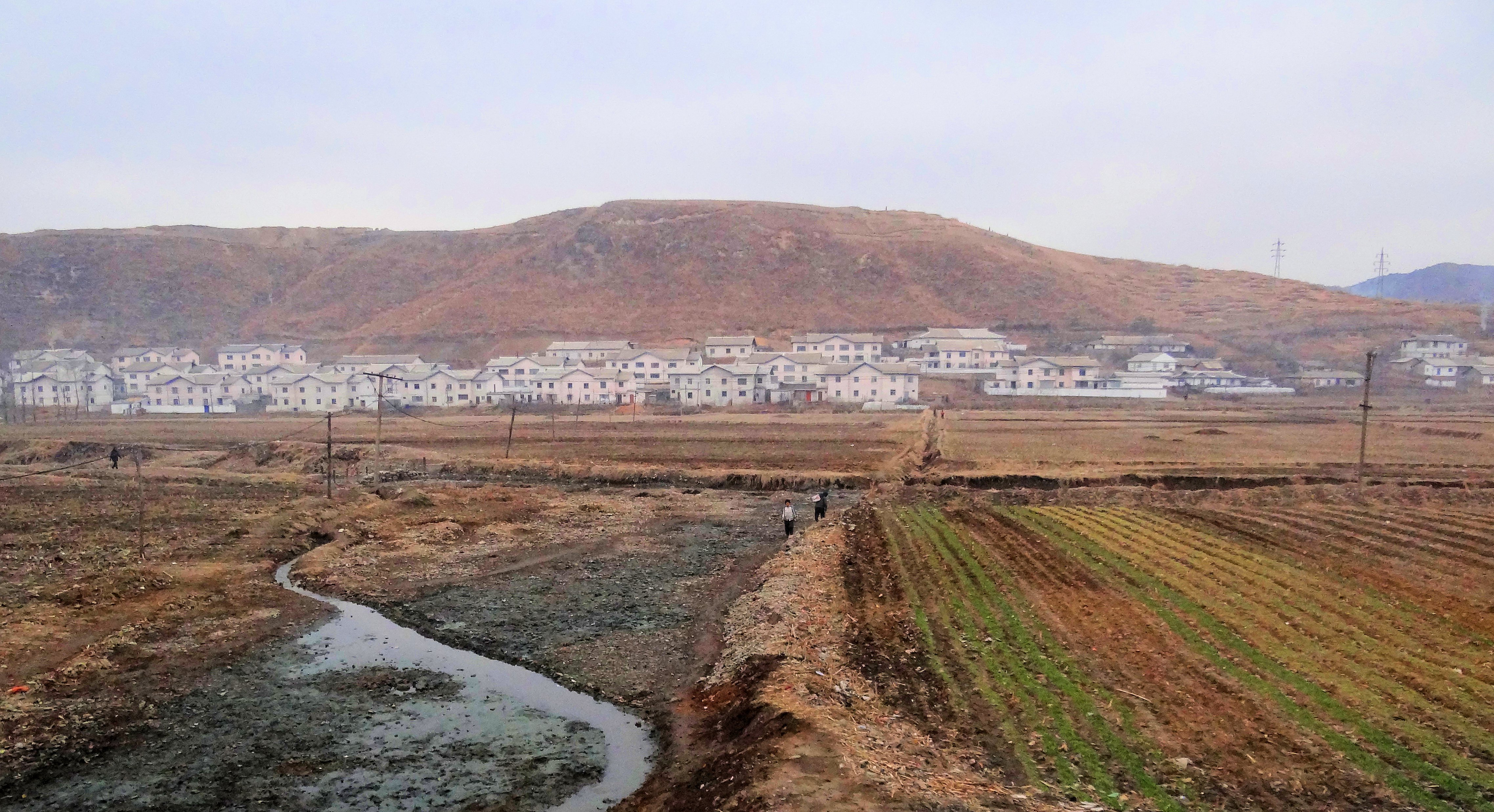
A typical settlement along the main road in South Pyongan Province near Pyongsong.

The province is bordered by North Pyongan and Chagang Provinces to the north, South Hamgyong and Kangwon Provinces to the east and southeast and North Hwanghae Province and Pyongyang to the south. The Yellow Sea and Korea Bay are located to the west.

== Administrative divisions ==
South P'yŏngan is divided into 1 special city (tŭkpyŏlsi); 5 cities (si); 16 counties (kun); and 3 districts (1 ku and 2 chigu).

Its administrative divisions are:

=== Cities ===
- Nampo Special City (남포특별시/南浦特別市; created in 2010)
- Pyongsong (평성시/平城市; the provincial capital, established December 1969)
- Anju (안주시/安州市; established August 1987)
- Kaechon (개천시/价川市; established August 1990)
- Sunchon-si (순천시/順川市; established October 1983)
- Tokchon (덕천시/德川市; established June 1986)

=== Counties ===
- Chungsan County (증산군/甑山郡)
- Hoechang County (회창군/檜倉郡)
- Maengsan County (맹산군/孟山郡)
- Mundok County (문덕군/文德郡)
- Nyongwon County (녕원군/寧遠郡)
- Onchon County (온천군/溫泉郡)
- Pukchang County (북창군/北倉郡)
- Pyongwon County (평원군/平原郡)
- Ryonggang County (룡강군/龍岡郡)
- Sinyang County (신양군/新陽郡)
- Songchon County (성천군/成川郡)
- Sukchon County (숙천군/肅川郡)
- Taehung County (대흥군/大興郡)
- Taedong County (대동군/大同郡)
- Unsan County (은산군/殷山郡)
- Yangdok County (양덕군/陽德郡)

=== Districts ===
- Chongnam (청남구/清南區)
- Tukchang (득장지구/得將地區)
- Ungok (운곡지구/雲谷地區)

The below former counties of South Pyongan were merged with Nampo in 2004 and are administered as part of that city:

- Chollima-guyok (천리마군/千里馬郡)
- Kangso-guyok (강서군/江西郡)
- Ryonggang County (룡강군/龍岡郡)
- Taean-guyok-gun (대안군/大安郡)

In 2010 the following county was merged with Nampo:

- Onchon County (온천군/溫泉郡)

== Gallery ==
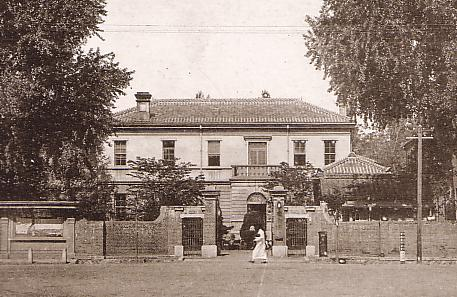
South Pyongan Provincial Office during Korea under Japanese rule's period,ruling the province as Heian'nan-dō.

== See also ==
- Geography of North Korea
