= Toktong station =

Railway station in North Korea

Tŏktong 덕동

Korean name
- Hangul: 덕동역
- Hanja: 德洞驛
- Revised Romanization: Deokdong-yeok
- McCune–Reischauer: Tŏktong-yŏk

General information
- Location: Taedae-dong, Waudo-guyŏk, Namp'o-tŭkpyŏlsi; North Korea
- Coordinates: 38.7455°N 125.3317°E
- Owner: Korean State Railway
- Platforms: 1
- Tracks: 2

History
- Opened: July 1938
- Original company: Chosen P'yŏngan Railway

Services
Preceding station	Korean State Railway	Following station
Sillyŏngri towards P'yŏngnam Onch'ŏn	P'yŏngnam Line	Sinnamp'o towards Namp'o
Location

Tŏktong station is a railway station in Taedae-dong, Waudo-guyŏk, Namp'o Special City, North Korea on the P'yŏngnam Line of the Korean State Railway.

== History ==
The station was opened by the Chosen P'yŏngan Railway (Japanese: 朝鮮平安鉄道, Chōsen Heian Tetsudō; Korean: 조선평안철도, Chosŏn P'yŏngan Ch'ŏldo) in July 1938 as part of a 34.7 km (21.6 mi)-long line from Namp'o to P'yŏngnam Onch'ŏn.

== Services ==
Regional passenger trains 226-227/228-229 between Tŏkch'ŏn on the P'yŏngdŏk Line and P'yŏngnam Onch'ŏn, regional trains 225/230 between Pot'onggang and P'yŏngnam Onch'ŏn, and local trains 361/362 between Namp'o on the P'yŏngnam Line and Ch'ŏlgwang on the Ŭllyul Line via the Sŏhae Kammun Line, use this station.
