= Rosang station =

Railway station in North Korea

Rosang 로상

Korean name
- Hangul: 로상역
- Hanja: 路上驛
- Revised Romanization: Rosang-yeok
- McCune–Reischauer: Rosang-yŏk

General information
- Location: Kwisŏng-rodongjagu, Onch'ŏn-gun, Namp'o-tŭkpyŏlsi; North Korea
- Coordinates: 38.8283°N 125.1985°E
- Owner: Korean State Railway
- Platforms: 3
- Tracks: 2

History
- Opened: July 1938
- Original company: Chosen P'yŏngan Railway

Services
Preceding station	Korean State Railway	Following station
Kwisŏng towards P'yŏngnam Onch'ŏn	P'yŏngnam Line	Hwado towards Namp'o
Location

Rosang station is a railway station in Kwisŏng-rodongjagu, Onch'ŏn county, Namp'o Special City, North Korea on the P'yŏngnam Line of the Korean State Railway.

== History ==
The station was opened by the Chosen P'yŏngan Railway (Japanese: 朝鮮平安鉄道, Chōsen Heian Tetsudō; Korean: 조선평안철도, Chosŏn P'yŏngan Ch'ŏlto) in July 1938 as part of a 34.7 km (21.6 mi)-long line from Namp'o to P'yŏngnam Onch'ŏn.
