= Tonggwangryang station =

Railway station in North Korea

East Kwangryang 동광량

Korean name
- Hangul: 동광량역
- Hanja: 東廣梁驛
- Revised Romanization: Donggwangnyang-yeok
- McCune–Reischauer: Tonggwangryang-yŏk

General information
- Location: Porim-rodongjagu, Onch'ŏn-gun, Namp'o-tŭkpyŏlsi; North Korea
- Coordinates: 38.7922°N 125.2597°E
- Owner: Korean State Railway
- Platforms: 1
- Tracks: 2 + 1 siding

History
- Opened: July 1938
- Original company: Chosen P'yŏngan Railway

Services
Preceding station	Korean State Railway	Following station
West Kwangryang towards P'yŏngnam Onch'ŏn	P'yŏngnam Line	Sillyŏngri towards Namp'o
Location

Tonggwangryang station, or East Kwangryang station is a railway station in Porim-rodongjagu, Onch'ŏn-gun, Namp'o Special City, North Korea on the P'yŏngnam Line of the Korean State Railway.

== History ==
The station was opened by the Chosen P'yŏngan Railway (Japanese: 朝鮮平安鉄道, Chōsen Heian Tetsudō; Korean: 조선평안철도, Chosŏn P'yŏngan Ch'ŏldo) in July 1938 as part of a 34.7 km (21.6 mi)-long line from Namp'o to P'yŏngnam Onch'ŏn.
