= Hwado station =

Railway station in North Korea

Hwado 화도

Korean name
- Hangul: 화도역
- Hanja: 花島驛
- Revised Romanization: Hwado-yeok
- McCune–Reischauer: Hwado-yŏk

General information
- Location: Hwado-ri, Onch'ŏn-gun, Namp'o-tŭkpyŏlsi; North Korea
- Coordinates: 38.8216°N 125.2183°E
- Owner: Korean State Railway
- Platforms: 1
- Tracks: 2

History
- Opened: July 1938
- Original company: Chosen P'yŏngan Railway

Services
| Preceding station | Korean State Railway | Following station |
|---|---|---|
| Rosang towards P'yŏngnam Onch'ŏn | P'yŏngnam Line | West Kwangryang towards Namp'o |
Location

Hwado station is a railway station in Hwado-ri, Onch'ŏn county, Namp'o Special City, North Korea on the P'yŏngnam Line of the Korean State Railway.

== History ==
The station was opened by the Chosen P'yŏngan Railway (Japanese: 朝鮮平安鉄道, Chōsen Heian Tetsudō; Korean: 조선평안철도, Chosŏn P'yŏngan Ch'ŏldo) in July 1938 as part of a 34.7 km (21.6 mi)-long line from Namp'o to P'yŏngnam Onch'ŏn.
