= Ryongwol station =

Railway station in North Korea

Ryongwŏl 룡월

Korean name
- Hangul: 룡월역
- Hanja: 龍月驛
- Revised Romanization: Husan-yeok
- McCune–Reischauer: Husan-yŏk

General information
- Location: Ryongwŏl-li, Onch'ŏn-gun, South P'yŏngan; North Korea
- Coordinates: 38.8537°N 125.4244°E
- Owner: Korean State Railway
- Platforms: 1
- Tracks: 2

History
- Original company: Chosen Government Railway

Services
Preceding station	Korean State Railway	Following station
Mayŏng Terminus	Ryonggang Line	Husan towards Ryonggang
Location

Ryongwŏl station is a small passenger-only railway station in Ryongwŏl-li, Onch'ŏn county, South P'yŏngan province, North Korea, on the Ryonggang Line of the Korean State Railway. A local passenger train, 733/734, operating between Mayŏng on the Ryonggang Line and Kangsŏ on the P'yŏngnam Line, stops at this station.
