= Ryongho station =

Railway station in North Korea

Ryonggho 룡호

Korean name
- Hangul: 룡호역
- Hanja: 龍湖驛
- Revised Romanization: Ryongho-yeok
- McCune–Reischauer: Ryongho-yŏk

General information
- Location: Ryongho-ri, Ryonggang, South P'yŏngan; North Korea
- Coordinates: 38.8537°N 125.4244°E
- Owner: Korean State Railway
- Platforms: 1
- Tracks: 2

History
- Original company: Chosen Government Railway

Services
Preceding station	Korean State Railway	Following station
Husan towards Mayŏng	Ryonggang Line	Ryonggang Terminus
Location

Ryongho station is a small railway station in Ryongho-ri, Ryonggang county, South P'yŏngan province, North Korea, on the Ryonggang Line of the Korean State Railway. A local passenger train, 733/734, operating between Mayŏng on the Ryonggang Line and Kangsŏ on the P'yŏngnam Line, stops at this station.
