= Sillyongri station =

Railway station in North Korea

Sillyŏngri 신령리

Korean name
- Hangul: 신령리역
- Hanja: 新寧里驛
- Revised Romanization: Sillyeongni-yeok
- McCune–Reischauer: Sillyŏngri-yŏk

General information
- Location: Sillyŏng-ri, Waudo-guyŏk, Namp'o-tŭkpyŏlsi; North Korea
- Coordinates: 38.7625°N 125.2966°E
- Owner: Korean State Railway
- Platforms: 1
- Tracks: 3

History
- Opened: July 1938
- Former names: P'yŏngnam Sindŏk station Chosŏn'gŭl: 평남신덕역; Hanja: 平南新徳駅
- Original company: Chosen P'yŏngan Railway

Services
Preceding station	Korean State Railway	Following station
East Kwangryang towards P'yŏngnam Onch'ŏn	P'yŏngnam Line	Tŏktong towards Namp'o
Terminus	Sŏhae Kammun Line	Sŏhae Kammun towards Ch'ŏlgwang
Location

Sillyŏngri station is a railway station in Sillyŏng-ri, Waudo-guyŏk, Namp'o Special City, North Korea on the P'yŏngnam Line of the Korean State Railway; it is also the northern end of the Sŏhae Kammun Line.

== History ==
Originally called P'yŏngnam Sindŏk station and later renamed Sillyŏngri station, it was opened by the Chosen P'yŏngan Railway (Japanese: 朝鮮平安鉄道, Chōsen Heian Tetsudō; Korean: 조선평안철도, Chosŏn P'yŏngan Ch'ŏldo) in July 1938 as part of a 34.7 km (21.6 mi)-long line from Namp'o to P'yŏngnam Onch'ŏn.

== Services ==
Regional passenger trains 226-227/228-229 between Tŏkch'ŏn on the P'yŏngdŏk Line and P'yŏngnam Onch'ŏn, regional trains 225/230 between Pot'onggang and P'yŏngnam Onch'ŏn, and local trains 361/362 between Namp'o on the P'yŏngnam Line and Ch'ŏlgwang on the Ŭllyul Line via the Sŏhae Kammun Line, use this station.
