= Husan station =

Railway station in North Korea

Husan 후산

Korean name
- Hangul: 후산역
- Hanja: 後山驛
- Revised Romanization: Husan-yeok
- McCune–Reischauer: Husan-yŏk

General information
- Location: Husal-li, Ryonggang, South P'yŏngan; North Korea
- Coordinates: 38.8537°N 125.4244°E
- Owner: Korean State Railway
- Platforms: 1
- Tracks: 2

History
- Original company: Chosen Government Railway

Services
Preceding station	Korean State Railway	Following station
Ryongwŏl towards Mayŏng	Ryonggang Line	Ryongho towards Ryonggang
Terminus	Husan Line	Yangmak Terminus
Location

Husan station is a small passenger-only railway station in Husal-li, Ryonggang county, South P'yŏngan province, North Korea, on the Ryonggang Line of the Korean State Railway. It is also the start of the freight-only Husan Line to Yangmak.

A local passenger train, 733/734, operating between Mayŏng on the Ryonggang Line and Kangsŏ on the P'yŏngnam Line, stops at this station.
