= Pyongyanghwajon Line =

Railway line in North Korea

P'yŏngyang Thermal Power Plant Line

Overview
- Native name: 평양화전선 (平壤火電線)
- Status: Operational
- Owner: Chosen Government Railway (1944–1945); Korean State Railway (since 1945)
- Locale: Pot'onggang-guyŏk and P'yŏngch'ŏn-guyŏk, P'yŏngyang
- Termini: Pot'onggang; P'yŏngch'ŏn
- Stations: 3

Service
- Type: Heavy rail, Freight rail

History
- Opened: 21 March 1944 (Pot'onggang–P'yŏngch'ŏn); 1961 (P'yŏngyang Choch'ajang–P'yŏngyanghwajŏn)

Technical
- Line length: 3.7 km (2.3 mi)
- Number of tracks: Single track
- Track gauge: 1,435 mm (4 ft 8 1/2 in) standard gauge
- Electrification: 3000 V DC Catenary

- Pyongyanghwajon Line
- Hangul: 평양화전선
- Hanja: 平壤火電線
- RR: Pyeongyanghwajeonseon
- MR: P'yŏngyanghwajŏnsŏn

The P'yŏngyanghwajŏn Line, or P'yŏngyang Thermal Power Plant Line, is an electrified freight-only railway line of the Korean State Railway in Pot'onggang-guyŏk and P'yŏngch'ŏn-guyŏk, P'yŏngyang, North Korea, running from Pot'onggang on the P'yŏngnam Line to P'yŏngch'ŏn, with a branch to the P'yŏngyang Thermal Power Plant (P'yŏngyanghwajŏn), from which the line gets its name).

== History ==
The original line between Pot'onggang Station to P'yŏngch'ŏn via the P'yŏngyang Marshalling Yard was opened by the Chosen Government Railway on 21 March 1944. This was extended by the Korean State Railway in 1961, when construction of the P'yŏngyang Thermal Power Plant began. The line was given its current name at that time.

== Services ==
The line serves a number of industries, notably the Taedonggang Battery Factory, the 26 March Electric Wire Factory, and the P'yŏngyang Thermal Power Plant in Saemaŭl-dong, P'yŏngch'ŏn-guyŏk, the Pot'onggang Organic Fertiliser Factory in Chŏngpy'ŏng-dong, P'yŏngch'ŏn-guyŏk, adjacent to the marshalling yard, and the Posok Korean Foreign Trade Company.

== Route ==
A yellow background in the "Distance" box indicates that section of the line is not electrified.

| Distance (km) | | Station Name | | |
| Total | S2S | Transcribed | Chosŏn'gŭl (Hanja) | Connections |
|---|---|---|---|---|
| 0.0 | 0.0 | Pot'onggang | 보통강 (普通江) | P'yŏngnam Line ● Metro Hyŏksin Line Kŏn'guk Station ● Tram Line 1 |
| 3.7 | 3.7 | P'yŏngyang Choch'ajang | 평양조차장 (平壤操車場) | branch to P'yŏngyang Thermal Power Plant; Taedonggang Battery Factory; 26 March Electric Wire Factory |
| 5.7 | 2.0 | P'yŏngch'ŏn | 평천 (平川) | Pot'onggang Organic Fertiliser Factory; Posok Korean Foreign Trade Company |
