= Pyongyang Chochajang =

Railway station in Pyongyang, North Korea

P'yŏngyang marshalling yard 평양조차장

Korean name
- Hangul: 평양조차장
- Hanja: 平壤操車場
- Revised Romanization: Pyeongyang Jochajang
- McCune–Reischauer: P'yŏngyang Choch'ajang

General information
- Location: Chongp'yŏng-dong, P'yŏngch'ŏn-guyŏk, P'yŏngyang; North Korea
- Coordinates: 39°01′52″N 125°42′35″E
- Owner: Korean State Railway
- Tracks: 5

History
- Opened: 21 March 1944
- Original company: Chosen Government Railway

Services
Preceding station	Korean State Railway	Following station
Pot'onggang Terminus	P'yŏngyanghwajŏn Line	P'yŏngch'ŏn Terminus
Terminus	P'yŏngyanghwajŏn Line (power plant branch)	P'yŏngyang Thermal Power Plant Terminus
Location

P'yongyang Choch'ajang is a marshalling yard in Chŏngp'yŏng-dong, P'yŏngch'ŏn-guyŏk, P'yŏngyang, North Korea, on the P'yŏngyanghwajŏn Line of the Korean State Railway, it is the starting point of a branch to the P'yŏngyang Thermal Power Plant.

== History ==
The marshalling yard was opened by the Chosen Government Railway at the same time as Pot'onggang Station on the P'yŏngnam Line, opened on 21 March 1944. The branch from the marshalling yard to the power plant was opened in 1961.

The yard has five tracks, along with a spur track serving the Taedonggang Battery Factory in Saemaŭl-dong, P'yŏngch'ŏn-guyŏk.
