= Sinnampo station =

Railway station in North Korea

Sinnamp'o 신남포

Korean name
- Hangul: 신남포역
- Hanja: 新南浦驛
- Revised Romanization: Sinnampo-yeok
- McCune–Reischauer: Sinnamp'o-yŏk

General information
- Location: Hanggu-guyŏk, Namp'o-tŭkpyŏlsi; North Korea
- Coordinates: 38.7555°N 125.3968°E
- Owner: Korean State Railway
- Platforms: 1
- Tracks: 5

History
- Opened: after 1953

Services
Preceding station	Korean State Railway	Following station
Kalch'ŏn towards P'yŏngyang	P'yŏngnam Line	Namp'o Terminus
Terminus	Namp'o Port Line	Namp'ohang Terminus
Location

Sinnamp'o station is a freight-only railway station in Hanggu-guyŏk, Namp'o Special City, North Korea, on the P'yŏngnam Line of the Korean State Railway; it is also the starting point of the Namp'ohang Line.

The station was opened by the Korean State Railway after the end of the Korean War, at the same time as the Nampo'hang Line, to serve glass factories and shipbuilders located in the area. This station also serves the Ch'ŏnji Lubricant Factory and the Pyonghwa Motors factory.
