= Kalchon station =

Railway station in North Korea

Kalch'ŏn 갈천

Korean name
- Hangul: 갈천역
- Hanja: 葛川驛
- Revised Romanization: Galcheon-yeok
- McCune–Reischauer: Kalch'ŏn-yŏk

General information
- Location: Kalch'ŏl-li, Hanggu-guyŏk, Namp'o-tŭkpyŏlsi; North Korea
- Coordinates: 38.7958°N 125.4206°E
- Owner: Korean State Railway
- Platforms: 1
- Tracks: 2

History
- Opened: 1 May 1924
- Original company: Chosen Government Railway

Services
Preceding station	Korean State Railway	Following station
Ryonggang towards P'yŏngyang	P'yŏngnam Line	Sinnamp'o towards Namp'o
Location

Kalch'ŏn station is a railway station in Kalch'ŏl-li, Hanggu-guyŏk, Namp'o Special City, North Korea, on the P'yŏngnam Line of the Korean State Railway.

The station was opened by the Chosen Government Railway on 1 May 1924.
