= Sosa station (disambiguation) =

Sosa station is a station on the Seoul Subway Line 1 & Seohae Line in South Korea.

Sosa station may also refer to:

- Sōsa Station, a station on the Miki line in Kakogawa, Japan
- Sŏsi or Sosa Station (North Korea), a station on the Chongnam and Sohae lines
