= Tojiri station =

Railway station in North Korea

Tojiri 도지리

Korean name
- Hangul: 도지리역
- Hanja: 島智里驛
- Revised Romanization: Dojiri-yeok
- McCune–Reischauer: Tojiri-yŏk

General information
- Location: Toji-ri, Hanggu-guyŏk, Namp'o-tŭkpyŏlsi; North Korea
- Owner: Korean State Railway
- Platforms: 1
- Tracks: 3

History
- Opened: 1910s

Services
Preceding station	Korean State Railway	Following station
Namp'o Terminus	Tojiri Line	Terminus

Tojiri station is a railway station in Toji-ri, Hanggu-guyŏk, Namp'o Special City, North Korea. It is the terminus of the Tojiri Line from Namp'o on the P'yŏngnam Line of the Korean State Railway.

== Services ==
This station was built to serve the Namp'o Smelting Complex, which processed nonferrous metals, shipping gold, zinc, coarse and refined copper, copper wire and chemical fertilisers. It received ore and concentrates from mines at Taedae-ri and Suan.
