= Taepyong station =

Railway station in Pyongyang, North Korea

Coordinates: 38°58′50″N 125°36′51″E

Taep'yŏng 대평

Korean name
- Hangul: 대평역
- Hanja: 大平驛
- Revised Romanization: Daepyeong-yeok
- McCune–Reischauer: Taep'yŏng-yŏk

General information
- Location: Taep'yŏng-ri, Man'gyŏngdae-guyŏk, P'yŏngyang; North Korea
- Owner: Korean State Railway
- Tracks: 1

History
- Opened: 16 October 1910
- Original company: Chosen Government Railway

Services
Preceding station	Korean State Railway	Following station
Ch'ilgol towards P'yŏngyang	P'yŏngnam Line	Kangsŏn towards Namp'o
Location

Taep'yŏng station is railway station in Taep'yŏng-ri, Man'gyŏngdae-guyŏk, P'yŏngyang, North Korea, on the P'yŏngnam Line of the Korean State Railway. The station is on the single-track mainline, serving as a halt for passenger trains.

The station was opened, along with the rest of the mainline of the P'yŏngnam Line, on 16 October 1910 by the Chosen Government Railway.
