= Nampohang Line =

Railway in Namp'o, North Korea

Namp'o Port Line

Overview
- Native name: 남포항선 (南浦港線)
- Status: Operational
- Owner: Korean State Railway
- Locale: Namp'o-tŭkp'yŏlsi
- Termini: Sinnamp'o; Namp'ohang
- Stations: 2

Service
- Type: Heavy rail, Freight rail
- Operator: Korean State Railway

History
- Opened: after 1953

Technical
- Line length: 8.8 km (5.5 mi)
- Number of tracks: Single track
- Track gauge: 1,435 mm (4 ft 8 1/2 in) standard gauge
- Electrification: 3000 V DC Catenary

- Nampohang Line
- Hangul: 남포항선
- Hanja: 南浦港線
- RR: Nampohangseon
- MR: Namp'ohangsŏn

The Namp'ohang Line, or Namp'o Port Line, is an electrified secondary railway line of the Korean State Railway in Namp'o Special City, North Korea, from Sinnamp'o on the P'yŏngnam Line to Namp'ohang.

== History ==
The line was opened by the Korean State Railway after the end of the Korean War to serve glass factories and shipbuilders located in the area.

== Services ==
This line serves Namp'o Port, where the Namp'o Shipyard is located; the shipyard builds marine vessels of various sizes. Steel and other products are received by rail. Also located on this line is the Namp'o Glass Bottle Factory, a petroleum storage tank farm, the Ch'ŏnji Lubricant Factory, and the Pyeonghwa Motors factory.

== Route ==
A yellow background in the "Distance" box indicates that section of the line is not electrified.

Distance (km)		Station Name		Former Name		
Total	S2S	Transcribed	Chosŏn'gŭl (Hanja)	Transcribed	Chosŏn'gŭl (Hanja)	Connections
0.0	0.0	Sinnamp'o	신남포 (新南浦)			P'yŏngnam Line
~8.8	~8.8	Nampohang	남포항 (南浦港)			
