= West Chōsen Central Railway =

Japanese company in colonial Korea

Overview
- Native name: 서선중앙철도 (Seoseon Jung'ang Cheoldo) 西鮮中央鉄道 (Sōsen Chūō Tetsudō)

The West Chōsen Central Railway (Japanese: 西鮮中央鉄道, Sōsen Chūō Tetsudō; Korean: 서선중앙철도, Seoseon Jung'ang Cheoldo), was a privately owned railway company in Japanese-occupied Korea.

== History ==
The West Chōsen Central Railway opened its lines from Seunghori to Jangsang in several staged between 1939 and 1945. The first section, 29.6 km (18.4 mi) from Seunghori to Seongneum, was opened on 29 June 1939, followed five months later by an 8.5 km (5.3 mi) extension to Pyeongnam Gangdong.

On 1 October 1941 a second line was opened, isolated from the first, made up of a 36.1 km (22.4 mi) mainline running from Sinseongcheon to Bukchang with a 4.4 km (2.7 mi) branchline, the Jaedong Line, from Gujeong to Jaedong. The two sections of mainline remained isolated from each other until 18 September 1942, when the gap between Pyeongnam Gangdong and Sinseongcheon, a distance of 30.3 km (18.8 mi) was closed. The newly built line did not long remain part of the West Chōsen railway, as on 1 April 1944 the line from Seunghori as far as Sinseongcheon was nationalised by the Chosen Government Railway (Sentetsu) and incorporated into the Pyeongyang Colliery Line.

The West Chōsen Central Railway nevertheless continued expanding its truncated mainline, called the Seoseon Line, receiving approval from the Railway Bureau on 21 June 1940 to extend its line to Deokcheon and thence onwards to the Jangsang coal fields, in order to transport coal from the mines in the area opened in 1938 by the Chosen Anthracite Company. The first of these extensions was a 5.9 km (3.7 mi) stretch from Bukchang to Okcheon opened on 28 December 1944, which was followed by a second extension, 6.4 km (4.0 mi) to Jangan, opened on 25 May 1945, reaching Deokcheon a few months later.

The West Chōsen Central Railway planned its Deokbal Line (덕발선, 徳八線) line to run from Deokcheon to Gujang via Jangsangri, to connect there with Sentetsu's Manpo Line. However, the terrain proved too difficult, and, after adding a signal station at Hyangjang between Hyangwon and Jangsangni, construction on the current alignment of the line to Gujang began. However, this wasn't completed before war's end; it was only after the end of the Korean War that the connection to Gujang and the Manpo Line was finally made.

After the end of the Pacific War and subsequent partition of Korea, the line was within the territory of the DPRK, and was nationalised by the Provisional People’s Committee for North Korea along with all other railways in the Soviet zone of occupation on 10 August 1946, becoming part of the Korean State Railway. The line is now part of the P'yŏngdŏk Line, with the Hyangjang–Jangsang section now forming the Changsang Line.

Line	Section	Opened	Notes
Seoseon Line	Seunghori–Seongneum	29 June 1939	to Sentetsu 1 April 1944
Seoseon Line	Seongneum–Pyeongnam Gangdong	November 1939	to Sentetsu 1 April 1944
Seoseon Line	Sinseongcheon–Bukchang	1 October 1941	
Jaedong Line	Gujeong–Jaedong	1 October 1941	
Seoseon Line	Pyeongnam Gangdong–Sinseongcheon	18 September 1942	to Sentetsu 1 April 1944
Seoseon Line	Bukchang–Okcheon	28 December 1944	
Seoseon Line	Okcheon–Jangan	25 May 1945	
Seoseon Line	Jangan–Deokcheon	1945	
Deokbal Line	Deokcheon–Jangsangri	1945	

== Operations ==
In addition to trains on its own lines, the West Chōsen Central Railway also operated a train in conjunction with the Chōsen Pyeongan Railway, from Deokcheon to Yonggang Oncheon, terminus of the latter's Oncheon Line.

== Rolling stock ==
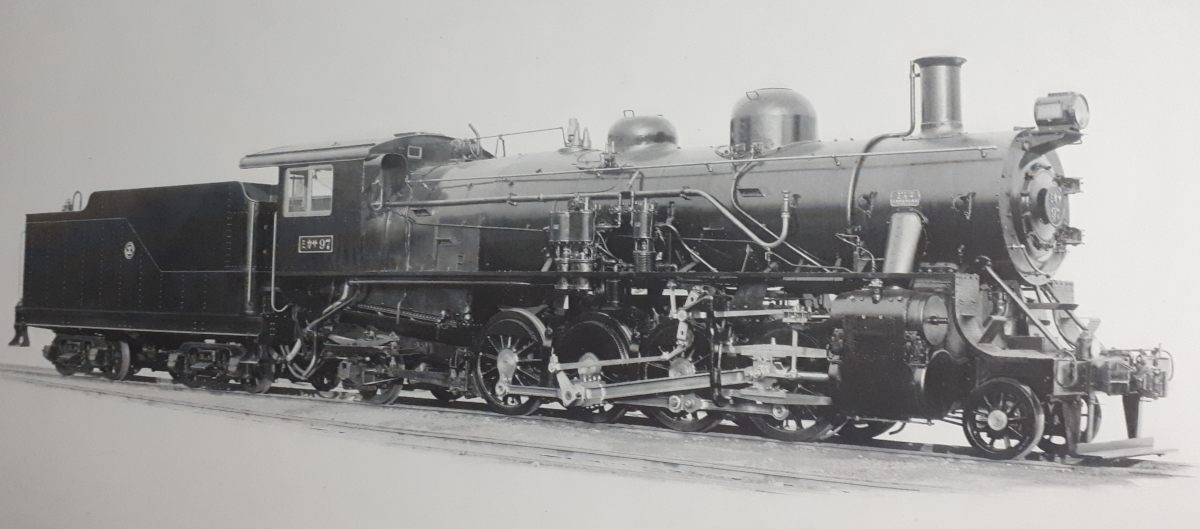
A Sentetsu Mikasa-class locomotive, identical to those built for the West Chōsen Central Railway.

As traffic volumes increased significantly through the Pacific War, the West Chōsen Central Railway found itself needing more power. As a result, eight Mikasa (ミカサ) class 2-8-2 steam locomotives were bought in 1943 and 1944.

Running Number	Builder	Year	Works Number
201	Hitachi	1943	1457
202	Hitachi	1943	1458
203	Kisha Seizō	1944	2227
204	Kisha Seizō	1944	2228
205	Kisha Seizō	1944	2229
206	Kisha Seizō	1944	2230
207	Nippon Sharyō	1944	1213
208	Nippon Sharyō	1944	1214

More were needed, but as the capacity of locomotive builders in Japan and Korea was already being stretched, Mikaro (ミカロ) class locomotives were borrowed from the South Manchuria Railway (Mantetsu) to alleviate the power shortage. Of these, the identities of two are known for certain - ミカロ18 and ミカロ22.

== Network ==
西鮮線 - 서선선 - Sōsen Line - Seoseon Line
Distance		Station name						
Total; km	S2S; km	Transcribed, Korean	Transcribed, Japanese	Hunminjeongeum	Hanja/Kanji	Opening date	Connections	Notes
0.0	0.0	Seunghori	Shōkori	승호리	勝湖里	19 June 1939	Sentetsu Pyeongyang Colliery Line	to Sentetsu 1 April 1944
4.2	4.2	Mandalli	Bantachiri	만달리	晩達里	19 June 1939		to Sentetsu 1 April 1944
8.0	3.8	Hwacheon	Kasen	화천	貨泉	19 June 1939		to Sentetsu 1 April 1944
12.7	4.7	Geumok	Kingyoku	금옥	金玉	19 June 1939		to Sentetsu 1 April 1944
15.9	3.2	Songga	Shōgai	송가	松街	19 June 1939		to Sentetsu 1 April 1944
22.3	6.4	Samdeung	Santō	삼등	三登	19 June 1939		to Sentetsu 1 April 1944
25.7	3.4	Heungnyeong	Kokuryō	흑령	黒嶺	19 June 1939		to Sentetsu 1 April 1944
29.6	3.9	Seongneum	Sekirin	석름	石凜	19 June 1939		to Sentetsu 1 April 1944
38.1	8.5	Pyeongnam Gangdong	Heinan Kōtō	평남강동	平南江東	November 1939		to Sentetsu 1 April 1944
46.1	8.0	Baekwon	Hakugen	백원	百源	18 September 1942		to Sentetsu 1 April 1944
46.1	8.0	Baekwon	Hakugen	백원	百源	18 September 1942		to Sentetsu 1 April 1944
52.3	6.2	Sundeok	Juntoku	순덕	順徳	18 September 1942		to Sentetsu 1 April 1944
55.4	2.1	Pyeongnam Seongcheon	Heinan Seisen	평남성천	平南成川	18 September 1942		to Sentetsu 1 April 1944
62.4	7.0	Samdeok	Santoku	삼덕	三徳	18 September 1942		to Sentetsu 1 April 1944
68.6; 0.0	6.2; 0.0	Sinseongcheon	Shinseisen	신성천	新成川	1 October 1941	Sentetsu Gyeongwon Line	
7.4	7.4	Pungpyeong	Hōhei	풍평	豊坪	1 October 1941		
13.1	5.7	Wonchang	Ensō	원창	院倉	1 October 1941		
16.7	3.6	Gujeong	Kushō	구정	九井	1 October 1941	Jaedong Line	
23.7	7.0	Songnam	Shōnan	송남	松南	1 October 1941		
27.7	4.0	Gachang	Kasō	가창	假倉	1 October 1941		
36.1	8.4	Bukchang	Hokusō	북창	北倉	1 October 1941		
39.6	3.5	Okcheon	Gyokusen	옥천	玉泉	28 December 1944		
42.4	2.4	Guhyeon	Kyūken	구현	鳩峴	15 May 1945		
45.8	3.4	Hoean	Kaian	회안	桧安	15 May 1945		
51.2	5.4	Jangan	Chōan	장안	長安	15 May 1945		
55.2	4.0	Jenam	Sainan	제남	済南	1945		
60.9	5.7	Deokcheon	Tokusen	덕천	徳川	1945	Deokbal Line	

徳八線 - 덕발선 - Tokuhatsu Line - Deokbal Line
Distance		Station name						
Total; km	S2S; km	Transcribed, Korean	Transcribed, Japanese	Hunminjeongeum	Hanja/Kanji	Opening date	Connections	Notes
0.0	0.0	Deokcheon	Tokusen	덕천	徳川	1945	Seoseon Line	
4.7	4.7	Hyangwon	Kyōgen	향원	郷元	1945		
10.4	5.7	Hyangjang	Kyōchō	향장	郷長	1945		
12.3	1.9	Jangsangni	Chōshanri	장상리	長上里	1945		

梓洞線 - 재동선 - Shidō Line - Jaedong Line
Distance		Station name						
Total; km	S2S; km	Transcribed, Korean	Transcribed, Japanese	Hunminjeongeum	Hanja/Kanji	Opening date	Connections	Notes
0.0	0.0	Gujeong	Kushō	구정	九井	1 October 1941	Seoseon Line	
4.4	4.4	Jaedong	Shidō	재동	梓洞	1 October 1941		
