= Chilgol station =

Railway station in North Korea

Ch'ilgol 칠골 (칠골驛)

General information
- Location: Kallimgil-dong, Man'gyŏngdae-guyŏk, Pyongyang; North Korea
- Coordinates: 39.0298°N 125.6605°E
- Owner: Korean State Railway
- Platforms: 3 (1 island)
- Tracks: 4
- Connections: ● Metro Hyŏksin Line Ch'ilgol station (planned) ● Tram Line 1

History
- Opened: 11 February 1934
- Closed: 1935
- Rebuilt: 1 October 1935
- Former names: Choch'on
- Original company: Chosen Government Railway

Services
Preceding station	Korean State Railway	Following station
Pot'onggang towards P'yŏngyang	P'yŏngnam Line	Taep'yŏng towards Namp'o
Location
- Location within Pyongyang

- Chilgol station
- Chosŏn'gŭl: 칠골역
- Hancha: 칠골驛
- Revised Romanization: Chilgol-yeok
- McCune–Reischauer: Ch'ilgol-yŏk

Ch'ilgol station is a railway station in Kallimgil-dong, Man'gyŏngdae-guyŏk, Pyongyang, North Korea, on the Pyongnam Line of the Korean State Railway.

Both passenger and freight trains use the station. There is a spur to the P'yŏngyang Wheat Flour Factory in Samhŭng-dong, and there are freight houses and loading platforms at the south side of the station.

On 11 February 1934, the Chosen Government Railway opened Choch'on station on the P'yŏngnam line. A year later it was dismantled and moved 1.2 km south, becoming today's Ch'ilgol station, opening on 1 October 1935.

== See also ==
- Chilgol
- Chilgol Church
