= Pyongchon station =

Railway station in Pyongyang, North Korea

P'yŏngch'ŏn 평천

Korean name
- Hangul: 평천역
- Hanja: 平川驛
- Revised Romanization: Pyeongcheon-yeok
- McCune–Reischauer: P'yŏngch'ŏn-yŏk

General information
- Location: Haeun 1-dong, P'yŏngch'ŏn-guyŏk, P'yŏngyang; North Korea
- Owner: Korean State Railway
- Tracks: 1

Services
Preceding station	Korean State Railway	Following station
P'yŏngyang Chocha'jang towards Pot'onggang	P'yŏngyanghwajŏn Line	Terminus
Location

P'yŏngch'ŏn station is a freight-only railway station in Haeun 1-dong, P'yŏngch'ŏn-guyŏk, P'yŏngch'ŏn, North Korea. It is the terminus of the P'yŏngyanghwajŏn Line of the Korean State Railway.

The station is a single track with spurs to serve the Posok Korean Foreign Trade Company in Haeun 2-dong, and the Pot'onggang Organic Fertiliser Factory in Chŏngpy'ŏng-dong.
