= Nampo Smelting Complex =

North Korean smelting facility

- Chosŏn'gŭl: 남포제련련합기업소
- Hancha: 南浦製鍊綜合企業所
- Revised Romanization: Nampo Jeryeon Yeonghap Kieopso
- McCune–Reischauer: Namp'o Cheryŏn Ryŏnghap Kiŏpso

The Namp'o Smelting Complex was a smelter in Hadaedu-dong, Hanggu-guyŏk, Namp'o Special City, North Korea. Prior to closure, it employed over 700 workers. It was a comprehensive nonferrous metal production facility including smelters for gold, copper and zinc, other metal rolling and alloy production, smelting by-products, and chemical fertiliser production. In 1997, annual production capacity was 15,000 tons of blister copper, 5,500 tons of refined copper, 7,000 tons of copper wire, 28,000 tons of zinc, and 5,000 tons of lime fertiliser. Concentrates and ores were received from the mines at Taedae-ri and Suan.

The facility was served by the Korean State Railway via Tojiri on the Tojiri Line.

== History ==
The Chinnampo Smelter was originally opened in stages between 1913 and 1915 as a privately owned company during the Japanese colonial era. Destroyed during the Pacific War, it was repaired and reopened in January 1946.

The complex was closed down in the late 1990s and had been demolished by 2001, reportedly due to pollution issues.
