= Nampo Shipyard =

North Korean shipbuilding company

Coordinates: 38.720°N 125.395°E

- Chosŏn'gŭl: 남포조선소련합기업소
- Hancha: 南浦造船所聯合企業所
- Revised Romanization: Nampo Joseonso Yeonghap Kieopso
- McCune–Reischauer: Namp'o Chosŏnso Ryŏnghap Kiŏpso

The Namp'o Shipyard Complex, sometimes known as Nampho Dockyard and Nampho Port, located in Haean-dong, Hanggu-guyŏk, Namp'o, is one of North Korea's primary shipbuilding enterprises, building primarily cargo ships and fishing boats.

The facility is served by the Korean State Railway via the Namp'o Port station on the P'yŏngnam Line.

== History ==
The site of the shipyard originally housed a small ironworks, which after the collapse of Japanese rule in Korea was developed into a shipyard to build and repair marine vessels of various sizes, with the first 1,000-ton ship being built in 1948. Since then, ships up to displacements over ten thousand of tons have been built there, and the facilities have been expanded several times. In addition to ship building and repair, the complex also houses a lighting equipment factory making light fixtures for use aboard marine vessels, as well as workshops for machining, casting, forging and welding components necessary for ship construction and repair, including propellers.

On 30 December 2024, the KCNA released photos of Kim Jong-un visiting the shipyard, which was constructing a new ship for the Korean's People's Navy.

== Shipyard facilities ==
Employing 7,000 workers, the facilities include drydocks, 19 cranes, various cutting machines and a 6,000-ton floating dock. Ships of up to 20,000 tons displacement can be built. Current production includes cargo ships of 14,000 and 20,000 tons, 1,500-ton destroyers and 82-ton patrol boats for the Korean People's Navy, dredgers, 3,750-ton stern trawlers, etc.

The complex houses research laboratories and a school for training shipbuilders and repair technicians.

== Ships built at yard ==
- Nampo-class corvette
