= Chongnam Line =

Railway line in North Korea

Ch'ŏngnam Line

Overview
- Native name: 청남선 (淸南線)
- Status: Closed
- Owner: Korean State Railway
- Locale: South P'yŏngan
- Termini: Ch'ŏngnam; Sŏsi; Ch'angdong
- Stations: 7

Service
- Type: Heavy rail, Freight rail Regional rail

History
- Opened: 1987

Technical
- Number of tracks: Single track
- Track gauge: 1,435 mm (4 ft 8 1/2 in) standard gauge
- Electrification: 3000 V DC Overhead line Ch'ŏngnam−Ch'illi, Ch'ŏngnam−Samch'ŏnp'o−Sŏsi

- Chongnam Line
- Hangul: 청남선
- Hanja: 淸南線
- RR: Cheongnamseon
- MR: Ch'ŏngnamsŏn

The Ch'ŏngnam Line is a partially electrified standard-gauge secondary line of the Korean State Railway in South P'yŏngan Province, North Korea, running from Ch'ŏngnam on the northern part of the Sŏhae Line to Samch'ŏnp'o via a loop line connecting several collieries to the mainline of the Sŏhae Line.

== History ==
The Korean State Railway built the Sŏhae Line to exploit coal fields in the area, opening the Mundŏk—Ch'ŏngnam—Samch'ŏnp'o—Namdong line in the 1970s; electrification of the line to Namdong was completed in 1978.

In 1987 the line was expanded in two directions - one an extension westwards from Ch'ŏngnam (see Sŏhae Line), and the other a loop line from Samch'ŏnp'o - called the Ch'ŏngnam Line - along with a connecting line to Sŏsi on the new extension. Part of the loop, from Samch'ŏnp'o to Ch'illi, was electrified.

Most of the trackage was later abandoned, including the entirety of the Ch'ŏngnam Line loop.

== Services ==
Much of the coal that originated on the line was shipped to the Ch'ŏngch'ŏn River Thermal Power Plant on the Ch'ŏnghwaryŏk Line.

== Route ==
A yellow background in the "Distance" box indicates that section of the line is not electrified.

Distance (km)		Station Name		Former Name		
Total	S2S	Transcribed	Chosŏn'gŭl (Hanja)	Transcribed	Chosŏn'gŭl (Hanja)	Connections
0.0	0.0	Ch'ŏngnam	청남 (淸南)			Sŏhae Line
~~5.2~~	~~5.2~~	Ryongrim	룡림 (龍林)			Closed.
~~6.3~~	~~1.1~~	Ch'illi	칠리 (七里)			Closed.
~~8.6~~	~~2.3~~	Wŏnhŭng	원흥 (元興)			Closed.
~~10.9~~	~~2.8~~	Ch'angdong	창동 (倉東)			Closed.
~~15.2~~	~~4.3~~	Samch'ŏnp'o	삼천포 (三川浦)			(Sŏhae Line)
