= Nampohang station =

Railway station in North Korea

Namp'ohang 남포항

Korean name
- Hangul: 남포항역
- Hanja: 南浦港驛
- Revised Romanization: Nampohang-yeok
- McCune–Reischauer: Namp'ohang-yŏk

General information
- Location: Haean-dong, Hanggu-guyŏk, Namp'o-tŭkpyŏlsi; North Korea
- Owner: Korean State Railway

History
- Opened: after 1953

Services
| Preceding station | Korean State Railway | Following station |
|---|---|---|
| Namp'o Terminus | Namp'o Port Line | Terminus |
Location

Namp'ohang station is a freight-only railway station in Haean-dong, Hanggu-guyŏk, Namp'o Special City, North Korea. It is the terminus of the Namp'ohang Line from Namp'o on the P'yŏngnam Line of the Korean State Railway.

The station was opened by the Korean State Railway after the end of the Korean War to serve a petroleum storage tank farm, the Namp'o Glass Bottle Factory, and the Namp'o Shipyard complex.
