= Ryonggang station =

Railway station in North Korea

Ryonggang 룡강

Korean name
- Hangul: 룡강역
- Hanja: 龍岡驛
- Revised Romanization: Ryonggang-yeok
- McCune–Reischauer: Ryonggang-yŏk

General information
- Location: Ryonggang-ŭp, Ryonggang, South P'yŏngan; North Korea
- Coordinates: 38.8537°N 125.4244°E
- Owner: Korean State Railway
- Platforms: 3 (1 island)
- Tracks: 4

History
- Opened: 16 October 1910
- Former names: Chinjidong Station; Chosŏn'gŭl: 진지동역; Hanja: 真池洞駅
- Original company: Chosen Government Railway

Services
Preceding station	Korean State Railway	Following station
Kangsŏ towards P'yŏngyang	P'yŏngnam Line	Kalch'ŏn towards Namp'o
Ryongho towards Mayŏng	Ryonggang Line	Terminus
Location

Ryonggang station is a railway station in Ryonggang-ŭp, Ryonggang county, South P'yŏngan province, North Korea. It is the junction of the P'yŏngnam and Ryonggang lines of the Korean State Railway.

Originally called Chinjidong station and later renamed Ryonggang station, it was opened by the Chosen Government Railway, along with the rest of the mainline of the P'yŏngnam Line, on 16 October 1910.
