= Yangmak station =

Railway station in North Korea

Yangmak 양막

Korean name
- Hangul: 양막역
- Hanja: 陽幕驛
- Revised Romanization: Yangmag-yeok
- McCune–Reischauer: Yangmak-yŏk

General information
- Location: Chaeyang-dong, Ryonggang, South P'yŏngan; North Korea
- Coordinates: 38.8537°N 125.4244°E
- Owner: Korean State Railway
- Tracks: 2

History
- Original company: Chosen Government Railway

Services
Preceding station	Korean State Railway	Following station
Husan Terminus	Husan Line	Terminus
Location

Yangmak station is a small freight-only railway station in Chaeyang-dong, Ryonggang county, South P'yŏngan province, North Korea. It is the terminus of the Husan Line of the Korean State Railway. The tracks continue beyond the station to serve a large granite quarry.
