= Tojiri Line =

Railway line in North Korea

Overview
- Native name: 도지리선(島智里線)
- Status: Operational
- Owner: Korean State Railway
- Locale: Namp'o-tŭkpyŏlsi
- Termini: Namp'o; Tojiri
- Stations: 2

Service
- Type: Heavy rail, Freight rail
- Operator: Korean State Railway

History
- Opened: 1910s
- Closed: late-1990s–2001 (Tojiri–Namp'o Smelting Complex)

Technical
- Line length: 9.9 km (6.2 mi)
- Number of tracks: Single track
- Track gauge: 1,435 mm (4 ft 8 1/2 in) standard gauge

- Tojiri Line
- Hangul: 도지리선
- Hanja: 島智里線
- RR: Dojiriseon
- MR: Tojirisŏn

The Tojiri Line is a non-electrified secondary railway line of the Korean State Railway in Namp'o Special City, North Korea, from Namp'o on the P'yŏngnam Line to Tojiri.

== Services ==
The line was built to serve the Namp'o Smelting Complex, which processed nonferrous metals, shipping gold, zinc, coarse and refined copper, copper wire and chemical fertilisers. It received ore and concentrates from mines at Taedae-ri and Suan.

== Route ==
A yellow background in the "Distance" box indicates that section of the line is not electrified.

Distance (km)		Station Name		Former Name		
Total	S2S	Transcribed	Chosŏn'gŭl (Hanja)	Transcribed	Chosŏn'gŭl (Hanja)	Connections
0.0	0.0	Namp'o	남포 (南浦)	Chinnamp'o	진남포 (鎭南浦)	P'yŏngnam Line
8.8	8.8	Tojiri	도지리 (島智里)			
9.9	1.1	Namp'o Smelting Complex	남포제련련합기업소 (南浦製鍊綜合企業所)			
