= Namdong station =

Railway station in North Korea

Namdong station is a closed railway station in Sukch'ŏn County, South P'yŏngan Province, North Korea; it was the terminus of the Namdong Line from P'yŏngnam Onch'ŏn on the P'yŏngnam Line, and of the Namdong Branch of the Sŏhae Line.
