= Pyongchon-guyok =

District of Pyongyang, North Korea

Coordinates: 39°00′00″N 125°43′12″E

P'yŏngch'ŏn-guyŏk
- Guyŏk of Pyongyang

Korean transcription(s)
  - Hangul: 평천구역
  - Hanja: 平川區域
  - Revised Romanization: Pyeongcheon-guyeok
  - McCune–Reischauer: P'yŏngch'ŏn-guyŏk
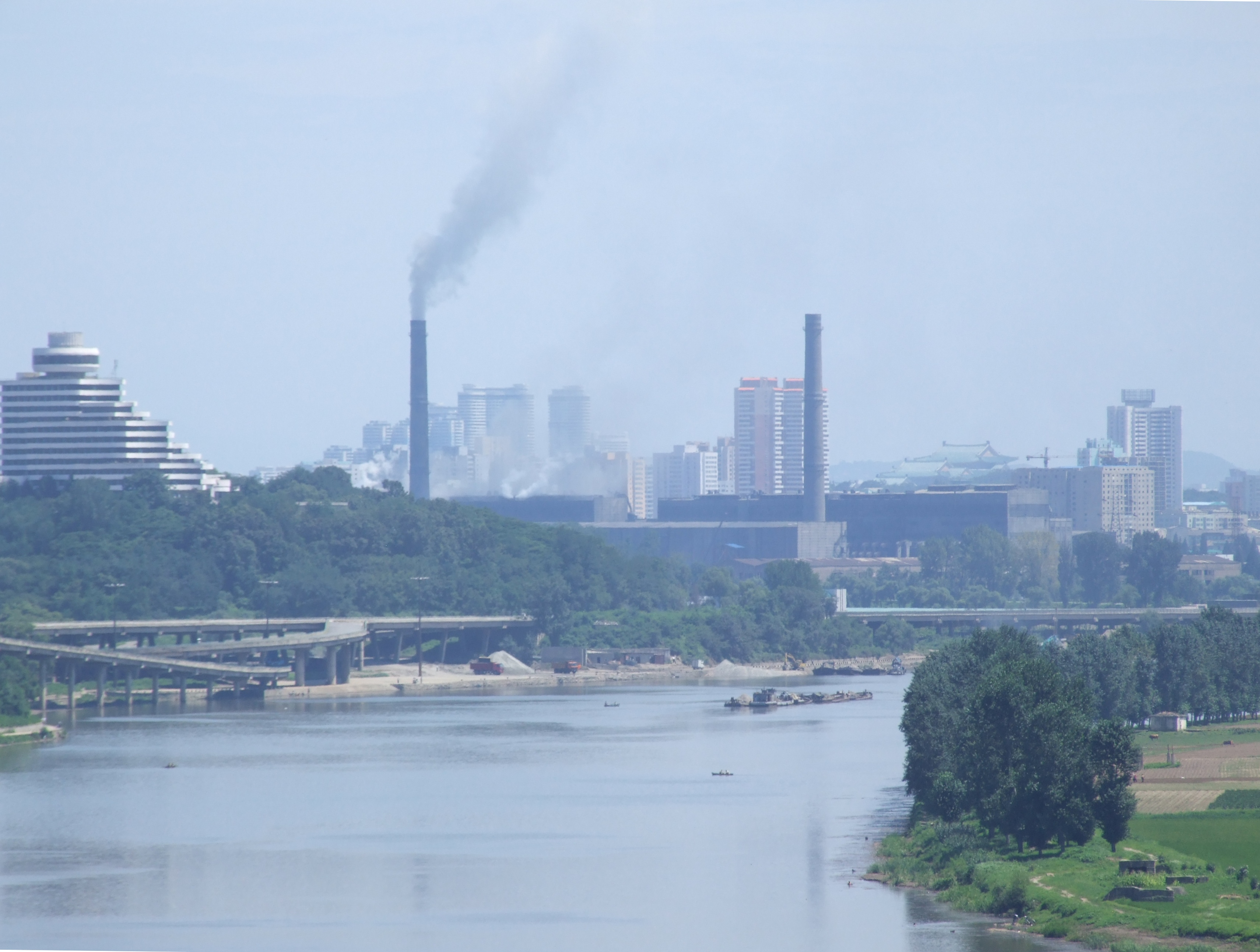
- Pyongyang Thermal Power Plant in P'yŏngch'ŏn-guyŏk

- Location of Pyongchong-guyok within Pyongyang
- Country: North Korea
- Direct-administered city: Pyongyang-Chikhalsi
- Administrative divisions: 17 administrative dong

Area
  - Total: 8.4 km^{2} (3.2 sq mi)

Population (2008)
  - Total: 181,142
  - Density: 22,000/km^{2} (56,000/sq mi)

P'yŏngch'ŏn-guyŏk (Phyongchon District) is one of the 19 guyok which constitute the city of Pyongyang, North Korea. It is bordered by the Taedong River in the south and the Pothonggang Canal in the north and Potong River in the west, and to the east by Chung-guyŏk, from which it is separated by the yard area of Pyongyang railway station.

== History ==
The name of the district, passed down from the former Pyongchon-myon, means a flat area, which water flows through.

It was newly established as a guyŏk in October 1960 by the Pyongyang City People's Committee through a mandate of the Central Committee of the Workers' Party of Korea.

In 1963, a part of Pyongchon-dong was separated to form Haeun-dong, a part of Kansong-dong was separated to form Ryukkyo-dong and parts of Puksong-dong and Pongji-dong were split off to form Pongnam-dong and Ansan-dong.

In 1967, Ryukkyo-dong was divided into two administrative dong and a part of Pyongchon-dong was separated to create Saemaul-dong.

In 1972, Pyongchon-dong and Saemaul-dong were both divided into two administrative dong.

In 1989, Puksong-dong and Haeun-dong were both divided into two administrative dong.

In late 2021, anti-Kim Jong-un graffiti was allegedly sprayed on a wall saying "Kim Jong-un, you son of a b*****. The people are starving to death because of you" whilst a Workers' Party of Korea meeting was being held. As a result, government officials demanded handwriting samples from residents in the area.

=== 2014 building collapse ===
On 13 May 2014, a 23-story building under construction in Ansan 1-dong collapsed, with the following cleanup apparently lasting at most four days. According to tourist photos taken from Juche Tower, the building vanished between around midday on May 13 and 9:35 on May 14, confirming the report by Rodong Sinmun, while on 13 May, an NGO was approached to provide temporary shelter. Prior to collapse, photos of the building taken in April and May reveal the building had only slightly changed, potentially indicating that it had been abandoned. When the building collapsed, it did not damage nearby buildings, revealing it had likely collapsed vertically downwards, which according to experts interviewed by NK News, potentially indicates the demolition of the apparently abandoned building.

South Korean sources speculated that the collapse was carried in the news to demonstrate the care of the government, in contrast to the Sewol disaster. While NK News initially claimed that the government was left with no choice but to reveal the accident due to foreigners knowing, the accident was not known until state media reported it and the move was likely due to an overall shift in state media to report negative events to show the government as more accountable. In the aftermath, Kim Jong Un visited injured soldiers at Taesongsan Hospital, possibly construction workers from the collapse.

An unverified claim by a defector suggested that the building might have been over the height for the area and that the concrete mixture used was suboptimal. It was further alleged that water was leaking into the basement while 'rocks were protruding and piercing through the concrete', and that some factory managers had siphoned material for personal gain, leading to decreases in product quality. According to Associated Press interviews, the accident happened because 'they broke the rules and methods of construction'. The North Korean economics journal Kyongje Yongu, stated that 'Technical regulations and construction methods are disregarded when projects are rushed to be finished by their completion date, which is often decided in advance to coincide with a holiday or anniversary', and to advance self-sustainability, substandard materials are used.

== Administrative divisions ==
P'yŏngch'ŏn-guyŏk is divided into 17 administrative districts known as dong.

| | Chosŏn'gŭl | Hancha | | Chosŏn'gŭl | Hancha |
|---|---|---|---|---|---|
| Ansan 1-dong | 안산1동 | 鞍山1洞 | Pongnam-dong | 봉남동 | 鳳南洞 |
| Ansan 2-dong | 안산2동 | 鞍山2洞 | Puksŏng 1-dong | 북성1동 | 北城1洞 |
| Chŏngpy'ŏng-dong | 정평동 | 井平洞 | Puksŏng 2-dong | 북성2동 | 北城2洞 |
| Haeun 1-dong | 해운1동 | 海運1洞 | P'yŏngch'ŏn 1-dong | 평천1동 | 平川1洞 |
| Haeun 2-dong | 해운2동 | 海運2洞 | P'yŏngch'ŏn 2-dong | 평천2동 | 平川2洞 |
| Kansŏng-dong | 간성동 | 干城洞 | Ryukkyo 1-dong | 륙교1동 | 陸橋1洞 |
| Pongji-dong | 봉지동 | 鳳池洞 | Ryukkyo 2-dong | 륙교2동 | 陸橋2洞 |
| Ponghak-tong | 봉학동 | 鳳鶴洞 | Saemaŭl 1-dong | 새마을1동 | 새마을1洞 |
| Ponghak-tong | 봉학동 | 鳳鶴洞 | Saemaŭl 2-dong | 새마을2동 | 새마을2洞 |

== Economy ==
=== Electricity generation ===
It is probably best known as the location of the Pyongyang Thermal Power Plant, in Saemaŭl-dong, which is the electricity and heating source for Pyongyang's central neighbourhoods and the surrounding region. The plant has a design capacity of 700 MW and an estimated capacity of 500 MW, although in statistics released in 2009, it generated around 227 MW. Sanctions have restricted the amount of fossil fuel available, although they have also developed alternate forms of energy. The plant was built in 1960 with Soviet assistance, although in 1960, due to above average rainfall, there was sufficient electricity generated by the dams on the Yalu River but that was dependent on rainfall and thus sometimes unreliable.

While the equipment in the plant has been aging, it was renewed by the supply of two new generators from China in 2018. Since the 2000s, various aspects of the power plant were updated, including the transformer yard, expansions to water treatment facilities, fuel storage area, settling ponds and rail facilities. In 2020, the power plant underwent extensive overhaul to restore its original generation capacity, and in 2021, various innovations were applied to keep the boilers operating at full capacity.

=== Other industries ===
Other notable industries in the guyŏk are the Pot'onggang Organic Fertiliser Factory in Chŏngpy'ŏng-dong and the Taedonggang Battery Factory in Saemaŭl-dong.

The Pyongyang Trolleybus Factory is located in Pyongchon-guyok, although its address is listed as being in Potonggang-guyok.

== Education ==
It is also the location of the Mansudae Art Studio and School, the Pyongyang Chang Chol Gu University of Commerce, the Pyongyang University of Printing Industrial Arts.

== Tourism ==
For international visitors, it is the location of the Pot'ong Hotel and the Ansan Chodasso(안산초대소) Guest House.

The Pyongchon Revolutionary Site in P'yŏngch'ŏn 1-dong commemorates where Kim Il Sung chose the building site of the first ammunition factory built after the liberation of Korea.

== Transportation ==
The Korean State Railway has a branchline of the P'yŏngnam Line in the guyŏk with a marshalling yard, Pyongyang Choch'ajang in Chŏngp'yŏng-dong, and the freight-only P'yŏngch'ŏn Station in Haeun 1-dong, providing a number of industries in the area with rail freight service.

The district is served Chollima Line terminus Puhung station, tram line 3, trolleybus line 5, various bus routes and waterways.
