= Pyongyang Wheat Flour Processing Factory =

Food processing factory in North Korea

The Pyongyang Wheat Flour Factory(Korean: 평양밀가루가공공장) is a food processing factory in Samhŭng-dong, Man'gyŏngdae-guyŏk, P'yŏngyang, North Korea, mainly producing wheat flours, cookies, noodles and yeast. The total area of the plant is 120,000 m^{2} (1,300,000 sq ft). Originally built in 1976, It is served by rail, via Ch'ilgol station on the P'yŏngnam Line of the Korean State Railway.

== See also ==
- Pyongyang Ostrich Farm
