= Namdong Line =

Railway line in South P'yŏngan Province, North Korea

Overview
- Native name: 남동선(南洞線)
- Status: Closed
- Owner: Korean State Railway
- Locale: South P'yŏngan
- Termini: P'yŏngnam Onch'ŏn; Namdong
- Stations: 11

Service
- Type: Heavy rail Passenger rail, Freight rail
- Operator: Korean State Railway

History
- Closed: 2000s?

Technical
- Line length: 77.3 km (48.0 mi)
- Number of tracks: Single track
- Track gauge: 1,435 mm (4 ft 8 1/2 in) standard gauge
Route map
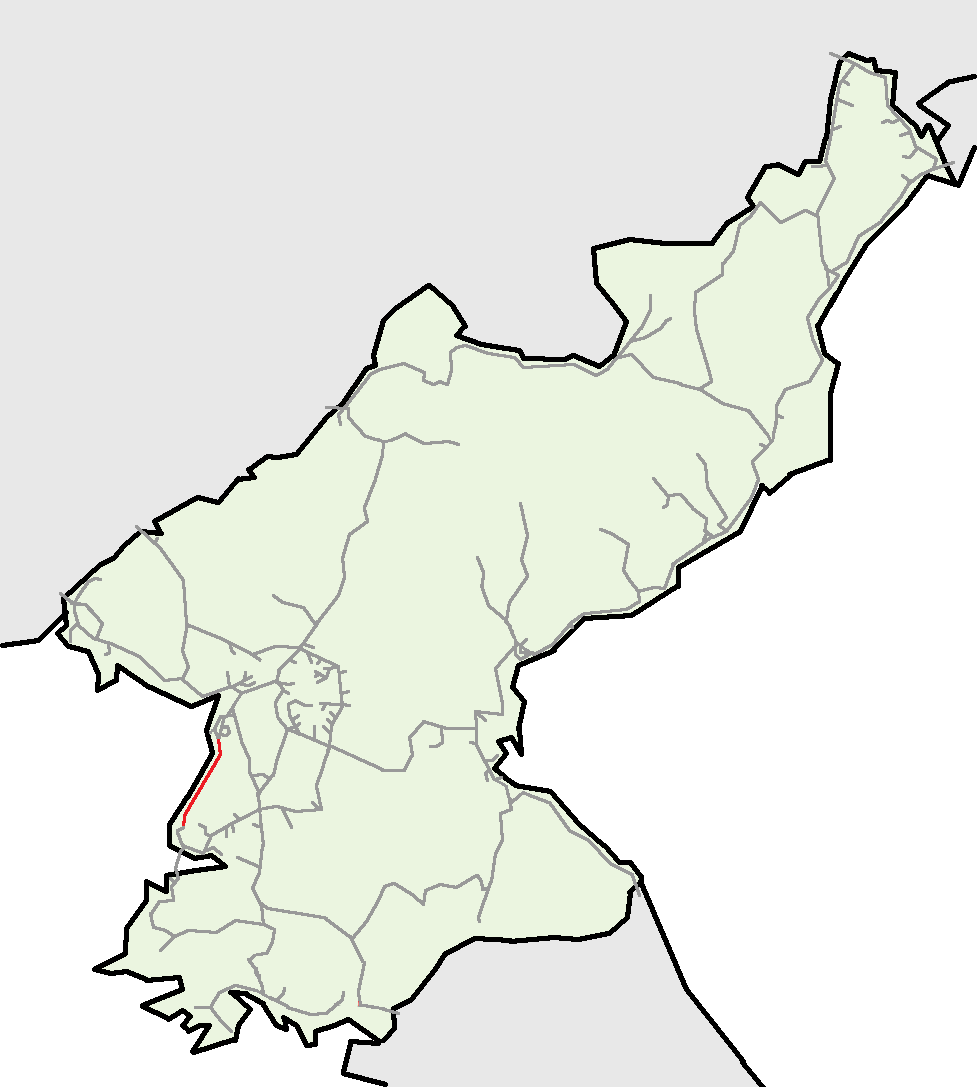

- Namdong Line
- Hangul: 남동선
- Hanja: 南洞線
- RR: Namdongseon
- MR: Namdongsŏn

The Namdong Line was a non-electrified secondary railway line of the Korean State Railway in South P'yŏngan Province, North Korea, from P'yŏngnam Onch'ŏn on the P'yŏngnam Line to Namdong, where it connected to the (now closed) Namdong Branch of the Sŏhae Line.

The line was used to transport coal from the Sŏhae Line to the thermal power plant at Namp'o.

The line was closed sometime in the 2000s; the line was still depicted as active in the 2002 passenger timetable. The tracks, as well as some of the bridges, have since been removed, and in places the right of way is in use as a roadway.

== Route ==
A yellow background in the "Distance" box indicates that a section of the line is not electrified.

Distance (km)		Station Name		Former Name		
Total	S2S	Transcribed	Chosŏn'gŭl (Hanja)	Transcribed	Chosŏn'gŭl (Hanja)	Connections (former)
0.0	0.0	P'yŏngnam Onch'ŏn	평남온천 (平南溫泉)	Yonggang Onch'ŏn	용강온천 (龍岡溫泉)	P'yŏngnam Line
~~8.4~~	~~8.4~~	Ansŏk	안석 (安石)			Closed
~~14.5~~	~~6.1~~	P'ungjŏng	풍정 (豊井)			Closed
~~21.2~~	~~6.7~~	Iap	이압 (二鴨)			Closed
~~30.1~~	~~8.9~~	Raksaeng	락생 (樂生)			Closed
~~38.1~~	~~8.0~~	Sŏkta	석다 (石多)			Closed
~~43.9~~	~~5.8~~	Hanch'ŏn	한천 (漢川)			Closed
~~55.4~~	~~11.5~~	Taep'ung	대풍 (大豊)			Closed
~~61.2~~	~~5.8~~	Yŏmjŏn	염전 (鹽田)			Closed
~~69.1~~	~~7.9~~	Manp'ung	만풍 (萬豊)			Closed
~~77.3~~	~~8.2~~	Namdong	남동 (南洞)			Closed (Namdong Branch Line)
