= Husan Line =

Railway line in North Korea

Overview
- Native name: 후산선 (後山線)
- Status: Operational
- Owner: Chosen Government Railway (<1937–1945); Korean State Railway (since 1945)
- Locale: Namp'o-t'ŭkpyŏlsi, South P'yŏngan
- Termini: Husan; Yangmak
- Stations: 2

Service
- Type: Heavy rail, Passenger & freight rail Regional rail

History
- Opened: before 1937

Technical
- Line length: 3.7 km (2.3 mi)
- Number of tracks: Single track
- Track gauge: 1,435 mm (4 ft 8 1/2 in) standard gauge

- Husan Line
- Hangul: 후산선
- Hanja: 後山線
- RR: Husanseon
- MR: Husansŏn

The Husan Line is a non-electrified standard-gauge freight-only secondary line of the Korean State Railway located entirely within Namp'o Special City, South P'yŏngan Province, North Korea, running from Husan on the Ryonggang Line to Yangmak.

The Husan Line runs 3.7 km (2.3 mi) along the west side of the Ryongho Reservoir to serve a number of industries around Yangmak. The industrial trackage continues for a ways beyond Yangmak to the Yangmak granite quarry.

== History ==
The line was originally opened by the Chosen Government Railway prior to 1937.

== Services ==
Most freight on the line is outbound from the granite quarry past Yangmak.

== Route ==
A yellow background in the "Distance" box indicates that section of the line is not electrified.

Distance (km)		Station Name		Former Name		
Total	S2S	Transcribed	Chosŏn'gŭl (Hanja)	Transcribed	Chosŏn'gŭl (Hanja)	Connections
0.0	0.0	Husan	후산 (後山)			Ryonggang Line
3.7	3.7	Yangmak	양막 (陽幕)			
