= Waudo-guyok =

Waudo Ward 와우도구역
- Wards

Korean transcription(s)
  - Chosŏn'gŭl: 와우도구역
  - Hancha: 臥牛島區域
  - McCune-Reischauer: Waudo-guyŏk
  - Revised Romanization: Waudo-guyeok
- Interactive map of Waudo Ward
- Country: North Korea
- Province: South P'yŏngan
- Special City: Namp'o-tŭkpyŏlsi
- Administrative divisions: 17 tong, 1 ri

Waudo-guyŏk is a kuyŏk in Namp'o Special City, South P'yŏngan province, North Korea.

Plans have been announced to create a "Chindo Export Processing Zone" from some areas of Chindo-dong and Hwado-ri, Waudo-guyŏk.

The West Sea Barrage is located in Waudo District.

== Administrative divisions ==
Waudo-guyŏk is divided into 18 tong (neighbourhoods) and 5 ri (villages):

	Chosŏn'gŭl	Hancha
Chindo-dong	진도동	進島洞
Chinsu-dong	진수동	進水洞
Chisan-dong	지산동	芝山洞
Ch'eyukch'on-dong	체육촌동	體育村洞
Hoechang-dong	회창동	會倉洞
Kammun 1-dong	갑문1동	閘門1洞
Kammun 2-dong	갑문2동	閘門2洞
Masa-dong	마사동	麻沙洞
Masan-dong	마산동	麻山洞
Namhŭng-dong	남흥동	南興洞
Namsan-dong	남산동	南山洞
Okch'ŏndae-dong	옥천대동	玉泉臺洞
Ryongjŏng-dong	룡정동	龍井洞
Ryongsu-dong	룡수동	龍水洞
Saegil-dong	새길동	
Sŏhŭng-dong	서흥동	西興洞
Taedae-dong	대대동	大代洞
Waudo-dong	와우도동	臥牛島洞
Hwado-ri	화도리	火島里
Ryŏngnam-ri	령남리	嶺南里
Sillyŏng-ri	신령리	新寧里
Sogang-ri	소강리	蘇康里
Songgwal-li	송관리	松串里

== Transportation ==
Waudo District is served by the P'yŏngnam and Sŏhaekammun lines of the Korean State Railway.
