= Chonghwaryok Line =

Railway line in North Korea

Ch'ŏnghwaryŏk Line

Overview
- Native name: 청화력선 (淸火力線)
- Status: Operational
- Owner: Korean State Railway
- Locale: South P'yŏngan
- Termini: Kubongsan; Ch'ŏnghwaryŏk
- Stations: 2

Service
- Type: Heavy rail, freight rail
- Operator(s): Korean State Railway

History
- Opened: 1976

Technical
- Line length: 2.5 km (1.6 mi)
- Number of tracks: Single track
- Track gauge: 1,435 mm (4 ft 8 1/2 in) standard gauge

- Chonghwaryok Line
- Hangul: 청화력선
- Hanja: 淸火力線
- RR: Cheonghwaryeokseon
- MR: Ch'ŏnghwaryŏksŏn

The Ch'ŏnghwaryŏk Line is an electrified standard-gauge freight-only secondary line of the Korean State Railway in South P'yŏngan Province, North Korea, running from Kubongsan on the Kubongsan Line to Ch'ŏnghwaryŏk.

== History ==
The line was opened by the Korean State Railway in the 1976 to supply the Ch'ŏngch'ŏn River Thermal Power Plant with coal from the Sŏhae Line. The name of the line, and of Ch'ŏnghwaryŏk station, is derived from the name of the power plant - Ch'ŏngch'ŏngang Hwaryŏk Paljŏnso (청천강화력발전소).

== Route ==
A yellow background in the "Distance" box indicates that section of the line is not electrified.

Distance (km)		Station Name		Former Name		
Total	S2S	Transcribed	Chosŏn'gŭl (Hanja)	Transcribed	Chosŏn'gŭl (Hanja)	Connections
0.0	0.0	Kubongsan	구봉산 (龜鳳山)			Kubongsan Line
2.5	2.5	Ch'ŏnghwaryŏk	청화력 (淸火力)			
