= Potonggang Organic Fertiliser Factory =

North Korean chemical company

The Pot'onggang Organic Compound Fertiliser Factory (Korean: 보통강유기질복합비료공장), located in Chŏngpy'ŏng-dong, P'yŏngch'ŏn-guyŏk, P'yŏngyang, North Korea, was opened in 2012 to produce organic fertiliser making use of sediments and fly ash from an adjacent sewage treatment plant and sludge from the Pot'ong River. It is served by rail via the P'yŏngnam Line of the Korean State Railway.
