= Taedonggang Battery Factory =

Battery factory in Pyongyang, North Korea

The Taedonggang Battery Factory (Korean: 대동강축전지공장), located in Saemaŭl-dong, P'yŏngch'ŏn-guyŏk, P'yŏngyang, North Korea, is a factory producing batteries for vehicles and power plants. It is served by rail via the P'yŏngnam Line of the Korean State Railway. It was built in 1975 with Soviet aid, becoming operational in 1982 and subsequently expanded in 1987. The factory, with a total area of 165,000 m^{2} (1,780,000 sq ft), employs 4,500 workers.
