= Sohae Line =

Railway line in North Korea

Sŏhae Line

Overview
- Other names: Anju Colliery Line (안주탄광성 安州炭鑛線)
- Native name: 서해선 (西海線)
- Status: Operational
- Owner: Korean State Railway
- Locale: South P'yŏngan
- Termini: Mundŏk; Hwap'ung Namdong (closed)
- Stations: 10

Service
- Type: Heavy rail, Passenger & freight rail Regional rail
- Operator(s): Korean State Railway

History
- Opened: Mundŏk–Namdong: 1970s Ch'ŏngnam–Hwap'ung: 1987
- Closed: 2000s

Technical
- Line length: 22.4 km (13.9 mi)
- Number of tracks: Single track
- Track gauge: 1,435 mm (4 ft 8 1/2 in) standard gauge
- Electrification: 3000 V DC Overhead line Mundŏk-P'yŏngnam Sŏho, Ch'ŏngnam-Sŏsi
Route map
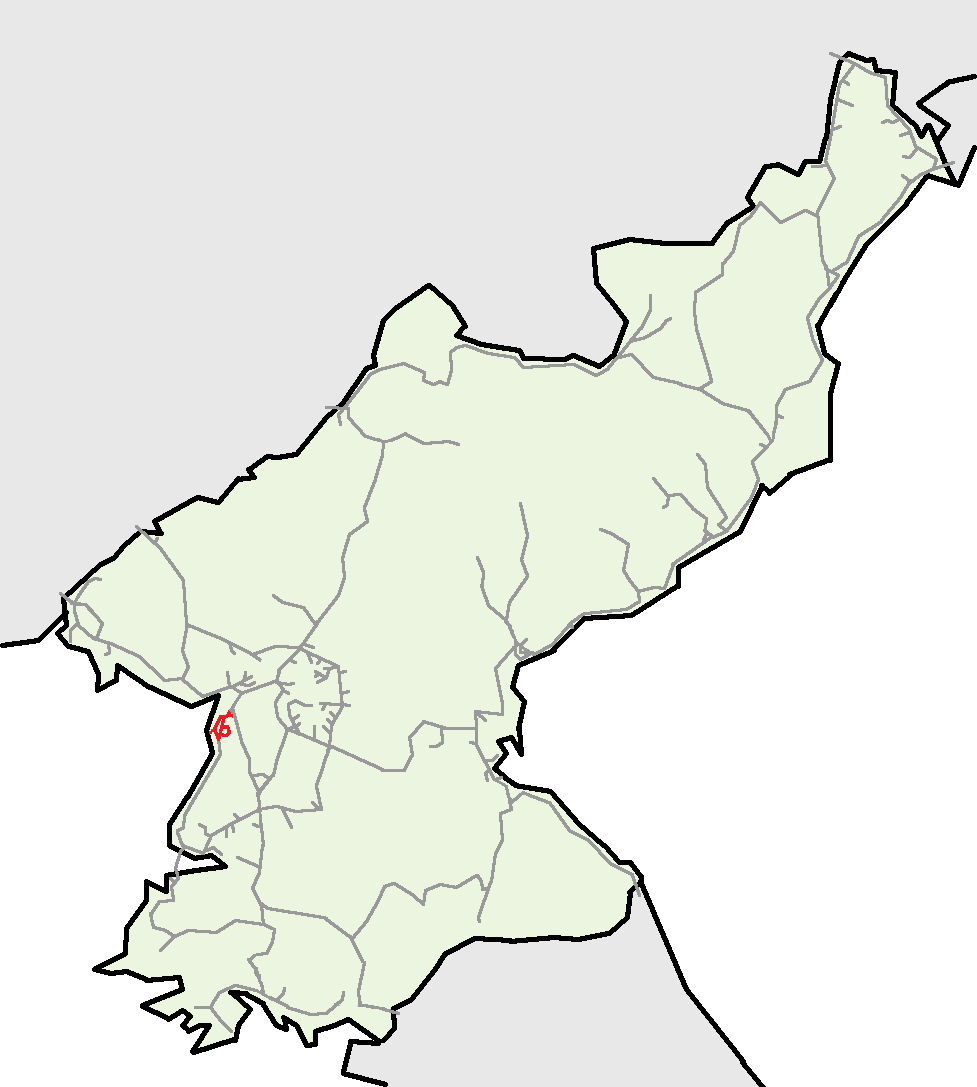

- Sohae Line
- Hangul: 서해선
- Hanja: 西海線
- RR: Seohaeseon
- MR: Sŏhaesŏn

The Sŏhae Line, also known as the Anju Colliery Line (안주 탄광선), is a partially electrified standard-gauge secondary line of the Korean State Railway in South P'yŏngan Province, North Korea, running from Mundŏk on the P'yŏngŭi Line to Hwap'ung. The line is electrified between Mundŏk and P'yŏngnam Sŏho and between Ch'ŏngnam and Sŏsi.

== History ==
In order to exploit coal fields in the area, the Korean State Railway opened the 22.4 km (13.9 mi) Mundŏk—Ch'ŏngnam—Namdong line in the 1970s. Electrification of the line to Namdong was completed in 1978. In 1987 the line was expanded in two directions - one a loop line from Samch'ŏnp'o - the Ch'ŏngnam Line - and the other an extension westwards from Ch'ŏngnam to Hwap'ung. The sections from P'yŏngnam Sŏho to Hwap'ung and to Sŏsi were later abandoned.

== Services ==
Much of the coal that originates on the line is shipped to the Ch'ŏngch'ŏn River Thermal Power Plant on the Ch'ŏnghwaryŏk Line.

== Route ==
A yellow background in the "Distance" box indicates that section of the line is not electrified.

=== Mainline ===
Distance (km)		Station Name		Former Name		
Total	S2S	Transcribed	Chosŏn'gŭl (Hanja)	Transcribed	Chosŏn'gŭl (Hanja)	Connections (Former)
0.0	0.0	Mundŏk	문덕 (文德)	Mansŏng	만성 (萬城)	P'yŏngŭi Line
5.6	5.6	Sŏngbŏp	성법 (聖法)			(Sŏngbŏp Branch)
11.6	6.0	Ch'ŏngnam	청남 (淸南)			(Ch'ŏngnam Line)
15.6	4.0	Samch'ŏnp'o	삼천포 (三川浦)			Sŏsi Branch (Ch'ŏngnam Line)
~~22.4~~	~~6.8~~	Namdong	남동 (南洞)			Closed. (Namdong Line)

=== Hwap'ung Branch ===
Distance (km)		Station Name		Former Name		
Total	S2S	Transcribed	Chosŏn'gŭl (Hanja)	Transcribed	Chosŏn'gŭl (Hanja)	Connections (Former)
0.0	0.0	Ch'ŏngnam	청남 (淸南)			Main line (Ch'ŏngnam Line)
2.2	2.2	Ripsŏk T'an'gwang	립석탄광 (立石炭鑛)			
5.0	2.8	T'aehyang	태향 (汰香)			
10.2	5.2	P'yŏngnam Sŏho	평남서호 (平南西湖)			(Sŏsi Branch)
~~13.5~~	~~3.4~~	Hwap'ung	화풍 (和豊)			Closed

=== Sŏngbŏp Branch ===
Closed.

Distance (km)		Station Name		Former Name		
Total	S2S	Transcribed	Chosŏn'gŭl (Hanja)	Transcribed	Chosŏn'gŭl (Hanja)	Connections
0.0	0.0	Sŏngbŏp	성법 (聖法)			(Main line)
		Taegyo	대교 (大橋)			(P'yŏngŭi Line)

=== Sŏsi Branch ===
Closed from P'yŏngnam Sŏho, but Sŏsi Station is still in use via Samch'ŏnp'o.

Distance (km)		Station Name		Former Name		
Total	S2S	Transcribed	Chosŏn'gŭl (Hanja)	Transcribed	Chosŏn'gŭl (Hanja)	Connections
0.0	0.0	Samch'ŏnp'o	삼천포 (三川浦)			Main line (Ch'ŏngnam Line)
4.1	4.1	Sŏsi	서시 (-)	Sŏsa	서사 (西砂)	
~~7.9~~	~~3.8~~	P'yŏngnam Sŏho	평남서호 (平南西湖)			Main line. Section from Sŏsi to P'yŏngnam Sŏho closed.
