= Mayong station =

North Korean railway station

Mayŏng 마영

Korean name
- Hangul: 마영역
- Hanja: 麻永驛
- Revised Romanization: Mayeong-yeok
- McCune–Reischauer: Mayŏng-yŏk

General information
- Location: Mayŏng-rodongjagu, Onch'ŏn-gun, South P'yŏngan; North Korea
- Coordinates: 38.8537°N 125.4244°E
- Owner: Korean State Railway
- Platforms: 1
- Tracks: 2

History
- Original company: Chosen Government Railway

Services
Preceding station	Korean State Railway	Following station
Terminus	Ryonggang Line	Ryongwŏl towards Ryonggang
Location

Mayŏng station is a small railway station in Mayŏng-rodongjagu, Onch'ŏn county, South P'yŏngan province, North Korea. It is the terminus of the Ryonggang Line of the Korean State Railway. The station provides freight service to a small mine nearby, and there is a local passenger train, 733/734, operating between Mayŏng and Kangsŏ on the P'yŏngnam Line.
