= Onchon Air Base =

Onchon Airport
- IATA: N/A; ICAO: N/A; FAA LID: N/A

Summary
- Airport type: Military
- Serves: Onchon, North Korea
- Elevation AMSL: 23 ft (7.0 m)
- Coordinates: 38°54′34.20″N 125°13′56.00″E

Map
- Location within North Korea Location within Asia Location within North Pacific Location within Earth

Runways
Direction	Length		Surface
Direction	ft	m	Surface
01/19	8,150	2,484	Concrete

Onchon Air Base (온천비행장) is an air base near Onchon, Pyongan-namdo, North Korea.

== Facilities ==
The airfield has a single concrete runway 01/19 measuring 8150 x 170 feet (2484 x 52 m). It has a full-length parallel taxiway and several aprons, and hangars. It is on the west coast of North Korea and approximately 47 km (29 mi) west of Pyongyang.

Approximately 5 km (3.1 mi) to the southeast of the air base is an underground aviation complex with runways extending outwards from the tunnel systems.
