= Ch'ŏnji Lubricant Factory =

Factory in Hanggu-guyŏk, North Korea

- Operated: 1997–present
- Location: Hanggu-guyŏk, Namp'o, North Korea
- Coordinates: 38°45′15″N 125°24′53″E
- Industry: Lubricant manufacturing

Korean name
- Hangul: 천지윤활유공장
- Hanja: 天地潤滑油工場
- RR: Cheonji yunhwaryu gongjang
- MR: Ch'ŏnji yunhwaryu kongjang

The Ch'ŏnji Lubricant Factory (Korean: 천지윤활유공장), located in Hanggu-guyŏk, Namp'o, North Korea, is a factory producing various industrial lubricants, greases, and transformer oils.

== History ==
The Ch'ŏnji Lubricant Factory was established in 1997, and is the oldest North Korean lubricant factory. It was previously known as the Seungri Lubricant Factory and it was affiliated with the Seungri Trading Company, a company formerly controlled by Jang Song-thaek. It was renamed to the Ch'ŏnji Lubricant Factory because it produced a lubricant product called Ch'ŏnji. The factory makes use of automated production, and the processing equipment in the factory was purchased from a French company.

External image
- "North Korean leader Kim Jong Un smiles during a visit to the Chonji Lubricant Factory" (via Reuters)

On 5 August 2014, Kim Jong Un visited the factory and proclaimed the factory's products to be "as good as the imported ones". He stressed that the products of the factory must continue to be developed and improved to remain competitive in the international market. A press photograph from Kim's visit to the factory depicting him smiling at a vat of lubricant became a source of mockery in United States media. The photograph was ridiculed by Stephen Colbert on his show The Colbert Report, while HuffPost and NBC News both noted that Kim appeared to be "amused" by the lube.

In June 2024, the factory was investigated by the Namp'o city prosecutors' office for corruption and safety violations to prepare it for an intensified workload as part of a national industrial revitalization policy. The investigation uncovered that safety violations had resulted in multiple fires and that employees regularly stole products and covered for each other. The prosecutors' office denounced the factory as a "den of thieves", and about 20 employees were evaluated for potential dismissal. Two onsite executives were dismissed and replaced due to being lenient towards employees that they had personal relations with. The city government closely monitored the factory for several months as restructuring took place and stated that dismissed workers were to be replaced with young graduates from vocational schools, who would undergo rigorous training.
