= Konguk station =

Pyongyang Metro station

Kŏn'guk Station 건국역
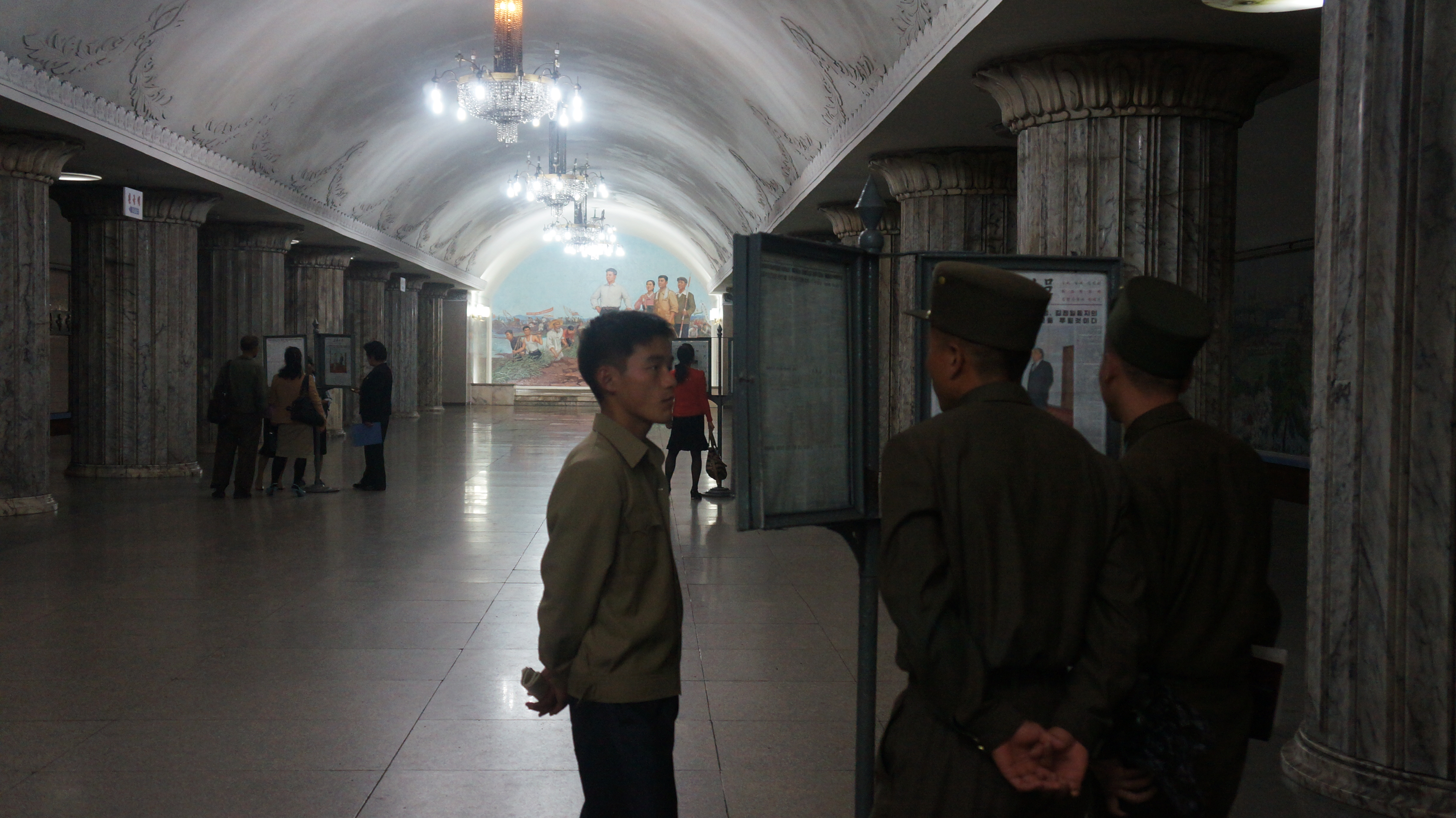

General information
- Location: Potonggang-guyok, Pyongyang; Democratic People's Republic of Korea
- Coordinates: 39°1′57″N 125°42′38.5″E
- Platforms: 1
- Tracks: 2
- Connections: Potonggang Station; Pyongyang Tram Line 1

History
- Opened: 9 September 1978

Services
Preceding station	Pyongyang Metro	Following station
Kwangbok Terminus	Hyoksin Line	Hwanggumbol towards Ragwon
Location

Kŏn'guk Station (Korean: 건국역; Hanja: 建國驛) is a station on Hyŏksin Line of the Pyongyang Metro.

The station is located across from Potonggang Station, a railway station and freight hub with a marshaling yard.

The station features mural The River Pothong of Paradise.
