= Ryonggang County =

Ryonggang County 룡강군
- County

Korean transcription(s)
  - Chosŏn'gŭl: 룡강군
  - Hancha: 龍岡郡
  - McCune-Reischauer: Ryonggang-gun
  - Revised Romanization: Ryonggang-gun
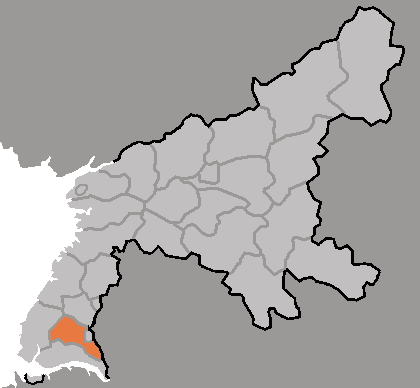
- Country: North Korea
- Province: South P'yongan
- Special City: Namp'o-tŭkpyŏlsi
- Administrative divisions: 1 ŭp, 10 ri

Area
  - Total: 1,200 km^{2} (460 sq mi)

Population (2008)
  - Total: 58,930
  - Density: 49/km^{2} (130/sq mi)

Ryonggang County is a county in South P'yŏngan province, North Korea. It is administered as a part of Namp'o Special City. It is famous for its local apples.

== Administrative divisions ==
Ryonggang-gun is divided into one town (ŭp) and 10 villages (ri):

- Ryonggang-ŭp (룡강읍; 龍岡邑)
- Aewŏl-li (애원리; 愛院里)
- Husal-li (후산리; 後山里)
- Okto-ri (옥도리; 玉桃里)
- P'osŏng-ri (포성리; 浦成里)
- Ripsong-ri (립송리; 立松里)
- Ryongho-ri (룡호리; 龍湖里)
- Ryonghŭng-ri (룡흥리; 龍興里)
- Samhwa-ri (삼화리; 三和里)
- Sŏngam-ri (성암리; 城岩里)
- Yanggong-ri (양곡리; 陽谷里)

== Transportation ==
Ryonggang County is served by the P'yŏngnam and Ryonggang lines of the Korean State Railway.

== See also ==
- Subdivisions of North Korea
- Geography of North Korea
