= Ryonggang Line =

Railway line in North Korea

Overview
- Native name: 룡강선(龍岡線)
- Status: Operational
- Owner: Chosen Government Railway (1937–1945); Korean State Railway (since 1945)
- Locale: Namp'o-t'ŭkpyŏlsi, South P'yŏngan
- Termini: Ryonggang; Mayŏng
- Stations: 5

Service
- Type: Heavy rail, Passenger & freight rail Regional rail
- Operator: Korean State Railway

History
- Opened: <1937

Technical
- Line length: 18.3 km (11.4 mi)
- Number of tracks: Single track
- Track gauge: 1,435 mm (4 ft 8 1/2 in) standard gauge
Route map
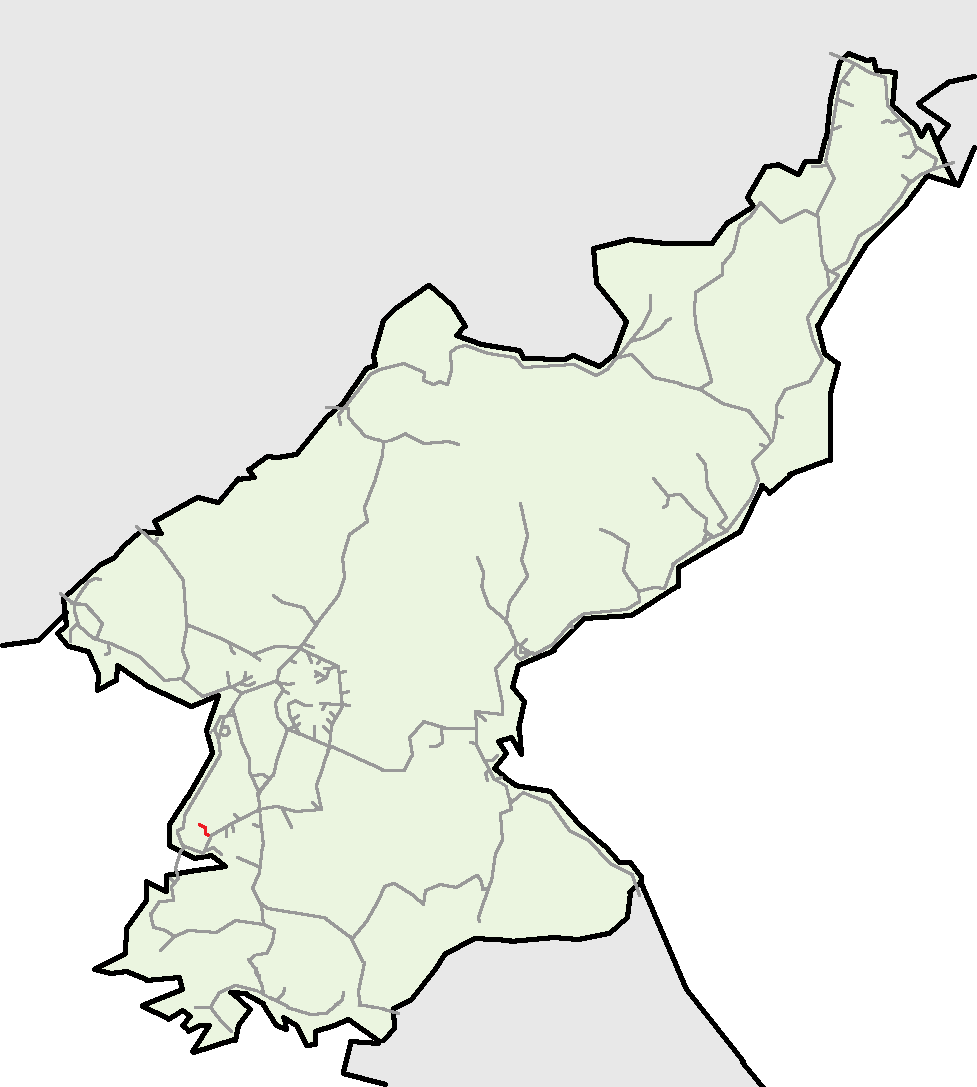

- Ryonggang Line
- Hangul: 룡강선
- Hanja: 龍岡線
- RR: Ryonggangseon
- MR: Ryonggangsŏn

The Ryonggang Line is a non-electrified standard-gauge secondary line of the Korean State Railway located entirely within Namp'o Special City, South P'yŏngan Province, North Korea, running from Ryonggang on the P'yŏngnam Line to Mayŏng. The line connects to the Husan Line to Yangmak at Husan.

== History ==
The Ryonggang Line was originally opened as the Yonggang Line by the Chosen Government Railway (Sentetsu) prior to 1937.

== Services ==
=== Freight ===
Most freight on the line is outbound from a mine at Mayŏng and a granite quarry on the Husan Line.

=== Passenger ===
A local train, 734, operates on the entirety of this line from Mayŏng to Ryonggang, continuing on to Kangsŏ on the P'yŏngnam Line, with a scheduled travel time of two hours fifteen minutes according to the 2002 timetable; the return trip is train number 733, taking two hours to make the trip.

== Route ==
A yellow background in the "Distance" box indicates that section of the line is not electrified.

Distance (km)		Station Name		Former Name		
Total	S2S	Transcribed	Chosŏn'gŭl (Hanja)	Transcribed	Chosŏn'gŭl (Hanja)	Connections
0.0	0.0	Ryonggang	룡강 (龍岡)	Chinjidong	진지동 (眞池洞)	P'yŏngnam Line
5.5	5.5	Ryongho	룡호 (龍湖)			
10.8	5.3	Husan	후산 (後山)			Husan Line
14.6	3.8	Ryongwŏl	령월 (龍月)			
18.3	3.7	Mayŏng	마영 (麻永)			
