= Pyongnam Onchon station =

Railway station in North Korea

P'yŏngnam Onch'ŏn 평남온천

Korean name
- Hangul: 평남온천역
- Hanja: 平南温泉驛
- Revised Romanization: Pyeongnam Oncheon-yeok
- McCune–Reischauer: P'yŏngnam Onch'ŏn-yŏk

General information
- Location: Onch'ŏn-ŭp, Onch'ŏn-gun, Namp'o-tŭkpyŏlsi; North Korea
- Coordinates: 38.8815°N 125.2240°E
- Owner: Korean State Railway
- Platforms: 1
- Tracks: 3

History
- Opened: July 1938
- Original company: Chosen P'yŏngan Railway

Services
Preceding station	Korean State Railway	Following station
Terminus	P'yŏngnam Line	Kwisŏng towards Namp'o
Ansŏk towards Namdong	Namdong Line	Terminus
Location

P'yŏngnam Onch'ŏn station is a railway station in Onch'ŏn-ŭp, Onch'ŏn county, Namp'o Special City, North Korea, the northern terminus of the P'yŏngnam Line of the Korean State Railway; it was also the southern terminus of the now-closed Namdong Line.

== History ==
The station was opened by the Chosen P'yŏngan Railway (Japanese: 朝鮮平安鉄道, Chōsen Heian Tetsudō; Korean: 조선평안철도, Chosŏn P'yŏngan Ch'ŏldo) in July 1938 as part of a 34.7 km (21.6 mi)-long line from Namp'o.

== Services ==
Regional passenger trains operate between this station and Tŏkch'ŏn on the P'yŏngdŏk Line (trains 226-227/228-229) and Pot'onggang on the P'yŏngnam Line (trains 225/230). This station also handles local freight traffic – daily-use commodities inbound, and salt and agricultural products outbound – and serves the Onch'ŏn air base of the Korean People's Army Air Force via a short spur.
