= Potonggang station =

Railway station in North Korea

Coordinates: 39°01′52″N 125°42′35″E

Pot'onggang 보통강

Korean name
- Hangul: 보통강역
- Hanja: 普通江驛
- Revised Romanization: Botonggang-yeok
- McCune–Reischauer: Pot'onggang-yŏk

General information
- Location: Pulg'ŭn'gori 1-dong, Pot'onggang-guyŏk, P'yŏngyang; North Korea
- Owner: Korean State Railway
- Platforms: 3 (1 island)
- Tracks: 4
- Connections: Hyŏksin Line (Kŏn'guk station); Pyongyang Tram Line 1

History
- Opened: 21 March 1944
- Original company: Chosen Government Railway

Services
| Preceding station | Korean State Railway | Following station |
|---|---|---|
| P'yŏngyang Terminus | P'yŏngnam Line | Ch'ilgol towards Namp'o |
| Terminus | P'yŏngyanghwajŏn Line | P'yŏngyang Chocha'jang towards P'yŏngch'ŏn |
Location

Pot'onggang station is a railway station in Pulg'ŭn'gori 1-dong, Pot'onggang-guyŏk, P'yŏngyang, North Korea, on the P'yŏngnam Line of the Korean State Railway.

It is also the starting point of the P'yŏngyanghwajŏn Line to P'yŏngyang's marshalling yard, P'yŏngyang Choch'ajang; from there the line splits, with a branch going to the P'yŏngyang Thermal Power Plant, and another to P'yŏngch'ŏn station and a number of industries in the area. There are sidings for loading freight from a number of freight houses on the south side of the station.

== History ==
The station was opened together with the marshalling yard on 21 March 1944 by the Chosen Government Railway.

== Services ==
Local transit transfers can be made from Pot'onggang station to the Pyongyang Metro's Kŏn'guk station on the Hyŏksin Line, and to P'yŏngyang Tram Line 1.
