= Chōsen Pyeongan Railway =

Railway company in colonial Korea

Chōsen Pyeongan Railway Co. Ltd.

Overview
- Native name: 조선평안철도도주식회사 (Joseon Pyeongan Cheoldo Jusikhoesa) 朝鮮平安鉄道株式會社 (Chōsen Heian Tetsudō Kabushiki Kaisha)

The Chōsen Pyeongan Railway (Japanese: 朝鮮平安鉄道株式會社, Hepburn: Chōsen Heian Tetsudō Kabushiki Kaisha, Korean: 조선평안철도주식회사; RR: Joseon Pyeongan Cheoldo Jusikhoesa) was a privately owned railway company in Japanese-occupied Korea.

== History ==
On 8 July 1938, the Chōsen Pyeongan Railway opened the 34.7 km (21.6 mi) Oncheon Line from Jinnampo, terminus of the Chosen Government Railway's Pyeongnam Line, to Yonggang Oncheon, running passenger trains to serve the hot springs there.

After the partition of Korea the line was within the territory of the DPRK, and was nationalised by the Provisional People’s Committee for North Korea along with all other railways in the Soviet zone of occupation on 10 August 1946, to be operated by the Korean State Railway, which merged the Oncheon Line into the Pyeongnam Line.

== Services ==
Two trains stopping at every station were listed in the 1945 timetable, one from Botonggang Station in suburban Pyongyang, and the other from Deokcheon on the West Chosen Central Railway's Seoseon Line. The reason for needing a train connecting these two cities is unclear. However, the train left Deokcheon at 3:12 PM, arriving at Oncheon at 2:45 AM the next morning; then, it departed Oncheon at 4:05 AM, arriving at Botonggang at 8:55 AM before returning to Oncheon and thence to Deokcheon.

== Route ==
温泉線 - 온천선 - Onsen Line - Oncheon Line
| Distance | | Station name | | | | |
| Total; km | S2S; km | Transcribed, Korean | Transcribed, Japanese | Hunminjeongeum | Hanja/Kanji | Connections |
|---|---|---|---|---|---|---|
| 0.0 | 3.3 | Jinnampo | Chin'nanpo | 진남포 | 鎮南浦 | Sentetsu Pyeongnam Line |
| 7.0 | 7.0 | Haesan | Kaizan | 해산 | 海山 | |
| 9.4 | 2.4 | Deokdong | Tokutō | 덕동 | 徳洞 | |
| 13.8 | 4.4 | Pyeongnam Sindeok | Heinanshintoku | 평남신덕 | 平南新徳 | |
| 18.5 | 4.7 | Donggwangnyang | Higashikōryō | 동광량 | 東広梁 | |
| 20.7 | 2.2 | Seogwangnyang | Nishikōryō | 서광량 | 西広梁 | |
| 23.4 | 2.7 | Hwado | Katō | 화도 | 花島 | |
| 25.9 | 2.5 | Nosang | Rojō | 노상 | 路上 | |
| 29.8 | 3.9 | Gwiseong | Kijō | 귀성 | 貴城 | |
| 34.7 | 4.9 | Yonggang Oncheon | Ryōkōonsen | 용강온천 | 龍岡温泉 | |
