= Onchon County =

Onch'ŏn County 온천군
- County

Korean transcription(s)
  - Chosŏn'gŭl: 온천군
  - Hancha: 溫泉郡
  - McCune-Reischauer: Onch'ŏn-gun
  - Revised Romanization: Oncheon-gun
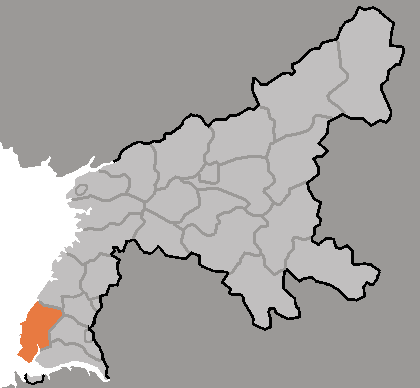
- Country: North Korea
- Province: South P'yŏngan
- Special City: Namp'o-tŭkpyŏlsi
- Administrative divisions: 1 ŭp, 5 workers' districts, 14 ri

Area
  - Total: 772 km^{2} (298 sq mi)

Population (2008)
  - Total: 149,851
  - Density: 194/km^{2} (503/sq mi)

Onch'ŏn County is a county in South P'yŏngan province, North Korea. It is administered as part of Namp'o Special City.

== Administrative divisions ==
Onch'ŏn county is divided into 1 ŭp (town), 5 rodongjagu (workers' districts) and 14 ri (villages):

- Onch'ŏn-ŭp (온천읍)
- Chŭng'ang-rodongjagu (증악로동자구)
- Kwisŏng-rodongjagu (귀성로동자구)
- Mayŏng-rodongjagu (마영로동자구)
- Porim-rodongjagu (보림로동자구)
- Wŏn'ŭp-rodongjagu (원읍로동자구)
- Ansŏng-ri (안석리)
- Hanhyŏl-li (한현리)
- Kŭmsŏng-ri (금성리)
- Kŭmgong-ri (금곡리)
- Kŭmdang-ri (금당리)
- Ryongwŏl-li (룡월리)
- Sŏhwa-ri (서화리)
- Sŏkch'i-ri (석치리)
- Sŏnghyŏl-li (성현리)
- Sŭnghyŏl-li (송현리)
- Taeryŏng-ri (대령리)
- Ŭndŏng-ri (은덕리)
- Unha-ri (운하리)
- Ŭnjŏng-ri (은정리)

== Transportation ==
Onch'ŏn county is served by the P'yŏngnam and Ryonggang lines of the Korean State Railway.
