= Hanggu-guyok =

Hanggu Ward 항구구역
- Wards

Korean transcription(s)
  - Chosŏn'gŭl: 항구구역
  - Hancha: 港口區域
  - McCune-Reischauer: Hanggu-guyŏk
  - Revised Romanization: Hanggu-guyeok
- Interactive map of Hanggu Ward
- Coordinates: 38°45′52″N 125°27′49″E
- Country: North Korea
- Province: South P'yŏngan
- Special City: Namp'o-tŭkpyŏlsi
- Administrative divisions: 18 tong, 10 ri

Hanggu-guyŏk is a kuyŏk in Namp'o Special City, South P'yŏngan province, North Korea.

Choe Thae-bok, former chairman of the Supreme People's Assembly from 1998 to 2019 , was born in Hanggu-guyŏk.

== Administrative divisions ==
Hanggu-guyŏk is divided into 18 neighbourhoods (tong) and 10 villages (ri).

	Chosŏn'gŭl	Hancha
Chungbisŏk-tong	중비석동	中碑石洞
Chungdaedu-dong	중대두동	中大頭洞
Habisŏk-tong	하비석동	下碑石洞
Hadaedu-dong	하대두동	下大頭洞
Handu-dong	한두동	漢頭洞
Haean-dong	해안동	海岸洞
Hanggu-dong	항구동	港口洞
Hup'o-dong	후포동	後浦洞
Kŏn'guk 1-dong	건국1동	建國1洞
Kŏn'guk 2-dong	건국2동	建國2洞
Munae-dong	문애동	文艾洞
Munhwa-dong	문화동	文化洞
Ryusa-dong	류사동	柳沙洞
Sangbisŏk-tong	상비석동	上碑石洞
Sangdaedu-dong	상대두동	上大頭洞
Sŏnch'ang-dong	선창동	仙倉洞
Ŭndŏk-tong	은덕동	恩德洞
Yŏkch'ŏn-dong	역전동	驛前洞
Chisa-ri	지사리	芝沙里
Chodo-ri	초도리	椒島里
Kalchŏl-li	갈천리	葛川里
Kŏmsal-li	검산리	檢山里
Ŏho-ri	어호리	漁湖里
Sinhŭng-ri	신흥리	新興里
Toji-ri	도지리	島智里
Tŏkhae-ri	덕해리	德海里
Tongjŏl-li	동전리	東箭里
Usal-li	우산리	牛山里

== Transportation ==
Hanggu district is served by the P'yŏngnam Line of the Korean State Railway.
