= Nampo station (Pyongnam Line) =

Railway station in North Korea

Namp'o 남포

Korean name
- Hangul: 남포역
- Hanja: 南浦驛
- Revised Romanization: Nampo-yeok
- McCune–Reischauer: Namp'o-yŏk

General information
- Location: Hanggu-guyŏk, Namp'o-tŭkpyŏlsi; North Korea
- Coordinates: 38.7338°N 125.4123°E
- Owner: Korean State Railway
- Platforms: 3 (1 island)
- Tracks: 9

History
- Opened: 16 October 1910
- Former names: Chinnamp'o station Chosŏn'gŭl: 진남포역; Hanja: 鎮南浦駅
- Original company: Chosen Government Railway

Services
| Preceding station | Korean State Railway | Following station |
|---|---|---|
| Sinnamp'o towards P'yŏngyang | P'yŏngnam Line | Terminus |
| Sinnamp'o towards P'yŏngnam Onch'ŏn | P'yŏngnam Line | Terminus |
| Terminus | Tojiri Line | Tojiri Terminus |
Location

Namp'o station is a railway station in Hanggu-guyŏk, Namp'o Special City, North Korea on the P'yŏngnam Line of the Korean State Railway, as well as the starting point of the Tojiri Line. There is an engine house northwest of the station in Munhwa-dong, Hanggu-guyŏk.

== History ==
Originally called Chinnamp'o station, it was opened by the Chosen Government Railway, along with the rest of the mainline of the P'yŏngnam Line, on 16 October 1910.

In July 1938, the Chosen P'yŏngan Railway (Japanese: 朝鮮平安鉄道, Chōsen Heian Tetsudō; Korean: 조선평안철도, Chosŏn P'yŏngan Ch'ŏldo) opened a 34.7 km (21.6 mi)-long line from Namp'o to P'yŏngnam Onch'ŏn to serve the hot springs there.

In December 2022, a new station building was completed.

== Services ==
This station serves North Korea's busiest port in terms of international import-export shipping, as well as the Namp'o base of the Korean People's Navy and a coal loading dock.

A number of passenger trains also serve the station. These are:

- Semi-express trains 146-147/148-149 between Sinŭiju Ch'ŏngnyŏn on the P'yŏngŭi Line and Namp'o via P'yŏngyang;
- Regional trains 226-227/228-229 between Tŏkch'ŏn on the P'yŏngdŏk Line and P'yŏngnam Onch'ŏn via P'yŏngyang and Namp'o;
- Regional trains 225/230 between Potonggang and P'yŏngnam Onch'ŏn via Namp'o;
- Regional trains 240-241/242-243 between Haeju Ch'ŏngnyŏn on the Hwanghae Ch'ŏngnyŏn Line and Namp'o via P'yŏngyang.
- Local trains 361/362, operating between Namp'o and Ch'ŏlgwang, running from Namp'o to Sillyŏngri on the P'yŏngnam Line and continuing to Ch'ŏlgwang via the Sŏhae Kammun Line.

Due to the poor state of the tracks, at present the travel time for trains between P'yŏngyang and Namp'o is around three hours.
