= Pyongnam Line =

Railway line in North Korea

P'yŏngnam Line

Overview
- Native name: 평남선(平南線)
- Owner: Chosen Gov't Railway (P'yŏngnam Line, 1910–1945); Chosen P'yŏngan Railway (Onch'ŏn Line, 1938–1945); Korean State Railway (since 1945)
- Locale: P'yŏngyang; South P'yŏngan; Namp'o
- Termini: P'yŏngyang; P'yŏngnam Onch'ŏn, Namp'o
- Stations: 18

Service
- Type: Heavy rail, Regional rail Passenger/Freight

History
- Opened: P'yŏngyang–Namp'o: 16 October 1910; Namp'o–P'yŏngnam Onch'ŏn: 8 July 1938

Technical
- Line length: 89.9 km (55.9 mi)
- Number of tracks: Single track
- Track gauge: 1,435 mm (4 ft 8 1/2 in) standard gauge
- Electrification: 3000 V DC Catenary (P'yŏngyang - Namp'o)
Route map
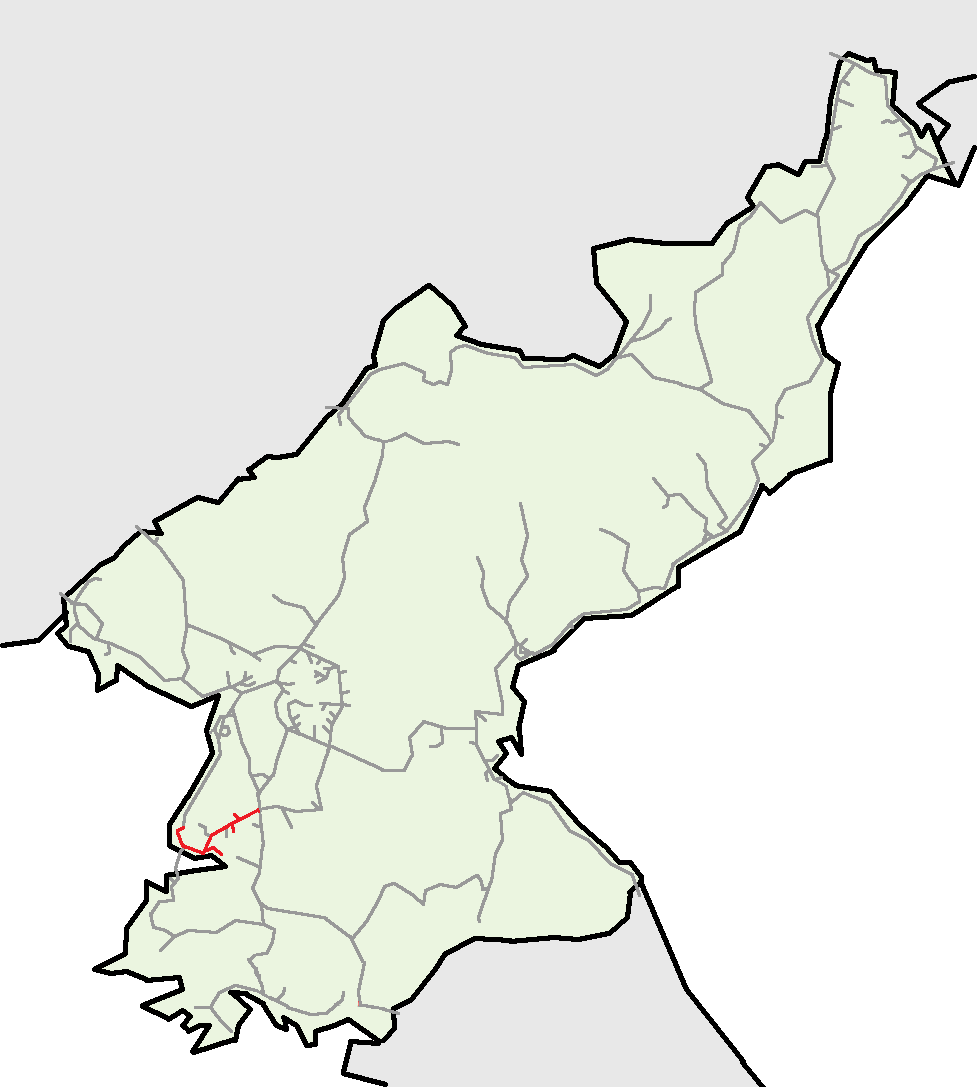

- Pyongnam Line
- Hangul: 평남선
- Hanja: 平南線
- RR: Pyeongnamseon
- MR: P'yŏngnamsŏn

The P'yŏngnam Line is an electrified standard-gauge trunk line of the Korean State Railway in North Korea, linking P'yŏngyang with the port city of Namp'o and the hot springs at P'yŏngnam Onch'ŏn. The length of the line is 89.9 km (55.9 mi).

The P'yŏngnam Line serves as a connection between the various trunk lines starting at P'yŏngyang that serve the north and east of the country with the lines in the southwestern part of North Korea by means of a connection to the Sŏhae Kammun Line (West Sea Barrage Line). It connects to the Ryonggang Line and the Taean Line, as well as to the P'yŏngyanghwajŏn Line, the Chamjilli Line, the Posan Line, the Tojiri Line, the Namp'o Port Line, and, formerly, the Namdong Line.

== History ==
The P'yŏngnam Line was originally built as two separate lines by two separate railway companies - the P'yŏngnam Line built by the Chosen Government Railway (Sentetsu), and the Onch'ŏn Line built by the privately owned Chosen P'yŏngan Railway.

=== P'yŏngnam Line, 1909–1945 ===
In September 1909, Sentetsu began construction of a rail line running between P'yŏngyang and Chinnamp'o (nowadays Namp'o). Called the P'yŏngnam Line, it was opened for operations on 16 October 1910.

In the following years, a number of stations were opened along the line to expand the service: Kangsŏn Station on 1 July 1923; Kalch'ŏn Station on 1 May 1924; Taesŏng Station, 35.2 km (21.9 mi) from P'yŏngyang between Kangsŏ and Ryonggang, was opened on 1 November 1925 and subsequently closed; Choch'on station was opened on 11 February 1934, but a year later was dismantled and moved 1.2 km (0.75 mi) south, becoming today's Ch'ilgol Station; Taep'o Station, 13.3 km (8.3 mi) from P'yŏngyang Station between Choch'on and Taep'yŏng Stations in Man'gyŏngdae-guyŏk, P'yŏngyang, was opened on 10 January 1944 and subsequently closed; and Pot'onggang Station on 21 March 1944.

=== Onch'ŏn Line, 1938–1945 ===
On 8 July 1938, the Chosen P'yŏngan Railway opened the 34.7 km (21.6 mi) Onch'ŏn Line from Chinnamp'o, terminus of Sentetsu's P'yŏngnam Line, to Ryonggang Onch'ŏn, running two daily passenger trains to connect the hot springs there with Pot'onggang Station in P'yŏngyang and with Tŏkch'ŏn on the West Chosen Central Railway's Seoseon Line.

=== Since 1945 ===
After the partition of Korea, the two lines were within the Soviet zone of occupation, and both lines - together with all others within the Soviet zone - were nationalised by the Provisional People’s Committee for North Korea on 10 August 1946, and operated by the Korean State Railway following the establishment of the DPRK, which merged the Onch'ŏn Line into the P'yŏngnam Line. The line was heavily damaged during the Korean War, but was subsequently rebuilt and expanded, with the construction of Sinnamp'o Station to serve glass factories and shipbuilders located there.

The mainline between P'yŏngyang and Namp'o was electrified in December 1979.

After the completion of the West Sea Barrage in 1986, a new rail line, the Sŏhae Kammun Line was opened, running from Sillyŏngri on the P'yŏngnam Line to Ch'ŏlgwang on the Ŭnnyul Line.

== Modernisation ==
On 21 October 2014 a groundbreaking ceremony for the Sŭngri ("Victory") project to modernise the P'yŏngnam Line from Namp'o to P'yŏngyang and the P'yŏngdŏk Line from P'yŏngyang to Chaedong was held. The project, supported by Russia, is intended to form the first stage of a larger-scale cooperation with the Russian Railways as part of a 20-year development project that would modernise around 3,500 km (2,200 mi) of the North Korean rail network, and would include the construction of a north-south freight bypass around P'yŏngyang.

The overall project cost is estimated to be around US $25 billion, and it is expected that exports of coal, rare-earth and non-ferrous metals from the DPRK to Russia will provide the funding for the project.

== Services ==
=== Freight ===
A wide array of industries along the mainline of the P'yŏngnam Line are all served by freight trains, and import-export traffic through Namp'o Port - North Korea's largest in terms of traffic - is also moved by rail along this line.

The Ch'ŏllima Steel Complex at Kangsŏn, the DPRK's largest steel mill, produces steel and other alloys; a good portion of this output is sent to industries elsewhere on the P'yŏngnam Line.

The Kŭmsŏng Tractor Factory at Kangsŏ produces tractors and other agricultural equipment for both domestic use and export, using structural steel supplied from the Sŏngjin Steel Works and the Ch'ŏllima Steel Complex and plate steel from the Hwanghae Iron & Steel Complex.

All freight heading to and from the Taean Machine Complex located in Taean on the adjoining Taean Line moves via the P'yŏngnam Line. Steel arrives there from the Kimchaek Iron & Steel Complex, the Hwanghae Iron & Steel Complex and the Ch'ŏllima Steel Complex, nonferrous metals from the Munp'yŏng Smelter, and imported materials and parts unloaded from ships at Namp'o Port.

There is a significant amount of short-distance freight traffic between Kangsŏn and the Posan Line via Kangsŏ: the April 13 Ironworks, located at Posan, produces pig iron that is all shipped to the Ch'ŏllima Steel Complex; the ironworks receives some of its raw material via rail, as well.

Other rail-served industries on the line include, among others, the P'yŏngyang Wheat Flour Factory at Ch'ilgol in Samhŭng-dong, Man'gyŏngdae-guyŏk in P'yŏngyang; and the Pyeonghwa Motors factory and the Ch'ŏnji Lubricant Factory at Sinnamp'o. There are also numerous rail-served factories on the connecting lines.

The section from Sinnamp'o to P'yŏngnam Onch'ŏn serves a primarily agricultural area. There are freight loading facilities at East Kwangryang, Rosang, Kwisŏng and P'yŏngnam Onch'ŏn. The bulk of outbound freight traffic on this section is salt and agricultural products; inbound traffic consists primarily of coal, anthracite, fertiliser and goods for everyday use. There is also a significant amount of military traffic along this line, destined for the Onch'ŏn air base of the Korean People's Army Air Force just north of P'yŏngnam Onch'ŏn.

=== Passenger ===
A number of long-distance and local passenger trains run along the P'yŏngnam Line, serving the city of Namp'o as well as the hot springs at P'yŏngnam Onch'ŏn.

Four passenger trains operate over the entirety of the mainline. These are semi-express trains 146-147/148-149 between Sinŭiju Ch'ŏngnyŏn on the P'yŏngŭi Line and Namp'o via P'yŏngyang; regional trains 226-227/228-229 between Tŏkch'ŏn on the P'yŏngdŏk Line and P'yŏngnam Onch'ŏn; regional trains 225/230 between Potonggang and P'yŏngnam Onch'ŏn; and regional trains 240-241/242-243 between Haeju Ch'ŏngnyŏn on the Hwanghae Ch'ŏngnyŏn Line and Namp'o via P'yŏngyang.

Other passenger trains on the line include local trains 361/362, operating between Namp'o and Ch'ŏlgwang, running from Namp'o to Sillyŏngri and continuing to Ch'ŏlgwang via the Sŏhae Kammun Line, and local trains 733/734, operating between Kangsŏ and Mayŏng on the Ryonggang Line via Ryonggang.

Due to the poor state of the tracks, as of 2007 the travel time for trains between P'yŏngyang and Namp'o was around three hours; in comparison, in 1920 the six daily trips between P'yŏngyang and Namp'o took 1 hour 40 minutes each way.

== Route ==
A yellow background in the "Distance" box indicates that section of the line is not electrified.

Distance (km)		Station Name		Former Name		
Total	S2S	Transcribed	Chosŏn'gŭl (Hanja)	Transcribed	Chosŏn'gŭl (Hanja)	Connections (Closed)
0.0	0.0	P'yŏngyang	평양 (平壤)			P'yŏngŭi Line, P'yŏngdŏk Line, ● Ch'ŏllima Line Yŏnggwang Station ● Tram Line 1
3.9	3.9	Pot'onggang	보통강 (普通江)			P'yŏngyanghwajŏn Line ● Hyŏksin Line Kŏn'guk Station ● Tram Line 1
~~7.5~~	~~3.6~~	Choch'ŏn	조천 (趙村)			Closed 1935
8.7	4.8	Ch'ilgol	칠골 (-)	Choch'ŏn	조천 (趙村)	● Hyŏksin Line Ch'ilgol Station (planned) ● Tram Line 1 P'yŏngyang Wheat Flour Factory; Distance from Pot'onggang
~~13.3~~	~~4.6~~	Taep'o	대포 (大寶)			Closed
15.8	7.1	Taep'yŏng	대평 (大平)			Distance from Ch'ilgol
23.1	7.3	Kangsŏn (Ch'ŏllima)	강선 (降仙) (천리마 (千里馬))			Chamjilli Line; Ch'ŏllima Steel Complex
28.3	5.2	Kangsŏ	강서 (江西)	Kiyang	기양 (岐陽)	Tae'an Line, Posan Line; Kŭmsŏng Tractor Factory
35.2	6.9	T'aesŏng	태성 (台城)			
40.7	5.5	Ryonggang	룡강 (龍岡)	Chinjidong	진지동 (眞池洞)	Ryonggang Line
~~42.7~~	~~2.0~~	Chinji	진지 (眞池)			Closed
47.6	6.9	Kalch'ŏn	갈천 (葛川)			
54.9	7.3	Sinnamp'o	신남포 (新南浦)			Namp'ohang Line; Pyeonghwa Motors
57.3	3.3	Namp'o	남포 (南浦)	Chinnamp'o	진남포 (鎭南浦)	Tojiri Line; Namp'o container port
~~61.6~~	~~6.7~~	Haesan	해산 (海山)			Closed; Distance from Sinnamp'o
64.0	2.4	Tŏktong	덕동 (德洞)			
68.4	4.4	Sillyŏngri	신령리 (新寧里)	P'yŏngnam Sindŏk	평남신덕 (平南新德)	Sŏhae Kammun Line
73.1	4.7	East Kwangryang (Tonggwangryang)	동광량 (東廣梁)			
75.3	2.2	West Kwangryang (Sŏgwangryang)	서광량 (西廣梁)			
78.0	2.7	Hwado	화도 (花島)			
80.5	2.5	Rosang	로상 (路上)	Nosang	노상 (路上)	
84.4	3.9	Kwisŏng	귀성 (貴城)			
89.3	4.9	P'yŏngnam Onch'ŏn	평남온천 (平南溫泉)	Yonggang Onch'ŏn	용강온천 (龍岡溫泉)	(Namdong Line – closed); Onch'ŏn air base
