= Ryongnam station =

Railway station in North Korea

Ryongnam 령남

Korean name
- Hangul: 령남역
- Hanja: 嶺南驛
- Revised Romanization: Ryongnam-yeok
- McCune–Reischauer: Ryongnam-yŏk

General information
- Location: Ryongnam-rodonjagu, Unhŭng, Ryanggang; North Korea
- Coordinates: 41.283°N 128.643°E
- Owner: Korean State Railway

History
- Opened: 1 September 1935; 90 years ago

Services
Preceding station	Korean State Railway	Following station
Namjung towards Hyesan Ch'ŏngnyŏn	Paektusan Ch'ŏngnyŏn Line	Ryŏngha towards Kilju Ch'ŏngnyŏn
Location

Ryongnam station is a railway station in Ryongnam-rodongjagu, Unhŭng county, Ryanggang province, North Korea, on the Paektusan Ch'ŏngnyŏn Line of the Korean State Railway.

The station, along with the rest of the Paegam–Pongdu-ri section, was opened by the Government Railways of Chosen (朝鮮総督府鉄道) on 1 September 1935.

On 9 October 2006 an underground nuclear test was conducted at P'unggye-ri in Kilju County, causing the closure of the line for 3–4 months.
