= Namjung station =

Railway station in North Korea

Namjung 남중

Korean name
- Hangul: 남중역
- Hanja: 南中驛
- Revised Romanization: Namjung-yeok
- McCune–Reischauer: Namjung-yŏk

General information
- Location: Namjung-rodongjagu, Unhŭng, Ryanggang; North Korea
- Coordinates: 41.2856°N 128.5916°E
- Owner: Korean State Railway

History
- Opened: 1 September 1935; 90 years ago
- Former names: Chosen Government Railway

Services
Preceding station	Korean State Railway	Following station
Saengjang towards Hyesan Ch'ŏngnyŏn	Paektusan Ch'ŏngnyŏn Line	Ryŏngnam towards Kilju Ch'ŏngnyŏn
Location

Namjung station is a railway station in Namjung-rodongjagu, Unhŭng county, Ryanggang province, North Korea, on the Paektusan Ch'ŏngnyŏn Line of the Korean State Railway.

The station, along with the rest of the Paegam–Pongdu-ri section, was opened by the Chosen Government Railway on 1 September 1935.

On 9 October 2006 an underground nuclear test was conducted at P'unggye-ri in Kilju County, causing the closure of the line for 3–4 months.
