= Wiyon Chongnyon station =

Railway station in North Korea

Wiyŏn Ch'ŏngnyŏn 위연청년

Korean name
- Hangul: 위연청년역
- Hanja: 渭淵靑年驛
- Revised Romanization: Wiyeon-yeok
- McCune–Reischauer: Wiyŏn-yŏk

General information
- Location: Wiyŏn-dong, Hyesan-si, Ryanggang; North Korea
- Coordinates: 41.4188°N 128.2116°E
- Owner: Korean State Railway

History
- Opened: 1 November 1937; 88 years ago
- Original company: Chosen Government Railway

Services
Preceding station	Korean State Railway	Following station
Hyesan Ch'ŏngnyŏn Terminus	Paektusan Ch'ŏngnyŏn Line	Kŏmsalli towards Kilju Ch'ŏngnyŏn
Hwajŏn towards Motka	Samjiyŏn Line	Terminus
Location

Wiyŏn Ch'ŏngnyŏn station is a railway station in Wiyŏn-dong, greater Hyesan city, Ryanggang province, North Korea, on the Paektusan Ch'ŏngnyŏn Line of the Korean State Railway. It is also the starting point of the narrow-gauge Samjiyŏn line.

== History ==
The station, along with the rest of the Pongdu-ri–Hyesanjin section, was opened by the Chosen Government Railway on 1 November 1937.

On 9 October 2006 an underground nuclear test was conducted at P'unggye-ri in Kilju County, causing the closure of the line for 3–4 months.

== Services ==
There is a large sawmill here that processes logs shipped by rail from the Paengmu narrow-gauge line via Paegam, and processed lumber is shipped from here to other destinations. Passenger trains run along the Samjiyŏn line to meet with trains running between Hyesan and Kilju.
