= Sado station =

Railway station in North Korea

Sado 사도

Korean name
- Hangul: 사도역
- Hanja: 蛇島驛
- Revised Romanization: Sado-yeok
- McCune–Reischauer: Sado-yŏk

General information
- Location: Paegam, Ryanggang; North Korea
- Coordinates: 41.1568°N 128.9807°E
- Owner: Korean State Railway

History
- Opened: 1 November 1933; 92 years ago

Services
Preceding station	Korean State Railway	Following station
Yanggok towards Hyesan Ch'ŏngnyŏn	Paektusan Ch'ŏngnyŏn Line	Sŏngdŏk towards Kilju Ch'ŏngnyŏn
Location

Sado station is a railway station in Paegam county, Ryanggang province, North Korea, on the Paektusan Ch'ŏngnyŏn Line of the Korean State Railway.

The station, along with the rest of the Kilju–Hapsu section, was opened by the Government Railways of Chosen(朝鮮総督府鉄道) on 1 November 1933.

On 9 October 2006 an underground nuclear test was conducted at P'unggye-ri in Kilju County, causing the closure of the line for 3–4 months.
