= Ryongha station =

Railway station in North Korea

Ryŏngha 령하

Korean name
- Hangul: 령하역
- Hanja: 嶺下驛
- Revised Romanization: Ryeongha-yeok
- McCune–Reischauer: Ryŏngha-yŏk

General information
- Location: Ryŏngha-rodongjagu, Unhŭng, Ryanggang; North Korea
- Coordinates: 41°16′19″N 128°41′48″E
- Owner: Korean State Railway

History
- Opened: 1 September 1935; 90 years ago

Services
Preceding station	Korean State Railway	Following station
Ryŏngnam towards Hyesan Ch'ŏngnyŏn	Paektusan Ch'ŏngnyŏn Line	Paegam Ch'ŏngnyŏn towards Kilju Ch'ŏngnyŏn
Location

Ryŏngha station is a railway station in Ryŏngha-rodongjagu, Unhŭng county, Ryanggang province, North Korea, on the Paektusan Ch'ŏngnyŏn Line of the Korean State Railway.

The station, along with the rest of the Paegam–Pongdu-ri section, was opened by the Government Railways of Chosen (朝鮮総督府鉄道) on 1 September 1935.

On 9 October 2006, an underground nuclear test was conducted at P'unggye-ri in Kilju County, causing the closure of the line for 3–4 months.
