= Poan station =

Railway station in North Korea

Poan 보안

Korean name
- Hangul: 보안역
- Hanja: 甫安驛
- Revised Romanization: Boan-yeok
- McCune–Reischauer: Poan-yŏk

General information
- Location: Simp'o-ri, Unhŭng, Ryanggang; North Korea
- Coordinates: 41.3406°N 128.4381°E
- Owner: Korean State Railway

History
- Opened: 1 November 1937; 88 years ago

Services
Preceding station	Korean State Railway	Following station
Simp'ori towards Hyesan Ch'ŏngnyŏn	Paektusan Ch'ŏngnyŏn Line	Unhŭng towards Kilju Ch'ŏngnyŏn
Location

Poan station (Korean: 보안역) is a railway station in Poanso, Simp'o-ri, Unhŭng county, Ryanggang province, North Korea, on the Paektusan Ch'ŏngnyŏn Line of the Korean State Railway.

The station, along with the rest of the Pongduri–Hyesanjin section, was opened by the Government Railways of Chosen (朝鮮総督府鉄道) on 1 November 1937.

On 9 October 2006 an underground nuclear test was conducted at P'unggye-ri in Kilju County, causing the closure of the line for 3–4 months.
