= Komsalli station =

Railway station in North Korea

Kŏmsalli 검산리

Korean name
- Hangul: 검산리역
- Hanja: 剣山里驛
- Revised Romanization: Geomsalli-yeok
- McCune–Reischauer: Kŏmsalli-yŏk

General information
- Location: Kŏmsan-dong, Hyesan-si, Ryanggang; North Korea
- Coordinates: 41.4233°N 128.2604°E
- Owner: Korean State Railway

History
- Opened: 1 November 1937; 88 years ago
- Former names: Chosen Government Railway

Services
Preceding station	Korean State Railway	Following station
Wiyŏn towards Hyesan Ch'ŏngnyŏn	Paektusan Ch'ŏngnyŏn Line	Taeoch'ŏn towards Kilju Ch'ŏngnyŏn
Location

Kŏmsalli station is a railway station in Kŏmsan-dong, greater Hyesan city, Ryanggang province, North Korea, on the Paektusan Ch'ŏngnyŏn Line of the Korean State Railway.

The station, along with the rest of the Pongdu-ri-Hyesanjin- section, was opened by the Chosen Government Railway on 1 November 1937.

On 9 October 2006 an underground nuclear test was conducted at P'unggye-ri in Kilju County, causing the closure of the line for 3–4 months.

Operations at this station are primarily focussed on freight service.
