= Taeochon station =

Railway station in North Korea

Taeoch'ŏn 대오천

Korean name
- Hangul: 대오천역
- Hanja: 大五川驛
- Revised Romanization: Daeocheon-yeok
- McCune–Reischauer: Taeoch'ŏn-yŏk

General information
- Location: Taeosich'ŏl-lodongjagu, Unhŭng-gun, Ryanggang; North Korea
- Coordinates: 41.4263°N 128.3466°E
- Owner: Korean State Railway

History
- Opened: 1 November 1937; 88 years ago
- Original company: Chosen Government Railway

Services
Preceding station	Korean State Railway	Following station
Kŏmsalli towards Hyesan Ch'ŏngnyŏn	Paektusan Ch'ŏngnyŏn Line	Simp'ori towards Kilju Ch'ŏngnyŏn
Terminus	Osich'ŏn Line	Osich'ŏn Terminus
Location

Taeoch'ŏn station (Korean: 대오천역) is a railway station in Taeosich'ŏl-lodongjagu, Unhŭng county, Ryanggang province, North Korea, on the Paektusan Ch'ŏngnyŏn Line of the Korean State Railway; it is also the starting point of the Osich'ŏn Line to Osich'ŏn.

== History ==
The station, along with the rest of the Pongduri–Hyesanjin section of the Kilhye Line, was opened by the Chosen Government Railway on 1 November 1937.

On 9 October 2006 an underground nuclear test was conducted at P'unggye-ri in Kilju County, causing the closure of the line for 3–4 months.
