= Simpori station =

Railway station in North Korea

Simp'o-ri 심포리

Korean name
- Hangul: 심포리역
- Hanja: 深浦里驛
- Revised Romanization: Simpo-ri-yeok
- McCune–Reischauer: Simp'o-ri-yŏk

General information
- Location: Simp'o-ri, Unhŭng, Ryanggang; North Korea
- Coordinates: 41.3712°N 128.3798°E
- Owner: Korean State Railway

History
- Opened: 1 November 1937; 88 years ago

Services
Preceding station	Korean State Railway	Following station
Taeoch'ŏn towards Hyesan Ch'ŏngnyŏn	Paektusan Ch'ŏngnyŏn Line	Poan towards Kilju Ch'ŏngnyŏn
Location

Simp'o-ri station is a railway station in Simp'o-ri, Unhŭng county, Ryanggang province, North Korea, on the Paektusan Ch'ŏngnyŏn Line of the Korean State Railway.

The station, along with the rest of the Pongdu-ri–Hyesanjin section, was opened by the Government Railways of Chosen(朝鮮総督府鉄道) on 1 November 1937.

On 9 October 2006 an underground nuclear test was conducted at P'unggye-ri in Kilju County, causing the closure of the line for 3–4 months.

Talc, kaolin and magnesite are shipped from here.
