= Namsok station =

Railway station in North Korea

Namsŏk 남석

Korean name
- Hangul: 남석역
- Hanja: 南夕驛
- Revised Romanization: Namseok-yeok
- McCune–Reischauer: Namsŏk-yŏk

General information
- Location: Kilju, North Hamgyŏng; North Korea
- Coordinates: 41.0374°N 129.2643°E
- Owner: Korean State Railway

History
- Opened: 1 November 1933; 92 years ago

Services
| Preceding station | Korean State Railway | Following station |
|---|---|---|
| Sŏnghu towards Hyesan Ch'ŏngnyŏn | Paektusan Ch'ŏngnyŏn Line | Kilju Ch'ŏngnyŏn Terminus |
Location

Namsŏk station is a railway station on the Paektusan Ch'ŏngnyŏn Line of the Korean State Railway in Kilju, North Hamgyong Province, North Korea.

The station, along with the rest of the Kilju–Hapsu section, was opened by the Government Railways of Chosen(朝鮮総督府鉄道) on 1 November 1933.

On 9 October 2006 an underground nuclear test was conducted at P'unggye-ri in Kilju County, causing the closure of the line for 3–4 months.
