= Pochon Line =

Former railway line in North Korea

Poch'ŏn Line

Overview
- Other name(s): Paektusan Forest Railway 백두산림철선(白頭山林鐵線)
- Native name: 보천선(普天線)
- Status: Closed
- Owner: Korean State Railway
- Locale: Ryanggang
- Termini: Karim; Ryanggang Taep'yŏng
- Stations: 8

Service
- Type: Heavy rail

History
- Opened: 1940s
- Closed: 1994

Technical
- Line length: 31.5 km (19.6 mi)
- Number of tracks: Single track
- Track gauge: 762 mm (2 ft 6 in)
- Electrification: 1500 V DC Overhead line (Karim–Poch'ŏn)
Route map
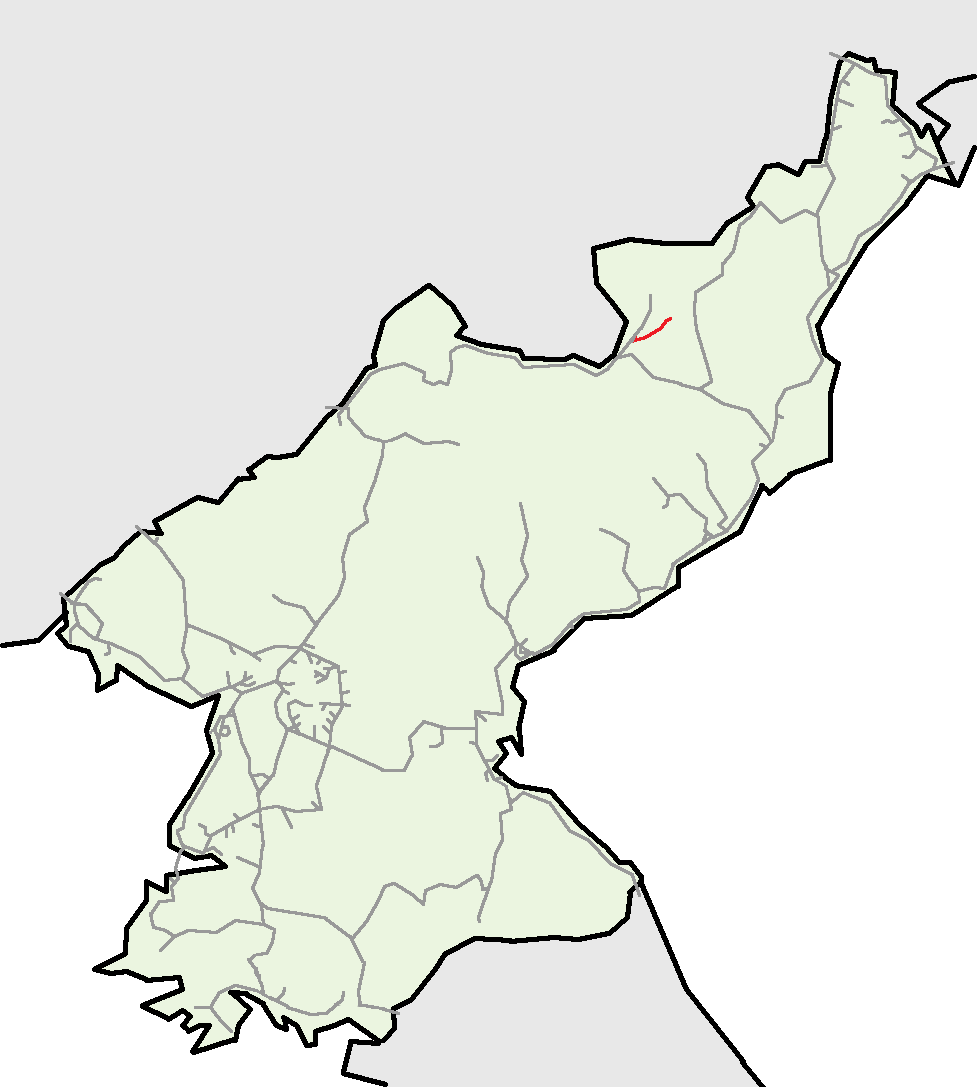

- Pochon Line
- Hangul: 보천선
- Hanja: 普天線
- RR: Bocheonseon
- MR: Poch'ŏnsŏn

The Poch'ŏn Line, also known as Paektusan Rimch'ŏl Line (Mount Paektu Forestry Line), is a former partially electrified narrow gauge line of the Korean State Railway in Ryanggang Province, North Korea, running from Karim on the Samjiyŏn Line to Ryanggang Taep'yŏng.

== History ==
Opened around the same time as the connecting Samjiyŏn Line, extensive flooding in 1994 led to the closure of the line.

In August 1980, Kim Il Sung ordered the construction of a new east–west transversal trunk line in the extreme north of the country. To accomplish this, railway engineers planned the new line, called the Pukpu Line, connecting Manp'o in the west with Hoeryŏng in the east to make use of parts of existing lines where possible to reduce the amount of new construction needed. Construction of this line was to take place in three stages. The first stage, completed in 1988, extended the former Unbong Line to Hyesan, resulting in the current Pukpu Line; the second stage was to have connected Hyesan to Musan on the Musan Line, and the third stage was to have connected Musan to Hoeryŏng on the Hambuk Line.

Construction of the second stage was to have made use of parts of existing lines in several places. From Hyesan to Wiyŏn it was to have shared the existing standard gauge trackage of the Paektusan Ch'ŏngnyŏn Line. The plan also included the conversion to standard gauge of four sections of existing narrow gauge lines: from Wiyŏn to Karim, the existing section of the Samjiyŏn line was to have been regauged; from Karim to Poch'ŏn the existing section of the Poch'ŏn Line was to have been regauged, from Rimyŏngsu to Motka, the remaining portion of the Samjiyŏn Line was to have been converted, and from Hŭngam to Musan the existing section of the narrow gauge Paengmu Line was to have been regauged. Then, new track was to be laid between Poch'ŏn and Rimyŏngsu and between Motka and Hŭngam to connect the regauged sections into a complete line. Although some initial work was started on the second stage, the DPRK's financial crisis of the 1990s led to the project being suspended.

== Route ==
A yellow background in the "Distance" box indicates that section of the line is not electrified; a pink background indicates that section is 2 ft 6 in (762 mm) narrow gauge; an orange background indicates that section is non-electrified narrow gauge.

Distance (km)		Station Name		Former Name		
Total	S2S	Transcribed	Chosŏn'gŭl (Hanja)	Transcribed	Chosŏn'gŭl (Hanja)	Connections
~~0.0~~	~~0.0~~	~~Karim~~	~~가림 (佳林)~~			Samjiyŏn Line
~~3.3~~	~~3.3~~	Poch'ŏn	보천 (普天)			Closed.
~~5.7~~	~~2.4~~	Konjangdŏk	곤장덕 (棍杖德)			Closed.
~~10.2~~	~~4.5~~	Naegok	내곡 (內曲)			Closed.
~~15.6~~	~~5.4~~	Onsu	온수 (溫水)			Closed.
~~20.9~~	~~5.3~~	Taejin	대진 (大鎭)			Closed.
~~24.8~~	~~3.9~~	Ryŏsu	려수 (麗水)			Closed.
~~31.5~~	~~6.7~~	Ryanggang Taep'yŏng	량강대평 (兩江大坪)	P'yŏngmul	평물 (-)	Closed.
