= Chaedok station =

Railway station in North Korea

Chaedŏk 재덕

Korean name
- Hangul: 재덕역
- Hanja: 載徳驛
- Revised Romanization: Chaedeok-yeok
- McCune–Reischauer: Chaedŏk-yŏk

General information
- Location: Kilju, North Hamgyŏng; North Korea
- Owner: Korean State Railway

History
- Opened: 1 November 1933; 92 years ago

Services
Preceding station	Korean State Railway	Following station
Sŏngdŏk towards Hyesan Ch'ŏngnyŏn	Paektusan Ch'ŏngnyŏn Line	P'unggye towards Kilju Ch'ŏngnyŏn
Location

Chaedŏk station is a railway station in Kilju county, North Hamgyŏng province, North Korea, on the Paektusan Ch'ŏngnyŏn Line of the Korean State Railway.

The station, along with the rest of the Kilju–Hapsu section, was opened by the Chōsen Government Railway on 1 November 1933.

On 9 October 2006 an underground nuclear test was conducted at P'unggye-ri in Kilju County, causing the closure of the line for 3–4 months.
