= Songhu station =

Railway station in North Korea

Sŏnghu 성후

Korean name
- Hangul: 성후역
- Hanja: 城後驛
- Revised Romanization: Seonghu-yeok
- McCune–Reischauer: Sŏnghu-yŏk

General information
- Location: Kilju, North Hamgyŏng; North Korea
- Coordinates: 41.0875°N 129.2086°E
- Owner: Korean State Railway

History
- Opened: 1 November 1933; 92 years ago

Services
Preceding station	Korean State Railway	Following station
P'unggye towards Hyesan Ch'ŏngnyŏn	Paektusan Ch'ŏngnyŏn Line	Namsŏk towards Kilju Ch'ŏngnyŏn
Location

Sŏnghu station is a railway station in Kilju county, North Hamgyŏng province, North Korea, on the Paektusan Ch'ŏngnyŏn Line of the Korean State Railway.

The station, along with the rest of the Kilju–Hapsu section, was opened by the Government Railways of Chosen(朝鮮総督府鉄道) on 1 November 1933.

On 9 October 2006 an underground nuclear test was conducted at P'unggye-ri in Kilju County, causing the closure of the line for 3–4 months.
