= Namgye station =

Railway station in North Korea

Namgye 남계

Korean name
- Hangul: 남계역
- Hanja: 南渓驛
- Revised Romanization: Namgye-yeok
- McCune–Reischauer: Namgye-yŏk

General information
- Location: Paegam, Ryanggang; North Korea
- Coordinates: 41.2200°N 128.8369°E
- Owner: Korean State Railway

History
- Opened: 1 August 1934; 92 years ago

Services
Preceding station	Korean State Railway	Following station
Paegam Ch'ŏngnyŏn towards Hyesan Ch'ŏngnyŏn	Paektusan Ch'ŏngnyŏn Line	Hapsu towards Kilju Ch'ŏngnyŏn
Location

Namgye station is a railway station in Paegam county, Ryanggang province, North Korea, on the Paektusan Ch'ŏngnyŏn Line of the Korean State Railway.

The station, along with the rest of the Hapsu-Paegam section, was opened by the Government Railways of Chosen(朝鮮総督府鉄道) on 1 August 1934.

On 9 October 2006 an underground nuclear test was conducted at P'unggye-ri in Kilju County, causing the closure of the line for 3–4 months.

Ore is the primary commodity shipped from this station.
