= Osichon station =

Railway station in North Korea

Osich'ŏn 오시천

Korean name
- Hangul: 오시천역
- Hanja: 五是川驛
- Revised Romanization: Osicheon-yeok
- McCune–Reischauer: Osich'ŏn-yŏk

General information
- Location: Taeosich'ŏl-lodongjagu, Unhŭng-gun, Ryanggang; North Korea
- Owner: Korean State Railway

History
- Opened: 1 November 1937
- Original company: Chosen Government Railway

Services
Preceding station	Korean State Railway	Following station
Taeoch'ŏn Terminus	Osich'ŏn Line	Terminus

Osich'ŏn station is a railway station in Taeosich'ŏl-lodongjagu, Unhŭng county, Ryanggang province, North Korea, at the end of the Osich'ŏn Line from Taeoch'ŏn on the Paektusan Ch'ŏngnyŏn Line of the Korean State Railway.

== History ==
The station, along with the rest of the Osich'ŏn Line, was opened by the Chosen Government Railway on 1 November 1937.

On 9 October 2006 an underground nuclear test was conducted at P'unggyeri in Kilju County, causing the closure of the line for 3–4 months.
