= Ryanggang Taepyong station =

Railway station in North Korea

Ryanggang Taep'yŏng 량강대평

Korean name
- Hangul: 량강대평역
- Hanja: 兩江大坪驛
- Revised Romanization: Yanggang Daepyeong-yeok
- McCune–Reischauer: Ryanggang Taep'yŏng-yŏk

General information
- Location: Taep'yŏng-rodongjagu, Poch'ŏn-gun, Ryanggang; North Korea
- Owner: Korean State Railway

Services
Preceding station	Korean State Railway	Following station
Ryŏsu towards Karim	Poch'ŏn Line	Terminus

Ryanggang Taep'yŏng station, originally P'yŏngmul station, is a former railway station in Taep'yŏng-rodongjagu, Poch'ŏn county, Ryanggang province, North Korea, the terminus of the narrow-gauge Poch'ŏn line.

== History ==
The station, along with the rest of the Poch'ŏn Line, was opened by the Korean State Railway sometime after 1948. Extensive flooding in 1994 led to the closure of both the Poch'ŏn and Samjiyŏn lines, and the station has since been out of use.
