= Osichon Line =

Railway line in North Korea

Osich'ŏn Line

Overview
- Native name: 오시천선 (五是川線)
- Status: Closed
- Owner: Chosen Government Railway (1937–1945); Korean State Railway (since 1945)
- Locale: Unhŭng-gun, Ryanggang
- Termini: Taeoch'ŏn; Osich'ŏn
- Stations: 2

Service
- Type: Heavy rail, Regional rail, Freight rail

History
- Opened: 1 November 1937

Technical
- Line length: 10 km (6.2 mi)
- Number of tracks: Single track
- Track gauge: 1,435 mm (4 ft 8 1/2 in) standard gauge

- Osichon Line
- Hangul: 오시천선
- Hanja: 五是川線
- RR: Osicheonseon
- MR: Osich'ŏnsŏn

The Osich'ŏn Line was a non-electrified railway line of the Korean State Railway in Unhŭng County, Ryanggang Province, North Korea, running from Taeoch'ŏn on the Paektusan Ch'ŏngnyŏn Line to Osich'ŏn.

The branch line to Kim Jong-un's private railway station, called "Hyesan No. 1 Station", diverges from the main line of the Paektusan Ch'ŏngnyŏn Line at almost the same point as the Osich'ŏn Line.

== History ==
This Osich'ŏn Line was opened by the Chosen Government Railway on 1 November 1937, at the same time as the Pongduri−Hyesanjin section of the Kilhye Line.

== Route ==
A yellow background in the "Distance" box indicates that section of the line is not electrified.

Distance (km)		Station Name		Former Name		
Total	S2S	Transcribed	Chosŏn'gŭl (Hanja)	Transcribed	Chosŏn'gŭl (Hanja)	Connections
0.0	0.0	Taeoch'ŏn	대오천 (大五川)			Paektusan Ch'ŏngnyŏn Line
~~10.0~~	~~10.0~~	Osich'ŏn	오시천 (五是川)			Closed. Distance estimated.
