= Pochon Chongnyon station =

Railway station in North Korea

Poch'ŏn Ch'ŏngnyŏn 보천청년

Korean name
- Hangul: 보천청년역
- Hanja: 普天靑年驛
- Revised Romanization: Garim-yeok
- McCune–Reischauer: Karim-yŏk

General information
- Location: Kasal-li, Poch'ŏn-gun, Ryanggang; North Korea
- Owner: Korean State Railway

History
- Opened: 1948

Services
Preceding station	Korean State Railway	Following station
Kansambong towards Motka	Samjiyŏn Line	Hwajŏn towards Wiyŏn
Terminus	Poch'ŏn Line	Poch'ŏn towards P'yŏngmul
Location

Poch'ŏn Ch'ŏngnyŏn station (former Karim station) is a railway station in Kasal-li, Poch'ŏn county, Ryanggang province, North Korea, on the Samjiyŏn of the Korean State Railway. It is also the starting point of the narrow-gauge Poch'ŏn line.

== History ==
The station, along with the rest of the Samjiyŏn Line, was opened by the Korean State Railway in 1948. Extensive flooding in 1994 led to the closure of the line, and the station has since been out of use.
