= Paegam Chongnyon station =

Railway station in North Korea

Paegam Ch'ŏngnyŏn 백암청년

Korean name
- Hangul: 백암청년역
- Hanja: 白岩青年驛
- Revised Romanization: Baegamcheongnyeon-yeok
- McCune–Reischauer: Paegamch'ŏngnyŏn-yŏk

General information
- Location: Paegam-ŭp, Paegam, Ryanggang; North Korea
- Coordinates: 41.2438°N 128.8009°E
- Owner: Korean State Railway

History
- Opened: 1 August 1934; 92 years ago

Services
| Preceding station | Korean State Railway | Following station |
|---|---|---|
| Ryŏngha towards Hyesan Ch'ŏngnyŏn | Paektusan Ch'ŏngnyŏn Line | Namgye towards Kilju Ch'ŏngnyŏn |
| Taet'aek towards Musan | Paengmu Line | Terminus |
Location

Paegam Ch'ŏngnyŏn station is a railway station in Paegam-ŭp, Paegam county, Ryanggang province, North Korea, on the Paektusan Ch'ŏngnyŏn Line of the Korean State Railway. The narrow-gauge Paengmu Line connects to the standard-gauge network here.

== History ==
Originally called Paegam station (Chosŏn'gŭl: 백암역; Hanja: 白岩駅), the station, along with the rest of the Hapsu–Paegam section, was opened by the Government Railways of Chosen (朝鮮総督府鉄道) on 1 August 1934. It received its current name in 1960.

On 9 October 2006 an underground nuclear test was conducted at P'unggye-ri in Kilju County, causing the closure of the line for 3–4 months.

== Services ==
Paegam station is an important hub for freight traffic in Ryanggang province. Raw logs are shipped here from locations on the Paengmu line, and forwarded by rail to a large sawmill at Wiyŏn, as well as to a pulp mill and plywood factory in Kilju.

Express passenger trains 1/2, operating between P'yŏngyang and Hyesan Ch'ŏngnyŏn, stop at Paegam station.
