= Pochon County =

Poch'ŏn County 보천군
- County

Korean transcription(s)
  - Chosŏn'gŭl: 보천군
  - Hancha: 普天郡
  - McCune–Reischauer: Poch'ŏn-gun
  - Revised Romanization: Bocheon-gun
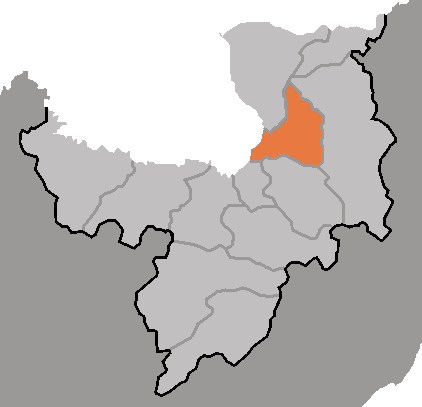
- Map of Ryanggang showing the location of Pochon
- Country: North Korea
- Province: Ryanggang
- Administrative divisions: 1 ŭp, 2 workers' districts, 17 ri

Area
  - Total: 783 km^{2} (302 sq mi)

Population (2008)
  - Total: 37,225
  - Density: 47.5/km^{2} (123/sq mi)

Poch'ŏn County is a kun, or county, in Ryanggang Province, North Korea. It looks westward across the Amrok River at China.

== Geography ==
The Masingryong Mountains pass through the county, which slopes downward gradually to the west. The county sits atop the Paektu Plateau, with the mountains rising to only a small relative height. The highest peak is Namp'ot'aesan (남포태산). There are numerous streams, of which the chief is the Karimch'ŏn. Some 83% of the county's area is taken up by forestland. The temperatures are quite cold.

== Economy ==
The predominant local industry is logging. There are also deposits of magnetite, alunite, and obsidian. Poch'ŏn's farms produce potatoes, wheat and barley, among other crops; orchards and livestock farms are also found.

== Transportation ==
Poch'ŏn is served by the Samjiyŏn and Poch'ŏn (Paektusan Rimch'ŏl) lines of the Korean State Railway, and also by roads.

== Administrative divisions ==
Pochon-gun is divided into 1 up (town), 2 rodongjagu (workers' districts) and 17 ri (villages):

	Chosŏn'gŭl	Hancha
Poch'ŏn-ŭp	보천읍	普天邑
Taejil-lodongjagu	대진로동자구	大鎭勞動者區
Taep'yŏng-rodongjagu	대평로동자구	大坪勞動者區
Ch'ŏngrim-ri	청림리	靑林里
Hosal-li	호산리	虎山里
Hŭngsŏng-ri	흥성리	興成里
Hwajŏl-li	화전리	樺田里
Kasal-li	가산리	佳山里
Mun'am-ri	문암리	門岩里
Naegong-ri	내곡리	內曲里
Paekcha-ri	백자리	柏子里
Pohŭng-ri	보흥리	保興里
Ryongdŏng-ri	룡덕리	龍德里
Sangryong-ri	상룡리	上龍里
Sinhŭng-ri	신흥리	新興里
Songbong-ri	송봉리	松峰里
Taehŭng-ri	대흥리	大興里
Taesil-li	대신리	大新里
Ŭihwa-ri	의화리	儀化里
Unnam-ri	운남리	雲南里

== See also ==
- Geography of North Korea
- Administrative divisions of North Korea
- Ryanggang
- Battle of Pochonbo
- Pochonbo Electronic Ensemble
