= Samjiyon Line =

Railway line in North Korea

Samjiyŏn Line

Overview
- Native name: 삼지연선 (三池淵線)
- Status: Operational
- Owner: Korean State Railway
- Locale: Ryanggang
- Termini: Wiyŏn Ch'ŏngnyŏn; Motka
- Stations: 12

Service
- Type: Heavy rail
- Operator: Korean State Railway

History
- Opened: 1948
- Closed: 1994
- Reopened: 5 April 2017

Technical
- Line length: 77.2 km (48.0 mi) (old line); 64.0 km (39.8 mi) (new line)
- Number of tracks: Single track
- Track gauge: 1,435 mm (4 ft 8 1/2 in) standard gauge
- Old gauge: 762 mm (2 ft 6 in)
- Electrification: 1500 V DC Overhead line (old line)
Route map
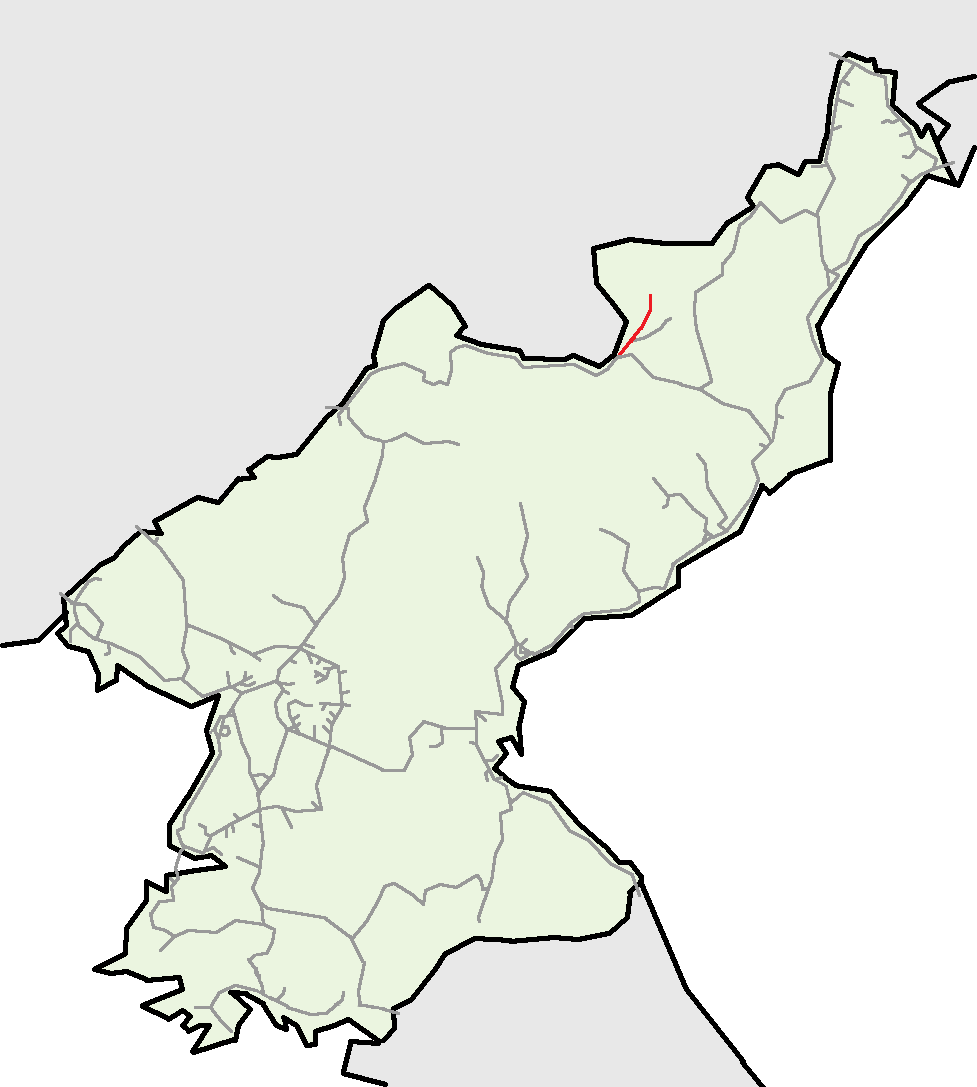

- Samjiyon Line
- Hangul: 삼지연선
- Hanja: 三池淵線
- Lit.: Samji Lake line
- RR: Samjiyeonseon
- MR: Samjiyŏnsŏn

Samjiyŏn Line is the name of a railway line of the Korean State Railway in Ryanggang Province, North Korea, running from Wiyŏn on the Paektusan Ch'ŏngnyŏn Line to Motka. The name is applied both to the original narrow gauge line built in 1948, as well as to the new standard gauge line opened in 2017.

While the original line was 77.2 km (48.0 mi), the new standard gauge line is considerably shorter at 64 km (40 mi).

== History ==
To replace the Hyesan to Rimyŏngsu road, which had been built by the Japanese colonial authorities and which by the time of the Liberation of Korea had fallen into a poor state of repair, the Korean State Railway built the 81.8 km (50.8 mi) Samjiyŏn Line in 1948. Extensive flooding in 1994 led to the closure of the line.

=== Conversion to standard gauge ===
In August 1980, Kim Il Sung ordered the construction of a new east–west transversal trunk line in the extreme north of the country. To accomplish this, railway engineers planned the new line, called the Pukbunaeryuk Line, connecting Manp'o in the west with Hoeryŏng in the east to make use of parts of existing lines where possible to reduce the amount of new construction needed. Construction of this line was to take place in three stages. The first stage, completed in 1988, extended the former Unbong Line to Hyesan, resulting in the current Pukpu Line; the second stage was to have connected Hyesan to Musan on the Musan Line, and the third stage was to have connected Musan to Hoeryŏng on the Hambuk Line.

Construction of the second stage was to have made use of parts of existing lines in several places. From Hyesan to Wiyŏn it was to have shared the existing standard gauge trackage of the Paektusan Ch'ŏngnyŏn Line. The plan also included the conversion to standard gauge of four sections of existing narrow gauge lines: from Wiyŏn to Karim, the existing section of the Samjiyŏn line was to have been regauged; from Karim to Poch'ŏn the existing section of the Poch'ŏn Line was to have been regauged, from Rimyŏngsu to Motka, the remaining portion of the Samjiyŏn Line was to have been converted, and from Hŭngam to Musan the existing section of the narrow gauge Paengmu Line was to have been regauged. Then, new track was to be laid between Poch'ŏn and Rimyŏngsu and between Motka and Hŭngam to connect the regauged sections into a complete line. Although some initial work was started on the second stage, the DPRK's financial crisis of the 1990s led to the project being suspended until 2007.

In 2005, much of the existing infrastructure on the closed narrow gauge line was demolished to make way for new construction, and in early 2007 work began on the new standard gauge line, but due to financial difficulties stopped after only four months; work resumed in November 2008. A ceremony was held on 15 November 2009, but due to a shortage of materials construction was again suspended in August of the same year.

Work resumed once again on 25 May 2015, and another groundbreaking ceremony was held on 4 June of that year. Heavy rains in July of that year caused difficulties, and work was suspended once again in early 2016; it was resumed again later that year with second-hand rail from China; this rail was cut down to 13 m (43 ft). In comparison, domestic rail from the Hwanghae Iron & Steel Complex is supplied in 9 m (30 ft) sections made up of three 3 m (9.8 ft) sections joined by welding.

Finally, on 5 April 2017 the first runs were made along the line using two diesel locomotives.

Per the original Pukbunaeryuk Line construction plans, construction is to continue from Motka to Musan, but this is not currently being pursued.

== Services ==
Prior to its closure, many passenger and freight trains ran on the Samjiyŏn Line; in addition to being the main means of transport for local inhabitants, many travellers from around the country used the line to visit the Samjiyŏn Revolutionary Site.

== Route ==
A yellow background in the "Distance" box indicates that section of the line is not electrified; a pink background indicates that section is 2 ft 6 in (762 mm) narrow gauge; an orange background indicates that section is non-electrified narrow gauge.

=== Former narrow gauge line ===
Distance (km)		Station Name		Former Name		
Total	S2S	Transcribed	Chosŏn'gŭl (Hanja)	Transcribed	Chosŏn'gŭl (Hanja)	Connections
~~0.0~~	~~0.0~~	Wiyŏn	위연 (渭淵)			Paektusan Ch'ŏngnyŏn Line
~~1.3~~	~~1.3~~	Hwajŏn	화전 (樺田)			
~~6.3~~	~~5.0~~	Karim	가림 (佳林)			Paektusan Rimch'ŏl Line
~~13.5~~	~~7.2~~	Kansambong	간삼봉 (間三峰)			
~~20.2~~	~~6.7~~	Nongsan	농산 (農山)			
~~25.7~~	~~5.5~~	Ch'agasu	차가수 (車哥水)			
~~31.5~~	~~5.8~~	Toksan	독산 (獨山)			
~~48.6~~	~~17.1~~	Samp'o	삼포 (三浦)			
~~56.0~~	~~7.4~~	Yangsu	양수 (陽水)			
~~58.9~~	~~2.9~~	Rimyŏngsu	리명수 (鯉明水)			
~~61.2~~	~~3.7~~	Kŏnch'ang	건창 (乾昌)			Station on switchback.
~~69.3~~	~~8.1~~	Pegaebong	베개봉 (-)			
~~72.2~~	~~3.9~~	Samjiyŏn	삼지연 (三池淵)			
~~77.2~~	~~5.0~~	Motka	못가 (-)			

=== New standard gauge line ===
Distance (km)		Station Name		Former Name		
Total	S2S	Transcribed	Chosŏn'gŭl (Hanja)	Transcribed	Chosŏn'gŭl (Hanja)	Connections
0.0	0.0	Wiyŏn Ch'ŏngnyŏn	위연청년 (渭淵靑年)			Paektusan Ch'ŏngnyŏn Line
		Hwajŏn	화전 (樺田)			
6.2		Poch'ŏn Ch'ŏngnyŏn	보천청년 (普天靑年)			
14.4	8.2	P'ot'ae	포태 (胞胎)			
		Rimyŏngsu Ch'ŏngnyŏn	리명수청년 (鯉明水靑年)			
59.4		Samjiyŏn Ch'ŏngnyŏn	삼지연청년 (三池淵靑年)			
64.0	4.6	Samjiyŏn Motka	삼지연못가 (三池淵못가)			
