= Hyesan mine =

Silver mine in North Korea

- Location: Ryanggang Province, North Korea
- Products: Silver, gold, copper, lead, zinc

The Hyesan mine (Korean: 혜산청년광산) is one of the largest silver mines in North Korea and in the world. The mine is located in the north of the country in Ryanggang Province. The mine has estimated reserves of 3.07 million oz of gold and 921.6 million oz of silver. The mine also has reserves amounting to 160 million tonnes of ore grading 0.35% copper, 3.2% lead and 3.6% zinc .
