= Samjiyon Motka station =

Railway station in North Korea

Coordinates: 41°49′43″N 128°21′04″E

Motka 못가

Korean name
- Hangul: 못가역
- Hanja: 못가驛
- Revised Romanization: Motga-yeok
- McCune–Reischauer: Motka-yŏk

General information
- Location: Chunghŭng-rodongjagu, Samjiyŏn-si, Ryanggang; North Korea
- Owner: Korean State Railway

History
- Opened: 1948
- Closed: 1994

Services
Preceding station	Korean State Railway	Following station
Terminus	Samjiyŏn Line	Samjiyŏn towards Wiyŏn
Location

Motka station is a railway station in Chunghŭng-rodongjagu, Samjiyon City, Ryanggang province, North Korea, on the Samjiyŏn Line of the Korean State Railway.

== History ==
The station, along with the rest of the Samjiyŏn Line, was opened by the Korean State Railway in 1948. Extensive flooding in 1994 led to the closure of the line, and the station has since been out of use. It is to be the terminus of the standard gauge replacement for the closed narrow gauge line.
