= Paengmu Line =

Railway line in North Korea

Overview
- Native name: 백무선(白茂線)
- Status: Operational
- Owner: Chosen Government Railway (1934–1945); Korean State Railway (since 1945)
- Locale: Ryanggang, North Hamgyŏng
- Termini: Paeg'am Ch'ŏngnyŏn; Musan
- Stations: 28

Service
- Type: Heavy rail, Regional rail

History
- Opened: Stages between 1934–1944

Technical
- Line length: 191.7 km (119.1 mi)
- Number of tracks: Single track
- Track gauge: 1,435 mm (4 ft 8 1/2 in) (Paegam–Taet'aek); 762 mm (2 ft 6 in)
- Electrification: 1500 V DC Catenary (Taet'aek–Kulsong, formerly to Yugok)
Route map
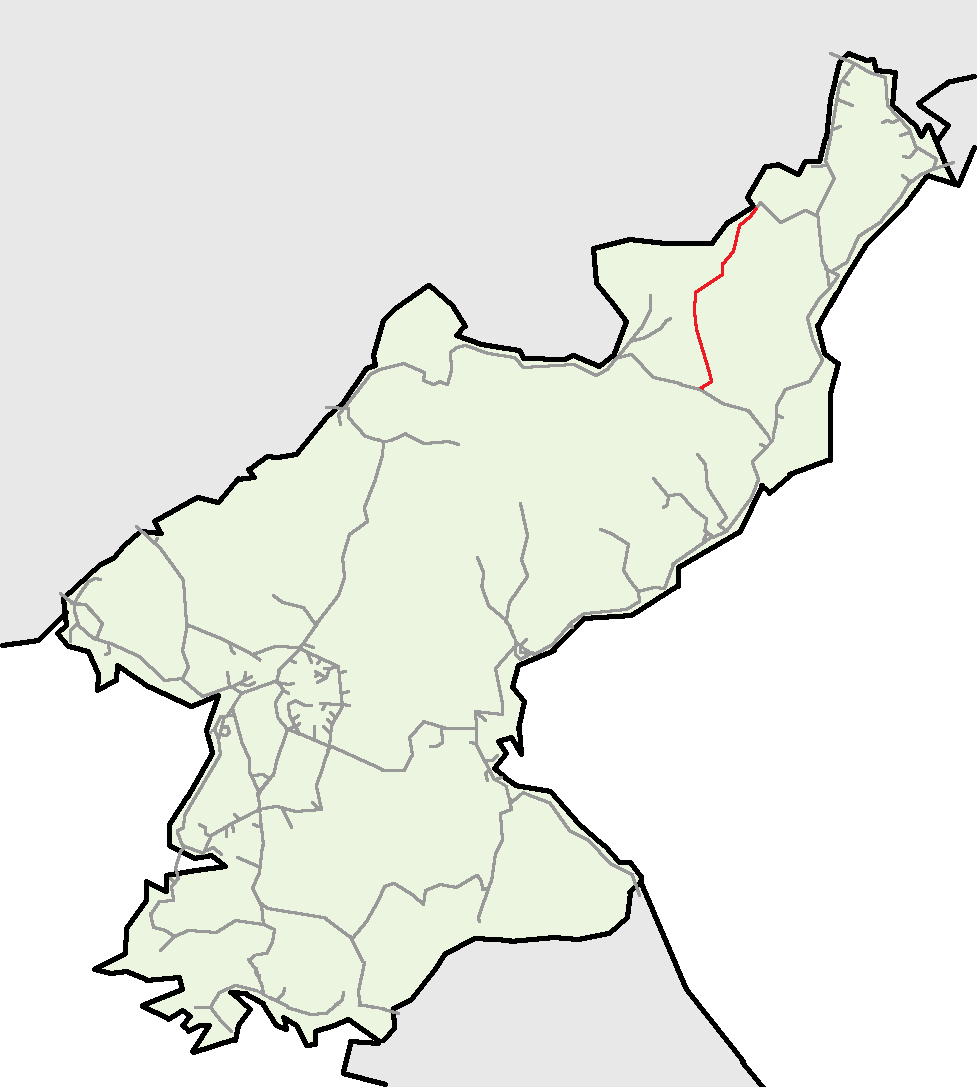

- Paengmu Line
- Hangul: 백무선
- Hanja: 白茂線
- RR: Baengmuseon
- MR: Paengmusŏn

The Paengmu Line is a partially electrified narrow gauge line of the Korean State Railway running from Paeg'am on the Paektusan Ch'ŏngnyŏn Line to Musan on the Musan Line, in the Ryanggang and North Hamgyŏng provinces of North Korea.

The electrified section originally ran 111 km (69 mi) from Paeg'am Ch'ŏngnyŏn station to Yugok, whence the remaining 80.7 km (50.1 mi) to the terminus at Musan remained unelectrified. Since the closure of part of the line due to the construction of a reservoir, the line has been split into two disconnected sections, the electrified Paeg'am—Kulsong and the non-electrified Ch'ŏnsu—Musan sections. A new standard gauge section from Paeg'am to Taet'aek, roughly paralleling the narrow-gauge line, was built in 2013.

== History ==
In 1927, the Government-General of Korea formulated a "12-Year Plan for Railways in Chosen", under which the railway network of the Korean Peninsula was to be greatly expanded. Although not part of that 12-year plan, it was decided to build the Paengmu Line for the transport of forest products and to aid in the development of the area. Construction was started at Paeg'am' by the Chosen Government Railway on 16 November 1932, and the first section, from Paeg'am to San'yangdae, was opened in September 1934. The line was extended to Yŏn'am in September of the following year and to Yup'yŏngdong in October 1936. Service on the Yup'yŏngdong—Yŏnsa section began in October 1939, but the final section to Musan, connecting the line to the Musan Line, was completed only in December 1944.

The names of several stations were changed over the years following the establishment of the DPRK, with Paeg'am Station becoming Paeg'am Ch'ŏngnyŏn Station, Hambuk Sinjang Station becoming Sinjang Station (this station was subsequently closed), Hambuk Mun'am Station becoming Tuam Station, and Sinyang Station becoming Samyu Station. Electrification of the section from Paeg'am to Yugok was completed in August 1991.

In August 1980, Kim Il Sung ordered the construction of a new, northern east–west transversal line to run from Manp'o on the Manp'o Line to Hoeryŏng on the Hambuk Line. The Pukpu Line, as the planned line was called (북부, pukpu, means "northern"), was to have been built in three stages: Manp'o to Hyesan, Hyesan to Musan, and Musan to Hoeryŏng; to save on labour and expenditures, the new line was to make use of existing rail lines where possible – the Hŭngam–Musan section of the Paengmu Line was to have been regauged. However, this plan was only partially realised before it was abandoned in the 1990s. The plans were revived again in the mid-2000s, and work began on the second stage, in the form of the shortening and regauging of the Samjiyŏn Line from Hyesan to Motka. Work stopped and started several times, until finally work on the Hyesan–Motka section was completed in April 2017, but the plans to continue construction of the line to Musan are not currently being pursued.

Construction of the reservoir of the Paektusan Sŏngun Youth Power Station led to the flooding of part of the line, resulting in the closure of the section between Ch'ŏnsu and Kulsong; since the closure, the line is electrified only between Paeg'am and Kulsong.

Construction of the line took place as follows:

Date	Section	Length
1 September 1934	Paeg'am–Sanyangdae	33.8 km (21.0 mi)
1 September 1935	Sanyangdae–Yŏn'am	22.1 km (13.7 mi)
16 October 1936	Yŏn'am-Yup'yŏngdong	44.6 km (27.7 mi)
1 October 1939	Yup'yŏngdong–Yŏnsa	36.3 km (22.6 mi)
1 December 1944	Yŏnsa–Musan	54.9 km (34.1 mi)

== Route ==
An orange background in the "Distance" box indicates that section of the line is not electrified narrow-gauge; a pink background indicates that section is electrified narrow gauge. The Paegam—Taet'aek section is duplicated by an incomplete electrified standard gauge.

Distance (km)		Station Name		Former Name		
Total	S2S	Transcribed	Chosŏn'gŭl (Hanja)	Transcribed	Chosŏn'gŭl (Hanja)	Notes
0.0	0.0	Paeg'am Ch'ŏngnyŏn	백암청년 (白岩靑年)	Paeg'am	백암 (白岩)	Paektusan Ch'ŏngnyŏn Line
6.6	6.6	Taet'aek	대택 (大澤)			Parallel incomplete standard gauge line ends
11.9	5.3	Pukkyesu	북계수 (北溪水)			
17.6	5.7	Sangdonae (Upper Tonae)	상도내 (上島內)			
24.2	6.6	Tonae	도내 (島內)			
29.2	5.0	Sanghwangt'o	상황토 (上黃土)			
33.8	4.6	Sanyangdae	산양대 (山羊台)			
40.5	6.7	Sŏdu	서두 (西頭)			
47.1	6.6	Yŏnp'yŏng	연평 (延坪)			
55.9	8.8	Yŏn'am	연암 (延岩)			
58.4	2.5	Kulsong	굴송 (屈松)			
~~63.5~~	~~5.1~~	Sangdan	상단 (上壇)	Sangdam	상담 (上坍)	Closed. Flooded by reservoir of Paektusan Sŏngun Youth Power Station
~~68.6~~	~~5.1~~	Samsa	삼사 (三社)			Closed. Flooded by reservoir of Paektusan Sŏngun Youth Power Station
77.4	8.8	Ch'ŏnsu	천수 (天水)			No longer electrified.
86.0	8.6	Hahwangt'o	하황토 (下黃土)			No longer electrified.
90.1	4.1	Sanggyŏngp'yŏng (Upper Kyŏngp'yŏng)	상경평 (上境坪)			No longer electrified.
~~96.1~~	~~6.0~~	Hagyŏngp'yŏng (Lower Kyŏngp'yŏng)	하경평 (下境坪)			Closed. No longer electrified.
~~100.5~~	~~4.4~~	Yup'yŏngdong	유평동 (楡坪洞)			Closed. No longer electrified.
111.0	10.5	Yugok	유곡 (楡谷)			No longer electrified.
117.4	6.4	Rajŏk	라적 (羅跡)			
126.9	9.5	Samyu	삼유 (三楡)	Sinyang	신양 (新陽)	
129.5	2.6	Sodo	소도 (小桃)			
136.8	9.1	Yŏnsa	연사 (延社)			
143.4	6.6	Hambuk Sinjang	함북신장 (咸北新章)			Closed.
150.1	6.7	Yŏnsu	연수 (延水)			
158.4	8.3	Tuam	두암 (頭岩)	Hambuk Mun'am	함북문암 (咸北文岩)	
164.8	6.4	Yŏnsang	연상 (延上)			
174.1	9.3	Hŭngam	흥암 (興巖)			
181.2	7.1	Namch'on	남촌 (南村)			
186.0	4.8	Tokso	독소 (篤所)			Flag stop.
191.7	5.7	Musan	무산 (茂山)			Musan Line
