= Paegam County =

Coordinates: 41.569°N 128.807°E

Paegam County 백암군
- County

Korean transcription(s)
  - Chosŏn'gŭl: 백암군
  - Hancha: 白岩郡
  - McCune-Reischauer: Paegam-gun
  - Revised Romanization: Baegam-gun
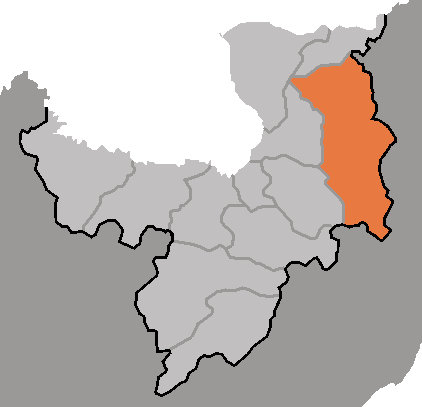
- Map of Ryanggang showing the location of Paegam
- Country: North Korea
- Province: Ryanggang
- Administrative divisions: 1 ŭp, 19 workers' districts, 4 ri

Area
  - Total: 2,313 km^{2} (893 sq mi)

Population (2008)
  - Total: 67,683
  - Density: 29.26/km^{2} (75.79/sq mi)

Paegam County is a kun, or county, in Ryanggang province, North Korea.

== Geography ==
The terrain is mountainous, as Paegam lies atop the Paektu Plateau, the site of North Korea's tallest mountains. The Hamgyŏng and Machŏllyŏng ranges pass through the county; the highest point is Kwesangbong. There are many streams; the chief of these is the Sodusu (서두수). There are also wetlands; some 91% of the county's area is forestland.

== Administrative divisions ==
Paegam county is divided into 1 ŭp (town), 19 rodongjagu (workers' districts) and 4 ri (villages):

- Paegam-ŭp (백암읍/白岩邑)
- Chŭngsal-lodongjagu (증산로동자구/甑山勞動者區)
- Ch'ŏngbong-rodongjagu (청봉로동자구/靑峰勞動者區)
- Ch'ŏnsu-rodongjagu (천수로동자구/天水勞動者區)
- Kwangdŏng-rodongjagu (광덕로동자구/廣德勞動者區)
- Okch'ŏl-lodongjagu (옥천로동자구/玉川勞動者區)
- Paegam-rodongjagu (백암로동자구/白岩勞動者區)
- Pakch'ŏl-lodongjagu (박천로동자구/博川勞動者區)
- Puhŭng-rodongjagu (부흥로동자구/復興勞動者區)
- Samsup'yŏng-rodonjagu (삼수평로동자구/三水坪勞動者區)
- Sanyang-rodongjagu (산양로동자구/山羊勞動者區)
- Sebong-rodongjagu (세봉로동자구/세봉勞動者區)
- Taet'aeng-rodongjagu (대택로동자구/大澤勞動者區)
- Tonggye-rodongjagu (동계로동자구/東溪勞動者區)
- Tŏngrim-rodongjagu (덕립로동자구/德立勞動者區)
- Ŭndŏng-rodongjagu (은덕로동자구/恩德勞動者區)
- Wŏnbong-rodongjagu (원봉로동자구/円峰勞動者區)
- Yanghŭng-rodongjagu (양흥로동자구/陽興勞動者區)
- Yŏlwŏlsib'o-rodongjagu (October 15 Workers' District) (10월15일로동자구/10月15日勞動者區)
- Yup'yŏng-rodongjagu (유평로동자구/楡坪勞動者區)
- Hwangt'o-ri (황토리/黃土里)
- Sangdam-ri (상담리/上潭里)
- Sŏdu-ri (서두리/西頭里)
- Yanggong-ri (양곡리/陽谷里)

== Climate ==
Due to its inland location, the county has a severely cold continental climate. Paegam also has the highest wind speeds of any district in North Korea.

== Economy ==
Mining and logging are important local industries. Mineral resources in the county include magnesite, alunite, kaolinite, copper, dolomite, tungsten, lead, zinc, gold and peat. Agriculture also plays a role, although only 4% of the county's land is cultivated. Local crops include wheat, barley, potatoes and soybeans. Livestock are also raised.

== Transportation ==
Paegam is connected to the national road and rail grids; the Paektusan Ch'ŏngnyŏn and Paengmu lines of the Korean State Railway pass through the county.

== See also ==
- Geography of North Korea
- Administrative divisions of North Korea
- Ryanggang
