= Unhung station =

Railway station in North Korea

Unhŭng 운흥

Korean name
- Hangul: 운흥역
- Hanja: 雲興驛
- Revised Romanization: Unheung-yeok
- McCune–Reischauer: Unhŭng-yŏk

General information
- Location: Unhŭng-ŭp, Unhŭng, Ryanggang; North Korea
- Coordinates: 41.3056°N 128.4977°E
- Owner: Korean State Railway

History
- Opened: 1 September 1935; 90 years ago

Services
Preceding station	Korean State Railway	Following station
Poan towards Hyesan Ch'ŏngnyŏn	Paektusan Ch'ŏngnyŏn Line	Saengjang towards Kilju Ch'ŏngnyŏn
Location

Unhŭng station is a railway station in Unhŭng-ŭp, Unhŭng county, Ryanggang province, North Korea, on the Paektusan Ch'ŏngnyŏn Line of the Korean State Railway.

Originally called Pongdu-ri station (Chosŏn'gŭl: 봉두리역; Hanja: 鳳頭里駅), the station, along with the rest of the Paegam–Pongdu-ri section, was opened by the Government Railways of Chosen (朝鮮総督府鉄道) on 1 September 1935. It received its current name after the establishment of the DPRK.

On 9 October 2006 an underground nuclear test was conducted at P'unggye-ri in Kilju County, causing the closure of the line for 3–4 months.

Iron sulphide is the main commodity shipped from Unhŭng.
