= Hyesan =

Municipal City in Ryanggang, North Korea

Hyesan 혜산시
- Municipal city

Korean transcription(s)
  - Chosŏn'gŭl: 혜산시
  - Hancha: 惠山市
  - McCune-Reischauer: Hyesan-si
  - Revised Romanization: Hyesan-si
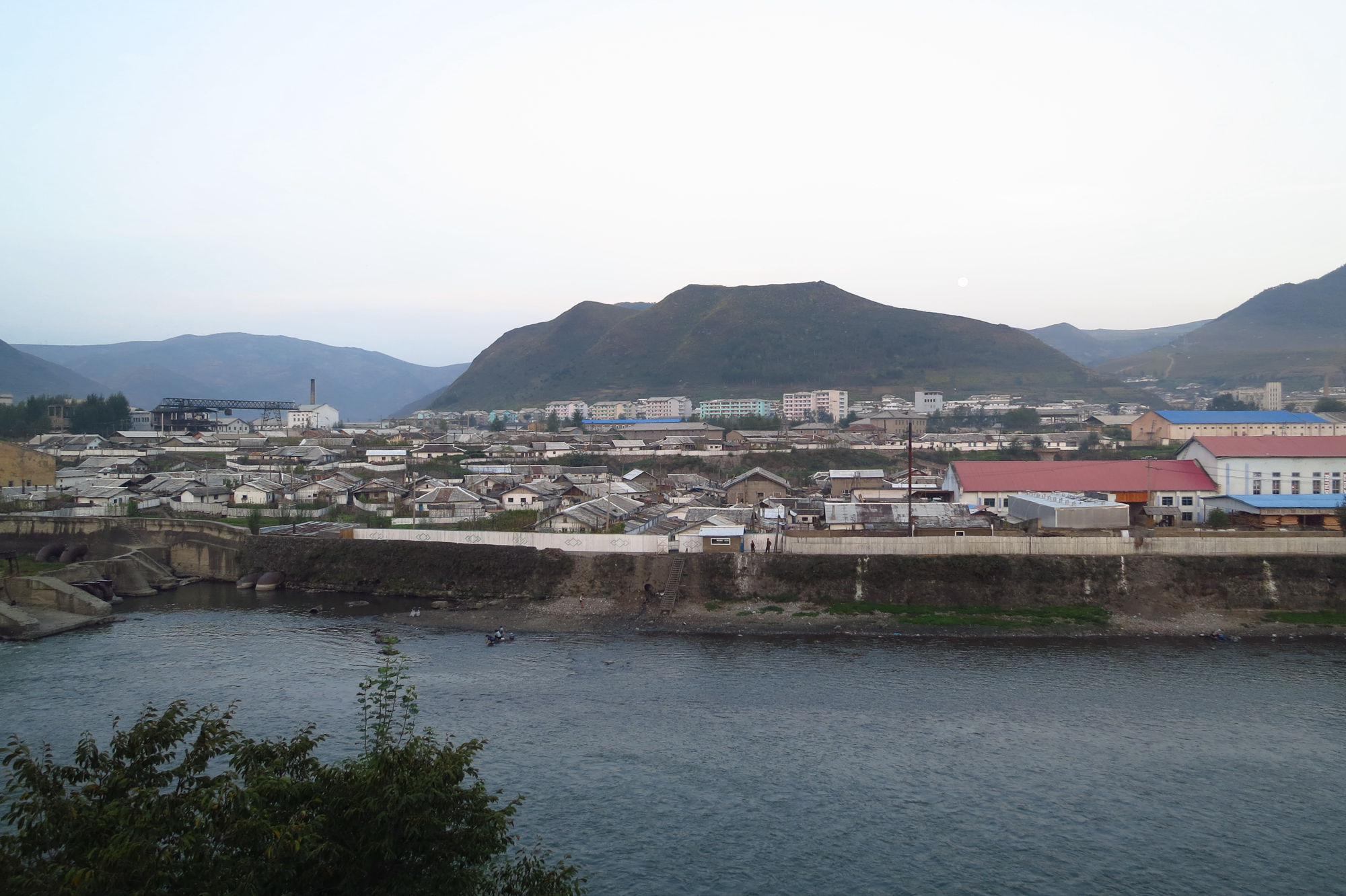
- Downtown Hyesan in September 2013

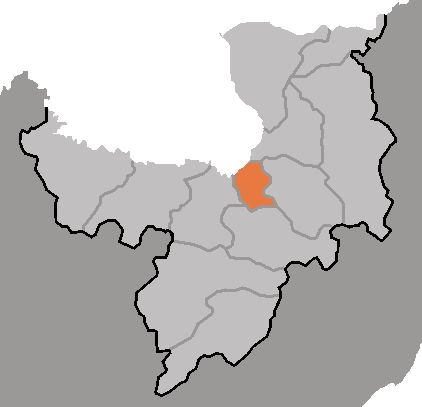
- Map of Ryanggang showing the location of Hyesan
- Interactive map of Hyesan
- Location within North Korea
- Coordinates: 41°24′N 128°11′E
- Country: North Korea
- Province: Ryanggang
- Administrative divisions: 25 tong, 4 ri

Area
  - Total: 277 km^{2} (107 sq mi)

Population (2008)
  - Total: 192,680
  - Density: 696/km^{2} (1,800/sq mi)
  - Dialect: Hamgyŏng
  - Demonym: Hyesanite
- Time zone: UTC+9 (Pyongyang Time)

Hyesan (Korean pronunciation: [he̞(ː)sʰa̠n]) is a city in the northern part of Ryanggang province of North Korea. It is a hub of river transportation as well as a product distribution centre. It is also the administrative centre of Ryanggang Province. As of 2008, the population of the city is 192,680.

== Area ==
Around the 1940s, this city included the nearby Paektu Mountains. However, due to several changes, the area of this city was reduced, and now it only includes the nearby Yalu River.

Due to the division between the two Koreas, Hyesan is also claimed by South Korea, following the boundaries of 1940s, not the one used by North Korea. Therefore, according to South Korea, Hyesan still includes the nearby Paektu Mountains.

South Korea has a conflict with the People's Republic of China because of the Paektu Mountains. The mountain is actually divided in two: the south parts are ruled by North Korea while the north parts are ruled by the PRC. However, South Korea still claims the northern parts. It is not officially claimed, but on maps printed by South Korea, it is de facto claimed. The People's Republic of China claims the entire mountain.

== History ==
Originally a village in Goguryeo, and Balhae, it was lost to the Jurchen (Manchu) tribes after the fall of Balhae in 982. Recaptured in the 3rd year of King Gongmin (1391) of Goryeo from the Jurchens during the anarchy following the fall of Yuan dynasty, its permanent garrison was established by King Sejong of Joseon in 1430s. The Joseon military fortress and settlement named Hyesanjin (혜산진; 惠山鎭) and is the forerunner of the modern city and its name.

During the Korean war, Hyesan was the northernmost limit of US Army's advance, when the 15th Infantry Regiment of the 7th Infantry Division reached the Yalu River at Hyesan on November 21, 1950 before the Chinese intervention.

The city was a main border trafficking town between North Korea and China throughout late 20th century and early 21st century. Kim Jong Un conducted its first full lockdown in November 2020 during the Covid-19 crisis, and has since increased the border security to prevent illegal cross-border traffic between North Korea and China.

== Geography ==
The city is located south of the Paektu Mountains at the border with the People's Republic of China (Jilin province), from which it is separated by the Yalu (Amrok) River. Changbai is the closest Chinese city across the river.

=== Climate ===
Hyesan has an elevation-influenced humid continental climate (Köppen climate classification Dwb). It is located in the coldest area of Korea, which holds a record low temperature of −42 °C or −43.6 °F in 1915.

Climate data for Hyesan (1991-2020 normals, extremes 1957-present)
Month	Jan	Feb	Mar	Apr	May	Jun	Jul	Aug	Sep	Oct	Nov	Dec	Year
Record high °C (°F)	6.1 (43.0)	12.1 (53.8)	21.0 (69.8)	30.0 (86.0)	35.0 (95.0)	34.0 (93.2)	37.1 (98.8)	38.3 (100.9)	31.6 (88.9)	29.5 (85.1)	19.0 (66.2)	8.2 (46.8)	38.3 (100.9)
Mean daily maximum °C (°F)	−8 (18)	−2.8 (27.0)	4.5 (40.1)	13.6 (56.5)	20.8 (69.4)	25.1 (77.2)	27.7 (81.9)	27.0 (80.6)	21.9 (71.4)	14.2 (57.6)	2.9 (37.2)	−6.3 (20.7)	11.7 (53.1)
Daily mean °C (°F)	−15.9 (3.4)	−11.2 (11.8)	−2.7 (27.1)	6.0 (42.8)	12.8 (55.0)	17.5 (63.5)	21.1 (70.0)	20.3 (68.5)	13.8 (56.8)	5.8 (42.4)	−4 (25)	−13.2 (8.2)	4.2 (39.6)
Mean daily minimum °C (°F)	−22.2 (−8.0)	−18.5 (−1.3)	−9.5 (14.9)	−1.1 (30.0)	5.7 (42.3)	11.4 (52.5)	16.0 (60.8)	15.4 (59.7)	7.6 (45.7)	−0.7 (30.7)	−9.6 (14.7)	−19.1 (−2.4)	−2.1 (28.2)
Record low °C (°F)	−37.2 (−35.0)	−33.0 (−27.4)	−27.8 (−18.0)	−20.0 (−4.0)	−4.3 (24.3)	−1.7 (28.9)	6.5 (43.7)	1.0 (33.8)	−4.3 (24.3)	−19.9 (−3.8)	−26.6 (−15.9)	−35.0 (−31.0)	−37.2 (−35.0)
Average precipitation mm (inches)	5.0 (0.20)	9.1 (0.36)	11.6 (0.46)	30.0 (1.18)	62.4 (2.46)	86.8 (3.42)	135.2 (5.32)	112.9 (4.44)	48.9 (1.93)	27.7 (1.09)	19.6 (0.77)	9.8 (0.39)	559.0 (22.01)
Average precipitation days (≥ 0.1 mm)	5.2	4.4	6.1	8.4	12.2	13.8	13.8	12.2	6.9	6.4	6.8	6.5	102.7
Average snowy days	10.9	9.4	10.5	5.9	0.6	0.0	0.0	0.0	0.1	2.5	9.9	13.2	63.0
Average relative humidity (%)	73.3	68.6	63.2	59.6	61.1	69.8	75.3	77.0	72.8	65.9	72.2	74.2	69.4
Mean monthly sunshine hours	180	191	237	221	228	200	198	190	184	198	157	153	2,337
Source 1: Korea Meteorological Administration
Source 2: Deutscher Wetterdienst (sun, 1961–1990), (Note: Station ID for Hyesan is 47016 Use this station ID to locate the sunshine duration) Meteo Climat (extremes)

== Administrative divisions ==
Hyesan City is divided into 25 tong (neighbourhoods) and 4 ri (villages):

- Ch'un-dong (춘동,春洞)
- Hyegang-dong (혜강동)
- Hyehŭng-dong (혜흥동)
- Hyehwa-dong (혜화동)
- Hyejang-dong (혜장동)
- Hyemyŏng-dong (혜명동)
- Hyesan-dong (혜산동)
- Hyesin-dong (혜신동)
- Hyet'an-dong (혜탄동)
- Kangan-dong (강안동)
- Kanggu-dong (강구동)
- Kŏmsan-dong (검산동)
- Masan 1-dong (마산1동)
- Masan 2-dong (마산2동)
- Ryŏnbong 1-dong (련봉1동)
- Ryŏnbong 2-dong (련봉2동)
- Ryŏndu-dong (련두동)
- Sinhŭng-dong (신흥동)
- Songbong 1-dong (송봉1동)
- Songbong 2-dong (송봉2동)
- Sŏnghu-dong (성후동)
- T'apsŏng-dong (탑성동)
- Wiyŏn-dong (위연동)
- Yŏnhŭng-dong (영흥동)
- Yŏnp'ung-dong (연풍동)
- Changal-li (長安里,장안리)
- Rojung-ri (로중리)
- Sinjang-ri (신장리)
- Unch'ong-ri (운총리)

== Economy ==
Hyesan has lumber processing mills, paper mills and textile mills. Since the North Korean economic crisis that intensified in the mid-1990s, the city has suffered from economic stagnation, and some factories in the city have closed. Reports and pictures taken from the Chinese side of the river show a "Ghost City": there is almost no movement in the streets, and at night the city is dark and doesn't have electricity. Residents of the city reputedly wash their clothes in the river because homes have no running water.

First explored in the 1960s, Hyesan mine produces 10,000 tons of copper concentrates annually. This area has 80% of North Korea's available copper, and the North had estimated that it will be able to continue mining copper there for the next forty years. When Kapsan Tongjum Mine, explored during the Japanese colonial period, was finally depleted and closed in 1990, Hyesan Mine became the lifeline of the nation's copper production. At that time, the mine flooded because the pumping device stopped operating due to the lack of electricity across the country. Although the workers at the mine did their best to pump the water, they could not stop the water flowing into the mine at a speed of 480m^{3}/hour. In 1996, during the North's 'Arduous March', electricity was not provided to the mine, leading to flooding in the mineshafts in January 1997. Hyesan Mine flooded again, as did other mines throughout the country, and lost all mining facilities. Since 1998, Kim Jong Il budgeted 8.2 million USD to dewater the mine, and the mine was recovered using electricity and equipment provided by China.

== Transportation ==
Hyesan is connected to other cities in North Korea by road, and by the Paektusan Ch'ŏngnyŏn and Pukbunaeryuk lines of the Korean State Railway.

Hyesan has a trolleybus system, though its actual existence is unknown, according to Pastor Jaeyoung Choi.

== Education ==
Schools in Hyesan include Hyesan High School and Hyesan Girls' School. Higher education institutions include the Hyesan Medical University, the Hyesan University of Agriculture and Forestry, Kim Jŏng-suk College of Education, the Hyesan College of Light Engineering, and the Hyesan University of Industry.

The countryside near Hyesan has various attractions, including the Kwaegung Pavilion, Naegŏk Hot Spring and Mount Paektu.

== Notable people ==
- Yeonmi Park (b. 1993), activist and defector, escaped North Korea in 2007.
- Lee Hyeon-seo (b. 1980), activist and defector, escaped North Korea in 1997.

== See also ==
- List of cities in North Korea
- Administrative divisions of North Korea
- Changbai–Hyesan International Bridge
