= Hapsu station =

Railway station in North Korea

Hapsu 합수

Korean name
- Hangul: 합수역
- Hanja: 合水驛
- Revised Romanization: Hapsu-yeok
- McCune–Reischauer: Hapsu-yŏk

General information
- Location: Paegam, Ryanggang; North Korea
- Owner: Korean State Railway

History
- Opened: 1 November 1933; 92 years ago
- Former names: Chosen Government Railway

Services
Preceding station	Korean State Railway	Following station
Namgye towards Hyesan Ch'ŏngnyŏn	Paektusan Ch'ŏngnyŏn Line	Yanggok towards Kilju Ch'ŏngnyŏn
Location

Hapsu station is a railway station in Paegam county, Ryanggang province, North Korea, on the Paektusan Ch'ŏngnyŏn Line of the Korean State Railway.

The station, along with the rest of the Kilju–Hapsu section, was opened by the Chosen Government Railway on 1 November 1933.

On 9 October 2006 an underground nuclear test was conducted at Punggye-ri Nuclear Test Site, close to P'unggye-ri in Kilju County, causing the closure of the line for 3–4 months.
