= Unhung County =

Unhŭng County 운흥군
- County

Korean transcription(s)
  - Chosŏn'gŭl: 운흥군
  - Hancha: 雲興郡
  - McCune-Reischauer: Unhŭng-gun
  - Revised Romanization: Unheung-gun
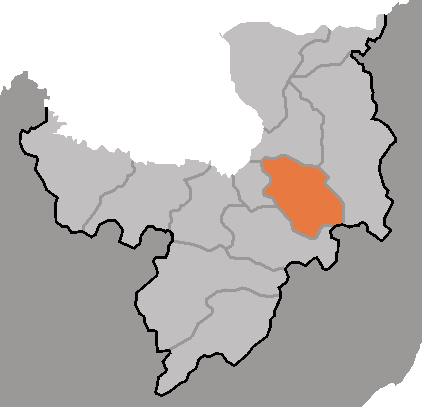
- Map of Ryanggang showing the location of Unhung
- Country: North Korea
- Province: Ryanggang
- Administrative divisions: 1 ŭp, 10 workers' districts, 10 ri

Area
  - Total: 934 km^{2} (361 sq mi)

Population (2008 census)
  - Total: 61,705
  - Density: 66.1/km^{2} (171/sq mi)

Unhŭng County is a kun, or county, in Ryanggang Province, North Korea. It was created following the division of Korea from portions of Hyesan and Kapsan.

== Geography ==
Unhŭng lies on the southwest edge of the Paektu lava plateau, among the Paektu Mountains. The highest of its many peaks is Taegakpong. The chief streams are the Unch'ong River (운총강), Osich'ŏn (오시천) and Taedongch'ŏn (대동천). Some 86% of the county's area is forested.

== Administrative divisions ==
Unhŭng county is divided into 1 ŭp (town), 10 rodongjagu (workers' districts) and 10 ri (villages):

- Unhŭng-ŭp (운흥읍)
- Ilgŏl-lodongjagu (일건로동자구)
- Namjung-rodongjagu (남중로동자구)
- Ryongam-rodongjagu (룡암로동자구)
- Ryŏngha-rodongjagu (령하로동자구)
- Ryongp'o-rodongjagu (룡포로동자구)
- Saengjang-rodongjagu (생장로동자구)
- Taedong-rodongjagu (대동로동자구)
- Taedŏng-rodongjagu (대덕로동자구)
- Taejŏnp'yŏng-rodongjagu (대전평로동자구)
- Taeosich'ŏl-lodongjagu (대오시천로동자구)
- Cham'ul-li (잠운리)
- Changhang-ri (장항리)
- Pog'am-ri (복안리)
- Sangsal-li (상산리)
- Simp'o-ri (심포리)
- Sinjung-ri (신중리)
- Taeha-ri (대하리)
- Taejung-ri (대중리)
- Tongp'o-ri (동포리)
- Tongp'yŏng-ri (동평리)

== Economy ==
There is relatively little agriculture, except for dry-field farms producing potatoes, wheat and soybeans. Logging is the chief industry, with lumber processing the dominant form of manufacturing. There are also mines, extracting the local deposits of copper, iron sulphide, lead, kaolin and tungsten.

== Transportation ==
Unhŭng is served by road and rail; the Paektusan Ch'ŏngnyŏn Line of the Korean State Railway passes through the county.

== See also ==
- Geography of North Korea
- Administrative divisions of North Korea
- Ryanggang
