= Punggye station =

Railway station in North Korea

P'unggye 풍계

Korean name
- Hangul: 풍계역
- Hanja: 豊溪驛
- Revised Romanization: Punggye-yeok
- McCune–Reischauer: P'unggye-yŏk

General information
- Location: P'unggye-ri, Kilju, North Hamgyŏng; North Korea
- Coordinates: 41.1316°N 129.1630°E
- Owner: Korean State Railway

History
- Opened: 1 November 1933; 92 years ago

Services
Preceding station	Korean State Railway	Following station
Chaedŏk towards Hyesan Ch'ŏngnyŏn	Paektusan Ch'ŏngnyŏn Line	Sŏnghu towards Kilju Ch'ŏngnyŏn
Location

P'unggye station is a railway station in P'unggye-ri, Kilju county, North Hamgyŏng province, North Korea, on the Paektusan Ch'ŏngnyŏn Line of the Korean State Railway.

The station, along with the rest of the Kilju–Hapsu section, was opened by the Chosen Government Railway (朝鮮総督府鉄道) on 1 November 1933.

On 9 October 2006 an underground nuclear test was conducted at the Punggye-ri Nuclear Test Site, causing the closure of the line for 3–4 months.
