= Kilju Chongnyon station =

Railway station in Kilju County, North Korea

Kilju Ch'ŏngnyŏn 길주청년
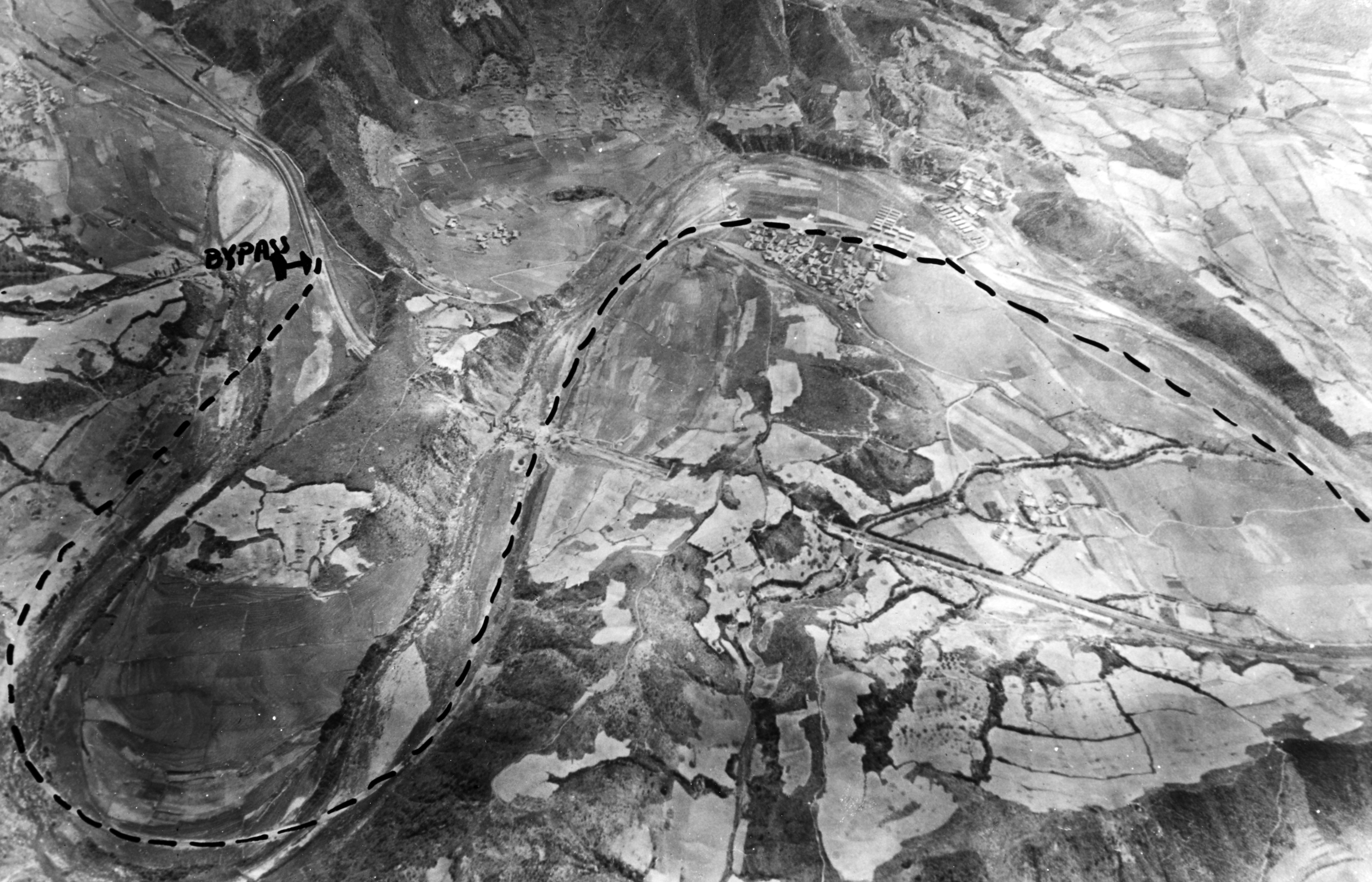
- Kilju Chongnyon station

Korean name
- Hangul: 길주청년역
- Hanja: 吉州青年驛
- Revised Romanization: Giljucheongnyeon-yeok
- McCune–Reischauer: Kiljuch'ŏngnyŏn-yŏk

General information
- Location: Kilju-ŭp, Kilju, North Hamgyŏng; North Korea
- Coordinates: 40.9609°N 129.3233°E
- Owner: Korean State Railway

History
- Opened: 1 November 1933; 92 years ago

Services
Preceding station	Korean State Railway	Following station
Rodong towards P'yŏngyang	P'yŏngra Line	Kŭmsong towards Rajin
Namsŏk towards Hyesan Ch'ŏngnyŏn	Paektusan Ch'ŏngnyŏn Line	Terminus
Location

Kilju Ch'ŏngnyŏn station is a railway station in Kilju-ŭp, Kilju county, North Hamgyŏng province, North Korea. It is the junction point of the Paektusan Ch'ŏngnyŏn and P'yŏngra lines of the Korean State Railway.

Originally called Kilju station (Chosŏn'gŭl: 길주역; Hanja: 吉州駅), the station, along with the rest of the Kilju–Hapsu section, was opened by the Government Railways of Chosen (朝鮮総督府鉄道) on 1 November 1933.

On 9 October 2006 an underground nuclear test was conducted at P'unggye-ri in Kilju County, causing the closure of the line for 3–4 months.

There is a pulp mill and a plywood factory in Kilju that receive raw logs via trains from the Paektusan Ch'ŏngnyŏn line.
