= Paektusan Chongnyon Line =

Railway line in North Korea

Paektusan Ch'ŏngnyŏn Line

Overview
- Other name: Kilhye Line
- Native name: 백두산청년선(白頭山靑年線)
- Status: Operational
- Owner: Chosen Government Railway (1933–1945); Korean State Railway (since 1945)
- Locale: North Hamgyŏng; Ryanggang
- Termini: Kilju Ch'ŏngnyŏn; Hyesan Ch'ŏngnyŏn
- Stations: 22

Service
- Type: Heavy rail, Regional rail
- Depot(s): Hyesan

History
- Opened: Stages between 1933; 92 years ago – 1937; 88 years ago

Technical
- Line length: 141.7 km (88.0 mi)
- Number of tracks: Single track
- Track gauge: 1,435 mm (4 ft 8 1/2 in) standard gauge
- Minimum radius: 250 m (820 ft)
- Electrification: 3000 V DC Catenary
Route map
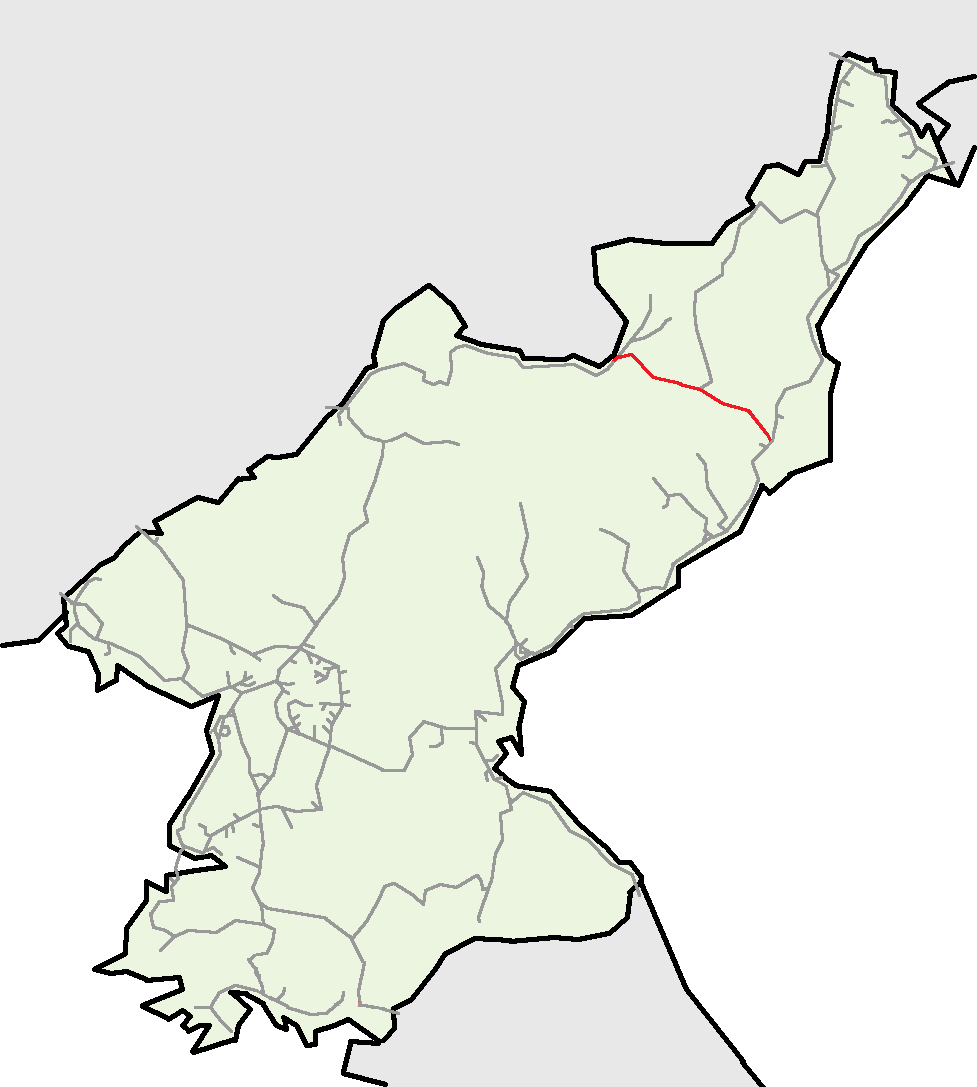

- Paektusan Chongnyon Line
- Hangul: 백두산청년선
- Hanja: 白頭山靑年線
- RR: Baekdusan cheongnyeonseon
- MR: Paektusan ch'ŏngnyŏnsŏn

The Paektusan Ch'ŏngnyŏn Line is an electrified standard-gauge secondary mainline of the Korean State Railway running from Kilju on the P'yŏngra Line to Hyesan on the Pukbunaeryuk Line; it connects to the narrow gauge Paengmu Line at Paeg'am Ch'ŏngnyŏn Station, and to the Samjiyŏn Line at Wiyŏn Ch'ŏngnyŏn Station.

== Description ==
This line traverses a very mountainous area; it has a ruling grade of 33‰ and a minimum curve radius of 250 metres. There are 74 bridges totalling 2,175 m (7,136 ft) and 24 tunnels with a total length of 8,398 m (27,552 ft). The average distance between stations is 7.1 km (4.4 mi). Service facilities on the line are at Hyesan for locomotives and at Wiyŏn and Paeg'am for rolling stock.

== History ==
In order to exploit the Paektusan region's abundant forest and mineral resources, the Yanggang Forest Development Railway planned construction of a line, dubbed Hambuk Line, running from Kilju to Hyesanjin (now Hyesan Ch'ŏngnyŏn) via Hapsu, along with a branch from Hapsu to Komusan, already at the beginning of the 1920s. The Yanggang Forest Development Railway was one of six privately owned railway companies that merged to create the Chosen Railway on 1 September 1923, but work on the planned line was not started before the Chosen Government Railway (Sentetsu) took over the project. Sentetsu finally began construction of the line in May 1931, with the first section, 57.2 km (35.5 mi) from Kilju to Hapsu, being opened on 1 November 1933. The line was then extended several times over the following four years: 12.8 km (8.0 mi) from Hapsu to Paegam was opened on 1 August 1934 and 29.7 km (18.5 mi) from Paegam to Pongduri (now Unhŭng) on 1 September 1935, and the final 42.0 km (26.1 mi) from Pongduri to Hyesanjin was completed on 1 November 1937.

Originally called the Kilhye Line (from the names of the two termini, Kilju and Hyesan), the line received its present name in 1978, when electrification of the line was completed in September of that year.

The planned Komusan–Musan section, using the Hambuk Line name, was finally opened in 1937 by the North Chosen Colonial Railway (a subsidiary of the Chosen Railway), whilst the section between Musan and the Kilhye Line (at Paegam instead of Hapsu as had been planned and named Paengmu Line) was finally completed as a narrow gauge railway by Sentetsu on 1 December 1944.

When the Pukbunaeryuk Line was completed to Hyesan in 1988, a northern east-west connection was finally established connecting the Manp'o Line at Manp'o Ch'ŏngnyŏn to the Paektusan Ch'ŏngnyŏn Line.

On 9 October 2006 an underground nuclear test was conducted at Punggye-ri Nuclear Test Site in Kilju County, causing the closure of the line for 3-4 months after the Paegam tunnel, near Paegam Ch'ŏngnyŏn station, collapsed.

== Services ==
=== Freight ===
Ore and forest products account for almost 93% of freight traffic in the direction towards Kilju, while almost half of the freight in the direction towards Hyesan is coal.

Ore is shipped from Namgye, talc, kaolin and magnesite from Simp'o-ri, and iron sulphide from Unhŭng. Logs are brought from the Paengmu Line to Paegam and forwarded to a large sawmill at Wiyŏn; raw logs are also shipped to the pulp mill and plywood factory in Kilju. The majority of freight moved on the line in the direction towards Hyesan is coal from Sinmyŏngch'ŏn on the P'yŏngra Line destined for use by residents and power plants in the region, along with grains, anthracite, fertiliser, cement etc. for local use.

=== Passenger ===
Passenger traffic on the Paektusan Ch'ŏngnyŏn line is significant, with much of that traffic being for visitors to the various "historic sites of the Revolution" in the region. There are also trains for local travellers, including connection to trains on the Samjiyŏn Line.

The following passenger trains are known to operate on this line:

- Express trains 1/2, operating between P'yŏngyang and Hyesan Ch'ŏngnyŏn, run along this line along its entirety between Kilju and Hyesan;
- Express trains 3/4, operating between West P'yŏngyang and Hyesan Ch'ŏngnyŏn, run along this line along its entirety between Kilju and Hyesan;
- Semi-express trains 101/102 operate between Kilju Ch'ŏngnyŏn and Hyesan;
- Semi-express trains 104-107/108-111, operating between Haeju Ch'ŏngnyŏn and Hyesan Ch'ŏngnyŏn, run along the entirety of this line between Kilju and Hyesan;
- Local trains 652/653 operate between Hyesan Ch'ŏngnyon and Taeoch'ŏn.

== Route ==
A yellow background in the "Distance" box indicates that section of the line is not electrified.

=== Mainline ===
Distance (km)		Station Name		Former Name		
Total	S2S	Transcribed	Chosŏn'gŭl (Hanja)	Transcribed	Chosŏn'gŭl (Hanja)	Connections
0.0	0.0	Kilju Ch'ŏngnyŏn	길주청년 (吉州靑年)	Kilju	길주 (吉州)	P'yŏngra Line
10.3	10.3	Namsŏk	남석 (南夕)			
18.4	8.1	Sŏnghu	성후 (城後)			
22.8	4.4	P'unggye	풍계 (豊溪)			
26.2	3.4	Chaedŏk	재덕 (載德)			
35.2	9.0	Sŏngdŏk	성덕 (城德)			
43.0	7.8	Sado	사도 (蛇島)			
47.4	4.4	Yanggok	양곡 (暘谷)			
57.2	9.8	Hapsu	합수 (合水)			
63.0	5.8	Namgye	남계 (南溪)			
70.0	7.0	Paeg'am Ch'ŏngnyŏn	백암청년 (白岩靑年)	Paeg'am	백암 (白岩)	Paengmu Line
81.0	11.0	Ryŏngha	령하 (嶺下)			
85.9	4.9	Ryŏngnam	령남 (嶺南)			
90.5	4.6	Namjung	남중 (南中)			
95.6	5.1	Saengjang	생장 (生長)			
99.7	4.1	Unhŭng	운흥 (雲興)	Pongduri	봉두리 (鳳頭里)	
108.8	9.1	Poan	보안 (甫安)			Flag stop.
116.1	7.3	Simp'ori	심포리 (深浦里)			
124.6	8.5	Taeoch'ŏn	대오천 (大五川)			Osich'ŏn Line
132.6	8.0	Kŏmsalli	검산리 (劍山里)			
137.1	4.5	Wiyŏn Ch'ŏngnyŏn	위연 (渭淵靑年)			Samjiyŏn Line
141.7	4.6	Hyesan Ch'ŏngnyŏn	혜산청년 (惠山靑年)	Hyesan	혜산 (惠山)	Pukbunaeryuk Line
