= Songdo station (South Pyongan) =

Railway station in North Korea

Songdo 송도

Korean name
- Hangul: 송도역
- Hanja: 松道驛
- Revised Romanization: Songdo-yeok
- McCune–Reischauer: Songdo-yŏk

General information
- Location: Songdo-ri, Anju, South P'yŏngan; North Korea
- Owner: Korean State Railway

Services
| Preceding station | Korean State Railway | Following station |
|---|---|---|
| Ch'ŏngch'ŏn'gang Terminus | Kubongsan Line | Kubongsan towards East Namhŭng |
| Maengjungri Terminus | Namhŭng Line | Namhŭng Terminus |

Songdo station (Korean: 송도역) is a railway station in Songdo-ri, Anju, South P'yŏngan, North Korea. It is on located on the Kubongsan Line and the Namhŭng Line of the Korean State Railway.
