= Maengjungri station =

Railway station in Pakchon County, North Korea

Maengjungri 맹중리

Korean name
- Hangul: 맹중리역
- Hanja: 孟中里驛
- Revised Romanization: Maengjungni-yeok
- McCune–Reischauer: Maengjungri-yŏk

General information
- Location: Maengjung-rodongjagu, Pakch'ŏn County, North P'yŏngan Province; North Korea
- Coordinates: 39°38′55″N 125°35′50″E
- Owner: Korean State Railway

History
- Opened: 1 October 1914
- Original company: Chosen Government Railway

Services
Preceding station	Korean State Railway	Following station
Unjŏn towards Dandong (China)	P'yŏngŭi Line	Ch'ŏngch'ŏn'gang towards P'yŏngyang
Terminus	Namhŭng Line	Songdo towards Namhŭng
Pakch'ŏn Terminus	Pakch'ŏn Line	Terminus
Location

Maengjungri station (Korean: 맹중리역) is a railway station in Maengjung-rodongjagu, Pakch'ŏn County, North P'yŏngan Province, North Korea. It is on located on the P'yŏngŭi Line of the Korean State Railway. It is the starting point of the Namhŭng Line, which leads to the important Namhŭng Youth Chemical Complex in Namhŭng. It is also the junction point between the P'yŏngŭi Line and the Pakch'ŏn Line.

== History ==
The station was opened by the Chosen Government Railway on 1 October 1914.
