= Simwonsa =

Simwonsa may refer to:

- Simwonsa (Seongju) - Korean Buddhist temple located in Suryun-myeon, Seongju-gun, North Gyeongsan Province, South Korea
- Simwonsa (Pakchon) - Korean Buddhist temple located in Sangyang-ri, Pakchon County, North Phyongan Province, North Korea
- Simwonsa (Yontan) - Korean Buddhist temple located in Yŏntan-gun, North Hwanghae Province, North Korea
