= Pakchon station =

Former railway station in North Korea

Pakch'ŏn 박천

Korean name
- Hangul: 박천역
- Hanja: 博川驛
- Revised Romanization: Bakcheon-yeok
- McCune–Reischauer: Pakch'ŏn-yŏk

General information
- Location: Pakch'ŏn-ŭp, Pakch'ŏn County, North P'yŏngan Province; North Korea
- Owner: Korean State Railway

History
- Opened: 10 December 1926
- Closed: ?
- Original company: Chosen Government Railway

Services
Preceding station	Korean State Railway	Following station
Terminus	Pakch'ŏn Line	Maengjungri Terminus

Pakch'ŏn station (Korean: 박천역) was a railway station in Pakch'ŏn-ŭp, Pakch'ŏn County, North P'yŏngan Province, North Korea. It was the terminus of the Pakch'ŏn Line of the Korean State Railway.

== History ==
The station was originally opened on 10 December 1926 by the Chosen Government Railway, at the same time as the rest of the line from Maengjungri to Pakch'ŏn.
