= Namhung station =

Railway station in North Korea

Namhŭng 남흥

Korean name
- Hangul: 남흥역
- Hanja: 南興驛
- Revised Romanization: Namheung-yeok
- McCune–Reischauer: Namhŭng-yŏk

General information
- Location: Namhŭng, Pakch'ŏn County, North P'yŏngan Province; North Korea
- Owner: Korean State Railway
- Platforms: 3 (1 island)
- Tracks: 5

History
- Opened: 1976

Services
| Preceding station | Korean State Railway | Following station |
|---|---|---|
| Songdo towards Maengjungri | Namhŭng Line | Terminus |

Namhŭng station is a railway station in Namhŭng, Pakch'ŏn County, North P'yŏngan Province, North Korea. It is the terminus of the Namhŭng Line.

== History ==
The station was opened by the Korean State Railway in 1976 to serve the Namhŭng Youth Chemical Complex opened that year, located just east of Namhŭng station, which is extensively served by rail.

Between 2006 and 2010, the station's tracks were electrified, and around 2009 a servicing facility for the diesel locomotives used to shunt the yard and move cars between the station and the chemical plant were built here.
