= Unjon station =

Railway station in Unjon County, North Korea

Unjŏn 운전

Korean name
- Hangul: 운전역
- Hanja: 雲田驛
- Revised Romanization: Unjeonnyeok
- McCune–Reischauer: Unjŏnnyŏk

General information
- Location: Unjŏn-ŭp, Unjŏn County, North P'yŏngan Province; North Korea
- Coordinates: 39°39′42″N 125°31′9″E
- Owner: Korean State Railway

Services
Preceding station	Korean State Railway	Following station
Unam towards Dandong (China)	P'yŏngŭi Line	Maengjungri towards P'yŏngyang
Location

Unjŏn station (Korean: 운전역) is a railway station in Unjŏn-ŭp, Unjŏn County, North P'yŏngan Province, North Korea. It is on located on the P'yŏngŭi Line of the Korean State Railway.

== History ==
Originally opened as Ryŏngmi station, it received its current name in July 1945.
