= Unam station =

Railway station in Chongju, North Korea

Coordinates: 39.6016°N 125.4010°E

Unam 운암

Korean name
- Hangul: 운암역
- Hanja: 雲岩驛
- Revised Romanization: Unam-yeok
- McCune–Reischauer: Unam-yŏk

General information
- Location: Unjŏn County, North P'yŏngan Province; North Korea
- Owner: Korean State Railway

Services
Preceding station	Korean State Railway	Following station
Koŭp towards Dandong (China)	P'yŏngŭi Line	Unjŏn towards P'yŏngyang
Location

Unam station is a railway station in Unjŏn County, North P'yŏngan Province, North Korea. It is on located on the P'yŏngŭi Line of the Korean State Railway.

== History ==
Originally opened as Unjŏn station, it received its current name in July 1945.
