= Chongchongang station =

Railway station in Pakchon County, North Korea

Ch'ŏngch'ŏn'gang 청천강

Korean name
- Hangul: 청천강역
- Hanja: 淸川江驛
- Revised Romanization: Cheongcheongang-yeok
- McCune–Reischauer: Ch'ŏngch'ŏn'gang-yŏk

General information
- Location: Maengha-ri, Pakch'ŏn County, North P'yŏngan Province; North Korea
- Coordinates: 39°38′06″N 125°36′20″E
- Owner: Korean State Railway

Services
Preceding station	Korean State Railway	Following station
Maengjungri towards Dandong (China)	P'yŏngŭi Line	Sinanju Ch'ŏngnyŏn towards P'yŏngyang
Terminus	Kubongsan Line	Songdo towards East Namhŭng
Location

Ch'ŏngch'ŏn'gang station (Korean: 청천강역) is a signal halt in Maengha-ri, Pakch'ŏn County, North P'yŏngan Province, North Korea. It is on located on the P'yŏngŭi Line of the Korean State Railway, and is the starting point of the Kubongsan Line. It is situated on the bank of the Ch'ŏngch'ŏn River, from which it gets its name.
