= Taxation in North Korea =

Officially, North Korea does not have domestic taxes and claims to be the world's only tax-free country. However, the North Korean government still collects revenue from its citizens in the form of hidden taxation through various sales taxes. In particular, the turnover tax from consumption provides for the majority of the state revenue in North Korea. The North Korean government, therefore, does collect revenue, in a manner which has been compared to a taxation system by international observers. However, inside North Korea the word "tax" is not used, and the term for state revenue has been variously translated as "socialist income accounting", "socialist economic management income", and in similar fashion. "Tax Abolition Day" is observed annually on 1 April in North Korea.

Direct taxes, such as income tax, were officially eliminated in 1974 as "remnants of an antiquated society". Enterprise "transaction income money", somewhat similar to the modern value-added tax, later replaced by "national enterprise profit money", continued as a form of corporate taxation. The elimination of direct taxes did not have a significant effect on state revenue because the overwhelming proportion of government funds—an average of 98.1 percent during 1961–1970—was from sales taxes such as turnover taxes, deductions from profits paid by state enterprises, and various user fees on machinery and equipment, irrigation facilities, television sets, water, and so on. This is in line with similar practices in other communist states.

Agricultural tax-in-kind introduced in 1947 was abolished in North Korea in 1966, as the process of collectivization of North Korean agriculture ended. Another form of tax in North Korea is periodic requirements for citizens to work free of charge on government projects.

Special taxation laws also affect the special economic zones in North Korea (in particular the Kaesong Industrial Region) where foreign companies are allowed to operate. There is therefore corporate tax in North Korea, as outlined by the Processing Trade Law, Lock Gate Law and Copyright Law, and related legislation, including laws on tax evasion. An estimate of this corporate tax in early 2000s was for 10–14%. North Korean workers there are subject to the usual indirect taxation: their wages are paid in hard currencies by foreign companies to the North Korean government, which then pays the workers in North Korean currency, minus the value of insurance taxes and socio-cultural fees. A 2013 estimate of the taxes on individual Kaesŏng Industrial Region workers was 45% of their wages.

Enterprises outside special economic zones make payments to the state based on their profits, essentially a form of corporate tax. As of 2018, after tax changes made in August 2016, the rate was progressive dependent on the level of profits, at a rate of up to 32.5% in released financial reports.
