= North Korean support for Iran during the Iran–Iraq War =

Overview of North Korea's role in the Iran–Iraq War

North Korea and Iran.

North Korea supported Iran during the Iran–Iraq War for oil and foreign exchange by selling both domestically produced arms to Iran and serving as an intermediary for deniable sales by the Soviet Union, Soviet satellites, and China. Sales began with a delivery of Soviet artillery ammunition in October 1980 after the Iran–Iraq War had begun in September.

This soon followed by a billion-dollar sale of Chinese equipment from North Korean stocks along with locally-built T-54/T-55 Soviet-designed tanks. Payment was made in the form of cash and crude oil. Delivery of this order spread from 1981 to 1983. By 1982, Iran's major military supplier was North Korea, with sales in that year of $800 million. It provided, to Iran, both indigenously produced Soviet-standard equipment, as well as acting as an intermediary for both China and the Soviet Union. Some came from North Korean military stocks and were replaced by the originating country, while others were merely transshipped, still in the original factory crate. Iran rejected much of the equipment made in North Korea because of its poor quality.

North Korea sold arms primarily as a source of foreign exchange. North Korea demanded the currency of the United States, as payment. Sales ended only after North Korea's nuclear test, in October 2006, caused the passage of United Nations Security Council Resolution 1718 embargo.

== Motivations for policy ==
North Korea's relations with the rest of the world, even with ostensibly close allies such as China and the Soviet Union, vary over time. When North Korea and China were "as close as lips and teeth," it was "a natural conduit for Chinese arms to Iran" to do deniable arms sales. China's main arms factories were conveniently close to North Korea.

When relations were frosty with Beijing, North Korea could work with Moscow. A USD $18 million shipment of SA-7 surface-to-air missiles, withdrawn from Polish inventory at Soviet orders, went to Iran in December 1986.

== Export controls ==
North Korea's basic control over exports is that either the receiver or the supplier needed to pay in U.S. dollars. North Korea appeared as the source of record for many arms transfer that actually came from the Soviet Union or China, but for which those major powers wanted deniability. In some cases, North Korea shipped equipment from its own military service, and had it replaced. In other cases, it was a simple pass-through of equipment still in crates.

In yet other cases, North Korea would ship Soviet- or Chinese-designed piece of equipment that it built, under license, in its own factories.

== Military training and advice ==
Following a 1985 visit to North Korea by the speaker of the Iranian parliament, Ayatollah Akbar Hashemi Rafsanjani, North Korea military advisers started working both in direct military training and the development of military industry.

North Korea trained Iranian gunners to operate the North Korean mobile surface-to-air system and the Islamic Revolutionary Guard Corps in unconventional warfare techniques.

== Land warfare ==
=== Tanks and other armored fighting vehicles ===
Iran could not replace its tank losses during 1983 and 1985. As a result, Iran tended to use tanks as artillery or in support of infantry, rather than in independent maneuver actions. When it could, it bought more North Korean tanks.

Tanks, sold primarily to the Middle East in the early 1980s, made up the bulk of North Korean sales, principally to Iran.

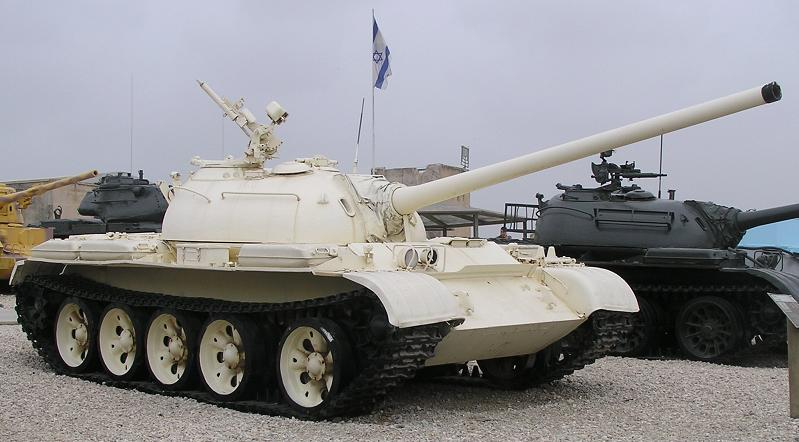
The T-54 can be recognized by the dome-shaped ventilator on the turret roof, in front of the loader's hatch, which the T-55 lacks

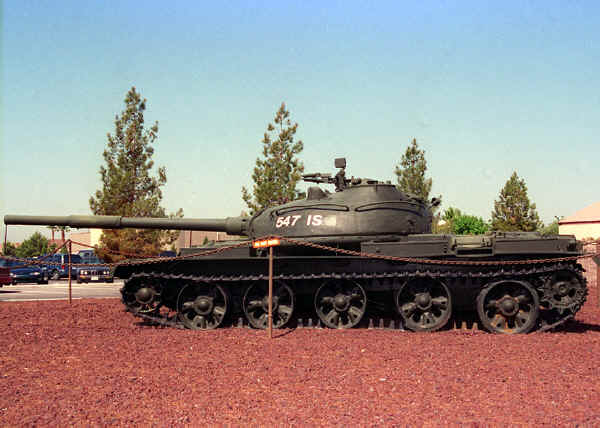
A primary recognition feature of the T-62 is the progressively larger gap between sets of road wheels. The very similar T-54/55 has one wide gap between the first and second wheel.

Since the late 1970s, North Korea has produced an estimated 600 tanks similar to T-62 tanks. It sold some to Iran. It also bought T-62 and modern T-72 tanks from Libya or Syria.

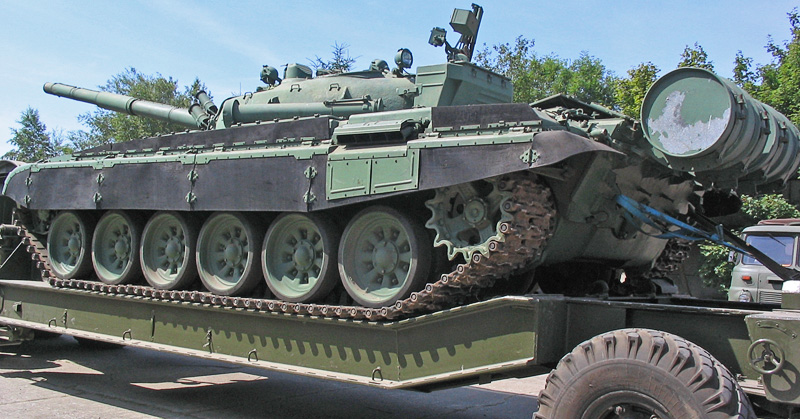
T-72 on tank transporter

=== Infantry equipment ===
Infantry weapons appropriate to light infantry were purchased from North Korea, Czechoslovakia, China, and Libya. These complemented Heckler and Koch G3 rifles built under license in Iran. So were large stocks of Soviet style weapons obtained from North Korea.

North Korea provided 12,000 machine guns and rifles and 1000 mortars.

=== Artillery ===
North Korea, in its first major transaction, provided 400 artillery pieces to Iran. The country emphasizes massive artillery in its own operations. It improvised North Korea self-propelled artillery by mounting cannon on existing military vehicles, but North Korean ordnance factories produce a variety of self-propelled guns, howitzers, and gun-howitzers in 122 to 155mm; the KOKSAN heavy gun (probably a Soviet gun mounted, by North Korea, on a tank chassis); and multiple rocket launchers, the latter, from 107 to 240mm, usually truck-mounted. In 1987, Iran bought the 170 mm KOKSAN self-propelled cannon from North Korea, where it was made, possibly from older Soviet tubes. At the time, using rocket-assisted projectile, it had the longest range of any artillery piece in the world.

=== Anti-tank weapons ===
Iran used its supplies of U.S. antitank guided missiles (ATGM) against Iraqi armor, but managed a very poor hit probability, and soon depleted its stocks. Training could have been a factor, but another possible factor was that Iran was not proficient at the tactics that would bring a tank into optimum range of the launcher. In practice, the Iranians found high rates of fire more important than high kill probability, as had been the experience of Egypt in the Sinai in 1973.

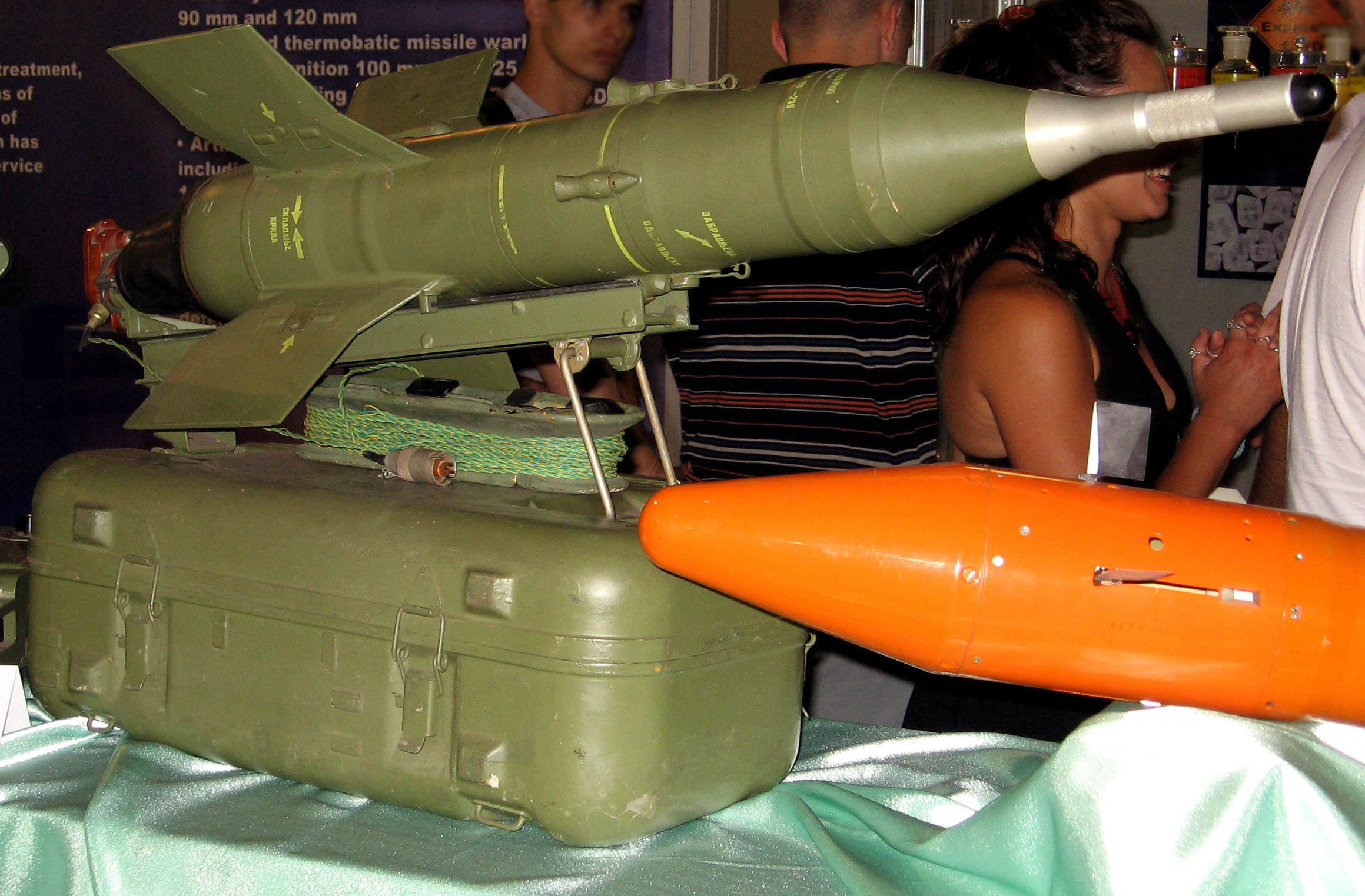
Sagger ATGM

The war became slower and more static after 1982, with lower rates of fire and more accurate aiming, but most ATGMs were fired against static targets, such as bunkers or dug-in tanks. Such targets made range and warhead size critical factors.

Even with the slower pace, Iran experienced shortages of U.S. missiles, and bought Soviet-designed 9K11 Malyutka (NATO reporting name AT-3 Sagger) ATGMs and other weapons from North Korea, China, Syria and Libya. Unguided rocket launchers were also needed. When Iran could, it bought black-market U.S. TOW ATGMs, or obtained them through special circumstances such as the Iran–Contra Affair.

=== Logistics ===
In this war, Iran had several logistical problems. Without the ability to buy spare parts, it had more and more difficulty keeping its Western equipment working. When it had parts or ammunition, its logistical control systems seemed to distribute them randomly, rather like the U.S. logistics system left behind in South Vietnam, which proved too complex for the available personnel.

Western systems tend to have minimum numbers of parts distributed by a high-tech logistics system, where the Soviet bloc approach had been to deliver massive quantities of everything. The latter seemed more effective for Iran.

== Naval warfare ==
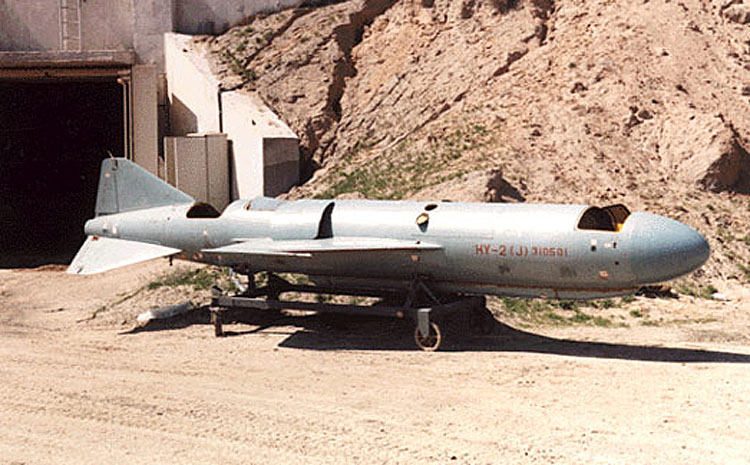
Silkworm/HY-1/CSS-C-2

Selling North Korean anti-shipping missiles (NATO codename CSS-C-2, usually called Silkworm) via North Korea provided China with plausible denials of sales in 1987 and 1988. Arms from the Soviet Union also may have been channeled in the same manner. While this is normally considered an anti-shipping missile, Iran used them, in 1987, against both Kuwaiti land installations and ships in Kuwaiti waters, including a U.S.-reflagged tanker. There is also an air-launched version, the C-801, in Iranian Air Force use.

== Air defense ==
=== Antiaircraft artillery ===
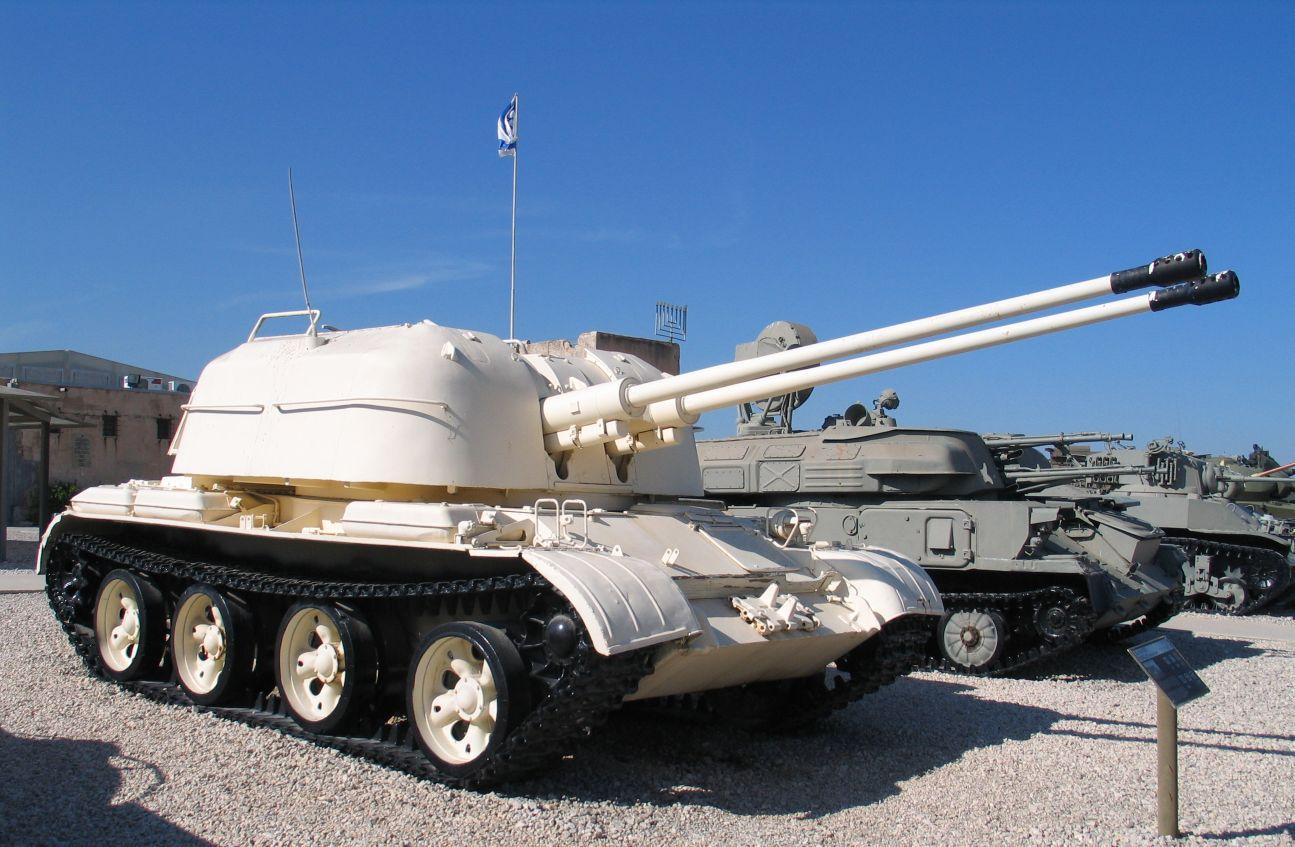
57mm self-propelled AA gun

The first large Iranian purchase included 600 anti-aircraft artillery pieces. While the specific types sold are not known, Iran's Soviet and Chinese AAA includes the 57 mm AZP S-60 (Chinese version designated T-59) towed 57 mm. A self-propelled version is the ZSU-57-2, which was replaced by the highly regarded radar-controlled 23 mm ZSU-23-4 "Shilka", known to be part of the Kharg Island air defenses.

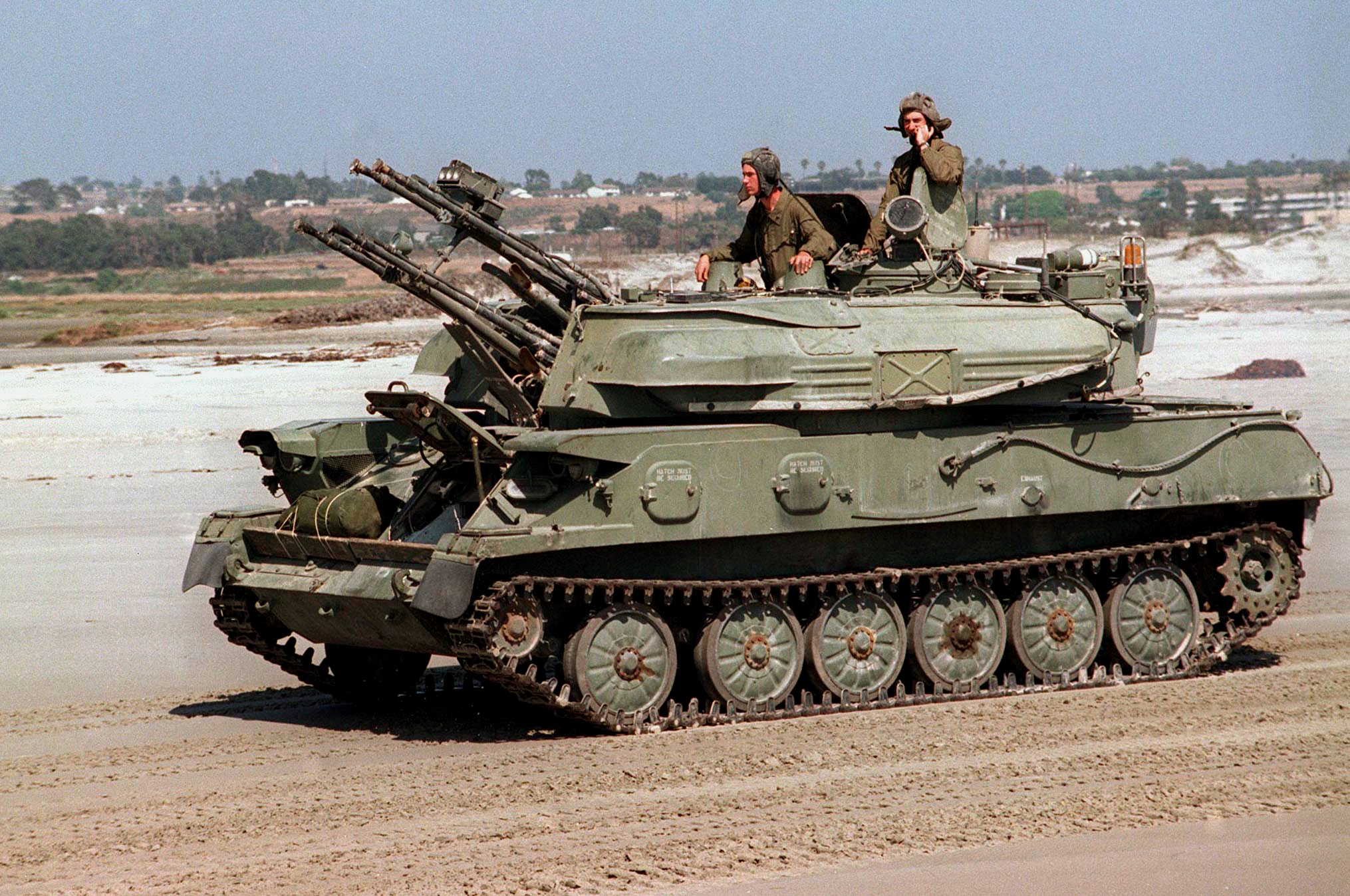
ZSU-23-4 radar-controlled SPAAG

=== Surface-to-air missiles ===
According to the New York Times, Jean-Louis Gantzer, a French arms dealer, described himself as a broker for a German arms merchant, with the ultimate source being the Soviet Union. Gantzer said he thought the Soviets were simply trying to get hard currency, although the newspaper was unable to confirm all details. The shipment, made via North Korea in December 1986, included SA-7 shoulder-fired surface-to-air missiles. He said the deal had been made on March 17, 1986, with Gen. Amir Moayed, Iranian Deputy Minister of Defense. The German firm, was a Channel Islands dummy company owned by Peter Mulack, a West German who lived in the United States.

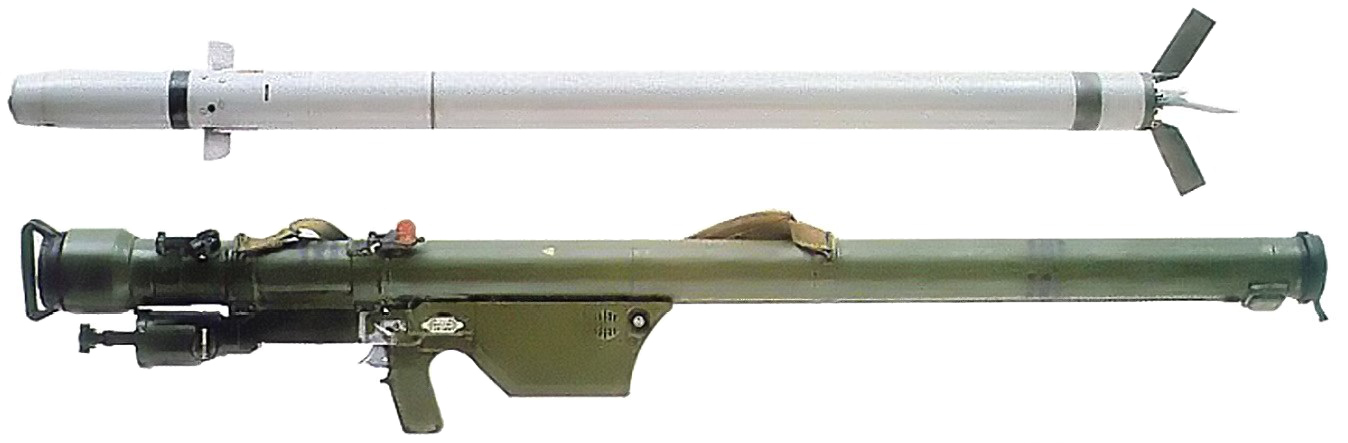
SA-7 missile and launcher

Details on the SA-7 missiles were to come from a Soviet-controlled Polish firm, Perenosny Zenitiny Raketny Kompleks. Gantzer, acting for Praetor Trading, posted, a $100,000 performance bond using the London branch of Commerzbank A.G., a West German bank. A Swiss firm, C. Wuppesahl A.G., insured the shipment, and the Union Bank of Switzerland issued a letter of credit for $18,640,000 to Iran. The funds went to Commerzbank, London, where commissions were taken, and then to a Russian account at the West Berlin branch of Deutsche Bank A.G., the largest West German bank.

The North Korean Embassy in Vienna end user certificate stated the weapons were destined for Pyongyang. Cargo aircraft were chartered in Israel, flew to Poland, were loaded, and then flew to Cyprus. After refueling, they flew toward Iran, where they were escorted by Iranian aircraft.

== Missile technology ==
=== Surface-to-Surface ===
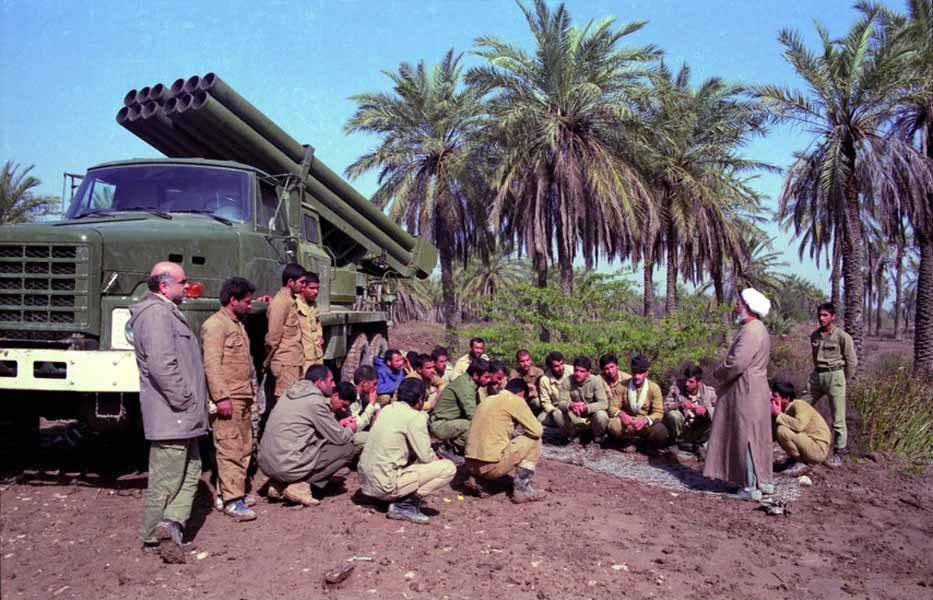
Iranian soldiers listen to a sermon during the Iran-Iraq war with a North-Korean built M-1985 multiple launch rocket system in the background

Iran's first Scud missiles came from North Korea and Libya. The Wisconsin Project on Arms Control and Cordesman both say the first shipment came from Libya, but that North Korea was the larger source. In either case Iran imported 90-100 missiles from the DPRK, most of which were promptly used in combat: According to the U.S. Defense Department, Iran fired nearly 100 Scuds at Iraq between 1985 and 1988.

Iraq also launched a series of relatively large-scale air and missile strikes against Iranian cities. It carried out as many as 158 air strikes over a three-day period in March. It hit nearly 30 towns and cities, and struck as deep as Tehran. Iran responded to these strikes on March 12 and 14 by launching its first Scud B strikes against Iraqi cities, using what seem to have been Libyan supplied missiles, although they may have come from Syria and other deliveries came later from China and/or North Korea.

== See also ==
- International aid to combatants in the Iran–Iraq War
- Iran–North Korea relations
- Foreign relations of North Korea
- Foreign relations of Iran
