= Sungryong Hall =

Shrine in Pyongyang, North Korea

Coordinates: 39°1′28″N 125°45′4″E

- Hangul: 숭령전
- Hanja: 崇靈殿
- RR: Sungnyeongjeon
- MR: Sungnyŏngjŏn

Sungnyong Hall is a shrine dedicated to the founding kings of ancient Korea located in the center of Pyongyang, North Korea. It is listed as National Treasure #6.

== History ==
Sungnyong Hall was constructed in 1429 for the veneration of the mythical founder of the Korean nation, Tangun, and was originally called Tangun Hall.

The shrine was enlarged under the Yi dynasty in 1725, as they sought to promote their legitimacy by emphasizing their connection to Tangun and promoting his veneration. The temple's name was changed to Sungnyong Hall after they expanded its dedication to include Tongmyong, the founder of the kingdom of Koguryo.

The temple was bombed by US forces during the Korean War, which destroyed the caretaker's quarters and shrine storehouses. Today, only the main hall, ceremonial altar, and entrance gate remain of the shrine.
