= Namhung Line =

Railway line in North Korea

Namhŭng Line

Overview
- Native name: 남흥선 (南興線)
- Status: Operational
- Owner: Korean State Railway
- Locale: South P'yŏngan
- Termini: Maengjungri; Namhŭng
- Stations: 3

Service
- Type: Heavy rail, freight rail
- Operator(s): Korean State Railway
- Depot(s): Namhŭng

History
- Opened: 1976

Technical
- Line length: 6.7 km (4.2 mi)
- Number of tracks: Single track
- Track gauge: 1,435 mm (4 ft 8 1/2 in) standard gauge

- Namhung Line
- Hangul: 남흥선
- Hanja: 南興線
- RR: Namheungseon
- MR: Namhŭngsŏn

The Namhŭng Line is an electrified standard-gauge secondary line of the Korean State Railway in South P'yŏngan Province, North Korea, running from Maengjungri on the P'yŏngŭi Line to Namhŭng.

A maintenance facility for the diesel shunting locomotives that move freight cars between Namhŭng Station and the chemical complex was opened just east of the station in 2009-2010.

== History ==
The line was opened by the Korean State Railway in 1976 to serve the Namhŭng Youth Chemical Complex. The line was electrified sometime between 2006 and 2010.

== Services ==
Though the bulk of the freight traffic on this line is to and from the chemical complex, it also serves the Anju No. 121 Paper Factory located just west of the chemical complex.

Within the Namhŭng Youth Chemical Complex itself, the sodium bicarbonate plant, the urea fertiliser plant, the polyethylene sheeting plant, a tank farm for storage of liquid chemicals, and the polyester spinning factory are all served by rail. The anthracite gasification plant which was opened in 2013 is also rail-served, receiving anthracite coal for processing via a dedicated railyard.

== Route ==
A yellow background in the "Distance" box indicates that section of the line is not electrified.

Distance (km)		Station Name		Former Name		
Total	S2S	Transcribed	Chosŏn'gŭl (Hanja)	Transcribed	Chosŏn'gŭl (Hanja)	Connections (former)
0.0	0.0	Maengjungri	맹중리 (孟中里)			P'yŏngŭi Line (Pakch'ŏn Line)
2.4	2.4	Songdo	송도 (松道)			Kubongsan Line
6.7	4.3	Namhŭng	남흥 (南興)			
