= The North Korean Army: History, Structure, Daily Life =

2022 book by Fyodor Tertitskiy

- Author: Fyodor Tertitskiy
- Language: English
- Series: Routledge Research on Korea
- Subject: Korean People's Army, Military history of North Korea
- Genre: Military studies
- Publisher: Routledge
- Publication date: 27 September 2022
- Publication place: London, England
- Media type: Print (hardcover and paperback), e-book
- Pages: 248
- ISBN: 978-1-032-14715-4 (hardcover)
- Dewey Decimal: 355/.0095193
- LC Class: UA853.K5 T47 2023
- Website: https://www.routledge.com/The-North-Korean-Army-History-Structure-Daily-Life/Tertitskiy/p/book/9781032148236

The North Korean Army: History, Structure, Daily Life is a 2022 book by Fyodor Tertitskiy, published by Routledge as part of its Routledge Research on Korea series. The book examines the history, organisational structure and everyday life of personnel in the Korean People's Army (KPA), the armed forces of North Korea.

== Contents ==
The book consists of five principal chapters, covering the historical development of the Korean People's Army, its organisational structure and the daily lives of military personnel.

The first two chapters examine the army during the Korean War and its postwar development. The third chapter describes the structure and organization of the KPA. The final two chapters focus on the experiences of enlisted soldiers and officers, respectively.

Topics discussed include military discipline, systems of reprimands and commendations, the position of women in the armed forces, military remuneration and food provisions for service personnel.

== Reception ==
In a review for NK News, David Tizzard praised the book for its thorough research, drawing on Russian, Korean, Chinese and English sources, as well as its accessible writing style. He commended Tertitskiy's attention to historical detail, clear explanations of complex topics and inclusion of rare photographs, arguing that the book offered a broader history of North Korea rather than focusing solely on military affairs. Tizzard also appreciated the author's understated humour and his coverage of subjects such as military life, education, regionalism and economic conditions. He concluded that it offered valuable information and insights into the North Korean military that were difficult to find elsewhere, but criticised the book's high price and plain cover design..

The book was also reviewed by Glyn Ford in Asian Affairs. He praised the book for providing previously unavailable details about the Korean People's Army's organisation, customs and everyday practices, particularly in its later sections. However, he criticised the historical section for devoting excessive attention to disputes over the army's founding, while noting the lack of coverage of North Korean military activities abroad. Ford also criticised the book's extensive footnotes and high price.

== See also ==
- Korean People's Army
- Military history of North Korea
- Bibliography of North Korea
