= Tax in kind =

Tax in kind or tax-in-kind is any taxation that is paid in kind, that is with goods or services rather than money. Some notable examples of tax in kind include:

- corvée, a tax paid in manual labour, such as on a public works project.
- fisc, in the Frankish kingdoms of the Medieval period
- food render, a feorm or tax-in-kind provided through royal vills in Anglo-Saxon England
- kharaj, instituted during the period of the Islamic Empire
- a tax on agricultural produce imposed by the Confederate States of America in 1863
- Prodnalog, paid by private farms in Soviet Russia during the 1920s under the New Economic Policy.
- An agricultural tax in North Korea imposed in 1947 and abolished in 1966

== See also ==
- Barter
