= Kubongsan Line =

Railway line in North Korea

Overview
- Native name: 구봉산선 (龜鳳山線)
- Status: Operational
- Owner: Korean State Railway
- Locale: South P'yŏngan
- Termini: Ch'ŏngch'ŏn'gang; East Namhŭng
- Stations: 4

Service
- Type: Heavy rail, Passenger & freight rail Regional rail
- Operator: Korean State Railway

History
- Opened: 1970s

Technical
- Line length: 12.2 km (7.6 mi)
- Number of tracks: Single track
- Track gauge: 1,435 mm (4 ft 8 1/2 in) standard gauge

- Kubongsan Line
- Hangul: 구봉산선
- Hanja: 龜鳳山線
- RR: Gubongsanseon
- MR: Kubongsansŏn

The Kubongsan Line is an electrified standard-gauge secondary line of the Korean State Railway in South P'yŏngan Province, North Korea, running from Ch'ŏngch'ŏn'gang on the P'yŏngŭi Line to East Namhŭng.

== History ==
The line was opened by the Korean State Railway in the 1970s.

== Services ==
The line serves the February 20 Factory of the Korean People's Army near Kubongsan, as well as the Anju Silicate Brick Factory (안주씨리카트벽돌공장, Anju Ssirik'at'ŭ Pyŏktol Kongjang) adjacent to East Namhŭng Station. The brick factory was opened in December 1986.

== Route ==
A yellow background in the "Distance" box indicates that section of the line is not electrified.

Distance (km)		Station Name		Former Name		
Total	S2S	Transcribed	Chosŏn'gŭl (Hanja)	Transcribed	Chosŏn'gŭl (Hanja)	Connections
0.0	0.0	Ch'ŏngch'ŏn'gang	청천강 (淸川江)			P'yŏngŭi Line
2.4	2.4	Songdo	송도 (松道)			Namhŭng Line
8.5	6.1	Kubongsan	구봉산 (龜鳳山)			Ch'ŏnghwaryŏk Line
12.2	3.7	East Namhŭng (Tongnamhŭng)	동남흥 (東南興)	Ryonghŭng	령흥 (龍興)	
