= Pakchon Line =

Railway line in North Korea

Pakch'ŏn Line

Overview
- Native name: 박천선(博川線)
- Status: Closed
- Owner: Chosen Government Railway (1926–1945); Korean State Railway (since 1945)
- Locale: Pakch'ŏn-gun, North P'yŏngan
- Termini: Maengjungri; Pakch'ŏn
- Stations: 3

Service
- Type: Heavy rail, Passenger & freight rail Regional rail

History
- Opened: 10 December 1926

Technical
- Line length: 9.3 km (5.8 mi)
- Number of tracks: Single track
- Track gauge: 1,435 mm (4 ft 8 1/2 in) standard gauge
Route map
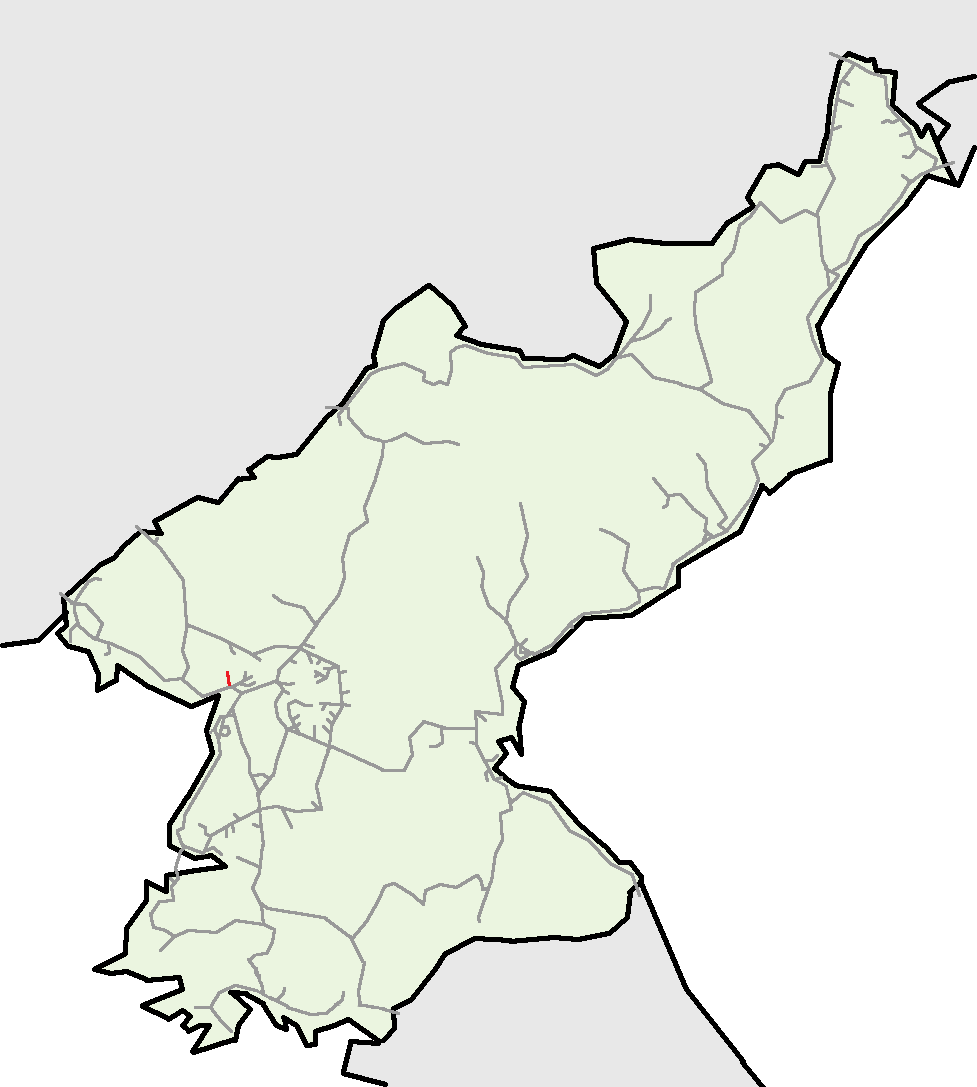

- Pakchon Line
- Hangul: 박천선
- Hanja: 博川線
- RR: Bakcheonseon
- MR: Pakch'ŏnsŏn

The Pakch'ŏn Line is a former non-electrified standard-gauge secondary line of the Korean State Railway in Pakch'ŏn County, North P'yŏngan Province, North Korea, running from Maengjungri on the P'yŏngŭi Line to Pakch'ŏn.

== History ==
The line was originally opened by the Chosen Government Railway on 10 December 1926. On 10 August 1946 it was nationalised by the Provisional People’s Committee for North Korea along with all other railways in the Soviet-occupied part of Korea, becoming part of the Korean State Railway.

== Route ==
A yellow background in the "Distance" box indicates that section of the line is not electrified.

Distance (km)		Station Name		Former Name		
Total	S2S	Transcribed	Chosŏn'gŭl (Hanja)	Transcribed	Chosŏn'gŭl (Hanja)	Connections (former)
~~0.0~~	~~0.0~~	Maengjungri	맹중리 (孟中里)			(P'yŏngŭi Line)
~~5.6~~	~~5.6~~	Ilwŏn	일원 (一院)			Closed
~~9.3~~	~~3.7~~	Pakch'ŏn	박천 (博川)			Closed
