= Simwonsa (Pakchon) =

Buddhist temple in North Korea

- Hangul: 심원사
- Hanja: 深源寺
- RR: Simwonsa
- MR: Simwŏnsa

Simwonsa (Korean: 심원사; Hanja: 深源寺) is an historic Korean Buddhist temple located in Sangyang-ri, Pakchon County, North Pyongan Province, North Korea. It is listed as the 54th National Treasure of North Korea.

The temple was built in the ninth century and rebuilt in 1368. It features examples of painting and wood processing techniques used by craftsmen of the era.

A carving on the temple says it was built by Hyon Uk (786-868). The temple site has three buildings, Pogwang Shrine (the main building), the Chongphung and the Hyangro Pavilions. The Pogwang site is described as a "colorfully painted building ... decorated with dragon, phoenix and other sculptures". On the wall of the Chongphung Pavilion is a wooden fish 2.5 meters long, weighing 100 kilograms.
