= Simwonsa (Seongju) =

Buddhist temple in South Korea

- 심원사
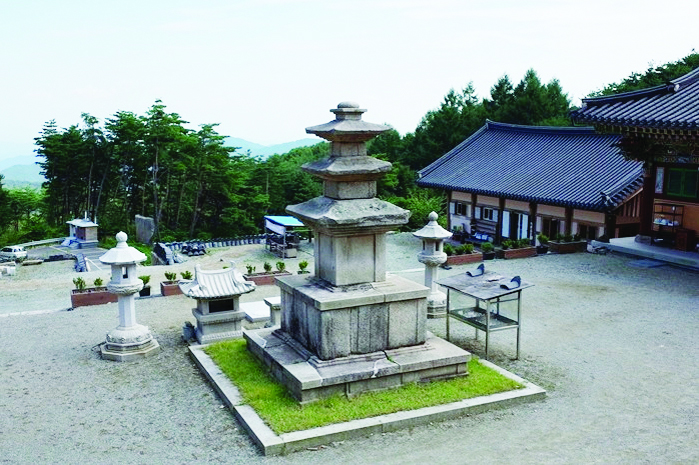
- Simwonsa Temple in South Korea

Religion
- Affiliation: Jogye Order of Korean Buddhism

Location
- Location: 17-56 Gayasan Botanic Garden-gil Suryun-myeon Seongju-gun North Gyeongsan Province (Korean: 경상북도 성주군 수륜면 가야산식물원길 17-56)
- Country: South Korea
- Interactive map of Simwonsa
- Coordinates: 35°48′02.3″N 128°08′09.1″E

Simwonsa (Korean: 심원사; Hanja: 深源寺) is a Buddhist temple of the Jogye Order in Seongju-gun, North Gyeongsan, South Korea.

== History ==
Simwonsa is thought to have been established around the 8th century. A poem written by Yi Sung-in describes it as an ancient temple, so it is thought to have existed long before the Goryeo era.

In 1394, the royal court established an altar at the temple of Sinwonsa to pay homage to the deity of the mountain, which established Gyeryong Mountain as one of three sacred mountains where the royal court paid homage to mountain deities.

One record says the temple was renovated by Ven. Jiwon during the reign of Joseon's King Jungjong (r. 1506-1544), but Simwonsa was reduced to ashes during the Japanese invasion (1592-1597). Beomugo (Temple Directory of Joseon), published in 1799, describes it as abandoned and so it seems likely to have already been in ruins in the 18th century. It was reconstructed in 2003 as part of Seongju County's project, “Restoration Plan of Cultural Tourism Resources in the Region of Mt. Gayasan National Park.”

In preliminary excavation surveys, it was confirmed that Simwonsa had been a typical United Silla era mountain temple. It had three Buddha halls built above four-story terraced retaining walls and its land measured 80 meters (262 feet) north to south and 100 meters (328 feet) east to west. Among the artifacts discovered were a pedestal for a stone Buddha statue, a salutation stone, a nimbus from a Buddha statue, a seated stone Vairocana Buddha statue, and a stone that was part of the base of a stone pagoda. All of these collectively are designated Cultural Heritage Materials of North Gyeongsang Province No. 525.

=== Sinwonsa temple in poetry ===
On Mt. Gayasan is an ancient temple named Simwonsa.

Its gate is never locked, even in the dense forest of pine trees

I long to go there and ask the profound meaning of the Suramgama Sutra,

But, alas, when will I have the time?

- Do-eun, Yi Sung-in (李崇仁; 1347-1392) -

== Cultural properties ==
Although Simwonsa was recently restored after a long period of abandonment, there remained the Three-Story Stone Pagoda (Cultural Heritage Material of North Gyeongsang Province No. 116), and a Woodblock for Choosing Auspicious and Inauspicious Days (Treasure No. 1647). Inscribed at Buseoksa Temple in Yeongju during the reign of Goryeo's King Gojong (r. 1122-1146), this printing woodblock lists special days.

Many temple ruins are scattered around the area: the Beopsusa Temple Ruins (another great temple of the Silla era), Yonggisa Temple Ruins, Iryoam Hermitage Ruins and a temple ruin at Baegun-ri.

== Gallery ==
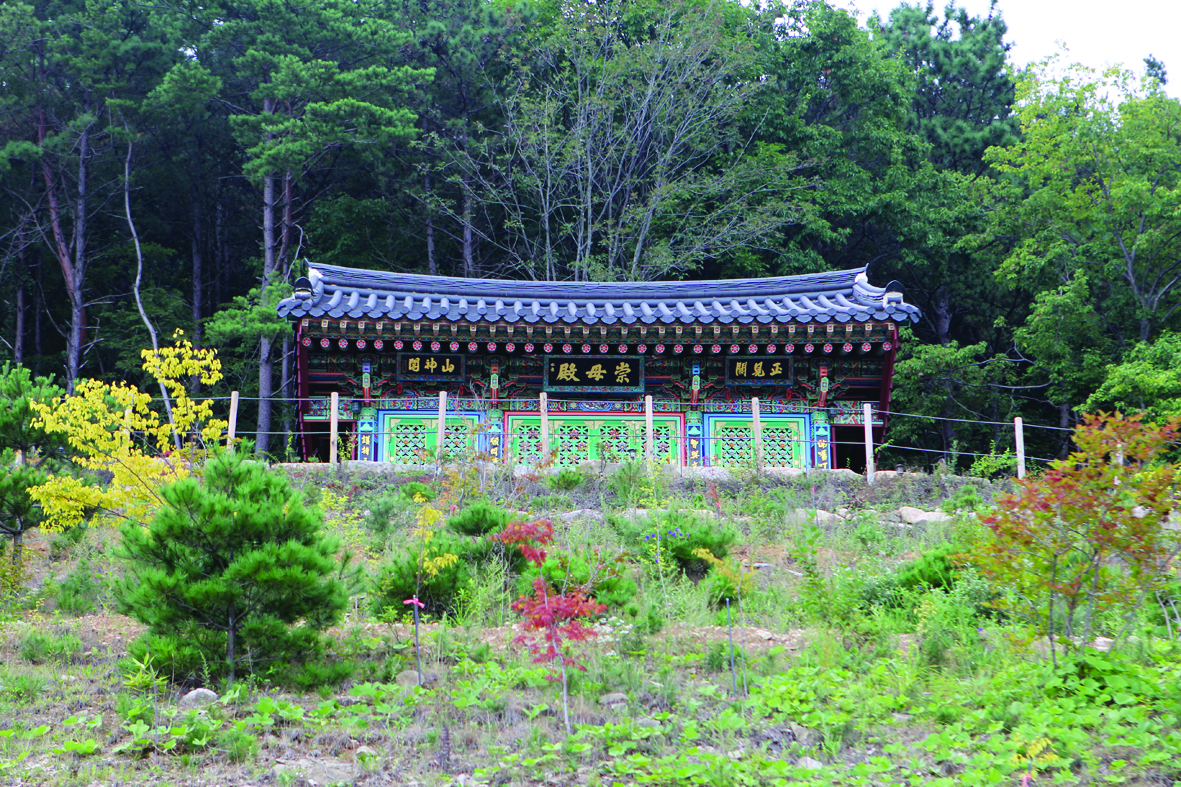

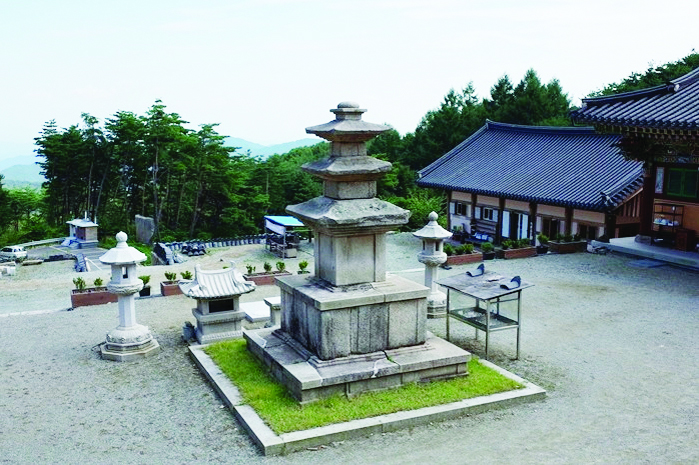

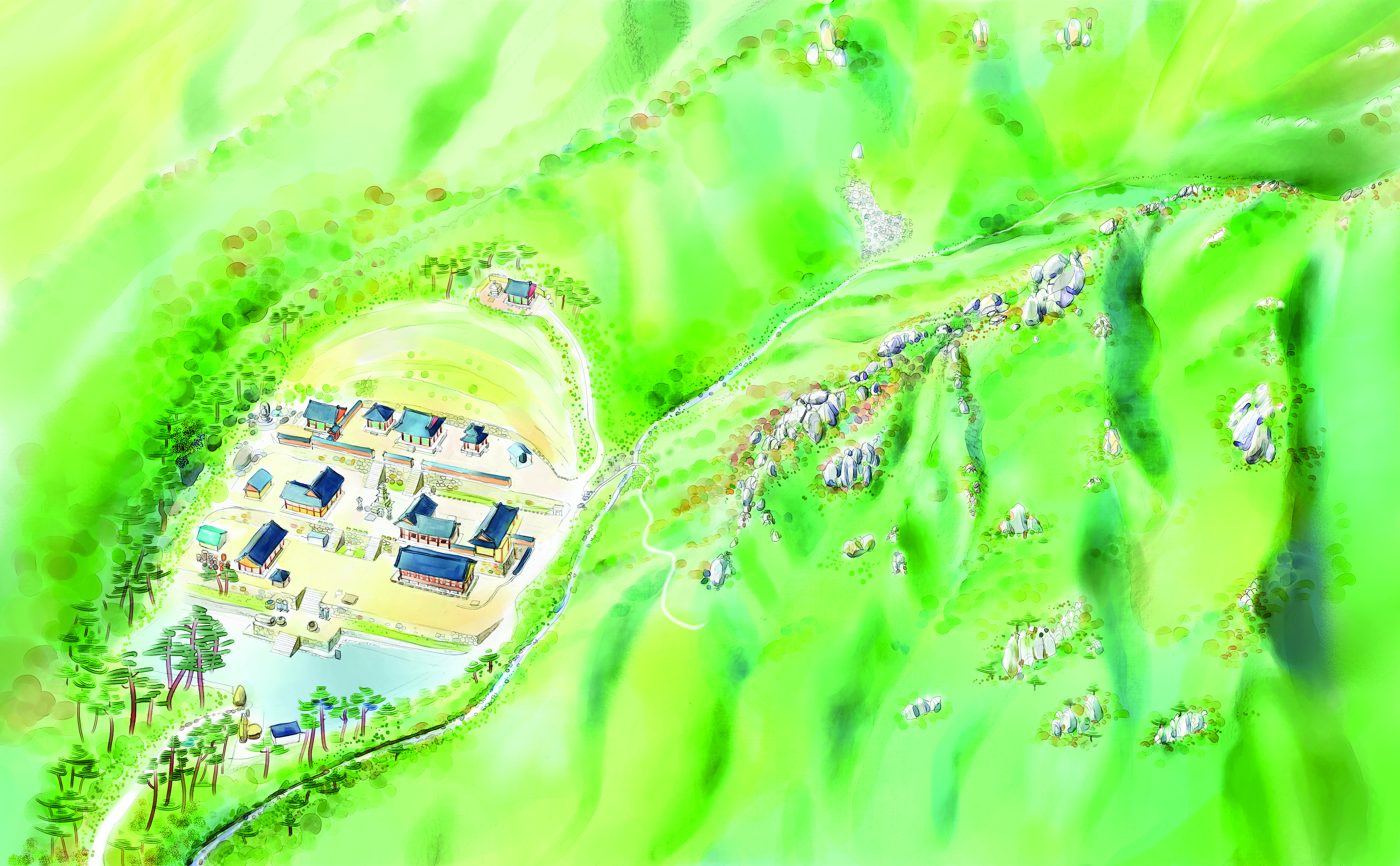

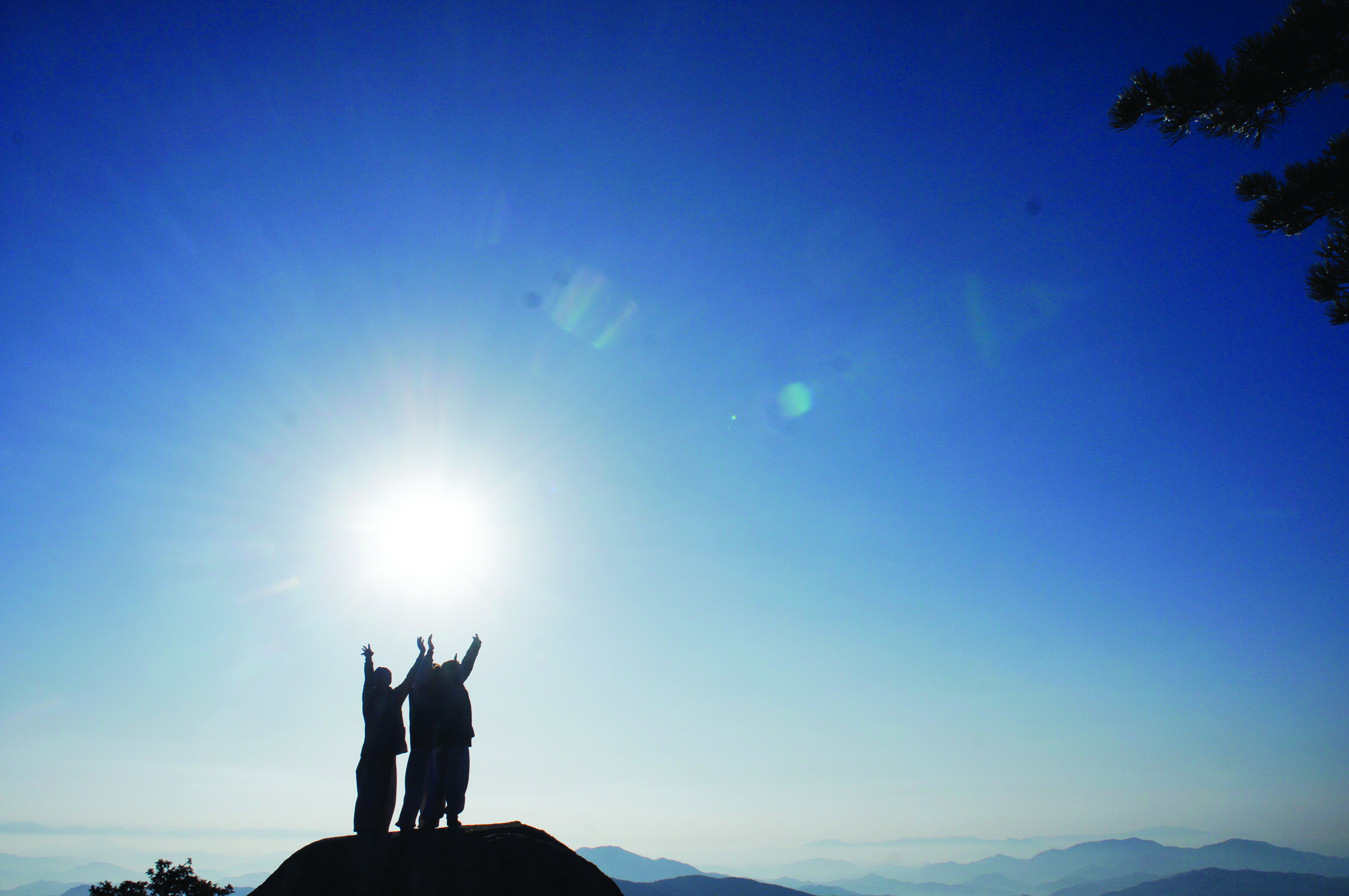
