= Namhung Youth Chemical Complex =

Chemical manufacturing complex in North Korea

- Chosŏn'gŭl: 남흥청년화학련합기업소
- Hancha: 南興靑年化學聯合企業所
- Revised Romanization: Namheung cheongnyeon hwahak ryeonhap gieopso
- McCune–Reischauer: Namhŭng ch'ŏngnyŏn hwahak ryŏnhap kiŏpso

The Namhŭng Youth Chemical Complex is a large industrial complex in Namhŭng-dong, Anju-si, South P'yŏngan province, North Korea, and is one of the most important chemical factories in the country, being a major producer of chemical products such as fertilisers, herbicides, insecticides, various industrial chemicals. various plastics such as polyethylene sheeting, and various synthetic textiles. It is also believed to produce chemical weapons such as cyanogen chloride and mustard gas.

The complex was originally built in 1976 with French, Japanese and West German equipment, initially producing ammonia by naphtha gasification, acrylic and polycarbonate fibres, and urea fertiliser, using naphtha brought in from the Sŭngri and Ponghwa chemical factories. In 2000, new equipment was installed to produce sodium carbonate, and renovations of the complex began in 2006. Also in 2006, the construction of a new anthracite gasification plant began; this was opened in 2010, and its output is being used to produce fertiliser, and by 2011 a second gasification plant was opened.

The facility is served by the Korean State Railway via Namhŭng station on the Namhŭng Line. It also has its own fleet of shunting locomotives, along with facilities for the maintenance of rail equipment.
