= Copyright law of North Korea =

Copyright law of North Korea is regulated by the Copyright Act of 2001. It introduced a 50 years p.m.a. protection, and has been amended several times. North Korea had no copyright law before that date. North Korea has been party to the Berne Convention since 2003. Relevant organizations include the Copyright Office of the Democratic People's Republic of Korea; Intellectual Property Administration of the Democratic People's Republic of Korea; Invention Office of the Democratic People's Republic of Korea; and the Trademark, Industrial Design and Geographical Indication Office (TIDGIO) of the DPR Korea.

== See also ==
- Law of North Korea
