= Unjon County =

Coordinates: 40.1969°N 124.5319°E

Unjŏn County 운전군
- County

Korean transcription(s)
  - Chosŏn'gŭl: 운전군
  - Hancha: 雲田郡
  - McCune-Reischauer: Unjŏn-gun
  - Revised Romanization: Unjeon-gun
- Country: North Korea
- Province: North P'yŏngan
- Administrative divisions: 1 ŭp, 25 ri

Area
  - Total: 383.8 km^{2} (148.2 sq mi)

Population (2008)
  - Total: 101,130
  - Density: 263.5/km^{2} (682.5/sq mi)

Unjŏn County is a kun, or county, in North P'yŏngan province, North Korea. It borders T'aech'ŏn to the north, Pakch'ŏn to the east and southeast, and Chŏngju to the north. To the south, it looks out on the Yellow Sea. Unjŏn county was created in 1952 from portions of Pakch'ŏn county and Chŏngju city, and subsequently reorganized in 1954 and 1958.

== Geography ==
The terrain is relatively gentle, with low mountains in the west and plains to the south and east. The highest of the western peaks is Mogusan (414 m). The chief plain is the Unjŏn Plain (150 km^{2}), which is formed by the 40-kilometer course of the Changp'och'ŏn stream, which flows into the Taeryŏng River. There are several islands offshore, including Unmudo and Hyesŏngdo. Some 40% of the county's land is taken up by forestland.

== Administrative divisions ==
Unjŏn county is divided into 1 ŭp (town) and 25 ri (villages):

- Unjŏn-ŭp (운전읍/雲田邑)
- Ch'ŏngjŏng-ri (청정리/淸亭里)
- Haksal-li (학산리/鶴山里)
- Kasal-li (가산리/嘉山里)
- Kŭmgye-ri (금계리/金溪里)
- Kuryŏl-li (구련리/九蓮里)
- Kwanhae-ri (관해리/觀海里)
- Og'ya-ri (옥야리/玉野里)
- Pongdŏng-ri (봉덕리/鳳德里)
- Posŏl-li (보석리/寶石里)
- Pug'il-li (북일리/北一里)
- Ryongbong-ri (룡봉리/龍鳳里)
- Samgwang-ri (삼광리/三光里)
- Sin'o-ri (신오리/新五里)
- Songhang-ri (송학리/松鶴里)
- Sŏsam-ri (서삼리/西三里)
- Taeo-ri (대오리/大五里)
- Taeyŏl-li (대연리/大淵里)
- Tŏg'am-ri (덕암리/德岩里)
- Tŏg'wŏl-li (덕원리/德元里)
- Tongch'ang-ri (동창리/東倉里)
- Tongsam-ri (동삼리/東三里)
- Unha-ri (운하리/雲何里)
- Unjŏl-li (운전리/雲田里)
- Wŏlhyŏl-li (월현리/月峴里)
- Wŏnsŏ-ri (원서리/院西里)

== Climate ==
The year-round average temperature is 9.1 °C, with a January average of -7.3 °C and an August average of 23.7 °C. The climate is slightly wetter than average for North Korea, with an annual rainfall of 1230 mm.

== Economy ==
40% of Unjŏn's area is cultivated, with extensive rice cultivation as well as maize, soybeans wheat, and barley. In addition, Unjŏn leads the province in fruit production. Its livestock industry is centred on hog farming. Fishing is also carried out, and graphite and mica are mined. There are also various factories. Salted fish and salted soy sauce are produced, and the county is known for its handicrafts and ceramics.

== Transportation ==
The P'yŏngŭi Line of the Korean State Railway, running between Sinŭiju and P'yŏngyang, passes through Unjŏn county.

== See also ==
- Geography of North Korea
- Administrative divisions of North Korea
- North Pyongan
