= Mogusan =

Mountain in South Korea

Highest point
- Elevation: 1,066 m (3,497 ft)

Geography
- Location: South Korea

Korean name
- Hangul: 목우산
- Hanja: 牧牛山
- RR: Mogusan
- MR: Mogusan

Mogusan (Korean: 목우산) is a mountain in Yeongwol County, Gangwon Province, South Korea. It has an elevation of 1,066 m (3,497 ft).

== See also ==
- List of mountains in Korea
