= Mundok County =

Mundŏk County 문덕군
- County

Korean transcription(s)
  - Chosŏn'gŭl: 문덕군
  - Hancha: 文德郡
  - McCune-Reischauer: Mundŏk-kun
  - Revised Romanization: Mundeok-gun
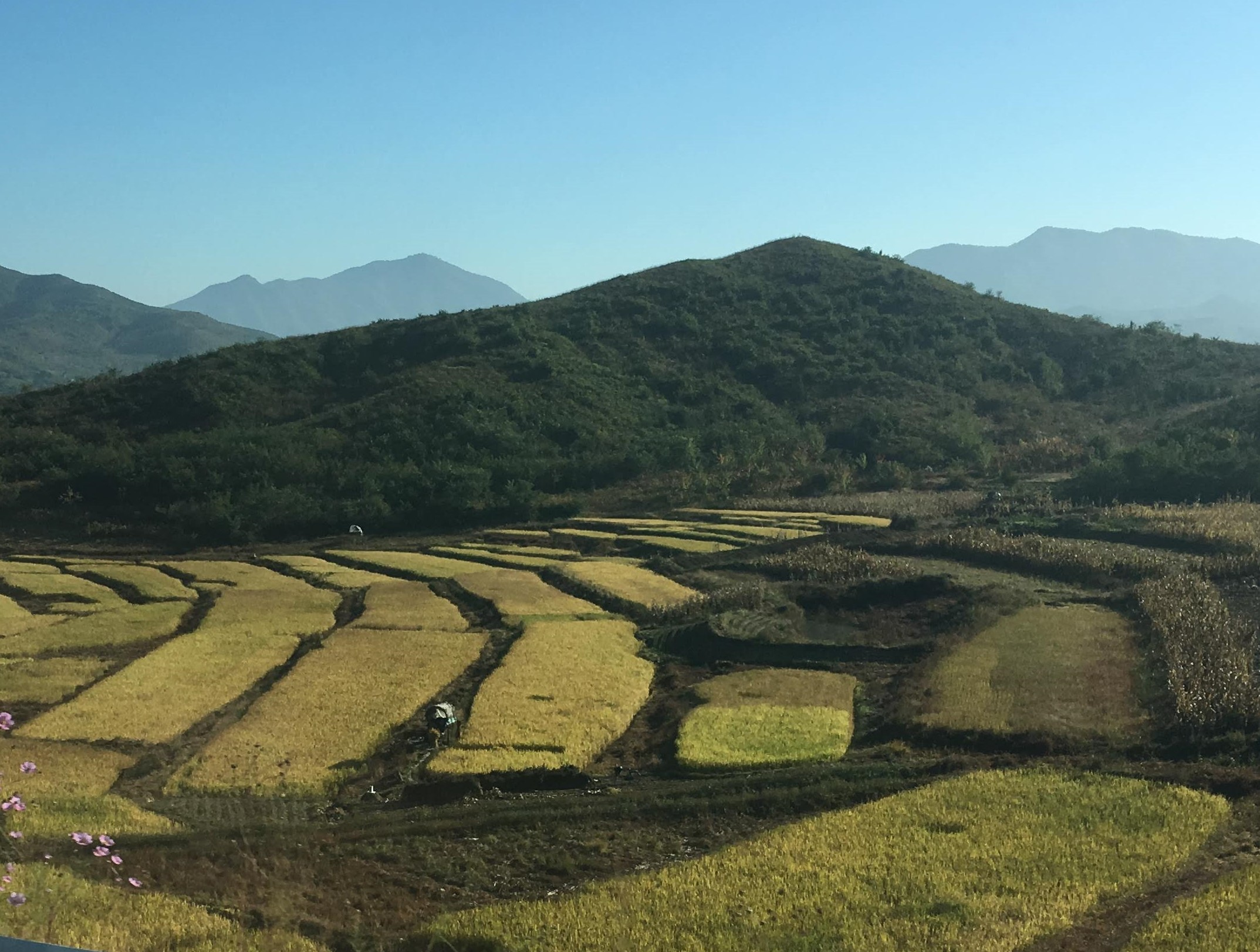
- Fields in South Pyongan.

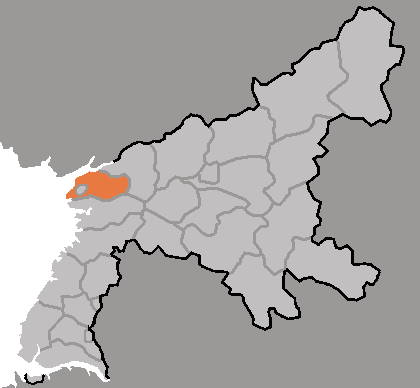
- Map of South Pyongan showing the location of Mundok
- Country: North Korea
- Province: South P'yŏngan
- Administrative divisions: 1 ŭp, 1 workers' district, 21 ri

Area
  - Total: 336 km^{2} (130 sq mi)

Population (2008)
  - Total: 147,191
  - Density: 438/km^{2} (1,130/sq mi)

Mundŏk County is a kun (county) in South P'yŏngan province, North Korea.

== Administrative divisions ==
Mundŏk County is divided into 1 ŭp (town), 1 rodongjagu (workers' districts) and 21 ri (villages):

- Mundŏk-ŭp (문덕읍/文德邑)
- Sŏho-rodongjagu 서호로동자구 (西湖勞動者區)
- Inhŭng-ri (인흥리/仁興里)
- Kŭmgye-ri (금계리/金溪里)
- Masal-li (마산리/馬山里)
- Namhŭng-ri (만흥리/万興里)
- Nam'i-ri (남이리/南二里)
- Namsang-ri (남상계리/南上溪里)
- Ŏryong-ri (어룡리/漁龍里)
- P'ungnyŏl-li (풍년리/豊年里)
- Ripsŏng-ri (립석리/立石里)
- Ryongbung-ri (룡북리/龍北里)
- Ryongdam-ri (룡담리/龍潭里)
- Ryonghŭng-ri (룡흥리/龍興里)
- Ryongjung-ri (룡중리/龍中里)
- Ryongnam-ri (룡남리/龍南里)
- Ryong'o-ri (룡오리/龍五里)
- Ryongpal-li (룡반리/龍盤里)
- Ryongrim-ri (룡림리/龍林里)
- Sangbuktong-ri (상북동리/上北洞里)
- Sangp'al-li (상팔리/上八里)
- Sil-li (신리/新里)
- Sŏngbŏp-ri (성법리/聖法里)
- Tongrim-ri (동림리/東林里)
- Tongsa-ri (동사리/東四里)

== Transportation ==
Mundŏk county is served by the P'yŏngŭi and Sŏhae lines of the Korean State Railway.
