= Pakchon County =

Coordinates: 39.722°N 125.586°E

Pakch'ŏn County 박천군
- County

Korean transcription(s)
  - Chosŏn'gŭl: 박천군
  - Hancha: 博川郡
  - McCune-Reischauer: Pakch'ŏn-gun
  - Revised Romanization: Bakcheon-gun
- Country: North Korea
- Province: North P'yŏngan
- Administrative divisions: 1 ŭp, 1 workers' district, 20 ri

Area
  - Total: 313.6 km^{2} (121.1 sq mi)

Population (2008)
  - Total: 98,128
  - Density: 312.9/km^{2} (810.4/sq mi)

Pakch'ŏn County is a kun, or county, in southern North P'yŏngan province, North Korea. It is bordered to the north by T'aech'ŏn, to the east and southeast by Nyŏngbyŏn, and to the west by Unjŏn counties. To the south, it looks across the Ch'ŏngch'ŏn River at Anju city and Mundŏk county in South P'yŏngan province. In 1952, 4 myŏn of Pakch'ŏn were split off to join Unjŏn county; since then, the county's administrative divisions have been revised in 1954, 1956, 1958, 1978, 1980, and 1982.

== Geography ==
Pakch'ŏn's terrain is dominated by rolling hills and plains, with few points exceeding 300 m above sea level. The highest point is Ch'ŏngryongsan (청룡산, 322 m). The Pakch'ŏn Plain spreads over 100 km² along the Taeryong and Ch'ŏngch'ŏn Rivers. Only 30% of the county's terrain is forested, with pine the dominant tree, while 50% is cultivated.

== Administrative divisions ==
Pakch'ŏn county is divided into 1 ŭp (town), 1 rodongjagu (workers' district) and 20 ri (villages):

- Pakch'ŏn-ŭp (박천읍)
- Maengjung-rodongjagu (맹중로동자구)
- Chungnam-ri (중남리)
- Ch'ŏngryong-ri (청룡리)
- Ch'ŏngsal-li (청산리)
- Hag'am-ri (학암리)
- Kisong-ri (기송리)
- Maengha-ri (맹하리)
- Ponghŭng-ri (봉훙리)
- Pongsŏng-ri (봉성리)
- Ryulgong-ri (률곡리)
- Sambong-ri (삼봉리)
- Samha-ri (삼하리)
- Sangju-ri (상주리)
- Sangyang-ri (상양리)
- Sinp'yŏng-ri (신평리)
- Sŏkkye-ri (석계리)
- Songsŏng-ri (송석리)
- Tansal-li (단산리)
- Tŏksam-ri (덕삼리)
- Taeryŏng-ri (대령리)
- Wŏnnam-ri (원남리)

== Climate ==
The year-round average temperature is 8.8 °C, with temperatures averaging -9.6 °C in January and 23.9 °C in August. The annual rainfall is 1274 mm.

== Economy ==
Pakch'ŏn is a center of rice production; other crops include maize, soybeans, barley, and wheat. Livestock are also raised, and the county leads North Py'ŏngan in the area devoted to orchards. Mineral resources include gold, silver, and mica. In 1991, it was revealed that nuclear facilities are located in Pakch'ŏn.

== Transportation ==
The P'yŏngŭi and Pakch'ŏn lines of the Korean State Railway pass through the county.

== Places of interest ==
The temple of Simwonsa in Sangyang-ri is designated North Korean national treasure 21.

Pakchon is home to Pakchon Technical School (박천전문학교).

== See also ==
- Geography of North Korea
- Administrative divisions of North Korea
- North Pyongan
