= Gyeongwon Line (1911–1945) =

1911–1945 railway line in Korea

Overview
- Native name: 경원선 (京元線)
- Status: Divided (see article)
- Owner: Chosen Government Railway
- Termini: Yongsan; Wonsan

Service
- Type: Heavy rail, Passenger/Freight; Regional rail, Commuter rail

History
- Opened: Stages between 1911 and 1914

Technical
- Line length: 223.7 km (139.0 mi)
- Track gauge: 1,435 mm (4 ft 8 1/2 in) standard gauge
- Electrification: 3000 V DC Catenary (Bokgye–Gosan)

- Gyeongwon Line
- Hangul: 경원선
- Hanja: 京元線
- RR: Gyeongwonseon
- MR: Kyŏngwŏnsŏn

The Gyeongwon Line was a railway line of the Chosen Government Railway in central Korea. It was the first east–west trunk line to be opened, connecting the capital Gyeongseong to the important east coast port of Wonsan. Following the partition of Korea, the line was divided between North and South Korea.

== History ==
One of the earliest construction plans of the Railway Bureau of the Government General of Korea was for an east−west trunk line to connect Keijō to the important port of Wonsan. The first section of this planned line was the 31.3 km (19.4 mi) segment from Yongsan to Uijeongbu, which was opened by the Chosen Government Railway (Sentetsu) on 15 October 1911. Construction westbound from Wonsan began in 1912, and segments of the line were opened at various stages over the subsequent five years, until the final section, 12.2 km (7.6 mi) from Sepo to Gosan, was opened on 16 August 1914, completing the line from Gyeongseong to Wonsan.

The line was built in the following segments:

Date	Section	Length
15 October 1911	Yongsan–Uijeongbu	31.3 km (19.4 mi)
21 July 1912	Uijeongbu–Yeoncheon	42.7 km (26.5 mi)
21 October 1912	Yeoncheon–Cheorwon	24.1 km (15.0 mi)
10 July 1913	Cheorwon–Pokkye	25.6 km (15.9 mi)
21 August 1913	Yongjiwon–Wonsan	49.6 km (30.8 mi)
25 September 1913	Pokkye–Geombullang	15.7 km (9.8 mi)
21 October 1913	Gosan–Ryongjiwon	6.5 km (4.0 mi)
21 June 1914	Geombullang–Sepo	12.2 km (7.6 mi)
16 August 1914	Sepo–Kosan	26.0 km (16.2 mi)

The first railway electrification projects to be undertaken in Korea were implemented along the Gyeongwon Line. The first of these was the privately owned Geumgangsan Electric Railway, which was first opened in 1924 from Cheorwon to Gimhwa, and by 1931 had been extended all the way to Naegeumgang.

Also in the 1930s, Sentetsu, together with the South Manchuria Railway, was developing plans to create an electrified railway all the way from Busan to Xinjing, capital of Manchukuo. The first stage of this plan was the electrification of the Gyeongwon, Gyeonggyeong and Gyeongin lines, and in March 1940, the Imperial Diet budgeted 3.6 million Yen for electrification equipment for this plan. Electrification of the Pokkye−Gosan section of the Gyeongwon Line began in December 1940; it was completed and commissioned on 27 March 1944, and commercial electric operations commenced on 1 April 1944.

After the partition of Korea following the end of the Pacific War in 1945, the Gyeongwon Line was split along the 38th parallel between the stations of Hantangang and Choseongni. The railways in both South and North were nationalised, and the newly established Korean National Railroad took over operation of the truncated Gyeongwon Line, from Seoul to Choseongni; in the North, the Korean State Railway merged its section of the Gyeongwon Line, Choseongni−Wonsan, with the Wonsan−Gowon section of the former Hamgyeong Line to create the Gangwon Line.

The line was severely damaged during the Korean War. After the ceasefire and the subsequent establishment of the Military Demarcation Line, the division of the line changed, with the South gaining control of the line further northwards as far as Woljeongni. However, in the South the line was rebuilt only as far as Sintalli, resulting in an operation line from Yongsan and Sintalli with a length of 88.8 km (55.2 mi).

For the post-war histories of the Northern and Southern sections of the line, see Kangwon Line for the Northern section, and Gyeongwon Line for the Southern section.

== Route ==
Stations as of 1945
Distance		Station name					
Total; km	S2S; km	Transcribed, Korean	Transcribed, Japanese	Hunminjeongeum	Hanja/Kanji	Opening date Original owner	Connections
0.0	0.0	Yongsan	Ryūzan	용산	龍山	15 October 1911	Sentetsu Gyeongbu Line; Sentetsu Yongsan Line
3.6	3.6	Seobinggo	Seihyōko	서빙고	西氷庫	1 October 1917	
7.7	4.1	Sucheolli	Suitetsuri	수천리	水鐵里	15 October 1911	Closed 1944
10.4	2.7	Wangsimni	Ōjūri	왕십리	往十里	15 October 1911	
12.6	2.2	Cheongnyangni	Seiryūri	청량리	淸凉里	15 October 1911	Sentetsu Gyeonggyeong Line
18.2	5.6	Yeonchon	Genson	연촌	硯村	25 July 1939	Gyeongchun Railway Gyeongchun Line
21.8	3.6	Changdong	Sōdō	창동	倉洞	15 October 1911	
31.3	9.5	Uijeongbu	Giseifu	의정부	議政府	15 October 1911	
43.5	12.2	Deokjeong	Tokutei	덕정	德亭	15 October 1911	
53.3	9.8	Dongducheon	Tōtōsen	동두천	東豆川	25 July 1912	
65.4	12.1	Jeongok	Zenkoku	전곡	全谷	25 July 1912	
74.0	8.6	Yeoncheon	Rensen	연천	漣川	25 July 1912	
84.5	10.5	Daegwangni	Daikōri	대광리	大光里	21 October 1912	
88.8	4.3	Sintalli	Shintanri	신탄리	新炭里	10 July 1913	
98.1	9.3	Cheorwon	Tetsugen	철원	鉄原	21 October 1912	Geumgangsan Electric Railway
103.1	5.0	Woljeongni	Gesseiri	월정리	月井里	10 July 1913	
113.1	10.0	Gagok	Kaikoku	가곡	佳谷	10 July 1913	
119.9	6.8	Pyeonggang	Heikō	평강	平康	10 July 1913	
123.7	3.8	Bokgye	Fukukei	복계	福溪	10 July 1913	
134.6	10.9	I'mok	Rimoku	이목	梨木	25 September 1913	
139.4	4.8	Geombullang	Kenfutsurō	검불랑	劍拂浪	25 September 1913	
144.4	5.0	Seongsan	Jōsan	성산	城山	21 June 1914	
151.6	7.2	Sepo	Senho	세포	洗浦	21 June 1914	
159.3	7.7	Sambanghyeop	Sanbōgyō	삼방협	三防峽	16 August 1914	
163.2	3.9	Sambang	Sanbō	삼방	三防	16 August 1914	
177.6	14.4	Gosan	Kōzan	고산	高山	21 October 1913	
184.1	6.5	Yeongjiwon	Ryōchien	용지원	龍池院	21 August 1913	
192.2	8.1	Seokwansa	Shakuōji	석왕사	釋王寺	21 August 1913	
201.6	9.4	Namsan	Nansan	남산	南山	21 August 1913	
208.0	6.4	Anbyeon	Anhen	안변	安邊	21 August 1913	Sentetsu Donghae Bukbu Line
212.9	4.9	Baehwa	Haika	배화	培花	21 August 1913	
219.6	6.7	Galma	Katsuba	갈마	葛麻	21 August 1913	
223.7	4.1	Wonsan	Genzan	원산	元山	21 August 1913	Sentetsu Hamgyeong Line
