= Ryongdam station =

Railway station in North Korea

Ryongdam 룡담

Korean name
- Hangul: 룡담역
- Hanja: 龍潭驛
- Revised Romanization: Ryongdam-yeok
- McCune–Reischauer: Ryongdam-yŏk

General information
- Location: Ryongdam-rodongjagu, Ch'ŏnnae, Kangwŏn; North Korea
- Coordinates: 39.3490°N 127.2358°E
- Owner: Korean State Railway

History
- Opened: 21 July 1916
- Former names: Munch'ŏn 문천 (文川)
- Original company: Chosen Government Railway

Services
Preceding station	Korean State Railway	Following station
Chŏnt'an towards Kowŏn	Kangwŏn Line	Ongp'yŏng towards P'yŏnggang
Ch'ŏnnae Terminus	Ch'ŏnnae Line	Terminus
Location

Ryongdam station is a railway station in Ryongdam-rodongjagu, Ch'ŏnnae county, Kangwŏn province, North Korea, on the Kangwŏn Line of the Korean State Railway. It is also the starting point of the Ch'ŏnnae Line to Ch'ŏnnae.

== History ==
The station, originally called Munch'ŏn station (not to be confused with the current station of the same name, which was originally called Munp'yŏng station), along with the rest of the Okp'yŏng−Kowŏn−Kŭmya section of the former Hamgyeong Line, was opened by the Chosen Government Railway on 21 July 1916.
