= Tonggari station =

Railway station in North Korea

Tonggari 동가리

Korean name
- Hangul: 동가리역
- Hanja: 董家里驛
- Revised Romanization: Donggari-yeok
- McCune–Reischauer: Tonggari-yŏk

General information
- Location: Kŭmch'ŏl-li, Kosan, Kangwŏn; North Korea
- Coordinates: 38.7833°N 127.3843°E
- Owner: Korean State Railway

History
- Opened: 16 August 1914

Services
| Preceding station | Korean State Railway | Following station |
|---|---|---|
| Kosan towards Kowŏn | Kangwŏn Line | Rakch'ŏn towards P'yŏnggang |
Location

Tonggari station (Korean: 동가리역) is a railway station in Kŭmch'ŏl-li, Kosan county, Kangwŏn province, North Korea, on the Kangwŏn Line of the Korean State Railway.

The station, along with the rest of the former Kyŏngwŏn Line, was opened by the Japanese on 16 August 1914.
