= Namsan station (Kangwon Line) =

Railway station in Namsan, North Korea

Namsan 남산

Korean name
- Hangul: 남산역
- Hanja: 南山驛
- Revised Romanization: Namsan-yeok
- McCune–Reischauer: Namsan-yŏk

General information
- Location: Namsal-li, Kosan, Kangwŏn; North Korea
- Coordinates: 39.0188°N 127.4636°E
- Owner: Korean State Railway

History
- Opened: 16 August 1914
- Former names: Chosen Government Railway

Services
Preceding station	Korean State Railway	Following station
Anbyŏn towards Kowŏn	Kangwŏn Line	Kwangmyŏng towards P'yŏnggang
Location

Namsan station is a railway station in Namsal-li, Kosan county, Kangwŏn province, North Korea, on the Kangwŏn Line of the Korean State Railway.

The station, along with the rest of the former Kyŏngwŏn Line, was opened by the Japanese on 16 August 1914.
