= Wonsan station =

Railway station in North Korea

Wŏnsan 원산
- Former Wonsan station, rebuilt in 1975

Korean name
- Hangul: 원산역
- Hanja: 元山驛
- Revised Romanization: Wonsan-yeok
- McCune–Reischauer: Wŏnsan-yŏk

General information
- Location: Yangji-dong, Wŏnsan-si, Kangwŏn; North Korea
- Coordinates: 39°9′44″N 127°24′45″E
- Owner: Korean State Railway
- Platforms: 1
- Tracks: 3

History
- Opened: 16 August 1914
- Original company: Chosen Government Railway

Services
Preceding station	Korean State Railway	Following station
Segil towards Kowŏn	Kangwŏn Line	Kalma towards P'yŏnggang
Location

Wŏnsan station (Korean: 원산역) is a railway station located in Yangji-dong, Wŏnsan city, Kangwŏn province, North Korea. It is on the Kangwŏn Line of the Korean State Railway. Locomotive and freight car maintenance facilities are located here.

== History ==
The first station in Wŏnsan, along with the rest of the former Kyŏngwŏn Line from Seoul to Wŏnsan, was opened by the Chosen Government Railway (Sentetsu) on 16 August 1914, although the section between Wŏnsan and Ryongjiwŏn was completed as early as 21 August 1913. A line from Wŏnsan north to Kowŏn and Kŭmya was built as part of the former Hamgyŏng Line; the Wŏnsan−Kowŏn section was completed in two parts: Wŏnsan−Okp'yŏng on 1 August 1915, and Okp'yŏng−Kowŏn−Kŭmya on 21 July 1916. The Wŏnsan−Kowŏn section is now part of the Kangwŏn Line, while the Kowŏn−Kŭmya section is now part of the P'yŏngra Line.

The original station was a western-style brick structure built in central Wŏnsan. Destroyed during the Korean War, it was replaced by a new station in the Yangji-dong neighbourhood on the outskirts of the city; the new station handles only passenger trains, with the freight destined for the city being handled at Kalma station in the industrial Kalma-dong neighbourhood 4.1 km (2.5 mi) southeast of Wŏnsan station.

The original station was rebuilt in 1975 to house the Wŏnsan Revolutionary Museum, as Kim Il Sung boarded a train here upon his return to Korea after the end of the Second World War. A major attraction of the museum is the steam locomotive Pashini-3 (パシニ3), which has been restored to its original condition, including Sentetsu markings, and a former Sentetsu 3rd class coach.
