= Sambang station =

Railway station in North Korea

Sambang 삼방

Korean name
- Hangul: 삼방역
- Hanja: 三防驛
- Revised Romanization: Sambang-yeok
- McCune–Reischauer: Sambang-yŏk

General information
- Location: Sambang-ri, Sep'o, Kangwŏn; North Korea
- Coordinates: 38.7079°N 127.3644°E
- Owner: Korean State Railway

History
- Opened: 16 August 1914

Services
| Preceding station | Korean State Railway | Following station |
|---|---|---|
| Rakch'ŏn towards Kowŏn | Kangwŏn Line | Sep'o Ch'ŏngnyŏn towards P'yŏnggang |
Location

Sambang station is a railway station in Sambang-ri, Sep'o county, Kangwŏn province, North Korea, on the Kangwŏn Line of the Korean State Railway.

Originally called Sambanghyŏp station (Chosŏn'gŭl: 삼방협역; Hanja: 三防峡駅), the station, along with the rest of the former Kyŏngwŏn Line, was opened by the Japanese on 16 August 1914.
