= Kwangmyong station (Kosan County) =

Railway station in North Korea

Kwangmyŏng 광명

Korean name
- Hangul: 광명역
- Hanja: 光明驛
- Revised Romanization: Gwangmyeong-yeok
- McCune–Reischauer: Kwangmyŏng-yŏk

General information
- Location: Kwangmyŏng-ri, Kosan, Kangwŏn; North Korea
- Coordinates: 38.9788°N 127.4106°E
- Owner: Korean State Railway

History
- Opened: 16 August 1914

Services
Preceding station	Korean State Railway	Following station
Namsan towards Kowŏn	Kangwŏn Line	Ryongjiwŏn towards P'yŏnggang
Location

Kwangmyŏng station (Korean: 광명역) is a railway station in Kwangmyŏng-ri, Kosan county, Kangwŏn province, North Korea, on the Kangwŏn Line of the Korean State Railway.

Originally called Sŏgwangsa station (Korean: 석왕사역; Hanja: 釋王寺驛), the station, along with the rest of the former Kyŏngwŏn Line, was opened by the Japanese on 16 August 1914. It was given its current name after the establishment of the DPRK.
