= Rimok station =

Railway station in North Korea

Ri'mok 리목

Korean name
- Hangul: 리목역
- Hanja: 梨木驛
- Revised Romanization: Rimok-yeok
- McCune–Reischauer: Ri'mok-yŏk

General information
- Location: Ri'mong-ri, Sep'o, Kangwŏn; North Korea
- Coordinates: 38.5247°N 127.2898°E
- Owner: Korean State Railway

History
- Opened: 16 August 1914

Services
Preceding station	Korean State Railway	Following station
Kŏmbullang towards Kowŏn	Kangwŏn Line	Pokkye towards P'yŏnggang
Location

Ri'mok station is a railway station in Ri'mong-ri, Sep'o county, Kangwŏn province, North Korea, on the Kangwŏn Line of the Korean State Railway.

The station, along with the rest of the former Kyŏngwŏn Line, was opened by the Japanese on 16 August 1914.
