= Kombullang station =

Railway station in North Korea

Kŏmbullang 검불랑

Korean name
- Hangul: 검불랑역
- Hanja: 劍拂浪驛
- Revised Romanization: Geombullang-yeok
- McCune–Reischauer: Kŏmbullang-yŏk

General information
- Location: Sep'o, Kangwŏn; North Korea
- Coordinates: 38.5608°N 127.3193°E
- Owner: Korean State Railway

History
- Opened: 16 August 1914

Services
Preceding station	Korean State Railway	Following station
Songsan towards Kowŏn	Kangwŏn Line	Ri'mok towards P'yŏnggang
Location

Kŏmbullang station is a railway station in Sep'o county, Kangwŏn province, North Korea, on the Kangwŏn Line of the Korean State Railway.

The station, along with the rest of the former Kyŏngwŏn Line, was opened by the Chosen Government Railway on 16 August 1914.
