= Rakchon station =

Railway station in North Korea

Rakch'ŏn 락천

Korean name
- Hangul: 락천역
- Hanja: 落川驛
- Revised Romanization: Nakcheon-yeok
- McCune–Reischauer: Rakch'ŏn-yŏk

General information
- Location: Sambang-ri, Sep'o, Kangwŏn; North Korea
- Coordinates: 38.7395°N 127.3736°E
- Owner: Korean State Railway

History
- Opened: 16 August 1914

Services
Preceding station	Korean State Railway	Following station
Tonggari towards Kowŏn	Kangwŏn Line	Sambang towards P'yŏnggang
Location

Rakch'ŏn station (Korean: 락천역) is a railway station in Sambang-ri, Sep'o county, Kangwŏn province, North Korea, on the Kangwŏn Line of the Korean State Railway.

Originally called Sambang station (Chosŏn'gŭl: 삼방역; Hanja: 三防驛), the station, along with the rest of the former Kyŏngwŏn Line, was opened by the Japanese on 16 August 1914.
