= Chontan station =

Railway station in North Korea

Ch'ŏnt'an 전탄

Korean name
- Hangul: 전탄역
- Hanja: 前灘驛
- Revised Romanization: Cheontan-yeok
- McCune–Reischauer: Ch'ŏnt'an-yŏk

General information
- Location: Ch'ŏnt'al-li, Kowŏn, South Hamgyŏng; North Korea
- Coordinates: 39.3837°N 127.2460°E
- Owner: Korean State Railway

History
- Opened: 21 July 1916

Services
Preceding station	Korean State Railway	Following station
Kowŏn Terminus	Kangwŏn Line	Ryongdam towards P'yŏnggang
Location

Ch'ŏnt'an station is a railway station in Ch'ŏnt'al-li, Kowŏn County, South Hamgyŏng province, North Korea, on the Kangwŏn Line of the Korean State Railway. The station, along with the rest of the Okp'yŏng–Kowŏn–Kŭmya section of the former Hamgyong Line, was opened by the Japanese on 21 July 1916.
