= Segil station =

Railway station in North Korea

Segil station 세길

Korean name
- Hangul: 세길역
- Hanja: 세길驛
- Revised Romanization: Segil-yeok
- McCune–Reischauer: Segil-yŏk

General information
- Location: Segil-dong, Wŏnsan-si, Kangwŏn; North Korea
- Coordinates: 39°10′40″N 127°22′49″E
- Owner: Korean State Railway

History
- Opened: 1 August 1915

Services
Preceding station	Korean State Railway	Following station
Munch'ŏn towards Kowŏn	Kangwŏn Line	Wŏnsan towards P'yŏnggang
Terminus	Songdowŏn Line	Songdowŏn towards Tŏgwŏn
Location

Segil station is a railway station in Segil-dong, Wŏnsan Municipal City, Kangwŏn province, North Korea, on Songdowŏn Line of the Korean State Railway. The Songdowŏn Line runs to Wŏnsan, where it connects to the Kangwŏn Line.

Originally called Tŏgwŏn station (Chosŏn'gŭl: 덕원역; Hanja: 德源驛), the station, along with the rest of the Okp'yŏng–Wŏnsan section of the former Hamgyŏng Line, was opened by the Chosen Government Railway on 1 August 1915. Also this station is the starting point of the Songdowŏn Line to Songdowŏn.

The station, which serves a seaside resort in Segil-dong, was opened on 23 September 2014. A ceremony was held to mark the occasion, with a Sŏngun Red Flag-class electric locomotive hauling the inaugural train.
