= Paehwa station =

Railway station in North Korea

Paehwa 배화

Korean name
- Hangul: 배화역
- Hanja: 培花驛
- Revised Romanization: Baehwa-yeok
- McCune–Reischauer: Paehwa-yŏk

General information
- Location: Paehwa-ri, Anbyŏn, Kangwŏn; North Korea
- Coordinates: 39.0883°N 127.4874°E
- Owner: Korean State Railway

History
- Opened: 16 August 1914

Services
Preceding station	Korean State Railway	Following station
Kalma towards Kowŏn	Kangwŏn Line	Anbyŏn towards P'yŏnggang
Location

Paehwa station is a railway station in Paehwa-ri, Anbyŏn county, Kangwŏn province, North Korea, on the Kangwŏn Line of the Korean State Railway.

The station, along with the rest of the former Kyŏngwŏn Line, was opened by the Japanese on 16 August 1914.
