= Chonnae station =

Railway station in North Korea

Ch'ŏnnae 천내

Korean name
- Hangul: 천내역
- Hanja: 川內驛
- Revised Romanization: Cheonnae-yeok
- McCune–Reischauer: Ch'ŏnnae-yŏk

General information
- Location: Ch'ŏnnae-ŭp, Ch'ŏnnae-gun, Kangwŏn; North Korea
- Coordinates: 39.3644°N 127.2130°E
- Owner: Korean State Railway

History
- Opened: 1 November 1927
- Former names: Ch'ŏnnaeri 천내리 (川内里)
- Original company: Chosen Government Railway

Services
Preceding station	Korean State Railway	Following station
Terminus	Ch'ŏnnae Line	Ryongdam Terminus
Location

Ch'ŏnnae station is a railway station in Ch'ŏnnae-ŭp, Ch'ŏnnae county, Kangwŏn Province, North Korea. It is the terminus of the Ch'ŏnnae Line of the Kangwŏn Line of the Korean State Railway, which connects to the Kangwŏn Line at Ryongdam.

== History ==
The station, originally called Ch'ŏnnaeri station, along with the rest of the Ch'ŏnnae Line, was opened by the Chosen Government Railway on 1 November 1927.
