= Ryongjiwon station =

Railway station in North Korea

Ryongjiwŏn 룡지원

Korean name
- Hangul: 룡지원역
- Hanja: 龍池院驛
- Revised Romanization: Ryongjiwon-yeok
- McCune–Reischauer: Ryongjiwŏn-yŏk

General information
- Location: Ryongjiwŏl-li, Kosan, Kangwŏn; North Korea
- Coordinates: 38.9130°N 127.4306°E
- Owner: Korean State Railway

History
- Opened: 16 August 1914 (1st building); 1950s (2nd building); 2017 (3rd building)
- Original company: Chosen Government Railway

Services
Preceding station	Korean State Railway	Following station
Kwangmyŏng towards Kowŏn	Kangwŏn Line	Kosan towards P'yŏnggang
Location

Ryongjiwŏn station is a railway station in Ryongjiwŏl-li, Kosan county, Kangwŏn province, North Korea, on the Kangwŏn Line of the Korean State Railway.

The station, along with the rest of the former Kyŏngwŏn Line, was opened by the Japanese on 16 August 1914. A new station building was opened in 2017 to replace the one built in the 1950s.
