= Songsan station (Kangwon Line) =

Railway station in North Korea

Sŏngsan 성산

Korean name
- Hangul: 성산역
- Hanja: 城山驛
- Revised Romanization: Seongsan-yeok
- McCune–Reischauer: Sŏngsan-yŏk

General information
- Location: Sŏngsal-li, Sep'o, Kangwŏn; North Korea
- Coordinates: 38.5891°N 127.3267°E
- Owner: Korean State Railway

History
- Opened: 16 August 1914

Services
Preceding station	Korean State Railway	Following station
Sep'o Ch'ŏngnyŏn towards Kowŏn	Kangwŏn Line	Kŏmbullang towards P'yŏnggang
Location

Sŏngsan station is a railway station in Sŏngsal-li, Sep'o county, Kangwŏn province, North Korea, on the Kangwŏn Line of the Korean State Railway.

The station, along with the rest of the former Kyŏngwŏn Line, was opened by the Japanese on 16 August 1914.
