= Kalma station =

Railway station in North Korea

Kalma 갈마
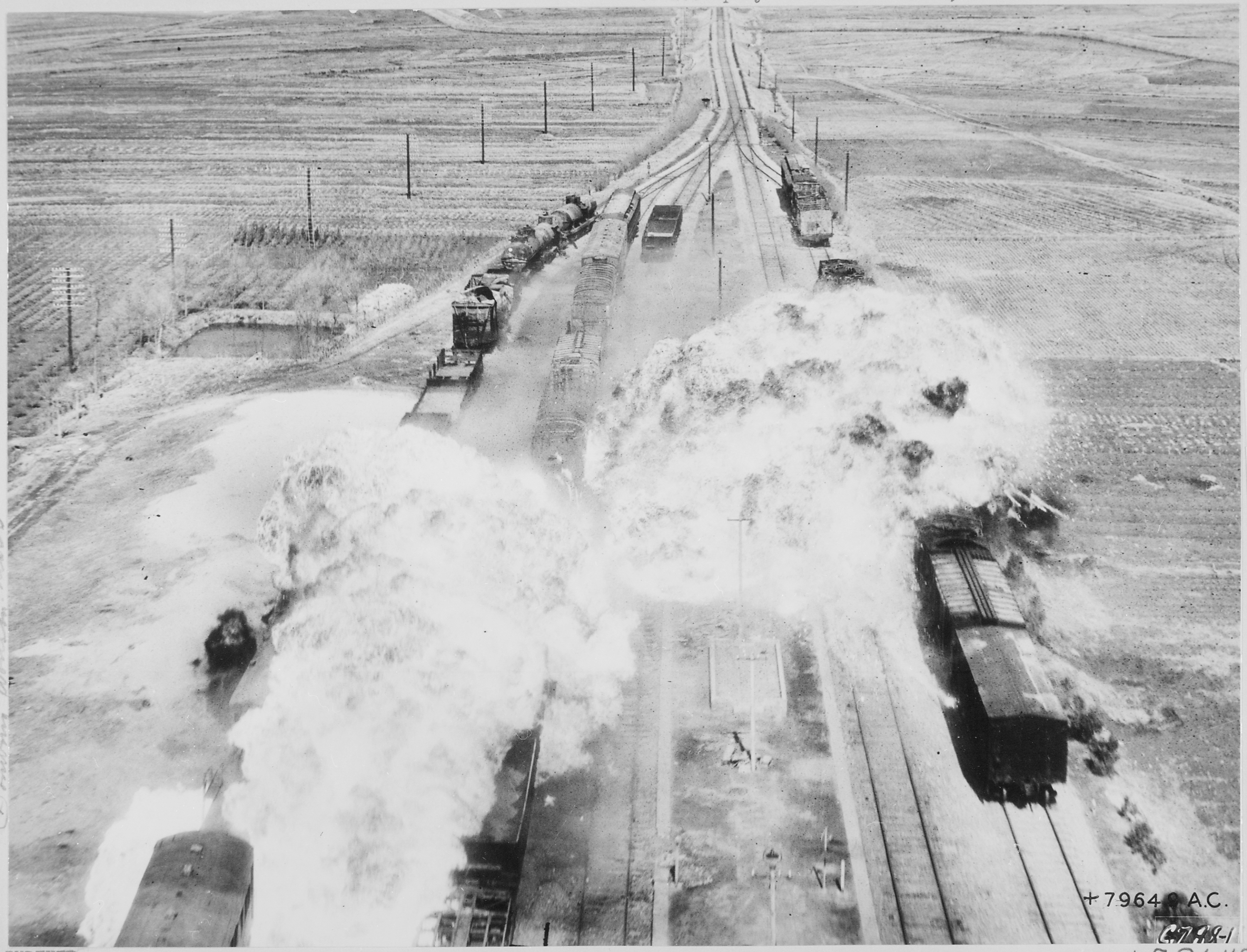
- Kalma station during Korean War

Korean name
- Hangul: 갈마역
- Hanja: 葛麻驛
- Revised Romanization: Galma-yeok
- McCune–Reischauer: Kalma-yŏk

General information
- Location: Kalma-dong, Wŏnsan-si, Kangwŏn; North Korea
- Coordinates: 39.1434°N 127.4670°E
- Owner: Korean State Railway
- Platforms: 3 (1 island)
- Tracks: 9 through, 3 + 6 stub

History
- Opened: 16 August 1914
- Original company: Chosen Government Railway

Services
Preceding station	Korean State Railway	Following station
Wŏnsan towards Kowŏn	Kangwŏn Line	Paehwa towards P'yŏnggang
Terminus	Wŏnsan Port Line	Wŏnsanhang Terminus
Location

Kalma station (Korean: 갈마역) is a railway station in Kalma-dong, an industrial neighbourhood in the eastern part of Wŏnsan city, Kangwŏn province, North Korea, on the Kangwŏn Line of the Korean State Railway. It is also the start of the Wŏnsanhang Line to Wŏnsan Port.

Kalma station handles freight traffic destined for and shipped from Wŏnsan city, and serves several large industries, including the 4 June Rolling Stock Works, which is one of the DPRK's largest railway equipment factories.

The station, along with the rest of the former Kyŏngwŏn Line, was opened by the Chosen Government Railway on 16 August 1914.
