= Sepo Chongnyon station =

Railway station in Kangwŏn, North Korea

Sep'o Ch'ŏngnyŏn 세포청년

Korean name
- Hangul: 세포청년역
- Hanja: 洗浦青年驛
- Revised Romanization: Sepocheongnyeon-yeok
- McCune–Reischauer: Sep'och'ŏngnyŏn-yŏk

General information
- Location: Sep'o-ŭp, Sep'o, Kangwŏn; North Korea
- Coordinates: 38°38′36″N 127°21′22″E
- Owner: Korean State Railway

History
- Opened: 16 August 1914

Services
Preceding station	Korean State Railway	Following station
Sambang towards Kowŏn	Kangwŏn Line	Songsan towards P'yŏnggang
Sinsaeng towards Py'ŏngsan	Ch'ŏngnyŏn Ich'ŏn Line	Terminus
Location

Sep'o Ch'ŏngnyŏn station is a railway station in Sep'o-ŭp, Sep'o county, Kangwŏn province, North Korea; it is the junction point of the Kangwŏn and Ch'ŏngnyŏn Ich'ŏn lines of the Korean State Railway.

Originally called Sep'o station (Chosŏn'gŭl: 세포역; Hanja: 洗浦駅), the station, along with the rest of the former Kyŏngwŏn Line, was opened by the Chosen Government Railway on 16 August 1914., it received its current name after the establishment of the DPRK.
