= 고산 =

고산 may refer to:

- Gosan, the art name of Korean politician Yun Sŏndo
- Ko San (born 1976), CEO and founder of TIDE Institute and ATEAM Ventures
- Kosan County (고산군), county in Kangwŏn province, North Korea

== See also ==
- Gosan
- Kosan (disambiguation)
- 고산역 (disambiguation)
