= Chongnyon Ichon Line =

Railway line in North Korea

Ch'ŏngnyŏn Ich'ŏn Line

Overview
- Native name: 청년이천선 (靑年伊川線)
- Status: Operational
- Owner: Korean State Railway
- Locale: North Hwanghae; Kangwŏn
- Termini: P'yŏngsan; Sep'o Ch'ŏngnyŏn
- Stations: 18

Service
- Type: Heavy rail, Regional rail passenger/freight

History
- Opened: 1962−1972

Technical
- Line length: 141.3 km (87.8 mi)
- Number of tracks: Single track
- Track gauge: 1,435 mm (4 ft 8 1/2 in)
- Electrification: 3000 V DC Catenary
Route map
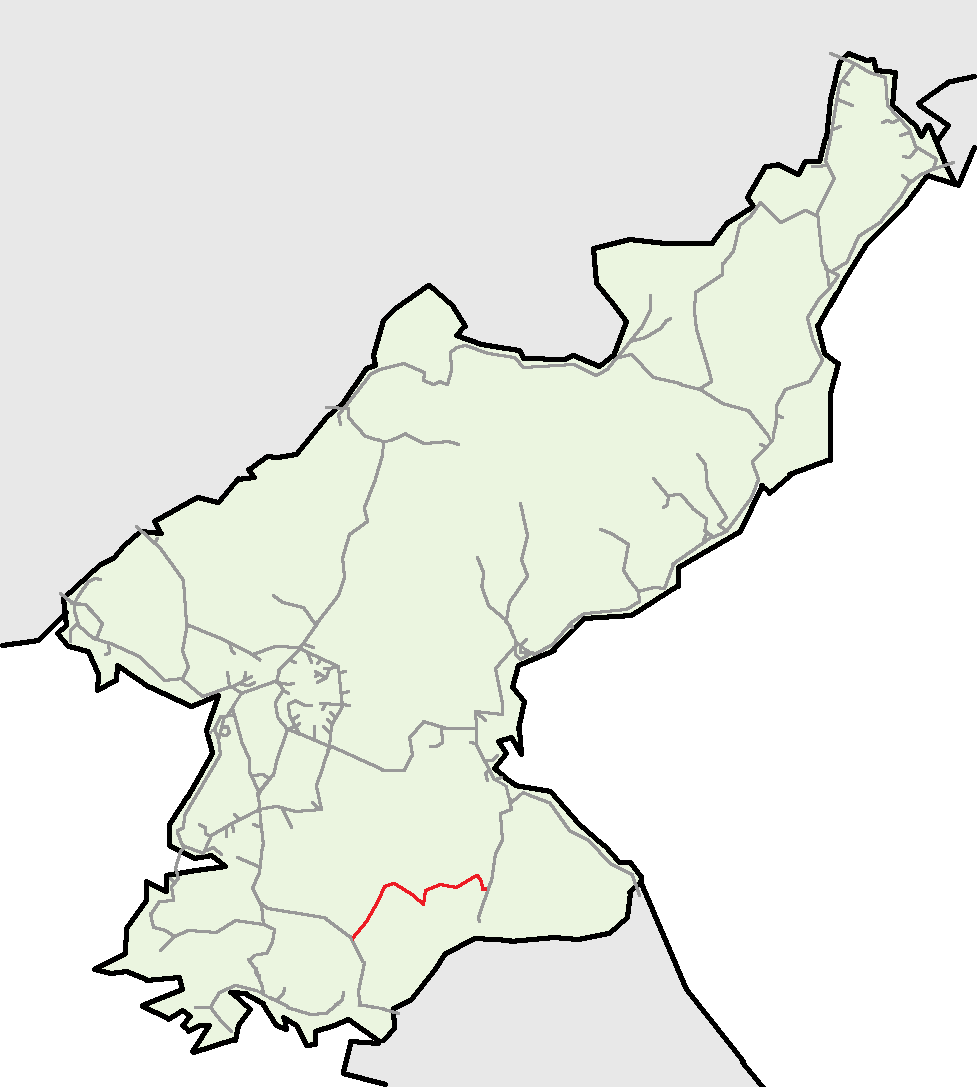

- Chongnyon Ichon Line
- Chosŏn'gŭl: 청년이천선
- Hancha: 靑年伊川線
- Revised Romanization: Cheongnyeon Icheon-seon
- McCune–Reischauer: Ch'ŏngnyŏn Ich'ŏn-sŏn

The Ch'ŏngnyŏn Ich'ŏn Line is an electrified standard-gauge secondary mainline of the Korean State Railway running from P'yŏngsan on the P'yŏngbu Line to Sep'o on the Kangwŏn Line. The 141.3 km (87.8 mi) line is the southernmost of the three east-west transversal mainlines in North Korea.

The Ch'ŏngnyŏn Ich'ŏn line plays an important role in the movement of freight between the east and west coasts of the DPRK, relieving the burden on the P'yŏngra Line. As of 1985, the Sep'o Ch'ŏngnyŏn−Chihari section is under the jurisdiction of the Hamhŭng Railway Bureau, whilst the Chŏngbong−P'yŏngsan section is administered by the Sariwŏn Railway Bureau.

There are 18 stations, of which 3 are halts. Ich'ŏn Ch'ŏngnyŏn and Chŏngbong stations are designated freight concentration points, where goods to and from counties in the area without rail service are transferred between road and rail. Ich'ŏn Ch'ŏngnyŏn Station handles passenger and freight for Ich'ŏn, Ch'ŏrwŏn, P'an'gyo, and Pŏptong counties, while Chŏngbong Station handles them for Kosan, Sinp'yŏng, Singye and Suan counties.

== History ==
As freight movements between the east and west coasts of the DPRK grew in the years after the end of the Korean War, congestion on the P'yŏngra Line became a major issue. To relieve this, the Korean State Railway undertook the construction of a third, more southern transversal line through the mountainous south-central region of the DPRK. Work began in 1957, and the first section to be completed was the 51.4 km (31.9 mi) section from P'yŏngsan to Chihari, which was opened to traffic in 1962, whilst the rest of the route, 89.9 km (55.9 mi) from Chihari to Sep'o Ch'ŏngnyŏn, was opened in October 1972.

Electrification of the line was completed in 1980.

== Services ==
Both passenger and freight trains operate on the Ch'ŏngnyŏn Ich'ŏn Line, with freight being considerably more significant.

=== Freight ===
In order to reduce congestion on the P'yŏngra Line, much transit freight is routed via the Ch'ŏngnyŏn Ich'ŏn Line. Steel products from the Hwanghae Iron & Steel Complex in Songrim on the Songrim Line and cement from the February 8 Cement Complex in West Pongsan on the P'yŏngbu Line make up a major portion of eastbound through traffic.

Westbound traffic is 1.6 to 1.9 times greater than eastbound. Westbound, the primary commodities shipped are ore (18.4−18.6%), wood (16.3%), fertiliser (12−13.1%), and marine products (7.3−7.5%); these four commodities make up roughly 56% of westbound cargo. Over half - 50−60% - of eastbound cargo is grain; ores (8.6−11.2%), metals (9.9−10.7%), and cement (3.2−3.7%) accounts for much of the rest. Grain from the rich granary of Hwanghae is shipped east exclusively along this line, whilst the westbound ore is primarily magnetite from the Tŏksŏng and Musan Mining Complexes destined for the Hwanghae Iron & Steel Complex on the Songrim Line. There is also a uranium concentrate plant at P'yŏngsan.

=== Passenger ===
In the 2002 passenger timetable there is a single daily long-distance train shown as operating on this line, between Haeju and Hyesan. Train 104•107 from Haeju comes to the line via Sariwŏn, departing P'yŏngsan at 0:54 and Sep'o at 6:06 AM, continuing on to Hyesan via Wŏnsan, Hamhŭng and Kilju. The return trip from Hyesan, train 108•111, departs Sep'o at 4:41 AM and P'yŏngsan at 9:47 AM, continuing on to Haeju via Sariwŏn. A commuter service is operated between P'yŏngsan and Chihari.

== Route ==
A yellow background in the "Distance" box indicates that section of the line is not electrified.

| Distance (km) | | Station Name | | Former Name | | |
| Total | S2S | Transcribed | Chosŏn'gŭl (Hanja) | Transcribed | Chosŏn'gŭl (Hanja) | Connections |
|---|---|---|---|---|---|---|
| 0.0 | 0.0 | P'yŏngsan | 평산 (平山) | Namch'ŏn | 남천 (南川) | P'yŏngbu Line |
| 13.2 | 13.2 | Kit'an | 기탄 (岐灘) | | | |
| 19.7 | 6.5 | Ch'imgyo | 침교 (砧橋) | | | |
| 27.8 | 8.1 | Sin'gye | 신계 (新溪) | | | |
| 41.0 | 13.2 | Chŏngbong | 정봉 (丁峰) | | | |
| 51.4 | 10.4 | Chihari | 지하리 (支下里) | | | |
| 57.3 | 5.9 | Chisang | 지상 (支上) | | | |
| 69.1 | 11.8 | Songjŏng | 송정 (松亭) | | | |
| 74.0 | 4.9 | Ich'ŏn Ch'ŏngnyŏn | 이천청년 (伊川靑年) | | | |
| ~~79.6~~ | ~~5.6~~ | Haan | 하안 (河岸) | | | Closed |
| 86.2 | 6.6 | Mundŏng Ch'ŏngnyŏn | 문동청년 (文童靑年) | | | |
| 96.0 | 9.8 | P'an'gyo | 판교 (板橋) | | | |
| 105.0 | 9.0 | Kisan Ch'ŏngnyŏn | 기산청년 (箕山靑年) | | | |
| 111.0 | 6.0 | Hup'yŏng Ch'ŏngnyŏn | 후평청년 (後坪靑年) | | | |
| 118.9 | 7.9 | Sŏha | 서하 (西下) | | | |
| 125.9 | 7.0 | Yaksu | 약수 (藥水) | | | |
| 131.1 | 5.2 | Paeksan Ch'ŏngnyŏn | 백산청년 (白山靑年) | | | |
| 135.4 | 4.3 | Sinsaeng | 신생 (新生) | | | |
| 136.6 | 1.2 | Saemaŭl | 새마을 (-) | | | |
| 141.3 | 4.7 | Sep'o Ch'ŏngnyŏn | 세포청년 (洗浦靑年) | Sep'o | 세포 (洗浦) | Kangwŏn Line |
