= Ichon =

Ichon may refer to:

- Ichon County, a county in Kangwon province, North Korea
  - Ichon Chongnyon Station, the railway station for Ichon, North Korea
- Ichon-dong, a dong of Yongsan-gu, Seoul, South Korea
  - Ichon Station, a transfer point on the Seoul Metro
- Ichon, a barangay in Macrohon, Southern Leyte, Philippines

== See also ==
- Icheon, a city in Gyeonggi province, South Korea
