= Pokkye station =

Railway station in North Korea

Pokkye 복계

Korean name
- Hangul: 복계역
- Hanja: 福渓驛
- Revised Romanization: Bokgye-yeok
- McCune–Reischauer: Pokkye-yŏk

General information
- Location: Pokkye-ri, P'yŏnggang, Kangwŏn; North Korea
- Coordinates: 38.4385°N 127.2637°E
- Owner: Korean State Railway

History
- Opened: 16 August 1914

Services
Preceding station	Korean State Railway	Following station
Ri'mok towards Kowŏn	Kangwŏn Line	P'yŏnggang Terminus
Location

Pokkye station is a railway station in Pokkye-ri, P'yŏnggang county, Kangwŏn province, North Korea, on the Kangwŏn Line of the Korean State Railway.

The station, along with the rest of the former Kyŏngwŏn Line, was opened by the Japanese on 16 August 1914.
