= Kosan station =

Railway station in North Korea

Kosan 고산

Korean name
- Hangul: 고산역
- Hanja: 高山驛
- Revised Romanization: Gosan-yeok
- McCune–Reischauer: Kosan-yŏk

General information
- Location: Kosan-ŭp, Kosan, Kangwŏn; North Korea
- Coordinates: 38.8579°N 127.4268°E
- Owner: Korean State Railway

History
- Opened: 16 August 1914

Services
Preceding station	Korean State Railway	Following station
Ryongjiwŏn towards Kowŏn	Kangwŏn Line	Tonggari towards P'yŏnggang
Location

Kosan station (Korean: 고산역) is a railway station in Kosan-ŭp, Kosan county, Kangwŏn province, North Korea, on the Kangwŏn Line of the Korean State Railway.

The station, along with the rest of the former Kyŏngwŏn Line, was opened by the Chosen Government Railway on 16 August 1914.
