= Songsan station (disambiguation) =

Songsan station is a station of the U Line in Uijeongbu, Gyeonggi, South Korea.

Songsan station may also refer to:

- Songsan Station (Kangwon Line) (성산역), a railway station in Sŏngsal-li, Sep'o, Kangwŏn, North Korea
- Songsan Station (Pongsan) (송산역), a station of the Hwanghae Ch'ŏngnyŏn Line in North Hwanghae, North Korea

== See also ==
- Seongsan Station (disambiguation)
