= Chonnae Line =

Railway line in North Korea

Ch'ŏnnae Line

Overview
- Other name: Ch'ŏnnaeri Line (천내리선)
- Native name: 천내선 (川內線)
- Status: Operational
- Owner: Chosen Government Railway (1927–1945); Korean State Railway (since 1945)
- Locale: Kangwŏn
- Termini: Ryongdam; Ch'ŏnnae
- Stations: 2

Service
- Type: Heavy rail, Freight rail Regional rail

History
- Opened: 1 November 1927

Technical
- Line length: 4.4 km (2.7 mi)
- Number of tracks: Single track
- Track gauge: 1,435 mm (4 ft 8 1/2 in) standard gauge
- Electrification: 3000 V DC overhead line

- Chonnae Line
- Hangul: 천내선
- Hanja: 川內線
- RR: Cheonnaeseon
- MR: Ch'ŏnnaesŏn

The Ch'ŏnnae Line is an electrified 4.4 km (2.7 mi) long railway line of the Korean State Railway in Kangwŏn Province, North Korea, connecting Ryongdam on the Kangwŏn Line with Ch'ŏnnae.

== History ==
Originally called the Ch'ŏnnaeri Line, it was opened on 1 November 1927 by the Chosen Government Railway to transport cement from the Ch'ŏnnae Cement Factory at Ch'ŏnnae Station (at the time called Ch'ŏnnaeri Station) to Ryongdam Station on the Hamgyŏng Line, and it was later extended to a colliery.

Following the partition of Korea, the entirety of the Ch'ŏnnae Line was located in the Soviet zone of occupation. The Provisional People’s Committee for North Korea nationalised all railways in the northern half of the country, including the Ch'ŏnnae Line, on 10 August 1946, and following the establishment of North Korea, the Korean State Railway was created. When Ch'ŏnnaeri Station was renamed Ch'ŏnnae Station, the line received its present name. Electrification of the line was completed in September 1980.

== Route ==
A yellow background in the "Distance" box indicates that section of the line is not electrified.

Distance (km)		Station Name		Former Name		
Total	S2S	Transcribed	Chosŏn'gŭl (Hanja)	Transcribed	Chosŏn'gŭl (Hanja)	Connections
0.0	0.0	Ryongdam	룡담 (龍潭)			Kangwŏn Line
4.4	4.4	Ch'ŏnnae	천내 (川內)	Ch'ŏnnaeri	천내리 (川內里)	
