= Anhyop County =

Anhyop County (安峽郡) was a county in Gangwon Province, Korea. In 1914, it was annexed to Ichon County. In 1952, most of former Anhyop County was annexed to Chorwon County of North Korea.
