= Wonsanhang station =

Railway station in North Korea

Wŏnsanhang 원산항

Korean name
- Hangul: 원산항역
- Hanja: 元山港駅
- Revised Romanization: Wonsanhang-yeok
- McCune–Reischauer: Wŏnsanhang-yŏk

General information
- Location: Wŏnsan-si, Kangwŏn; North Korea
- Owner: Korean State Railway

History
- Original company: Chosen Government Railway

Services
Preceding station	Korean State Railway	Following station
Kalma Terminus	Wŏnsan Port Line	Terminus
Location

Wŏnsanhang station (Wŏnsan Port station) is a freight-only railway station serving the port of Wŏnsan city, Kangwŏn province, North Korea, on the terminus of the Wŏnsan Port Line Line of the Korean State Railway.

In addition to the port's bulk cargo terminal, this line also serves the Wŏnsan Chemical Factory.
