= Songdowon station =

Railway station in North Korea

Songdongwŏn 송도원

Korean name
- Hangul: 송도원역
- Hanja: 松濤園驛
- Revised Romanization: Songdongwon-yeok
- McCune–Reischauer: Songdongwŏn-yŏk

General information
- Location: Wŏnsan-si, Kangwŏn; North Korea
- Coordinates: 39.179064°N 127.403923°E
- Owner: Korean State Railway

Services
Preceding station	Korean State Railway	Following station
Segil Terminus	Songdowŏn Line	Terminus
Location

Songdongwŏn station is a railway station in greater Wŏnsan city, Kangwŏn province, North Korea, on the Songdongwŏn Line of the Korean State Railway.

The station serves the Songdowon International Children's Camp.
