= 고산역 =

고산역 may refer to stations:

- Gosan Station (孤山驛), station of the Daejeon Metro
- Kosan station (高山驛), railway station in Kosan-ŭp, Kosan county, Kangwŏn province, North Korea
