= Seongsan station =

Seongsan station may refer to:

- Suncheon station, or Seongsan station, a station of the railway Jeolla Line
- Songsan station (Kangwon Line)
- World Cup Stadium station (Seoul)
- Namchuncheon station
- Digital Media City station
