= Kosan =

Kosan may be:

- Kosan County, a county in Kangwon Province, North Korea
- Kosan Biosciences, American pharmaceuticals company
- Ube Kosan Open, golf tournament played at the Ube 72 Country Club, Yamaguchi, Japan
- Kosan, art name of Joseon politician Yun Sŏndo

People with the surname Kosan include:

- Anja Kosan (born 2002), German rhythmic gymnast
- Ismail Kosan (born 1948), German Politician

== See also ==
- Ko San, South Korean cosmonaut
