= Ichon Chongnyon station =

Railway station in North Korea

Ichon Chongnyon station is a railway station for Ichon County, Kangwon Province, North Korea.
