= Wonsanhang Line =

Railway line in North Korea

Wŏnsan Port Line

Overview
- Native name: 원산항선 (元山港線)
- Status: Operational
- Owner: Korean State Railway
- Locale: Wŏnsan-si
- Termini: Kalma; Wŏnsanhang
- Stations: 2

Service
- Type: Heavy rail, Freight rail

Technical
- Line length: 2.0 km (1.2 mi)
- Number of tracks: Single track
- Track gauge: 1,435 mm (4 ft 8 1/2 in) standard gauge

- Wonsanhang Line
- Hangul: 원산항선
- Hanja: 元山港線
- RR: Wonsanhangseon
- MR: Wŏnsanhangsŏn

The Wŏnsanhang Line, or Wŏnsan Port Line, is a non-electrified freight-only secondary railway line of the Korean State Railway in Wonsan Municipal City, North Korea, running from Kalma to Wŏnsan Port.

== Route ==
A yellow background in the "Distance" box indicates that section of the line is not electrified.

Distance (km)		Station Name		Former Name		
Total	S2S	Transcribed	Chosŏn'gŭl (Hanja)	Transcribed	Chosŏn'gŭl (Hanja)	Connections
0.0	0.0	Kalma	갈마 (葛麻)			Kangwŏn Line
2.0	2.0	Wŏnsanhang	원산항 (元山港)			
