= Kumya Line =

Railway line in North Korea

Kŭmya Line

Overview
- Native name: 금야선 (金野線)
- Status: Operational
- Owner: Korean State Railway
- Locale: South P'yŏngan
- Termini: Kŭmya; P'ungnam
- Stations: 2

Service
- Type: Heavy rail, Freight rail

History
- Opened: 1970s

Technical
- Line length: 8.7 km (5.4 mi)
- Number of tracks: Single track
- Track gauge: 1,435 mm (4 ft 8 1/2 in) standard gauge
- Electrification: 3000 V DC Catenary

- Kumya Line
- Hangul: 금야선
- Hanja: 金野線
- RR: Geumyaseon
- MR: Kŭmyasŏn

The Kŭmya Line is an electrified standard-gauge secondary line of the Korean State Railway in South P'yŏngan Province, North Korea, running from Kŭmya on the P'yŏngra Line to P'ungnam.

== History ==
This line was opened by the Korean State Railway in the 1970s.

== Route ==
A yellow background in the "Distance" box indicates that section of the line is not electrified.

Distance (km)		Station Name		Former Name		
Total	S2S	Transcribed	Chosŏn'gŭl (Hanja)	Transcribed	Chosŏn'gŭl (Hanja)	Connections
0.0	0.0	Kŭmya	금야 (金野)	Yŏnghŭng	영흥 (永興)	P'yŏngra Line
8.7	8.7	P'ungnam	풍남 (豊南)			
