= Songdowon Line =

Railway line in North Korea

Songdowŏn Line
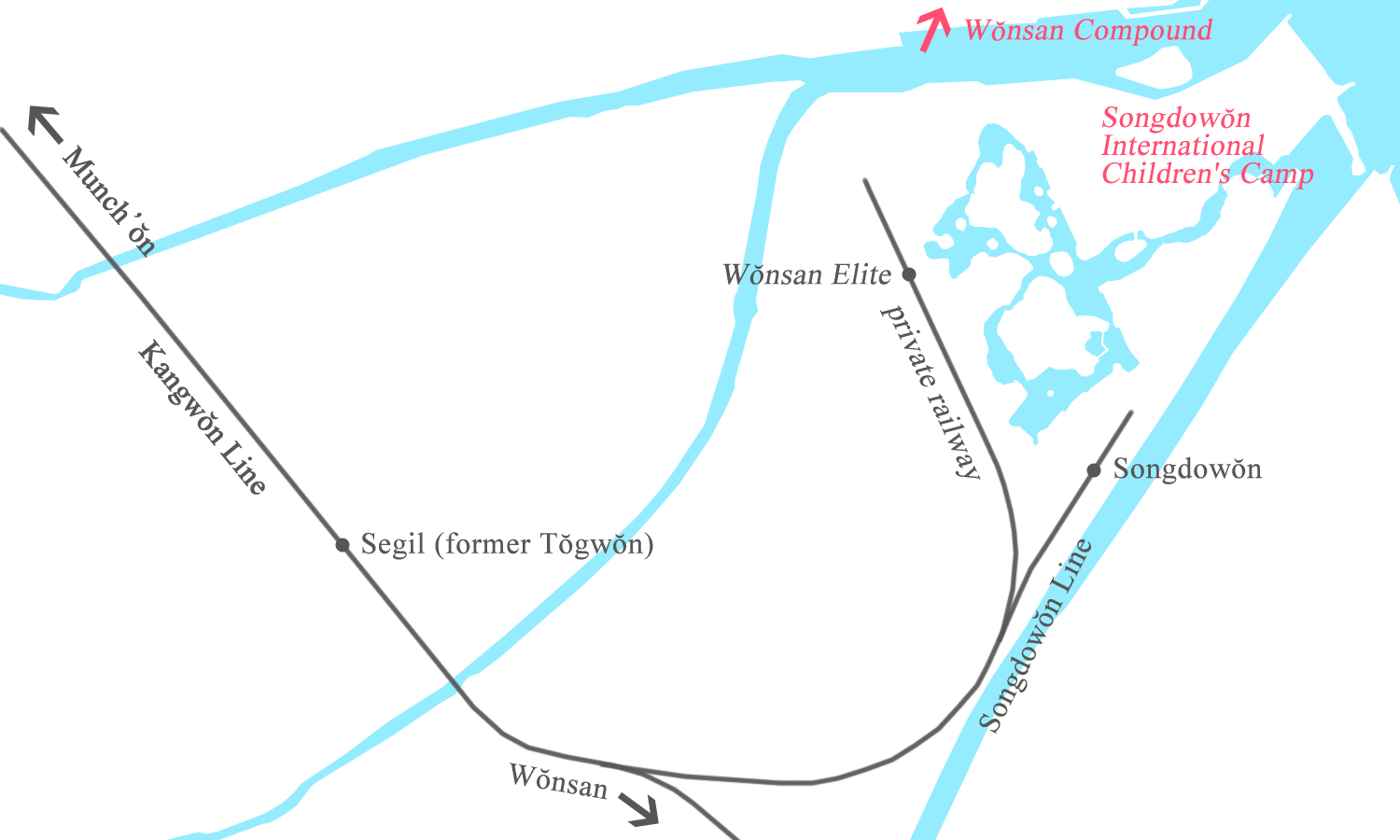

Overview
- Native name: 송도원선 (松濤園線)
- Status: Operational
- Owner: Korean State Railway
- Locale: Wŏnsan-si
- Termini: Segil; Songdowŏn
- Stations: 2

Service
- Type: Heavy rail, Freight rail Regional rail
- Operator: Korean State Railway

History
- Opened: 23 September 2014

Technical
- Line length: 2.7 km (1.7 mi)
- Number of tracks: Single track
- Track gauge: 1,435 mm (4 ft 8 1/2 in) standard gauge
- Electrification: 3000 V DC Overhead line

- Songdowon Line
- Hangul: 송도원선
- Hanja: 松濤園線
- RR: Songdowonseon
- MR: Songdowŏnsŏn

The Songdowŏn Line is an electrified secondary railway line of the Korean State Railway in Wŏnsan Municipal City, North Korea, running from Segil on the Kangwŏn Line to Songdowŏn.

It is not known when the line from Wŏnsan (actually, the line branches off from Segil) to Songdowŏn was opened, but the Songdowŏn−Segil section was opened on 23 September 2014, with a special ceremonial train marking the opening; this inaugural train was pulled by a Sŏngun Red Flag-class locomotive.

Songdowŏn is the site of the Songdowon International Children's Camp, and there is a resort.

== Route ==
A yellow background in the "Distance" box indicates that section of the line is not electrified.

Distance (km)		Station Name		Former Name		
Total	S2S	Transcribed	Chosŏn'gŭl (Hanja)	Transcribed	Chosŏn'gŭl (Hanja)	Connections
0.0	0.0	Segil	세길 (-)			Kangwŏn Line
2.7	2.7	Songdowŏn	송도원 (松濤園)			
