= Cheongsan station =

Railway station in South Korea

청산; Cheongsan
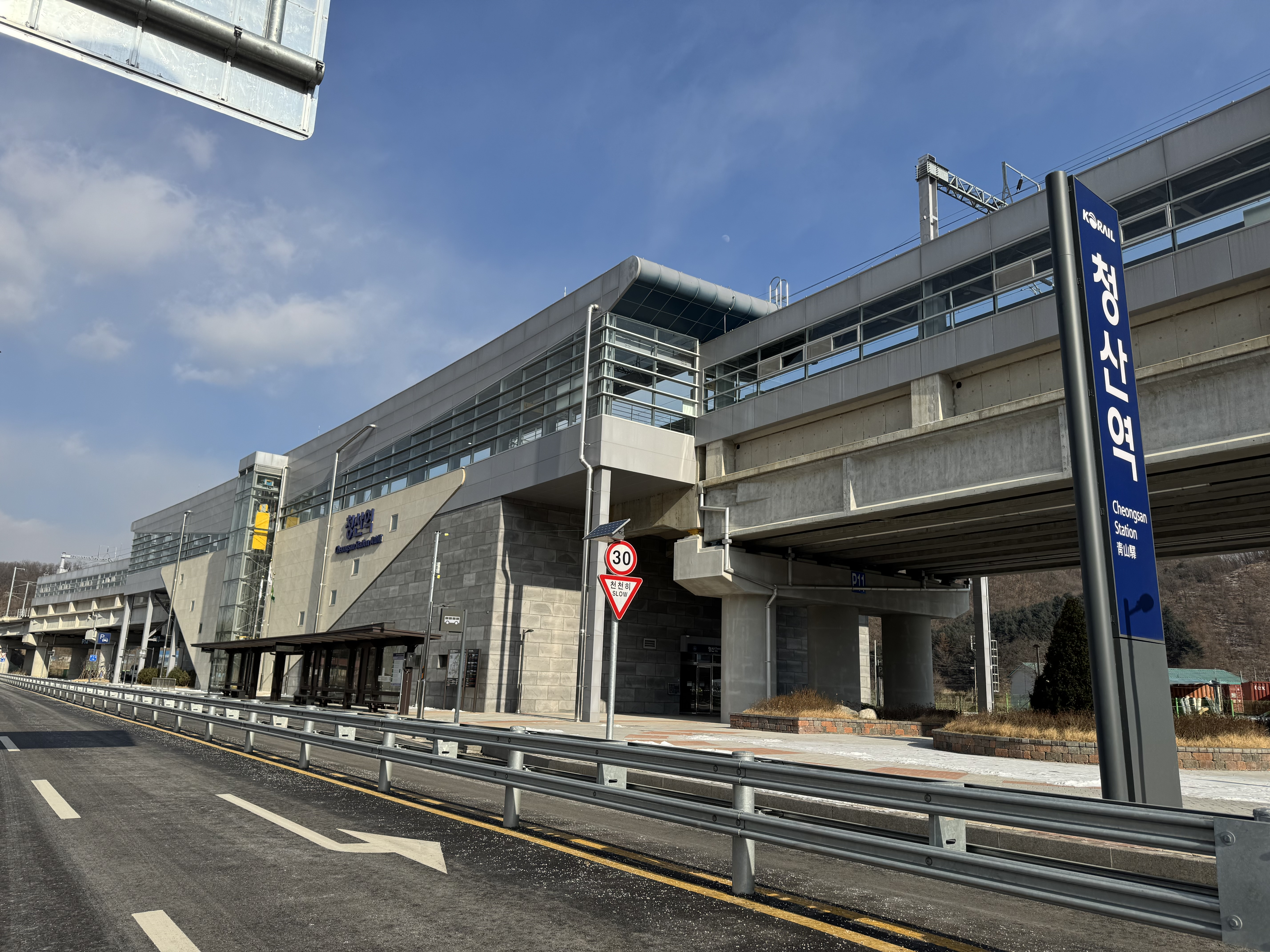

Korean name
- Hangul: 청산역
- Hanja: 靑山驛
- Revised Romanization: Cheongsannyeok
- McCune–Reischauer: Chŏngsannyŏk

General information
- Location: 72 Cheongsin-ro, Cheongsan-myeon, Yeoncheon-gun, Gyeonggi-do; South Korea
- Coordinates: 37°59′43″N 127°4′28″E
- Operator: Korail
- Line: Gyeongwon Line

Construction
- Structure type: Elevated

History
- Opened: December 30, 1951 (as Choseong-ri station); December 16, 2023 (as Cheongsan station)

Services
Preceding station	Seoul Metropolitan Subway	Following station
Jeongok towards Yeoncheon	Line 1	Soyosan towards Incheon
Location

Cheongsan station (Korean: 청산역; Hanja: 靑山驛; RR: Cheongsan-yeok) is an elevated metro station on Line 1 of the Seoul Subway in Yeoncheon, South Korea.

The station was first opened as Choseong-ri station (Korean: 소요산역; Hanja: 哨城里驛; RR: Choseong-ri-yeok) on Gyeongwon Line on December 30, 1951. During the electrification work of the Dongducheon - Yeoncheon section of Gyeongwon Line, the station was replaced by a newly built elevated station at about 1 km north of the original station site. The new station was also renamed to the current name. On December 16, 2023, the new station opened as Seoul Subway Line 1 was extended from Soyosan to Yeoncheon.

== History ==
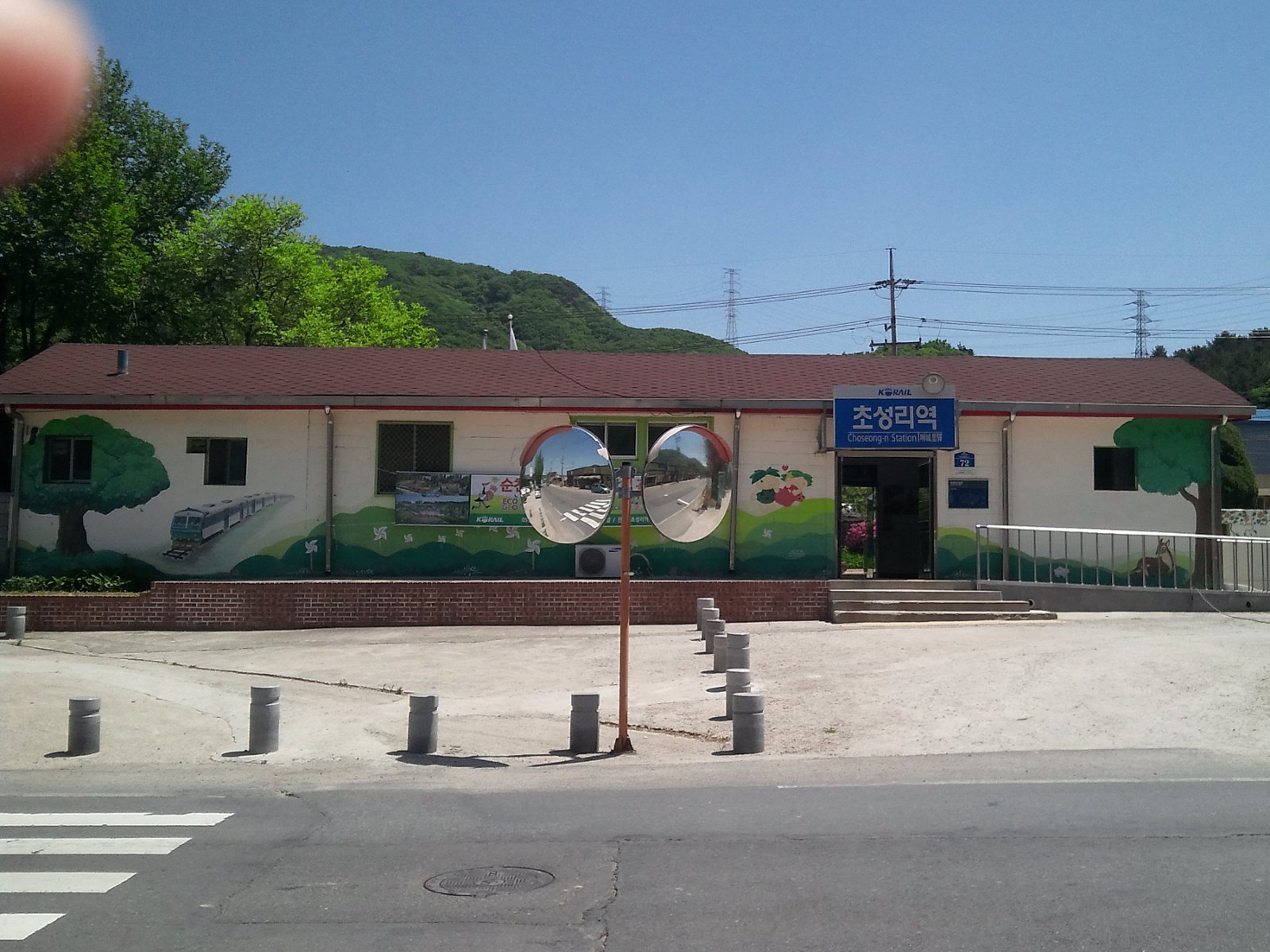
The old, ground-level Choseong-ri station (Now not in use)

On December 15, 2006, when the Seoul Subway Line 1 was extended to Soyosan station, the number of commuter train passengers at this station plummeted as it became easier to take buses within Yeoncheon-gun and transfer to Line 1 at Soyosan station. From July 28, 2011, operations of the station were completely suspended due to the washing away of the Choseong Bridge (which is located between this station and Hantangang station) caused by heavy rain. On March 21, 2012, the Gyeongwon Line commuter train resumed operation. On July 1, 2012, the number of commuter trains serving this station increased from 11 to 17 each way per day.

During the extension project of Seoul Subway Line 1 to Yeoncheon, a new station was built at about 1 km north of the original site (which was in front of the Cheongsan-myeon Administrative Welfare Center), near Choseong Elementary School. On December 16, 2023, when the Seoul Subway Line 1 Dongducheon - Yeoncheon extension section opened, it became a subway station.

=== Timeline ===
- December 30, 1951: Operation began as Choseong-ri station (Hanja: 哨城里驛) in Choseong-ri, Cheongsan-myeon, Pocheon-gun, Gyeonggi-do.
- September 10, 1953: Transferred to the Railway Administration
- August 10, 1959: Promoted to regular station
- December 1, 2008: Designated as a station for on-board ticket service and ticket machines were removed.
- July 28, 2011: Temporary suspension of operations due to track damage caused by heavy rains, with tourist and freight trains running only to this station.
- March 21, 2012: Commuter train service resumed after restoration of the Choseong Bridge, and the number of one-way trains was reduced to six per day.
- July 1, 2012: Number of commuter train service increased from 11 to 17 each way per day.
- October 31, 2014: Construction work began on the single-track section of Seoul Subway Line 1.
- July 2, 2018: Commuter trains ran to Yeoncheon station after track improvement work on the Gyeongwon Line between Yeoncheon and Baengmagoji.
- April 1, 2019: Gyeongwon Line service temporarily suspended between Dongducheon and Yeoncheon due to electrification work. Replacement buses operated 32 times daily.
- November 21, 2023: station name changed from Choseong-ri station to Cheongsan station
- December 16, 2023: the new elevated Cheongsan station opened as part of Seoul Subway Line after the completion of electrification work between Dongducheon and Yeoncheon.

== Station Layout ==
2F; Platform	Side platform, doors will open on the left
2F; Platform	Southbound	Seoul Subway Line 1 towards Incheon (Soyosan) →
2F; Platform	Northbound	← Seoul Subway Line 1 towards Yeoncheon (Jeongok)
2F; Platform	Side platform, doors will open on the left

1F	Concourse	Turnstiles, Customer Service, Washrooms, Exit

Platform screen doors are installed on the platforms.

== Patronage ==
The 2023 data reflects the 16-day period from December 16 (the opening date) to December 31, 2023.

Route		Average daily number of people (people/day)		Reference
Route		2022	2023	Reference
Gyeongwon Line	Boarding	Not opened yet	139	
Gyeongwon Line	Getting off	Not opened yet	130	

== Around the station ==
- Cheongsan-myeon Administrative Welfare Center
- Choseong-ri medicinal spring
