= Chonnae County =

Ch'ŏnnae County 천내군
- County

Korean transcription(s)
  - Chosŏn'gŭl: 천내군
  - Hancha: 川內郡
  - McCune-Reischauer: Ch'ŏnnae-gun
  - Revised Romanization: Cheonnae-gun
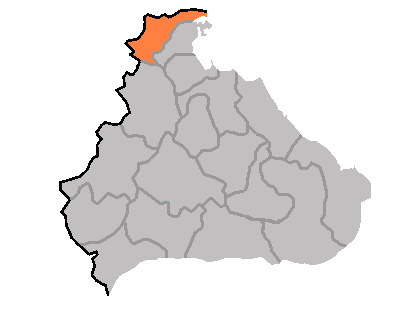
- Map of Kangwon showing the location of Chonnae
- Country: North Korea
- Province: Kangwŏn Province
- Administrative divisions: 1 ŭp, 3 workers' districts, 15 ri

Area
  - Total: 385.6 km^{2} (148.9 sq mi)

Population (2008)
  - Total: 85,123
  - Density: 220.8/km^{2} (571.8/sq mi)

Ch'ŏnnae County is a kun, or county, in Kangwŏn province, North Korea. Originally part of Munch'ŏn, it was made a separate county as part of the general reorganization of local government in December 1952.

== Physical features ==
Ch'ŏnnae borders the Sea of Japan (East Sea of Korea) to the east. Most of the terrain is mountainous, but there is level ground near the coast in the northeast. The chief stream is the Ch'ŏnt'an River (천탄강). The county's area is roughly 70% forestland.

== Administrative divisions ==
Ch'ŏnnae county is divided into 1 ŭp (town), 3 rodongjagu (workers' districts) and 15 ri (villages):

- Ch'ŏnnae-ŭp
- Hwara-rodongjagu
- Ryongdam-rodongjagu
- Sinsal-lodongjagu
- Changp'ung-ri
- Hoebong-ri
- Inhŭng-ri
- Kŭmsŏng-ri
- Kup'o-ri
- P'ungjŏl-li
- Roul-li
- Ryongru-ri
- Sinam-ri
- Sinhŭng-ri
- Sŭngjŏl-li
- Taeyang-ri
- Tangch'i-ri
- Tonghŭng-ri
- Yŏmjŏl-li

== Economy ==
=== Agriculture ===
In the northeast, the dominant industry is agriculture. The chief local crops are rice, maize, and soybeans; sericulture (silk farming) and orcharding also play a role.

=== Mining ===
Mines extract local mineral deposits including limestone and anthracite.

== Transport ==
The Kangwŏn Line of the Korean State Railway runs through Ch'ŏnnae county, with a short branchline connecting Ch'ŏnnae-ŭp to the mainline. The county is also served by roads.

== See also ==
- Geography of North Korea
- Administrative divisions of North Korea
