= Woljeong-ri station =

Defunct railway station in South Korea

Coordinates: 38°18′30″N 127°13′38″E

Woljeong-ri station is a closed railway station on the Gyeongwon Line in South Korea. It was closed by the Korean War. It is a noted place in the Korean Demilitarized Zone.

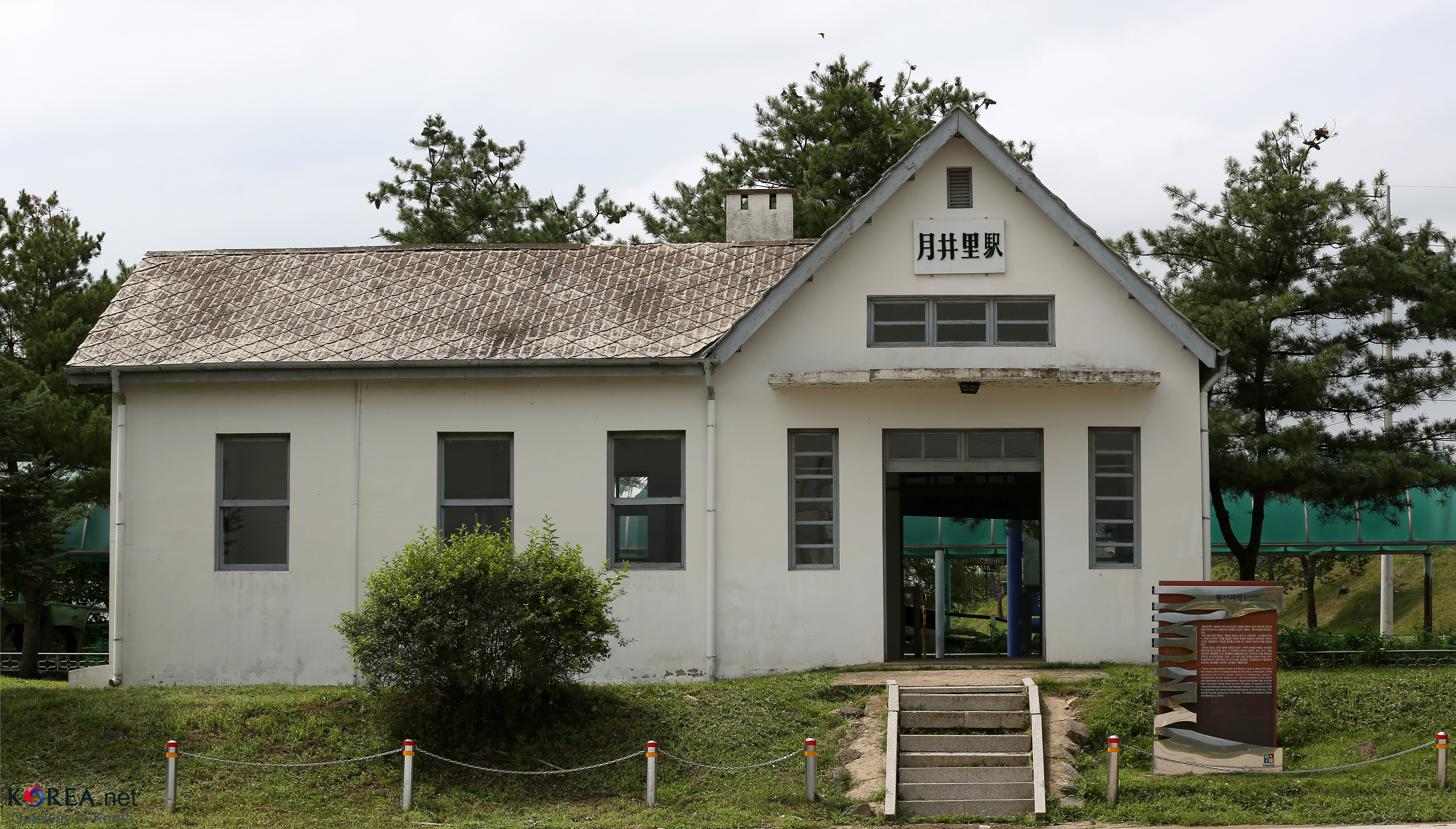
Woljeong-ri station, 2014

== History ==
Woljeong-ri station is a historical building in the DMZ at Cheorwon. This tourist attraction, which can only be visited on escorted security tours of the DMZ, is an abandoned railway station on the northernmost end of Korail's Gyeongwon Line.

Near the station was a small yard where rail stock was stored or shunted before leaving for Wonsan, now in North Korea, along the former Gyeongwon Line. Behind the station building, there remains the wreck of a train bombed during the Korean War. The train was used by the North Korean army, and was bombed by U.N. forces. "The windows of the train car are twisted toward the sky and the frame and the body of the train are crooked and rusty."

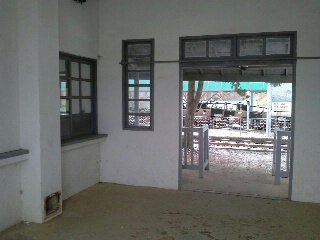
Inside Woljeong-ri station

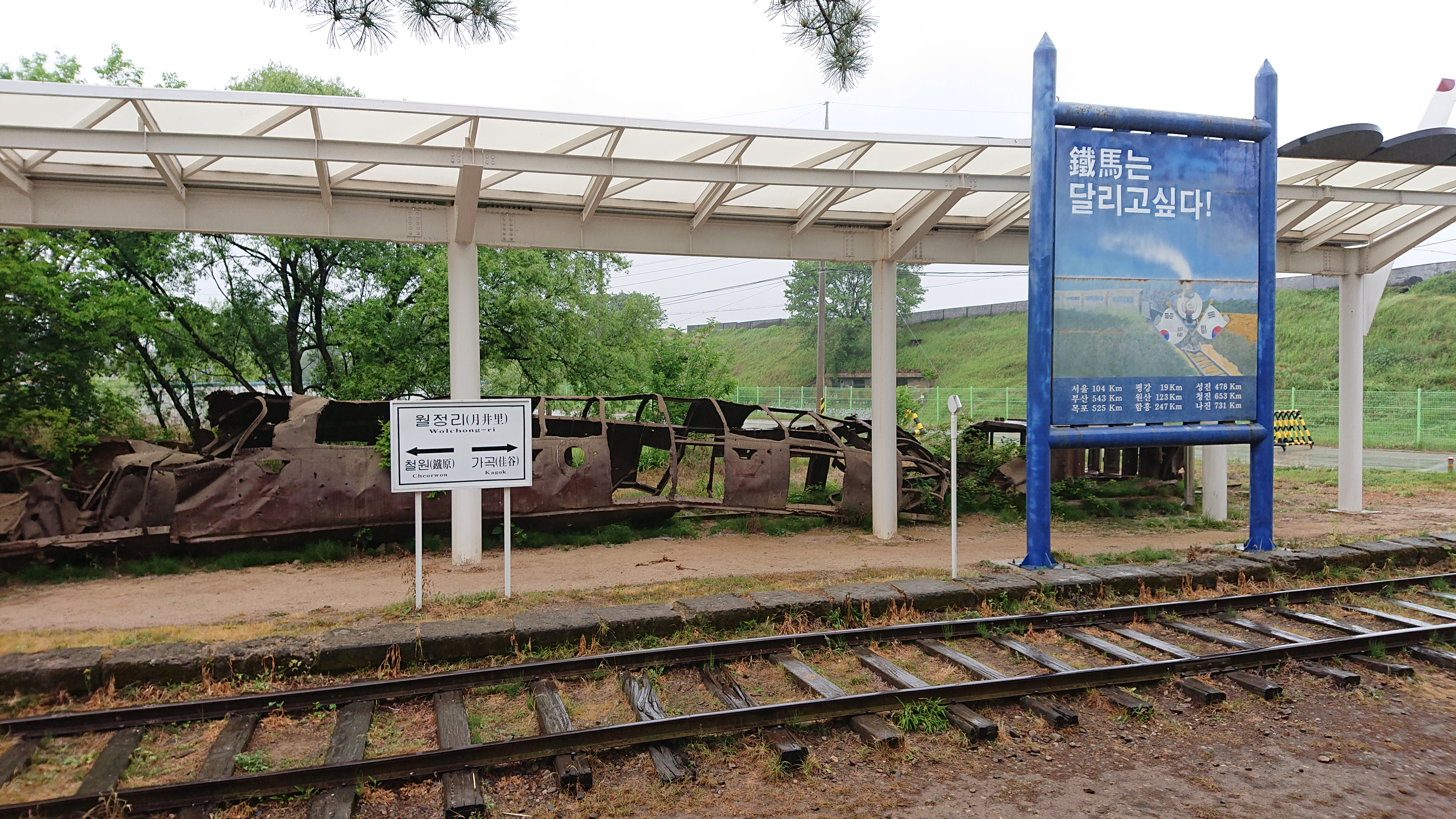
Train wreck and refurbished platform of Woljeong-ri station

In 2012, as part of the history of its time, it had become a place where artists meet and exhibit their works. At the closed railway station, works by Noh Suntag, British artist Simon Morley, and a video installation artist by Kim Sylbee were on display. "Kim created the video installation Friendly Fire, which presents a science-fiction story of fratricidal tragedy, paralleling the situation on the Korean Peninsula." "It's parallel from our current situation but also my own projection of the future from reading history,” said Kim. “I called this project Friendly Fire; you're shooting not your enemy but your friend. There's kind of a more tender feeling in [the name]."

In 2014, artists again visited the northernmost region of South Korea, for an art presentation, with the railroad division of the Gyeongwon Line building's abandoned space utilized as part of the project. Artist Choi Jae's blue neon light shining on the floor inside the building, reading, "No borders exist in nature", was an artistic work which was part of the exhibit.

== See also ==
- DMZ Train
