= Pyonggang County =

Coordinates: 38.3214°N 127.4644°E

P'yŏnggang County 평강군
- County

Korean transcription(s)
  - Chosŏn'gŭl: 평강군
  - Hancha: 平康郡
  - McCune-Reischauer: P'yŏnggang-gun
  - Revised Romanization: Pyeonggang-gun
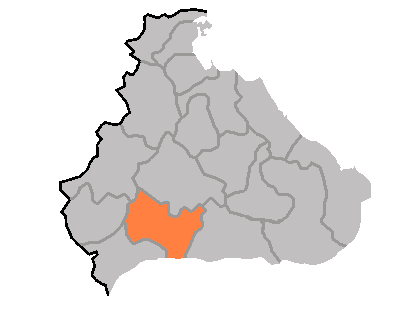
- Map of Kangwon showing the location of Pyonggang
- Country: North Korea
- Province: Kangwŏn
- Administrative divisions: 1 ŭp, 30 ri

Area
  - Total: 708 km^{2} (273 sq mi)

Population (2008 census)
  - Total: 90,425
  - Density: 128/km^{2} (331/sq mi)

P'yŏnggang County is a kun, or county, in Kangwŏn province, North Korea. It borders Sep'o to the north, Ch'ŏrwŏn to the south, Ich'ŏn to the west, and Kimhwa to the east.

== Physical features ==
A portion of the county is occupied by the Ryongam wetlands, which also cross into Ch'ŏrwŏn. Most of the county's terrain is mountainous, although there a few small expanses of level ground. The Kwangju and Majŏllyŏng mountains pass through P'yŏnggang. The region is prone to heavy rains.

== History ==
The P'yŏnggang area was known as Puyang hyŏn during the Koguryŏ period, and as Kangp'yŏng (강평) under Silla. In the Koryŏ Dynasty, it was included in Tongju (동주); in the Chosŏn dynasty, it took its modern name.

== Climate ==
Climate data for Pyonggang (1991–2020)
Month	Jan	Feb	Mar	Apr	May	Jun	Jul	Aug	Sep	Oct	Nov	Dec	Year
Mean daily maximum °C (°F)	−1.2 (29.8)	2.0 (35.6)	8.1 (46.6)	15.8 (60.4)	21.7 (71.1)	25.3 (77.5)	26.4 (79.5)	27.5 (81.5)	23.8 (74.8)	17.9 (64.2)	9.0 (48.2)	0.8 (33.4)	14.8 (58.6)
Daily mean °C (°F)	−7.0 (19.4)	−3.6 (25.5)	2.4 (36.3)	9.2 (48.6)	15.3 (59.5)	19.9 (67.8)	22.5 (72.5)	22.9 (73.2)	17.9 (64.2)	11.1 (52.0)	3.4 (38.1)	−4.4 (24.1)	9.1 (48.4)
Mean daily minimum °C (°F)	−13.3 (8.1)	−9.4 (15.1)	−3.1 (26.4)	2.5 (36.5)	9.2 (48.6)	14.8 (58.6)	19.1 (66.4)	19.0 (66.2)	12.6 (54.7)	4.8 (40.6)	−1.9 (28.6)	−9.4 (15.1)	3.7 (38.7)
Average precipitation mm (inches)	11.5 (0.45)	24.0 (0.94)	25.4 (1.00)	65.6 (2.58)	92.5 (3.64)	114.6 (4.51)	369.9 (14.56)	286.6 (11.28)	108.4 (4.27)	51.4 (2.02)	40.4 (1.59)	21.6 (0.85)	1,211.9 (47.71)
Average precipitation days (≥ 0.1 mm)	5.0	5.0	5.8	6.9	7.7	8.8	14.4	12.4	6.9	5.0	6.5	6.5	90.9
Average snowy days	5.2	3.9	3.5	0.5	0.0	0.0	0.0	0.0	0.0	0.0	2.0	5.5	20.6
Average relative humidity (%)	73.3	70.3	68.9	64.7	69.4	76.7	86.1	84.9	79.8	74.4	74.6	74.4	74.8
Source: Korea Meteorological Administration

== Administrative divisions ==
On August 15, 1945, P'yŏnggang county included 1 ŭp (P'yŏnggang), 6 myŏn (Sŏ, Nam, Hyŏnnae, Mokchŏn, Sep'o, Yujin). Presently, it is divided into 1 ŭp and 30 ri (villages):

- P'yŏnggang-ŭp
- Aptong-ri
- Chawŏl-li
- Chŏngsal-li
- Chŏnsŭng-ri
- Ch'ŏn'am-ri
- Haebang-ri
- Haju-ri
- Hasong-ri
- Hwaam-ri
- Kagong-ri
- Kŏnch'ŏl-li
- Kŭmgong-ri
- Kŭndong-ri
- Munbong-ri
- Munsal-li
- Naech'ŏl-li
- Namyang-ri
- Oktong-ri
- Pokkye-ri
- Pongrae-ri
- Rangha-ri
- Rangwŏl-li
- Risudŏng-ri
- Sanggap-ri
- Sangsonggwal-li
- Sangwŏl-li
- Sinjŏng-ri
- Sŏngsal-li
- Sut'ae-ri
- T'apkŏ-ri

In addition, Jeongyeon-ri (정연리) in Galmal-Eup of Cheorwon County was traditionally part of Pyonggang County, and was the only part of the county that was ceded south after the Korean War.

== Economy ==
The county is well-suited to agriculture, and rice farming is especially developed. In addition, the mines of P'yŏnggang extract gold, tungsten, nepheline, zircon, alunite, and diatomaceous earth.

== See also ==
- Geography of North Korea
- Administrative divisions of North Korea
- Kangwon (North Korea)
