= Kowon County =

Coordinates: 39.44049°N 127.23848°E

Kowon County 고원군
- County

Korean transcription(s)
  - Hanja: 高原郡
  - McCune-Reischauer: Kowŏn kun
  - Revised Romanization: Gowon-gun
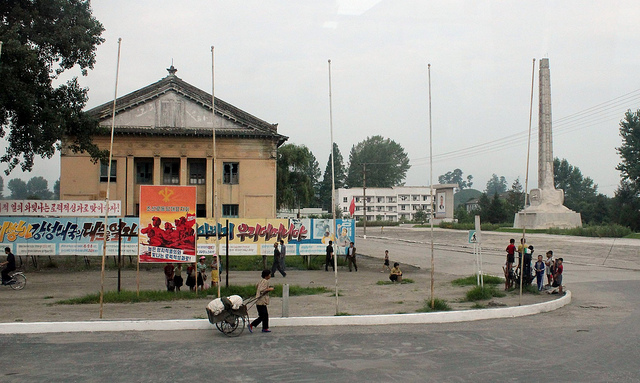
- Propaganda murals at the Kowon-ŭp, North Korea.

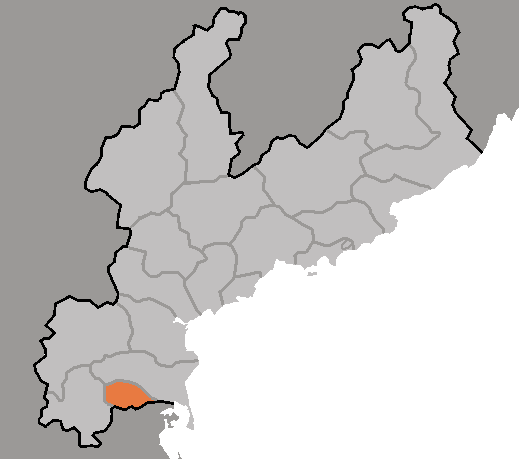
- Map of South Hamgyong showing the location of Kowon
- Country: North Korea
- Province: South Hamgyong Province
- Administrative divisions: 1 ŭp, 1 workers' district, 18 ri

Area
  - Total: 255 km^{2} (98 sq mi)

Population (2008)
  - Total: 94,963
  - Density: 372/km^{2} (965/sq mi)

Kowŏn County is a county in South Hamgyŏng province, North Korea. It lies at the southern tip of the province.

== Physical features ==
The highest point is Palbongsan. The western reaches of the county are high and mountainous, while the east is a low-lying plain. Major rivers and streams include the Chŏnt'an River (전탄강), Tŏkchi River (덕지강), Sabakch'ŏn (사박천), and the Kuryongch'ŏn (구룡천). 54% of the county's area is forested. The climate is generally continental, but is moderated by foehn winds blowing from the mountains. This makes it one of the warmer parts of the province.

== Administrative divisions ==
Kowŏn county is divided into 1 ŭp (town), 1 rodongjagu (workers' district) and 18 ri (villages):

- Kowŏn-ŭp
- Puraesal-lodongjagu
- Chŏnt'al-li
- Chungp'yŏng-ri
- Hapy'ŏng-ri
- Hwangsong-ri
- Kakch'ŏl-li
- Kunnae-ri
- Midul-li
- Namhŭng-ri
- P'ungnam-ri
- Rach'ŏl-li
- Sangp'yŏng-ri
- Sangsal-li
- Sinch'ang-ri
- Songch'ŏl-li
- Songhŭng-ri
- Tŏkchi-ri
- Unha-ri
- Wŏnbong-ri

== Economy ==
=== Agriculture ===
Agriculture is the predominant local industry. Orcharding and livestock raising are also carried out, as is sericulture (silk farming).

=== Mining and manufacturing ===
There are deposits of limestone in the county, and mining and construction-materials manufacturing also contribute to the local economy.

== Transport ==
Kowŏn is connected to the rest of North Korea by rail and road. The P'yŏngra and Kangwŏn lines of the Korean State Railway run through the county.

== See also ==
- Geography of North Korea
- Administrative divisions of North Korea
