= Chorwon County =

Coordinates: 38.3431°N 126.9058°E

Ch'ŏrwŏn County 철원군
- County

Korean transcription(s)
  - Chosŏn'gŭl: 철원군
  - Hancha: 鐵原郡
  - McCune-Reischauer: Ch'ŏrwŏn-gun
  - Revised Romanization: Cheorwon-gun
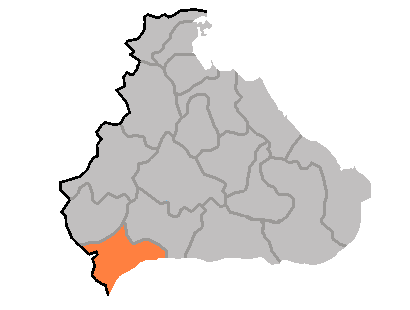
- Country: North Korea
- Province: Kangwŏn Province
- Administrative divisions: 1 ŭp, 36 ri

Area
  - Total: 457 km^{2} (176 sq mi)

Population (2008 census)
  - Total: 62,418
  - Density: 137/km^{2} (354/sq mi)

Ch'ŏrwŏn County ([ˈtsʰɔɾwɔn‿ɡun]) is a kun, or county, in Kangwŏn province, North Korea. Portions of it were once a single county together with the county of the same name in South Korea; other portions were added from neighbouring counties in the 1952 reorganization of local governments. After the initial division of Korea, the entire county lay to the Northern side of the dividing line, but in the course of the Korean War part of the county was taken by the South.

== Geography ==
The county's terrain is mountainous in the north, but gradually more level towards the south. The Masingryong Mountains pass through the county; the highest point of which is the 1,360-metre (4,460 ft) Taehwang Peak (대왕덕산). The chief watercourse is the Rimjin River. Approximately 54% of the county's area is occupied by forests.

== Administrative divisions ==
Ch'ŏrwŏn county is divided into 1 ŭp (town) and 36 ri (villages):

- Ch'ŏrwŏn-ŭp
- Chŏksal-li
- Chŏktong-ri
- Chŏngdong-ri
- Chŏt'am-ri
- Chunggang-ri
- Hasinch'ŏm-ri
- Hoesal-li
- Kalhyŏl-li
- Kangsal-li
- Kasŭng-ri
- Kŏmsa-ri
- Mabang-ri
- Majang-ri
- Miram-ri
- Munam-ri
- Naemul-li
- Odong-ri
- Oehang-ri
- Ot'al-li
- Paengrosal-li
- Pansŏng-ri
- Pomang-ri
- Puap-ri
- Ripsŏng-ri
- Ryonghang-ri
- Ryudaep'o-ri
- Samsa-ri
- Sangha-ri
- Sangmasal-li
- Sinjil-li
- Songhyŏl-li
- Taejŏng-ri
- Tokkŏm-ri
- Tomil-li
- Wŏlam-ri
- Yujŏng-ri

== Economy ==
The chief local industry is agriculture. The county is a major producer of rice for North Korea. Additional crops include maize, soybeans, wheat, and barley. Other local industries include mining, sericulture, and orcharding. The county is host to deposits of coal, iron ore, magnetite, and manganese. There is little manufacturing.

== Transportation ==
The county is not connected to the national rail grid, but is served by roads.

== See also ==
- Geography of North Korea
- Administrative divisions of North Korea
- Kangwon (North Korea)
- Anhyop County
