= Hantangang station =

Railway station in South Korea

Coordinates: 38.0071°N 127.065°E

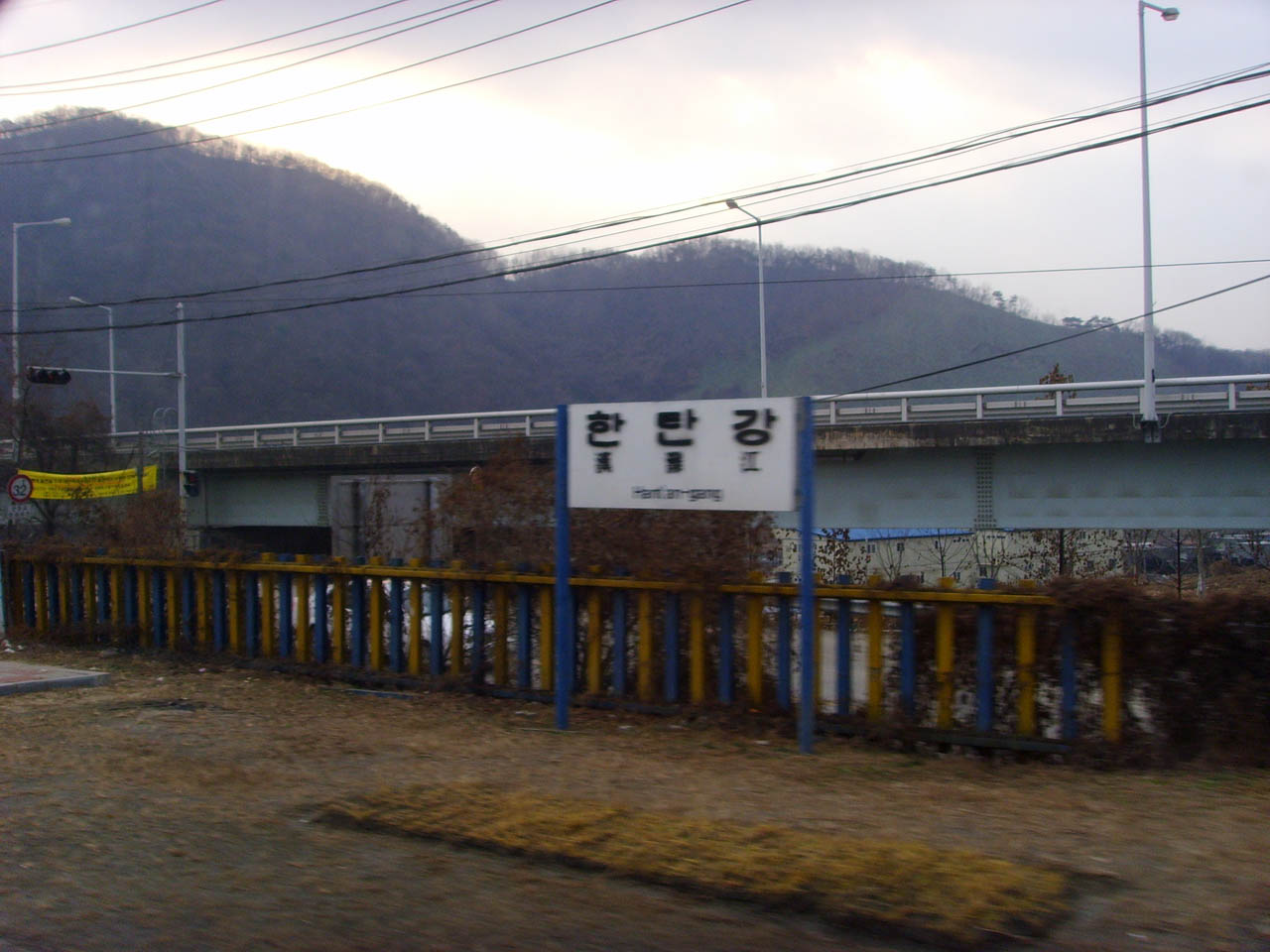
the station in 2007

Hantangang Station was a railway station on the Gyeongwon Line in South Korea.

Rail services to this station ceased on April 1, 2019, when an extension of Seoul Subway Line 1 to Yeoncheon Station began construction. The station was permanently closed on November 21, 2023.
