= Ichon County =

Ich'ŏn County 이천군
- County

Korean transcription(s)
  - Chosŏn'gŭl: 이천군
  - Hancha: 伊川郡
  - McCune-Reischauer: Ich'ŏn-gun
  - Revised Romanization: Icheon-gun
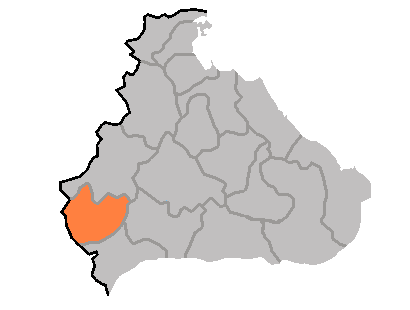
- Map of Kangwon showing the location of Ichon
- Country: North Korea
- Province: Kangwŏn Province
- Administrative divisions: 1 ŭp, 22 ri

Area
  - Total: 605 km^{2} (234 sq mi)

Population (2008)
  - Total: 57,563
  - Density: 95.1/km^{2} (246/sq mi)

Ich'ŏn County is a kun, or county, in northern Kangwŏn province, North Korea. The terrain is predominantly high and mountainous; the highest point is Myongidoksan, 1,585 meters above sea level. The county's borders run along the Masingryong and Ryongam ranges. The chief stream is the Rimjin River.

== Administrative divisions ==
Ich'ŏn county is divided into 1 ŭp (town) and 22 ri (villages):

- Ich'ŏn-ŭp
- Changdong-ri
- Changjae-ri
- Ch'uktong-ri
- Hakpong-ri
- Hoesal-li
- Kaech'ŏl-li
- Kŏnsŏl-li
- Mundong-ri
- Murŭng-ri
- Ohyŏl-li
- Ryongjŏl-li
- Sach'ŏng-ri
- Sanch'am-ri
- Sangha-ri
- Sanji-ri
- Simdong-ri
- Sindang-ri
- Sinhŭng-ri
- Sŏngbung-ri
- Songjŏng-ri
- Umi-ri
- Ŭnhaengjŏng-ri

== Economy ==
=== Agriculture ===
Agriculture is limited to the low-lying regions. Sericulture (silk farming) is also practised. Due to the abundant woods, lumbering is also an important industry.

=== Mining ===
There are deposits of gold, asbestos, nickel and lead in the county.

== Transport ==
Ich'ŏn is served by roads, and by the Ch'ŏngnyŏn Ich'ŏn line of the Korean State Railway.

== See also ==
- Geography of North Korea
- Administrative divisions of North Korea
