= Sepo County =

Sep'o County 세포군
- County
- 세포군 · Sepo County

Korean transcription(s)
  - Chosŏn'gŭl: 세포군
  - Hancha: 洗浦郡
  - McCune–Reischauer: Sep'o-gun
  - Revised Romanization: Sepo-gun
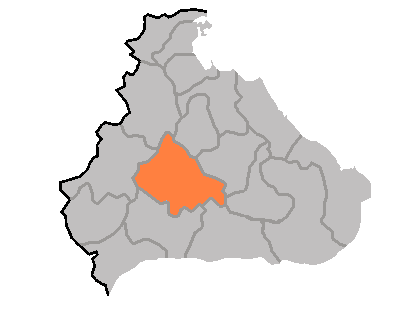
- Map of Kangwon showing the location of Sepo
- Country: North Korea
- Province: Kangwŏn Province
- Administrative divisions: 1 ŭp, 1 workers' district, 24 ri

Area
  - Total: 969 km^{2} (374 sq mi)

Population (2008)
  - Total: 61,113
  - Density: 63.1/km^{2} (163/sq mi)

Sep'o is a kun, or county, in Kangwŏn province, North Korea. It was created as a separate entity following the division of Korea.

== Physical features ==
The county is primarily mountainous, and is traversed by the Masingryŏng and Kwangju ranges. There are numerous mountains outside of these two ranges as well. The chief streams include the Namdaech'ŏn, Yongjich'ŏn, and Komitanch'ŏn (고미탄천). 75% of the county's area is occupied by forestland.

== Administrative divisions ==
Sep'o county is divided into 1 ŭp (town), 1 rodongjagu (workers' district) and 24 ri (villages):

- Sep'o-ŭp
- Changch'ol-lodongjagu
- Chŏngdong-ri
- Chungp'yŏng-ri
- Chungsam-ri
- Ch'ŏn'gi-ri
- Ch'up'yŏng-ri
- Kisal-li
- Naep'yŏng-ri
- Paeksal-li
- Pokmal-li
- Pukp'yŏng-ri
- Rimong-ri
- Sambang-ri
- Sangsul-li
- Sindong-ri
- Sinsaeng-ri
- Sŏha-ri
- Songp'o-ri
- Sŏngp'yŏng-ri
- Sŏngsal-li
- Taegong-ri
- Taemul-li
- Wŏnnam-ri
- Yaksu-ri
- Yuyŏl-li

== Economy ==
Sep'o is host to deposits of molybdenum, silver, zinc, and fluorite. Agriculture also contributes to the local economy; Sepo is particularly known for its radishes. In addition, livestock raising and orcharding play a role, and there is some small-scale manufacturing as well.

== Transport ==
Sep'o county is served by several stations on the Kangwŏn and Ch'ŏngnyŏn Ich'ŏn lines of the Korean State Railway, including Sep'o Ch'ŏngnyŏn station in Sep'o-ŭp, which is the junction point of the two lines.

== See also ==
- Geography of North Korea
- Administrative divisions of North Korea
- Kangwon (North Korea)
