= Kumya station =

Railway station in North Korea

Kŭmya station

General information
- Location: Kumya County, South Hamgyong; North Korea
- Coordinates: 39.5409°N 127.2491°E
- Operated by: Korean State Railway
- Lines: P'yŏngra Line; Kŭmya Line

History
- Previous names: Yŏnghŭng station
Location

Kŭmya station is a railway station in Kumya County, South Hamgyong, North Korea. It is located on the P'yŏngra Line of the Korean State Railway, and is the starting point of the Kŭmya Line.

== History ==
The station was originally opened by the Chosen Government Railway as Yŏnghŭng station, and received its current name after the establishment of the DPRK.
