= Kosan County =

Kosan County 고산군
- County

Korean transcription(s)
  - Chosŏn'gŭl: 고산군
  - Hancha: 高山郡
  - McCune-Reischauer: Kosan-gun
  - Revised Romanization: Gosan-gun
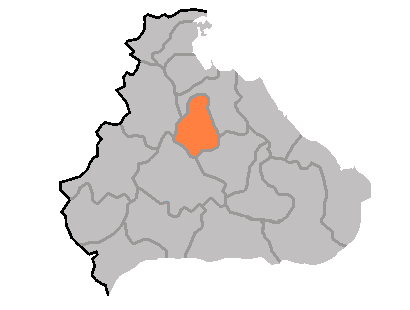
- Map of Kangwon showing the location of Kosan
- Coordinates: 38°51′23″N 127°25′18″E
- Country: North Korea
- Province: Kangwŏn Province
- Administrative divisions: 1 ŭp, 24 ri

Area
  - Total: 435 km^{2} (168 sq mi)

Population (2008)
  - Total: 103,579
  - Density: 238/km^{2} (617/sq mi)

Kosan is a kun, or county, in Kangwŏn province, North Korea.

== Physical features ==
The county is predominantly mountainous, with a central basin. Its highest point is Chuaesan. Major streams include the Namdaech'ŏn, Ryongjiwŏnch'ŏn, and Namsanch'ŏn. The county contains 13 reservoirs, and Forestland covers approximately 63.8% of its area.

== Administrative divisions ==
Kosan county is divided into 1 ŭp (town) and 24 ri (villages):

- Kosan-ŭp
- Chuch'ŏl-li
- Chukkŭm-ri
- Haebang-ri
- Hyŏnch'ang-ri
- Kŭm-ri
- Kŭmch'ŏl-li
- Kŭmp'ung-ri
- Kuryŏng-ri
- Kuŭp-ri
- Kwangmyŏng-ri
- Namsal-li
- Pongryŏl-li
- Pup'yŏng-ri
- Ranjŏng-ri
- Ryongjiwŏl-li
- Ryongsa-ri
- Sahyŏl-li
- Sant'al-li
- Sanyang-ri
- Sinhyŏl-li
- Sŏlbong-ri
- Sŏngbung-ri
- Yŏnho-ri
- Winam-ri

== Economy ==
=== Agriculture ===
Agriculture dominates local industry in Kosan, with crops including rice, maize, millet, wheat, barley, soybeans, and red beans. The region is particularly noted for its abundant production of fruit.

=== Mining ===
Mining is widely developed, exploiting the local deposits of gold, silver, copper, iron, limestone, lead, zinc, gypsum, and other minerals.

== Transport ==
Kosan county is served by the Kangwŏn Line of the Korean State Railway.

== See also ==
- Geography of North Korea
- Administrative divisions of North Korea
