= Kangwon Line =

Railway line in North Korea

Kangwŏn Line

Overview
- Native name: 강원선(江原線)
- Status: Operational
- Owner: Chosen Government Railway (1913–1945); Korean State Railway (since 1945); Korail (part, since 1953)
- Locale: South Hamgyŏng; Kangwŏn
- Termini: Kowŏn; P'yŏnggang
- Stations: 23

Service
- Type: Heavy rail, Passenger/freight rail Regional rail
- Operator(s): Korean State Railway; Korail (part, since 1953)
- Depot(s): Wŏnsan

History
- Opened: Mainline: 1913-1916

Technical
- Line length: 145.8 km (90.6 mi) in use
- Number of tracks: Single track
- Track gauge: 1,435 mm (4 ft 8 1/2 in) standard gauge
- Minimum radius: 300 m (980 ft)
- Electrification: 3000 V DC Overhead line
Route map
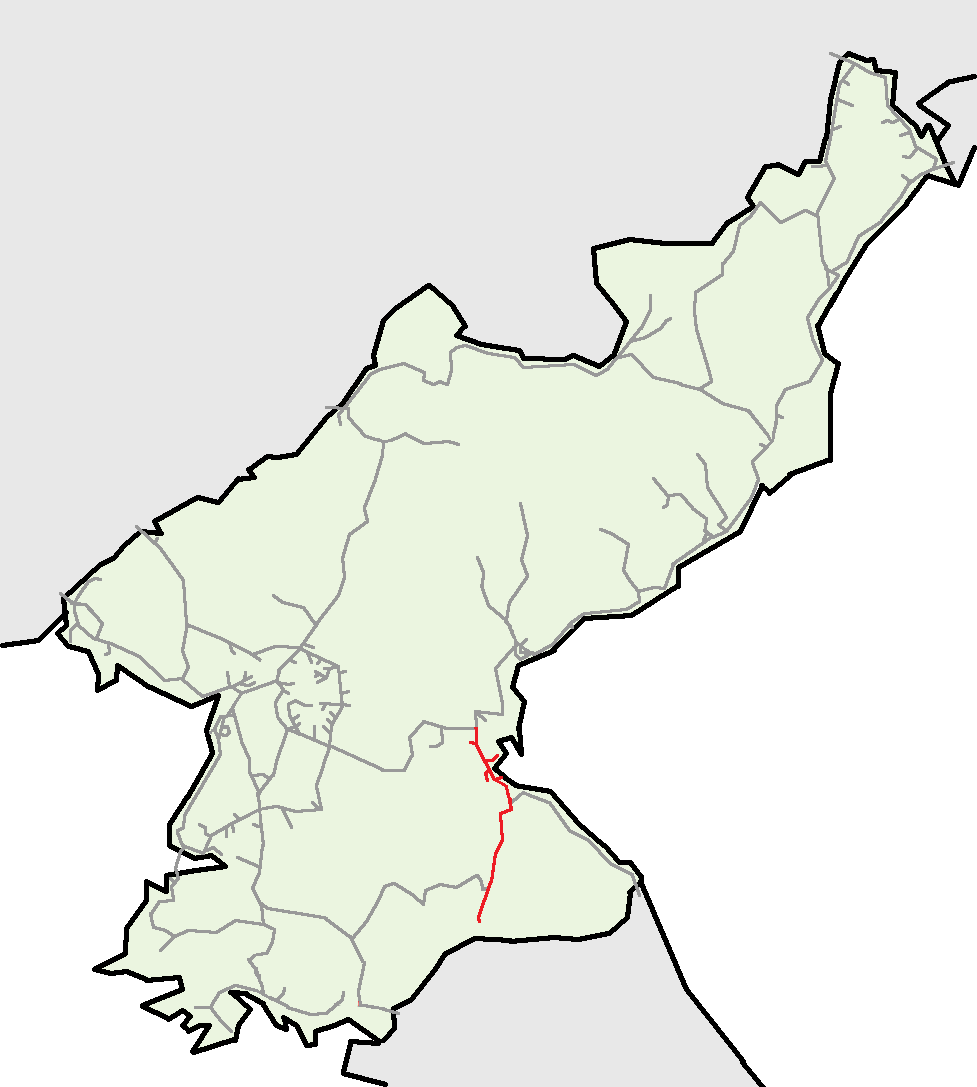

- Kangwon Line
- Hangul: 강원선
- Hanja: 江原線
- RR: Gangwonseon
- MR: Kangwŏnsŏn

The Kangwŏn Line is a 145.8 km (90.6 mi) electrified standard-gauge trunk line of the Korean State Railway of North Korea, connecting Kowŏn on the P'yŏngra Line to P'yŏnggang, providing an east–west connection between the P'yŏngra and Ch'ŏngnyŏn Ich'ŏn lines.

Although the line continues south across the Korean Demilitarized Zone, it is non-operational south of P'yŏnggang.

The ruling gradient is 25‰, the minimum curve radius is 300 m (980 ft); there are 94 bridges with a total length of 3,493 m (11,460 ft), and 18 tunnels with a total length of 6,243 m (20,482 ft). There are 23 stations on the line, with an average distance between stations of 6.5 km (4.0 mi). Wŏnsan Station is the most important station on the line; in addition to its passenger infrastructure, locomotive and freight car maintenance facilities are located there.

On 5 August 2015, South Korean President Park Geun-hye attended a ceremony launching work on the reconstruction of the 9.3 km (5.8 mi) Baengmagoji–Woljeong-ri section of Korail's Gyeongwon Line, which has been closed since the Korean War, as part of events marking the 70th anniversary of the partition of Korea. The works are to begin in October and are expected to be finished by 2017; the US $129 million project is being funded by the Unification Ministry. Park also stated her hope that the remaining 2.4 km (1.5 mi) section across the DMZ would be rebuilt soon, which would re-establish the old Kyŏngwŏn Line connecting Seoul to Wŏnsan.

== History ==
For the original line's history and other information prior to 1945, see Gyeongwon Line (1911–1945)

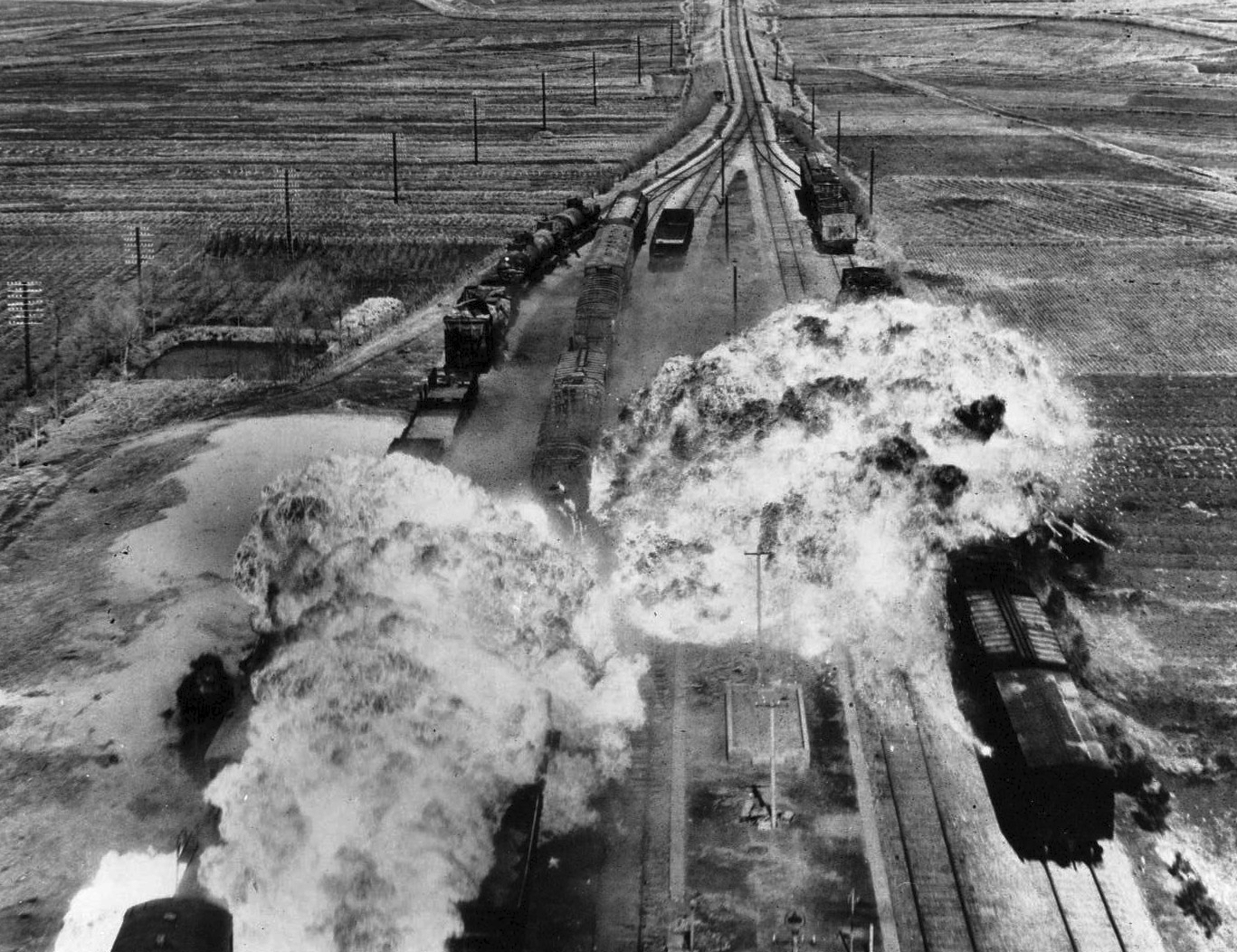
American aerial bombing of a station south of Wŏnsan in 1950.

The Kangwŏn Line's Wŏnsan-P'yŏnggang section was opened, along with the rest of the Kyŏngwŏn Line from Seoul to Wŏnsan, on 16 August 1914 (the Wŏnsan−Ryongjiwŏn section was completed on 21 August 1913, Pokkye−Kŏmbullang on 25 September 1913, Kosan−Ryongjiwŏn on 21 October 1913, Kŏmbullang−Sep'o on 21 June 1914, and Sep'o−Kosan on 16 August 1914, forming an important east–west transversal line.

The Wŏnsan−Kowŏn section was built as part of the Hamgyŏng Line of the Chosen Government Railway (Sentetsu); this line ran on the routing of Wŏnsan−Kowŏn (now part of the Kangwŏn Line), Kowŏn−Ch'ŏngjin (now part of the P'yŏngra Line), and Ch'ŏngjin−Sangsambong (now part of the Hambuk Line). The Wŏnsan−Kowŏn section was completed in two parts: Wŏnsan−Ongp'yŏng (at the time called Munch'ŏn Station) on 1 August 1915, and Munch'ŏn−Kowŏn−Kŭmya on 21 July 1916; the Kowŏn−Kŭmya section is now part of the P'yŏngra Line.

The south end of what is now the Kangwŏn line was where the first railway electrification projects in Korea took place. The first of these was the privately owned Kŭmgangsan Electric Railway, which was first opened in 1924 from Ch'ŏrwŏn to Kimhwa, and by 1931 had been extended all the way to Naegŭmgang. Also in the 1930s, Sentetsu, together with the South Manchuria Railway, was developing plans to create an electrified railway all the way from Pusan in Korea to Xinjing, capital of Manchukuo. The first stage of this plan was the electrification of the Kyŏngwŏn, Kyŏnggyŏng and Kyŏngin lines, and in March 1940, the Imperial Diet budgeted 3.6 million Yen for electrification equipment for this plan. Electrification of the Pokkye−Kosan section of the Kyŏngwŏn line began in December 1940; it was completed and commissioned on 27 March 1944, and commercial electric operations commenced on 1 April 1944.

After the partition of Korea following the end of the Pacific War, the Kyŏngwŏn Line was split along the 38th parallel between the stations of Hantangang and Ch'osŏngri, and the Korean State Railway, established following the nationalisation of all railways in North Korea in 1946, merged the truncated Wŏnsan−Ch'osŏngri section of the Kyŏngwŏn Line with the Wŏnsan−Kowŏn section of the former Hamgyŏng Line to create the Kangwŏn Line. Following the end of the Korean War and the establishment of the Military Demarcation Line, the section south of Wŏljŏngri ended up in South Korea, where the Korean National Railroad reabsorbed it into the Kyŏngwŏn Line. The section from P'yŏnggang to Kagok has been closed since the end of the war, and since then the line has its current name, from the two termini: P'yŏnggang and Wŏnsan. The line was severely damaged during the Korean War, but was quickly repaired after the war. The Kowŏn−Sep'o Ch'ŏngnyŏn section of the line was electrified in September 1980, and the electrification of the Sep'o Ch'ŏngnyŏn−P'yŏnggang section was completed in early 1986.

== Services ==
=== Freight ===
The Kangwŏn Line serves the ports at Wŏnsan and Munch'ŏn, and a number of industries including the smelter at Munch'ŏn and the May 18th Works; the primary goods received on the line are anthracite, zinc concentrates, coke, solvents etc., while the most important outbound goods include seafood and machinery. There is also a significant amount of through traffic on the line destined for points in North and South Hwanghae on the Ch'ŏngnyŏn Ich'ŏn line and beyond, such as coking coal imported from China for the Hwanghae Iron & Steel Complex, wood imported from Russia and chemical fertilisers produced in the Hamhŭng area. At Kalma is located the 4 June Rolling Stock Works, the DPRK's largest manufacturer of railway freight and passenger cars. A number of other important industries are located on the Wŏnsan Port Line, which connects to the Kangwŏn Line at Kalma.

=== Passenger ===
The following passenger trains are known to operate on this line:

- Express trains 13/14, operating between P'yŏngyang and P'yŏnggang, run on this line between Kowŏn and P'yŏnggang;
- Semi-express trains 117/118, operating between Taedonggang and P'yŏnggang, run on this line between Kowŏn and P'yŏnggang;
- Semi-express trains 128-129-130/131-132-133, operating between Kalma and Rajin, run on this line between Kalma and Kowŏn.

In the 1980s, there was a passenger service operated between Sariwŏn and Hamhŭng which ran via the Ch'ŏngnyŏn Ich'ŏn line and the Sep'o-Kowon section of the Kangwŏn line and another between Wŏnsan and P'yŏnggang, but this train was not present in the 2002 passenger timetables.

== Route ==
=== Mainline ===
Between Wŏnsan and Paehwa stations there is a bypass line under construction which will allow passenger trains to avoid passing through the primarily freight-only Kalma Station.

A yellow background in the "Distance" box indicates that section of the line is not electrified.

Distance (km)		Station Name		Former Name		
Total	S2S	Transcribed	Chosŏn'gŭl (Hanja)	Transcribed	Chosŏn'gŭl (Hanja)	Connections (former)
0.0	0.0	Kowŏn	고원 (高原)			P'yŏngra Line
7.5	7.5	Chŏnt'an	전탄 (前灘)			
12.1	4.6	Ryongdam	룡담 (龍潭)			Ch'ŏnnae Line
22.0	9.9	Ongp'yŏng	옥평 (玉坪)	Munch'ŏn	문천 (文川)	Munch'ŏn Port Line
29.4	7.4	Munch'ŏn	문천 (文川)	Munp'yŏng	문평 (文坪)	
36.5	7.1	Segil	세길			Songdowŏn Line
42.0	5.5	Wŏnsan	원산 (元山)			Wŏnsan Hwamul Branch
46.1	4.1	Kalma	갈마 (葛麻)			Wŏnsan Port Line
52.8	6.7	Paehwa	배화 (培花)			
57.7	4.9	Anbyŏn	안변 (安邊)			Kŭmgangsan Ch. Line
64.1	6.4	Namsan	남산 (南山)			
73.5	9.4	Kwangmyŏng	광명 (光明)	Sŏg'wangsa	석왕사 (釋王寺)	
81.6	8.1	Ryongjiwŏn	룡지원 (龍池院)			
88.1	6.5	Kosan	고산 (高山)			
97.4	9.3	Tonggari	동가리 (董家里)			
102.5	5.1	Rakch'ŏn	락천 (落川)	Sambang	삼방 (三防)	Rakchon station
106.4	3.9	Sambang	삼방 (三防)	Sambanghyŏp	삼방협 (三防峽)	
114.1	7.7	Sep'o Ch'ŏngnyŏn	세포청년 (洗浦靑年)	Sep'o	세포 (洗浦)	Ch. Ich'ŏn Line
121.3	7.2	Sŏngsan	성산 (城山)			
126.3	5.0	Kŏmbullang	검불랑 (劍拂浪)			
131.1	4.8	Ri'mok	리목 (梨木)			
142.0	10.9	Pokkye	복계 (福溪)			
145.8	3.8	P'yŏnggang	평강 (平康)			
Section past P'yŏnggang closed
~~152.6~~	~~6.8~~	Kagok	가곡 (佳谷)			Closed
Demilitarized Zone
~~162.6~~	~~10.0~~	Woljŏngri	월정리 (月井里)			Closed
~~167.6~~	~~5.0~~	Ch'ŏrwŏn	철원 (鐵原)			Closed (Kŭmgangsan Line)
Section south of Sintalli in use by Korail; in DPRK before the Korean War
176.9	9.3	Sintalli	신탄리 (新炭里)			
181.3	4.4	Taegwangri	대광리 (大光里)			
191.9	10.3	Ryŏnch'ŏn	련천 (漣川)			
200.5	8.6	Chŏn'gok	전곡 (全谷)			
203.0	2.5	Hant'an'gang	한탄강 (漢灘江)			Prior to the Korean War, this was the terminus of the northern line. Reopened by KNR in 1975.
206.0	3.0	Ch'osŏngri	초성리 (哨城里)			Korail Gyeongwon Line; Originally opened 5 October 1950 as a UN munitions facility.

=== Wŏnsan Hwamul Branch ===
This is a short electrified branch to Wŏnsan Hwamul (Freight) Station, which is adjacent to the Kŭmgang Prime Mover Factory in Kalma-dong; the station has several tracks dedicated to serving the factory.

Distance (km)		Station Name		
Total	S2S	Transcribed	Chosŏn'gŭl (Hanja)	Connections
0.0	0.0	Wŏnsan	원산 (元山)	Kangwŏn Line
		Wŏnsan Hwamul	원산화물 (元山貨物)	
