= Gyeongwon Line =

Railway line in South Korea

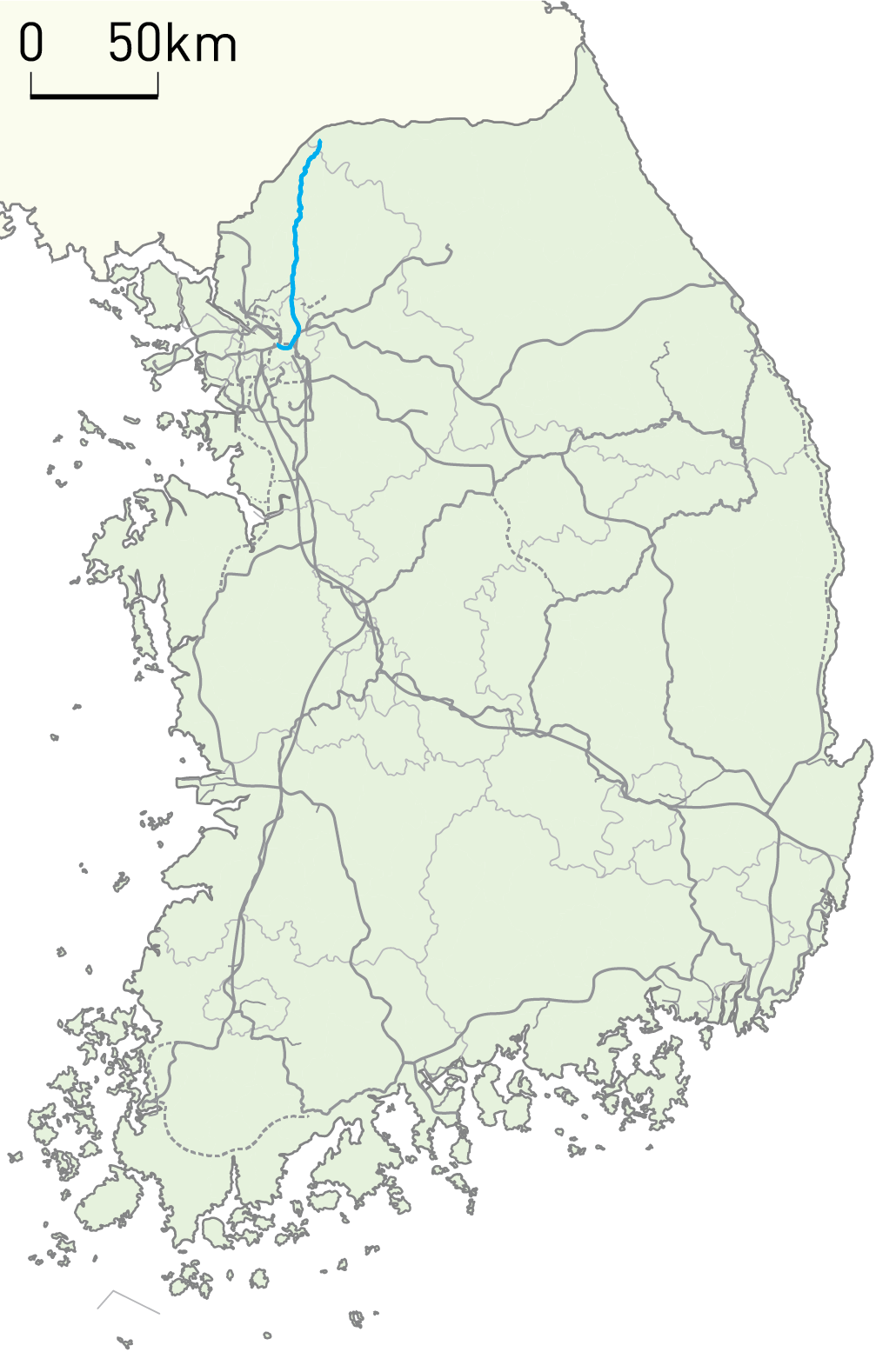

Overview
- Native name: 경원선 (京元線)
- Status: Operational
- Owner: Korea Rail Network Authority
- Locale: Seoul; Gyeonggi; Gangwon
- Termini: Yongsan; Baengmagoji
- Stations: 37

Service
- Type: Heavy rail, Passenger/Freight; Regional rail, Commuter rail
- Operator: Korail

History
- Opened: Stages between 1911 and 1914

Technical
- Line length: 94.4 km (58.7 mi)
- Number of tracks: Double track (Yongsan–Dongducheon); Single track
- Track gauge: 1,435 mm (4 ft 8 1/2 in) standard gauge
- Electrification: 25 kV/60 Hz AC Catenary (Yongsan–Yeoncheon)

- Gyeongwon Line
- Hangul: 경원선
- Hanja: 京元線
- RR: Gyeongwonseon
- MR: Kyŏngwŏnsŏn

The Gyeongwon Line is a railway line serving northeastern Gyeonggi Province in South Korea. The line is operated by Korail. The name of the line came from Gyeongseong (Seoul) and Wonsan, the original terminus of the line, in what is now North Korea.

== History ==
One of the first construction projects undertaken by the Railway Bureau of the Government General of Korea was for an east−west trunk line to connect Keijō to the important port of Wonsan. The Chosen Government Railway (Sentetsu) opened the line in several stages between 1911 and 1914. The first section of mainline to be electrified by Sentetsu was also along the Gyeongwon Line, with the Pokkye−Gosan section being energised on 27 March 1944, as part of a plan made jointly with the South Manchuria Railway for an electrified railway all the way from Busan to Xinjing, capital of Manchukuo.

After the partition of Korea following the end of the Pacific War in 1945, the Gyeongwon Line was split along the 38th parallel between the stations of Hantangang and Choseongni. The railways in both South and North were nationalised, and the newly-established Korean National Railroad took over operation of the truncated Gyeongwon Line, from Seoul to Choseongni; in the North, the Korean State Railway merged its section of the Gyeongwon Line, Choseong-ri−Wonsan, with the Wonsan−Gowon section of the former Hamgyeong Line to create the Gangwon Line.

The line was severely damaged during the Korean War. After the ceasefire and the subsequent establishment of the Military Demarcation Line, the division of the line changed, with the South gaining control of the line further northwards as far as Woljeongni. However, the line was rebuilt only as far as Sintalli, resulting in an operation line from Yongsan and Sintalli with a length of 88.8 km (55.2 mi).

Following the 1961 coup, the Supreme Council for National Reconstruction started South Korea's first five-year plan, which included a construction program to complete the railway network, to foster economic growth. As part of the program, in the outskirts of Seoul, a 4.9 km (3.0 mi) long avoiding line was built from Kwangwoon University to Mangu on the Jungang Line, called the Mangu Line, which opened on December 30, 1963.

=== Upgrade ===
The section of the Gyeongwon Line in the Seoul metropolitan area was among the first to be electrified with the 25 kV/60 Hz AC catenary system in South Korea when to allow for through train services with Seoul Subway Line 1. Further sections were electrified and urban services to Line 1 was extended in the 1980s and then in the 2000s:

Section	Length	Electrified rail operation commenced
Cheongnyangni–Kwangwoon Univ.	5.6 km	August 15, 1974
Yongsan–Cheongnyangni	12.6 km	December 9, 1978
Seongbuk–Chang-dong	3.6 km	April 25, 1985
Chang-dong–Uijeongbu	9.4 km	September 2, 1986
Uijeongbu–Ganeung then Uijeongbu Bukbu	1.2 km	October 5, 1987
Ganeung–Soyosan	23.2 km	December 15, 2006
Soyosan-Yeoncheon	20.87 km	December 16, 2023

Altogether 55.6 km (34.5 mi) of the line was electrified, and 53.1 km (33.0 mi) was double-tracked.

On September 1, 2010, the South Korean government announced a strategic plan to reduce travel times from Seoul to 95% of the country to under 2 hours by 2020. As part of the plan, the Gyeongwon Line is to be further upgraded until Uijeongbu for 230 km/h and may see KTX service.

In 2012 restoration of the line was completed between Sintan-ri and Baengmagoji.

On December 16, 2023, a single-line railway between Soyosan and Yeoncheon opened on the Seoul Metropolitan Subway Line 1.

== Route ==
A yellow background in the "Distance" box indicates that section of the line is not electrified.

Distance (km)	Interstation Distance (km)	Original Name	● Seoul Subway Line 1		Opened	Connections	Notes
Distance (km)	Interstation Distance (km)	Original Name	L	R	Opened	Connections	Notes
0.0	0.0	Yongsan 용산 (龍山)	Only Gyeongui–Jungang Line trains stop here. Line 1 trains use the Gyeongbu Line to Seoul Station, where it then continues via the Underground Subway Line 1 to Cheongnyangni.		15 October 1911	Gyeongbu Line; Yongsan Line ● Seoul Subway Line 1	
1.9	1.9	Ichon 이촌 (二村)	Only Gyeongui–Jungang Line trains stop here. Line 1 trains use the Gyeongbu Line to Seoul Station, where it then continues via the Underground Subway Line 1 to Cheongnyangni.		9 December 1978	● Seoul Subway Line 4	
3.6	1.7	Seobinggo 서빙고 (西氷庫)	Only Gyeongui–Jungang Line trains stop here. Line 1 trains use the Gyeongbu Line to Seoul Station, where it then continues via the Underground Subway Line 1 to Cheongnyangni.		1 October 1917		
~~7.7~~	~~4.1~~	~~Sucheolli~~; ~~수천리~~	Only Gyeongui–Jungang Line trains stop here. Line 1 trains use the Gyeongbu Line to Seoul Station, where it then continues via the Underground Subway Line 1 to Cheongnyangni.		15 October 1911		Closed 1944
5.5	1.9	Hannam 한남 (漢南)	Only Gyeongui–Jungang Line trains stop here. Line 1 trains use the Gyeongbu Line to Seoul Station, where it then continues via the Underground Subway Line 1 to Cheongnyangni.		1 April 1980		
7.1	1.6	Oksu 옥수 (玉水)	Only Gyeongui–Jungang Line trains stop here. Line 1 trains use the Gyeongbu Line to Seoul Station, where it then continues via the Underground Subway Line 1 to Cheongnyangni.		9 September 1978	● Seoul Subway Line 3	
8.9	1.8	Eungbong 응봉 (鷹峰)	Only Gyeongui–Jungang Line trains stop here. Line 1 trains use the Gyeongbu Line to Seoul Station, where it then continues via the Underground Subway Line 1 to Cheongnyangni.		9 September 1978		Formerly Seongsu 성수 (聖水) renamed 10 July 1980
10.4	2.7	Wangsimni 왕십리 (往十里)	Only Gyeongui–Jungang Line trains stop here. Line 1 trains use the Gyeongbu Line to Seoul Station, where it then continues via the Underground Subway Line 1 to Cheongnyangni.		15 October 1911	● Seoul Subway Line 2 ● Seoul Subway Line 5 ● Suin–Bundang Line	
12.7	2.4	Cheongnyangni 청량리 (淸凉里)	●	●	15 October 1911	Jungang Line ● Seoul Subway Line 1 ● Gyeongchun Line	
14.1	1.4	Hoegi 회기 (回基)	●	●	1 April 1980	● Gyeongchun Line ● Gyeongui–Jungang Line	
14.9	0.8	Hankuk Univ. of Foreign Studies 외대앞 (外大앞)	●	●	15 August 1974		Formerly Hwigyeong 휘경 (徽慶) renamed 1 January 1996
15.7	0.8	Sinimun 신이문 (新里門)	●	●	5 January 1980		
17.1	1.4	Seokgye 석계 (石溪)	●	●	14 January 1985	● Seoul Subway Line 6	
18.2	5.5	Kwangwoon Univ. 광운대 (光云大)	●	●	25 July 1939	current and former Gyeongchun Lines	Was Yeonchon 연촌 (硯村) until May 3, 1963 where it was renamed to Seongbuk (城北) and renamed to current name February 25, 2013
19.3	1.1	Wolgye 월계 (月溪)	●	｜	22 August 1985		
20.7	1.4	Nokcheon 녹천 (鹿川)	●	｜	22 August 1985		
21.7	1.0	Chang-dong 창동 (倉洞)	●	●	15 October 1911	● Seoul Subway Line 4	
23.4	1.7	Banghak 방학 (放鶴)	●	｜	2 September 1986		
24.7	1.3	Dobong 도봉 (道峰)	●	｜	2 September 1986		
25.9	1.2	Dobongsan 도봉산 (道峰山)	●	●	2 September 1986	● Seoul Subway Line 7	Formerly Nuwon 누원 (樓阮) renamed 1 January 1988
28.2	2.3	Mangwolsa 망월사 (望月寺)	●	｜	21 June 1966		
29.6	1.4	Hoeryong 회룡 (回龍)	●	●	2 September 1986	● U Line	
31.2	1.6	Uijeongbu 의정부 (議政府)	●	●	15 October 1911		
32.4	1.2	Ganeung 가능 (佳陵)	●	｜	5 October 1987		Formerly Uijeongbu Bukbu 의정부북부 (議政府北部) renamed 15 December 2006
33.7	3.1	Nogyang 녹양 (綠楊)	●	｜	15 December 2006		
35.3	1.6	Yangju 양주 (楊州)	●	●	25 December 1948		Formerly Junae 주내 (州內) renamed 28 December 2007
37.5	2.2	Majeon Signal Area 마전신호장 (麻田信号場)	｜	｜	15 December 2006		
40.6	5.3	Deokgye 덕계 (德溪)	●	｜	15 December 2006		
43.5	2.9	Deokjeong 덕정 (德亭)	●	●	15 October 1911		
49.1	5.6	Jihaeng 지행 (紙杏)	●	●	30 January 2005		
50.1	1.0	Dongducheon Jungang 동두천중앙 (東豆川中央)	●	●	1 February 1955		Was Eosu-dong 어수동 (御水洞) until October 2, 1984 where it was renamed to Dongducheon 동두천 (東豆川) and renamed to current name on December 15, 2006
51.5	1.4	Bosan 보산 (保山)	●	｜	15 December 2006		
53.1	1.6	Dongducheon 동두천 (東豆川)	●	●	25 July 1912		Dongducheon 동두천 (東豆川) until October 2, 1984 where it was renamed to Dong-an 동안 (東安) and renamed to current name on December 15, 2006
55.5	2.4	Soyosan 소요산 (逍遙山)	●	○	11 January 1976		
61.3	5.8	Cheongsan 청산 (靑山)	●	｜	10 September 1953		Originally opened 5 October 1950 as a UN munitions facility. Formerly named Choseong-ri until 21 November 2023.
~~62.7~~	~~3.0~~	~~Hantangang~~; ~~한탄강 (漢灘江)~~			28 June 1975		In DPRK until 1953. Reopened 1975, permanently closed 21 November 2023.
64.6	3.3	Jeongok 전곡 (全谷)	●	｜	25 July 1912		In DPRK to 1953
73.3	8.7	Yeoncheon 연천 (漣川)	●	｜	25 July 1912		In DPRK to 1953
77.3	4.0	Sinmang-ri 신망리 (新望里)			21 August 1956		
84.3	7.0	Daegwang-ri 대광리 (大光里)			21 October 1912		In DPRK to 1953
88.7	4.4	Sintan-ri 신탄리 (新炭里)			10 July 1913		In DPRK to 1953
94.3	5.6	Baengmagoji 백마고지 (白馬高地)			20 November 2012		
Section north of Baengmagoji closed							
~~98.1~~	~~3.7~~	~~Cheorwon~~; ~~철원 (鉄原)~~			21 October 1912	former Geumgangsan Line	In DPRK to 1953. Closed.
~~103.1~~	~~5.0~~	~~Woljeong-ri~~; ~~월정리 (月井里)~~			10 July 1913		In DPRK to 1953. Closed. Since restored as a museum.
Demilitarized Zone							
~~113.1~~	~~10.0~~	~~Gagok 가곡 (佳谷)~~					In DPRK. Closed.
Section north of Pyeonggang part of Korean State Railway's Kangwon Line							
119.9	6.8	Pyeonggang 평강 (平康)					Kangwon Line

== See also ==
- Korail
- Korean State Railway
- Transportation in South Korea

== Bibliography ==
- Japanese Government Railways (1937), 鉄道停車場一覧. 昭和12年10月1日現在(The List of the Stations as of 1 October 1937), Kawaguchi Printing Company, Tokyo, pp 495–496
