= Pyonggang station =

Railway station in North Korea

P'yŏnggang 평강

Korean name
- Hangul: 평강역
- Hanja: 平康驛
- Revised Romanization: Pyeonggang-yeok
- McCune–Reischauer: P'yŏnggang-yŏk

General information
- Location: P'yŏnggang-ŭp, P'yŏnggang, Kangwŏn; North Korea
- Coordinates: 38.4111°N 127.2891°E
- Owner: Korean State Railway

History
- Opened: 16 August 1914

Services
Preceding station	Korean State Railway	Following station
Pokkye towards Kowŏn	Kangwŏn Line	Terminus
Location

P'yŏnggang station is a railway station in P'yŏnggang-ŭp, P'yŏnggang county, Kangwŏn province, North Korea, on the Kangwŏn Line of the Korean State Railway. It is the terminus station of this line, although prior to the Korean War, the railway continued on to Sintal-li, which is nowadays the northern terminus of the Kyŏngwŏn Line in South Korea.

The station, along with the rest of the former Kyŏngwŏn Line, was opened by the Japanese on 16 August 1914.
