= Kowon station =

Railway station in North Korea

Coordinates: 39°26′24″N 127°14′58″E

Kowŏn 고원

Korean name
- Hangul: 고원역
- Hanja: 高原驛
- Revised Romanization: Kowon-yeok
- McCune–Reischauer: Kowŏn-yŏk

General information
- Location: Kowŏn-ŭp, Kowŏn, South Hamgyŏng; North Korea
- Owner: Korean State Railway

History
- Opened: 21 September 1916

Services
Preceding station	Korean State Railway	Following station
Puraesan towards P'yŏngyang	P'yŏngra Line	Hyŏnhŭng towards Rajin
Terminus	Kangwŏn Line	Chŏnt'an towards P'yŏnggang
Location

Kowŏn station is a railway station of the Korean State Railway in Kowŏn-ŭp, Kowŏn County, South Hamgyŏng, North Korea. It is the junction where the P'yŏngra Line, which connects P'yŏngyang to Rajin, meets the Kangwŏn Line running from Kowŏn to P'yŏnggang.

== History ==
Kowŏn station, along with the rest of the Okp'yŏng–Kowŏn–Kŭmya section of the former Hamgyong Line, was opened by the Japanese on 21 September 1916.
