= Kangwon Province, North Korea =

Province of North Korea

Coordinates: 39°08′51″N 127°26′46″E

Kangwon Province 강원도
- Province

Korean transcription(s)
  - Chosŏn'gŭl: 강원도
  - Hancha: 江原道
  - McCune–Reischauer: Kangwŏndo
  - Revised Romanization: Gangwon-do
- Country: North Korea
- Region: Gwandong (Yeongseo: western Kangwŏn; Yeongdong: eastern Kangwŏn)
- Capital: Wŏnsan
- Subdivisions: 2 cities; 15 counties

Government
  - Provincial Party Committee Chief Secretary: Baek Seong-guk (WPK)
  - Provincial People's Committee Chairman: Ju Mun Jin

Area
  - Total: 11,255 km^{2} (4,346 sq mi)

Population (2008)
  - Total: 1,477,582
  - Density: 131.28/km^{2} (340.02/sq mi)
- Time zone: UTC+9 (Pyongyang Time)
- ISO 3166 code: KP-07

Kangwon Province (Kangwŏndo; Korean pronunciation: [kaŋ.wʌn.do]) is a province of North Korea, with its capital at Wonsan. Before the division of Korea in 1945, Kangwŏn Province and its South Korean neighbour Gangwon Province (also spelled Kangwon Province sometimes) formed a single province that excluded Wŏnsan.

== History ==
Kangwŏn was one of the Eight Provinces of Korea during the Joseon Dynasty. The province was formed 1395, and derived its name from the names of the principal cities of Gangneung (or Kangnŭng; Korean: 강릉; Hanja: 江陵) and the provincial capital Wonju (or Wŏnju; 원주; 原州).

In 1895, Kangwŏn was replaced by the Districts of Chuncheon (Chuncheon-bu; 춘천부; 春川府) in the west and Gangneung (Gangneung-bu; 강릉부; 江陵府) in the east. Wonju became part of Chungju District. During 1910–1945 Japanese colonial period in Korea, the province was known as Kōgen-dō.

In 1896, Korea was redivided into thirteen provinces, and the two districts were merged to re-form Kangwŏn Province. Although Wonju rejoined Kangwŏn province, the provincial capital was moved to Chuncheon.

In 1945, Kangwŏn Province (along with the rest of Korea) was divided by the 38th parallel north in 1945 into Soviet and American zones of occupation in the north and south respectively. In 1946, the northern province was expanded to include the North Korean portion of Gyeonggi Province and the area around Wŏnsan in South Hamgyŏng Province. The provincial capital of the North Korean portion of the province was established at Wŏnsan, as Kangwŏn's traditional capitals Wonju and Chuncheon both were south of the 38th parallel. In 1948, the province became part of the new Democratic People's Republic of Korea. As a result of the Korean War Armistice Agreement of 1953, the boundary between the North and South Korean portions of the province was shifted northward to the Military Demarcation Line.

In 2002, Mount Kumgang Tourist Region was split off from the rest of the province to form a separately-administered region. However, in January 2024, after asserting unification as impossible and declaring South Korea a hostile state, North Korea announced that they would close the Mount Kumgang International Tourism Administration.

== Geography ==
The province is bordered by South Hamgyŏng to the north, South P'yŏngan and North Hwanghae to the west, and Kaesŏng to the south. Additionally, the province is across the Korean Demilitarized Zone from its South Korean counterpart Gangwon and Gyeonggi. To the east is the Sea of Japan.

The province is dominated by the T'aebaek Mountains, the highest peak of which is Mount Kumgang ("Diamond Mountain").

Kangwŏn and Gangwon Provinces are together referred to as the Gwandong region. The region west of the Taebaek Mountains is called Yŏngsŏ, while the region east of the mountains is called Yŏngdong.

In April 2003, the Mt. Chuae Plant Reserve was created. The reserve is 687 hectares and is in Shindong-ri, Sepho County, and Sanyang-ri, Kosan County. Mt. Chuae is 1,528 meters above sea level and is part of the Masingnyong Mountains. The North Korean Nature Conservation Union is trying to preserve mixed forests of pine and broad-leaf trees. The North's cabinet-level decision has banned animal grazing and collecting plant resources and other acts of damaging the environment.

== Administrative divisions ==
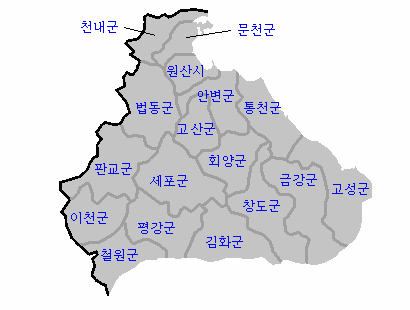
Labeled map of divisions of North Korean Kangwon province (in Korean)

Kangwŏn Province is divided into two cities (si), one special administrative region, and 15 counties (kun).

=== Cities ===
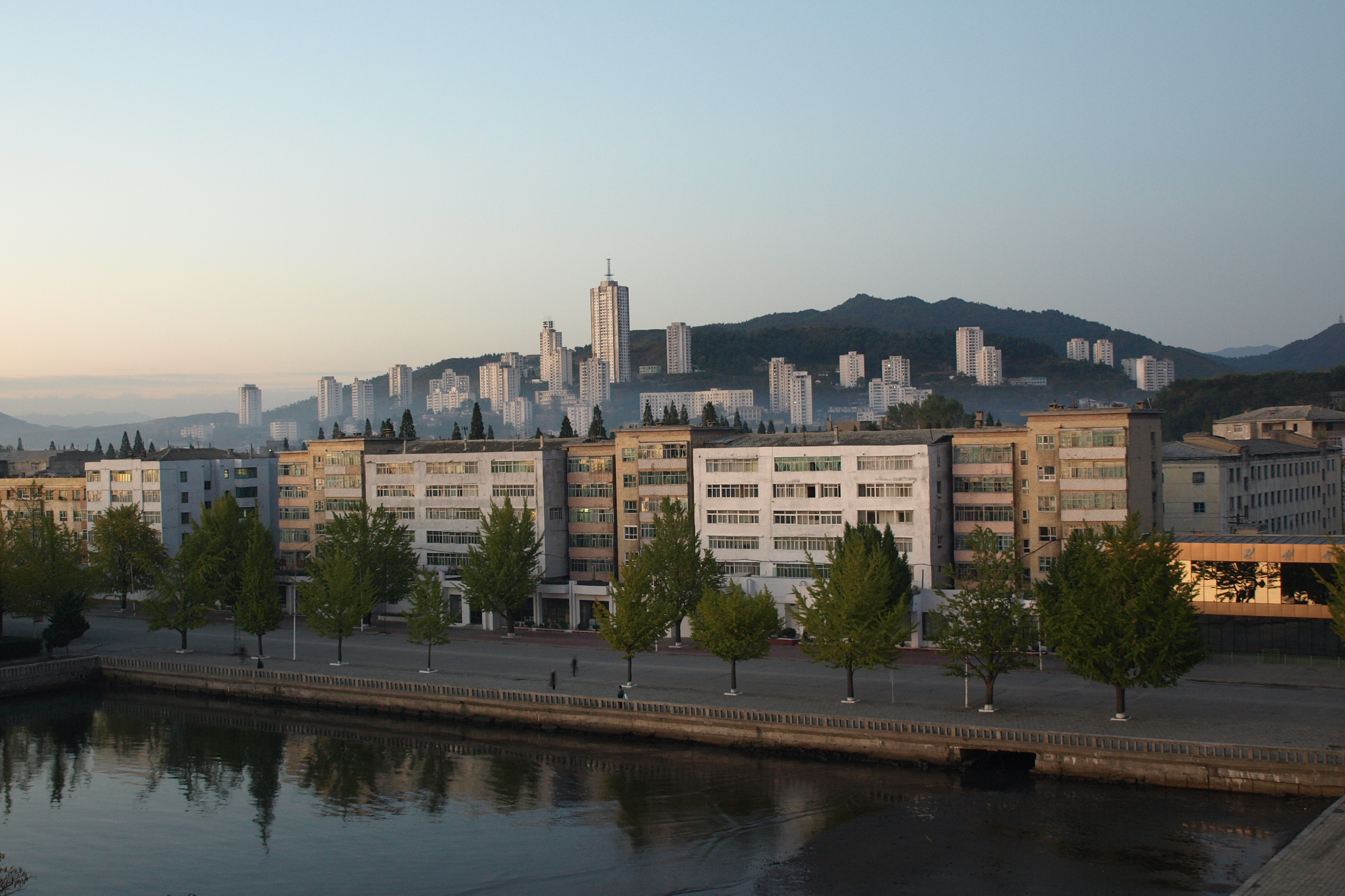
Wonsan

- Munch'ŏn-si (문천시; 文川市)
- Wŏnsan-si (원산시; 元山市)

=== Counties ===
- Anbyŏn-gun (안변군; 安邊郡)
- Ch'angdo-gun (창도군; 昌道郡)
- Ch'ŏnnae-gun (천내군; 川內郡)
- Ch'ŏrwŏn-gun (철원군; 鐵原郡)
- Hoeyang-gun (회양군; 淮陽郡)
- Ich'ŏn-gun (이천군; 伊川郡)
- Kimhwa-gun (김화군; 金化郡)
- Kosan-gun (고산군; 高山郡)
- Kosŏng-gun (고성군; 高城郡)
- Kŭmgang-gun (금강군; 金剛郡)
  - Mount Kumgang Tourist Region (금강산 관광 지구; 金剛山觀光地區)
- P'an'gyo-gun (판교군; 板橋郡)
- Pŏptong-gun (법동군; 法洞郡)
- P'yŏnggang-gun (평강군; 平康郡)
- Sep'o-gun (세포군; 洗浦郡)
- T'ongch'ŏn-gun (통천군; 通川郡)
