= Deokgye station =

Seoul subway station

덕계; Deokgye
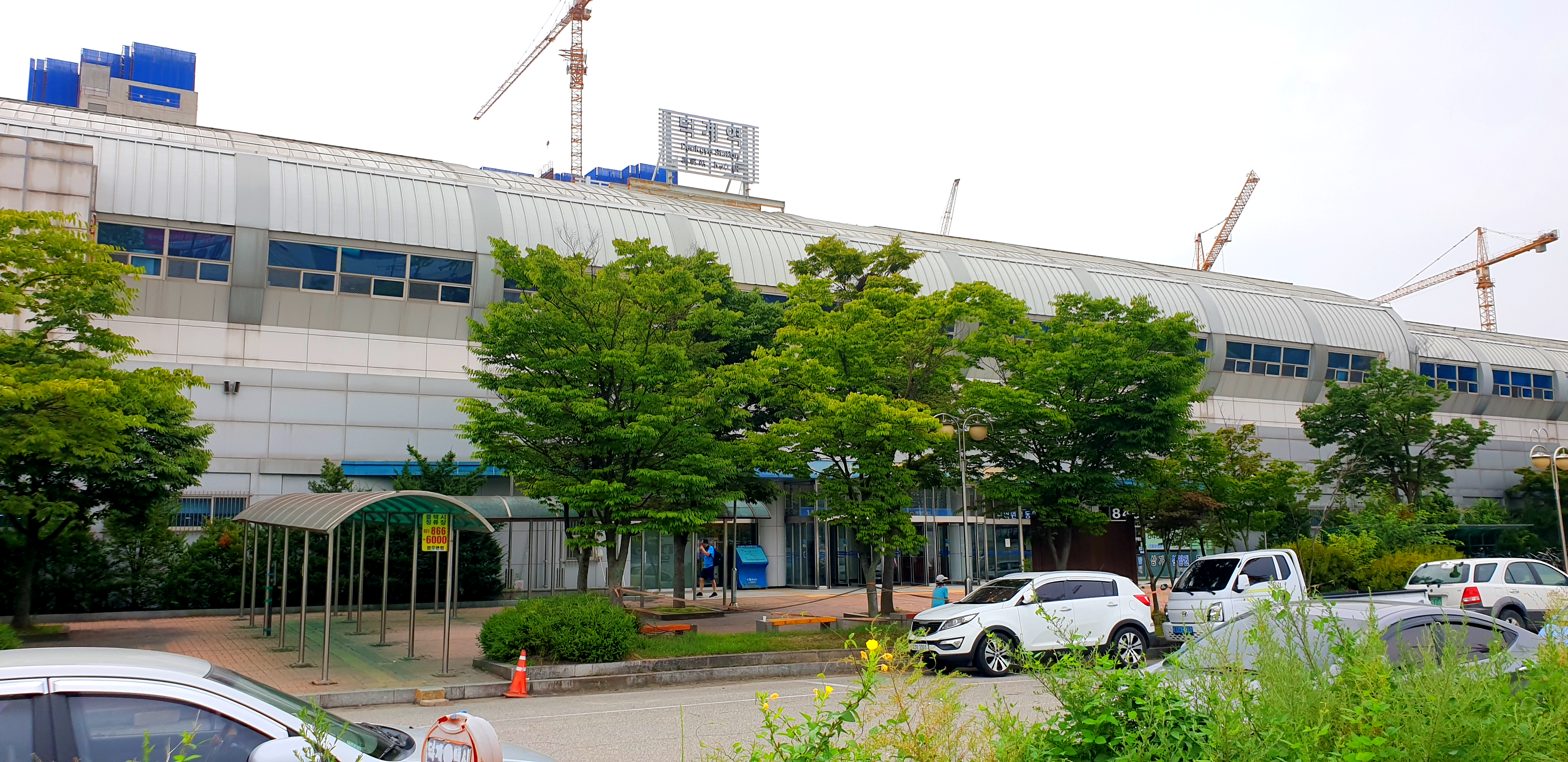
- Station Building (Exit 1)

Korean name
- Hangul: 덕계역
- Hanja: 德溪驛
- Revised Romanization: Deokgye-yeok
- McCune–Reischauer: Tŏkkye-yŏk

General information
- Location: 267-1 Deokgye-dong, 317 Godeok-ro 139beon-gil, Yangju-si, Gyeonggi-do; South Korea
- Coordinates: 37°49′08″N 127°03′23″E
- Operator: Korail
- Line: Gyeongwon Line
- Platforms: 2
- Tracks: 2

Construction
- Structure type: Aboveground

History
- Opened: December 28, 2007

Passengers
- Based on Jan-Dec of 2012. Line 1: 4,347

Services
Preceding station	Seoul Metropolitan Subway	Following station
Deokjeong towards Soyosan	Line 1	Yangju towards Incheon
Deokjeong towards Dongducheon	Line 1 Gyeongwon Express	Yangju towards Incheon
Location

Deokgye station is a train station on Line 1 of the Seoul Subway. It opened in December 2007.

== Platforms ==
- Platform 1: to Ganeung / Seoul Station / Incheon
- Platform 2: to Soyosan / Dongducheon

== Exits ==
- Exit 1: Deokgye Middle School, Toksan Elementary School, Tokkye Elementary School, Deokgye High School, Deokgye Protection Center
- Exit 2: Dodoon Elementary School
