= Deokjeong station =

Train station in South Korea

덕정 (서정대학교); Deokjeong (Seojeong Univ.)
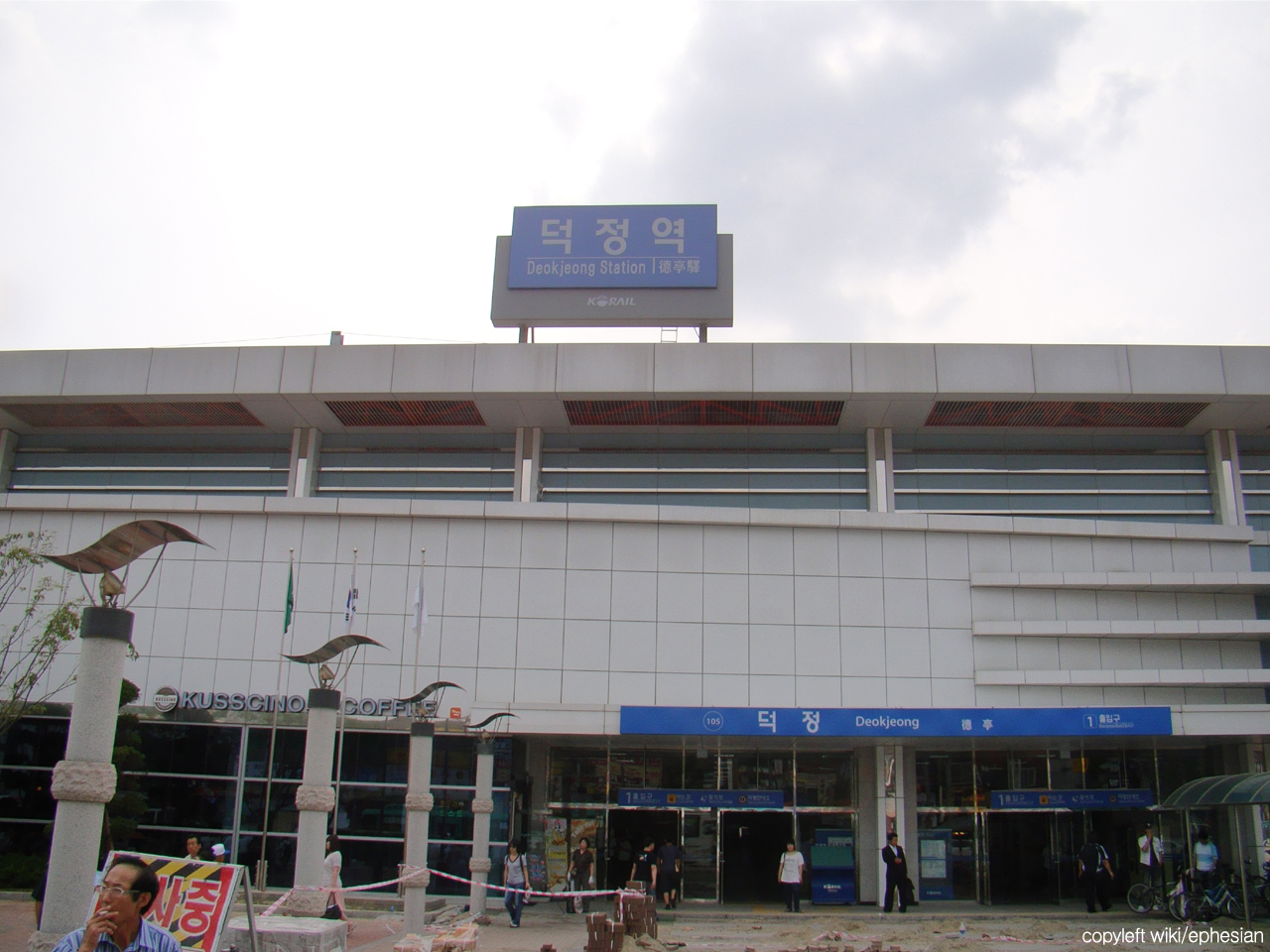

Korean name
- Hangul: 덕정역
- Hanja: 德亭驛
- Revised Romanization: Deokjeong-yeok
- McCune–Reischauer: Tŏkchŏng-yŏk

General information
- Location: 350-242 Deokjeong-dong, 1356 Hwahamno, Yangju-si, Gyeonggi-do; South Korea
- Coordinates: 37°50′40″N 127°03′41″E
- Operator: Korail
- Line: Gyeongwon Line
- Platforms: 2
- Tracks: 4

Construction
- Structure type: Aboveground

History
- Opened: October 15, 1911; December 15, 2006

Passengers
- Based on Jan-Dec of 2012. Line 1: 14,139

Services
Preceding station	Seoul Metropolitan Subway	Following station
Jihaeng towards Soyosan	Line 1	Deokgye towards Incheon
Jihaeng towards Dongducheon	Line 1 Gyeongwon Express	Deokgye towards Incheon
Location

Deokjeong station is a station in Seoul Subway Line 1. On October 15, 1911, the service started. In 2006, it started to operate the metropolitan train.

== Platforms ==
- Platform 1: to Hoegi (Rapid Line)
- Platform 2: to Uijeongbu / Cheongnyangni / Seoul Station / Guro / Incheon
- Platform 3: to Soyosan / Dongducheon
- Platform 4: to Dongducheon (Rapid Line)

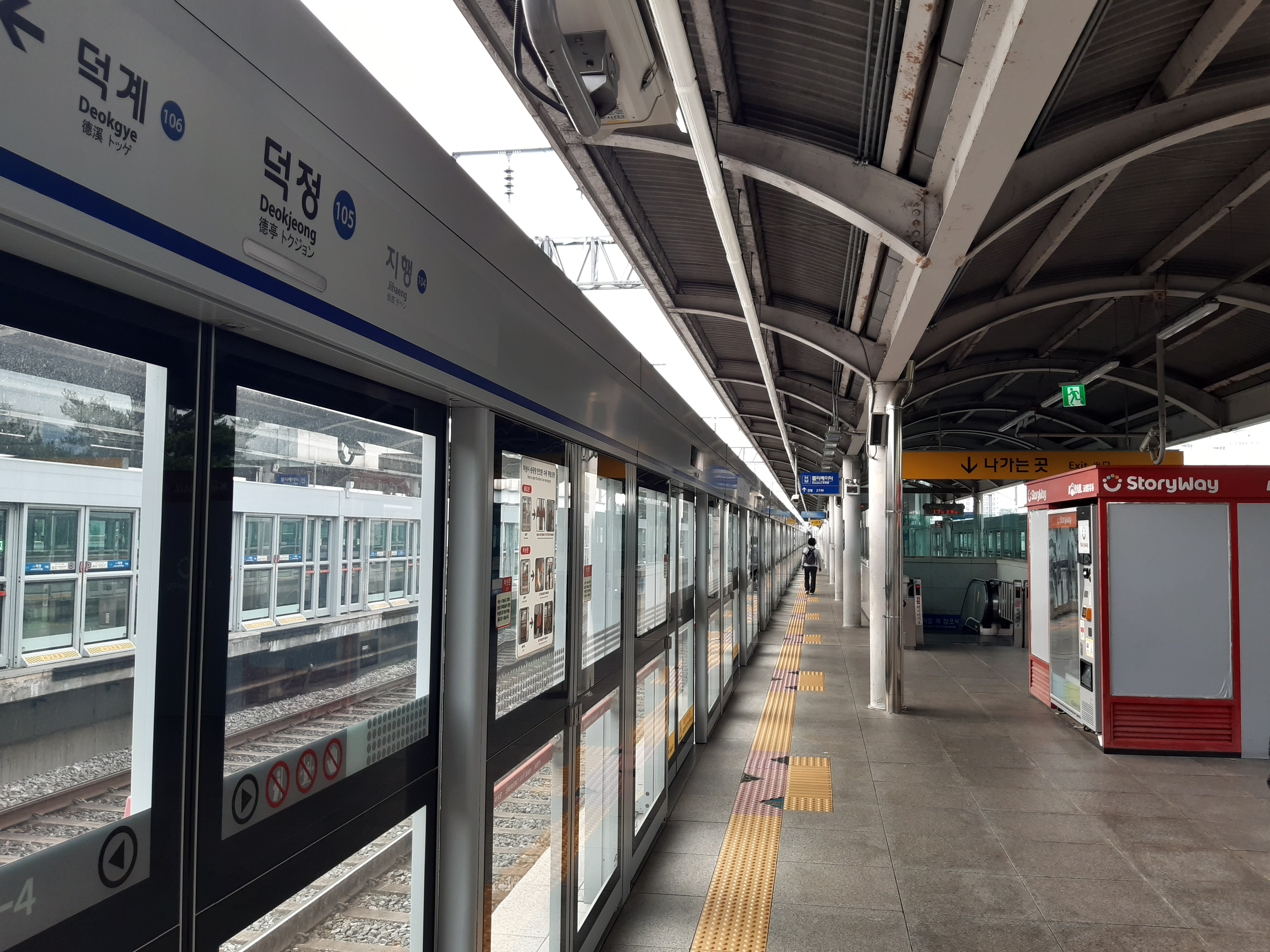

== Exits ==
- Exit 1: Deogjeong Elementary School (덕정초등학교, deog-jeong-cho-deung-hag-gyo, Deokjeong Post Office (덕정 우체국, deog-jeong-oo-che-goog), Deokjeong Middle School (덕정 중학교, deog-jeong-joong-hag-gyo), Deokjeong Protection Center (덕정 보호센타, deog-jeong-bo-ho-sen-ta), Hoecheon 1-dong Community Center (회천 1동 커뮤니티 센타, hoe-cheon-il-dong keo-myu-ni-ti-sen-ta), Deokjeong Sarang Church (덕정 사랑교회, deog-jeong-sa-rang-gyo-hwe)
