= Jihaeng station =

Train station in South Korea

지행; Jihaeng
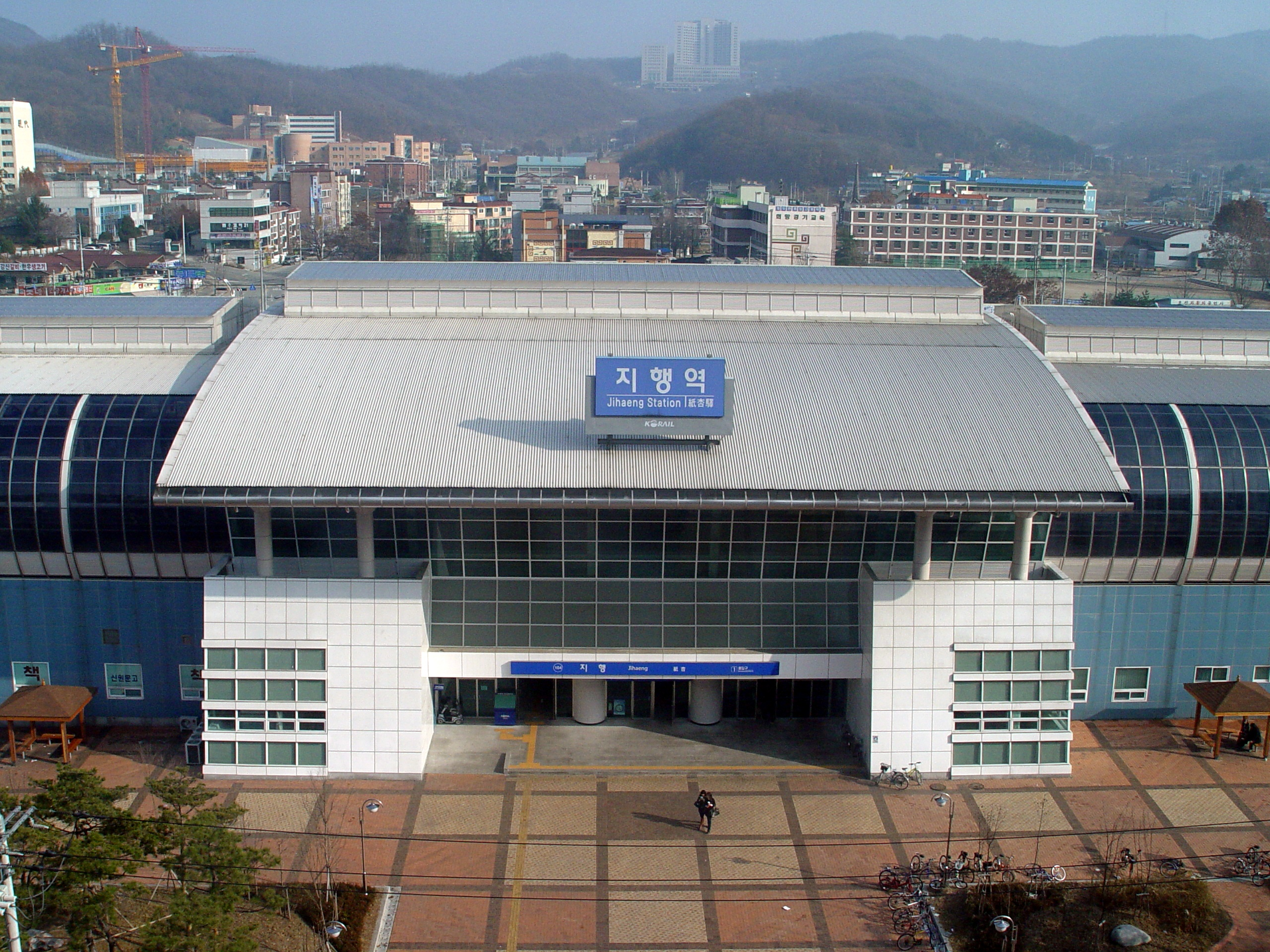

Korean name
- Hangul: 지행역
- Hanja: 紙杏驛
- Revised Romanization: Jihaeng-yeok
- McCune–Reischauer: Chihaeng-yŏk

General information
- Location: 424-1 Jihaeng-dong, 2285 Pyeonghwa-ro, Dongducheon-si, Gyeonggi Province; South Korea
- Coordinates: 37°53′32″N 127°03′20″E
- Operator: Korail
- Line: Gyeongwon Line
- Platforms: 2
- Tracks: 4

Construction
- Structure type: Aboveground

History
- Opened: January 30, 2005; December 15, 2006

Passengers
- Based on Jan-Dec of 2012. Line 1: 14,540

Services
Preceding station	Seoul Metropolitan Subway	Following station
Dongducheon Jungang towards Soyosan	Line 1	Deokjeong towards Incheon
Dongducheon Jungang towards Dongducheon	Line 1 Gyeongwon Express	Deokjeong towards Incheon
Location

Jihaeng station is a ground-level metro station on Line 1 of the Seoul Subway in Jihaeng-dong, Dongducheon, South Korea. It opened on January 30, 2005, to services on the Gyeongwon Line and services on the Seoul Metropolitan Subway began calling here on December 15, 2006. The station offers access to Dongducheon Foreign Language High School, Central Middle and High School, Jihaeng Elementary School, Science Tower and Songnae-dong Office, among other places.

== Platforms ==
- Platform 1: to Ganeung / Seoul Station / Incheon
- Platform 2: to Ganeung / Seoul Station / Incheon
- Platform 3: to Soyosan / Dongducheon
- Platform 4: to Soyosan / Dongducheon

== Exits ==
- Exit 1: Idan Elementary School, Dongducheon Office of Education, Dongducheon Fire Station
- Exit 2: Jihaeng Post Office, Saengyeon Middle School
- Exit 3: Dongducheon Registry Office, Dongducheon Foreign Language High School
- Exit 4: Jihaeng Elementary School, Korea Electric Power Corporation, Dongduchon Jungang High School, Songnae Jungang Middle School
