= Yangju station =

Station of the Seoul Metropolitan Subway

양주 (경동대); Yangju (Kyungdong Univ.)
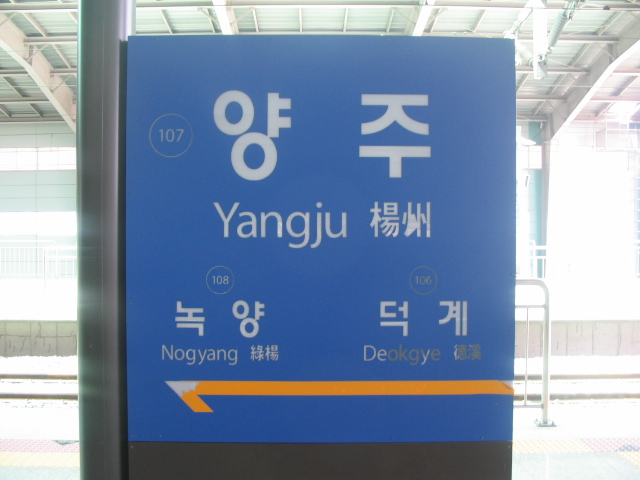
- Station nameplate

Korean name
- Hangul: 양주역
- Hanja: 楊州驛
- Revised Romanization: Yangju-yeok
- McCune–Reischauer: Yangju-yŏk

General information
- Other names: Junae
- Location: 118-1 Nambang-dong, 919 Pyeonghwa-ro, Yangju-si, Gyeonggi-do; South Korea
- Coordinates: 37°46′28″N 127°02′41″E
- Operator: Korail
- Line: Gyeongwon Line
- Platforms: 2
- Tracks: 4

Construction
- Structure type: Aboveground

History
- Opened: December 25, 1948; December 15, 2006

Passengers
- Based on Jan-Dec of 2012. Line 1: 17,992

Services
Preceding station	Seoul Metropolitan Subway	Following station
Deokgye towards Yeoncheon	Line 1	Nogyang towards Incheon
Deokgye towards Dongducheon	Line 1 Gyeongwon Express	Uijeongbu towards Incheon
Location

Yangju Station is a train station on Seoul Subway Line 1 and the Gyeongwon Line. The name comes from Yangju, the city where this station is located. Until December 2007, it was called Junae Station.

== Platforms ==
- Platform 1: to Ganeung / Seoul Station / Kwangwoon University / Incheon
- Platform 2: to Ganeung / Seoul Station / Kwangwoon University / Incheon
- Platform 3: to Soyosan / Dongducheon
- Platform 4: to Soyosan / Dongducheon

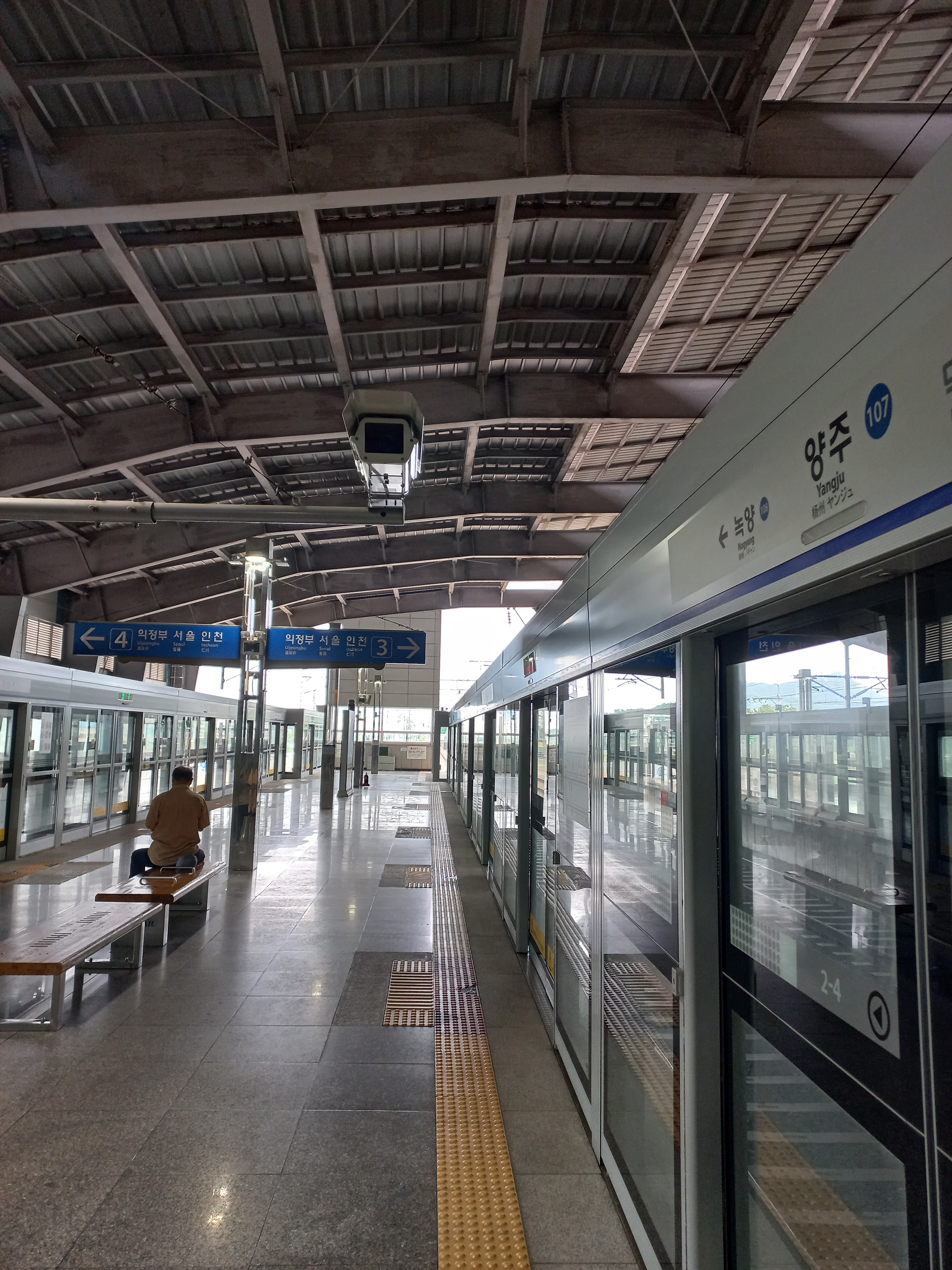

== Exits ==
- Exit 1: Junae Post Office, Yangju 1-dong Community Center, Nambang 1-ri Community Center
- Exit 2: Pyeonghwa-ro, Nambanggyo
