= Nogyang station =

Metro station in Uijeongbu, South Korea

녹양; Nogyang
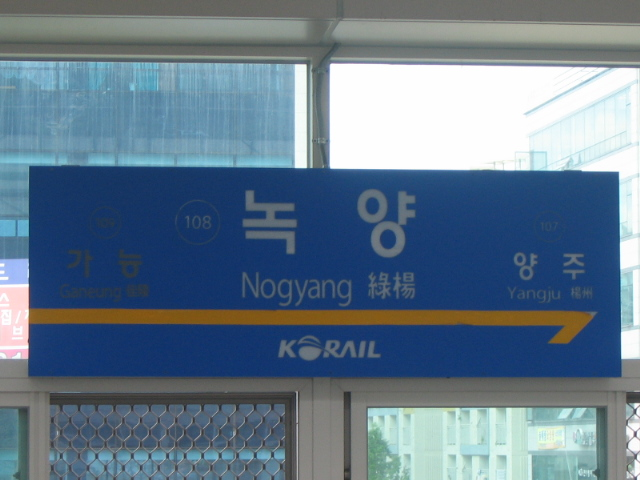

Korean name
- Hangul: 녹양역
- Hanja: 綠楊驛
- Revised Romanization: Nogyang-yeok
- McCune–Reischauer: Nogyang-yŏk

General information
- Location: 14-11 Nogyang-dong, 757 Pyeonghwa-ro, Uijeongbu-si, Gyeonggi-do; South Korea
- Coordinates: 37°45′32″N 127°02′31″E
- Operator: Korail
- Line: Gyeongwon Line
- Platforms: 2
- Tracks: 2

Construction
- Structure type: Aboveground

History
- Opened: December 15, 2006

Passengers
- Based on Jan-Dec of 2012. Line 1: 9,964

Services
Preceding station	Seoul Metropolitan Subway	Following station
Yangju towards Soyosan	Line 1	Ganeung towards Incheon
Location

Nogyang Station is a station on the Gyeongwon Line in South Korea. It is served by Seoul Subway Line 1. The station lies in the far northern end of Uijeongbu in Gyeonggi-do.

== Platforms ==
- Platform 1: to Ganeung / Seoul Station / Kwangwoon University / Incheon
- Platform 2: to Yangju / Dongducheon / Soyosan
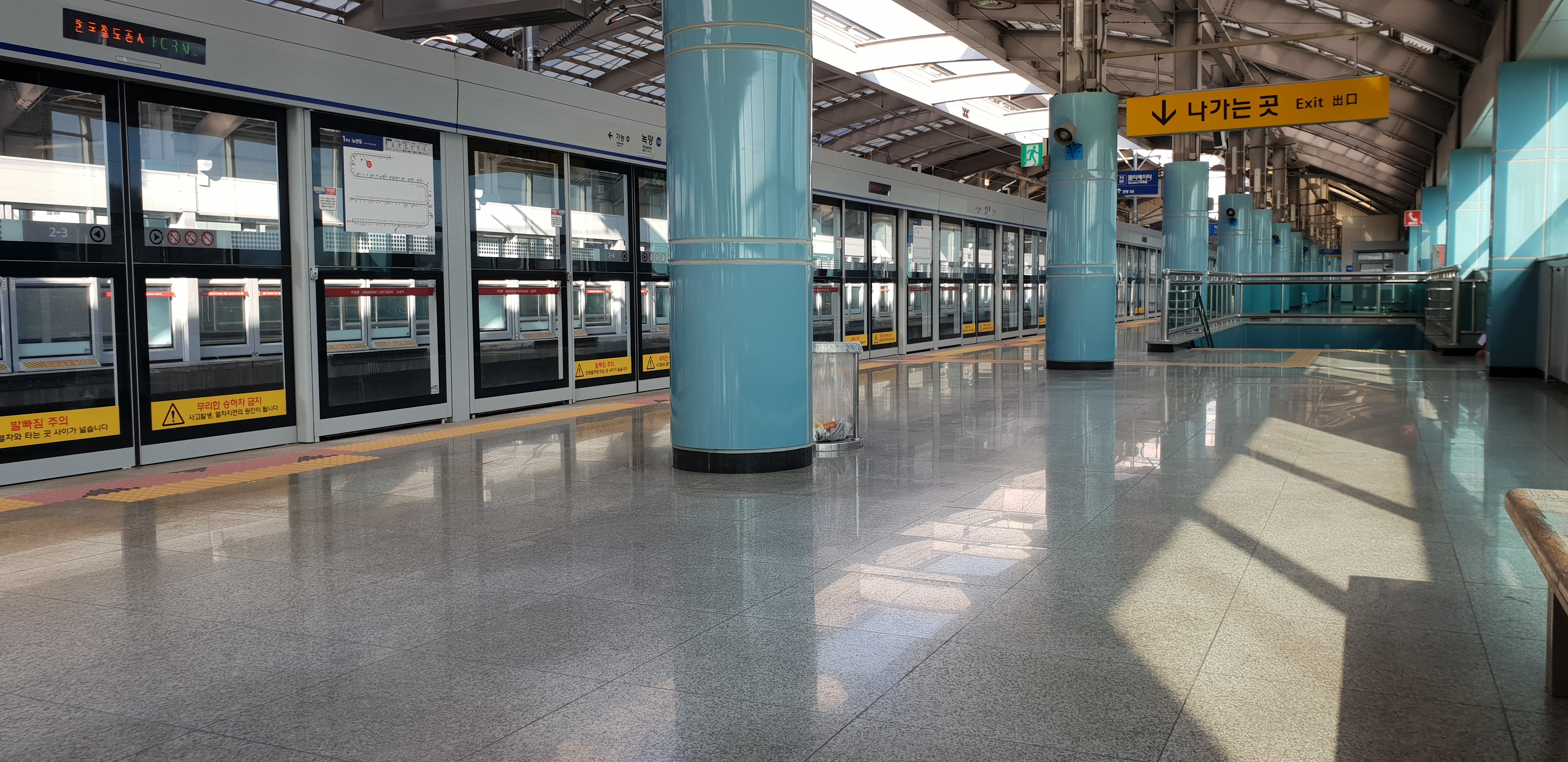

== Exits ==
- Exit 1: Nogyang-dong Community Center, Uijeongbu District Court, Uijeongbu District Public Prosecutor's Office, Uijeongbu Kwangdong High School
- Exit 2: Nogyang Park, Hadonggyo, Nogyangsageori, Pyeonghwa-ro

== The vicinity of the station ==
- Uijeongbu District Prosecutors' Office
- Uijeongbu Indoor Ice Rink
- Uijeongbu Gymnasium (Professional Volleyball V-League Men's Uijeongbu KB Insurance Stars Home Stadium)
- Uijeongbu Sports Complex
- Nokyang Elementary School
