= Bosan station =

Station of the Seoul Metropolitan Subway

| 보산; Bosan |
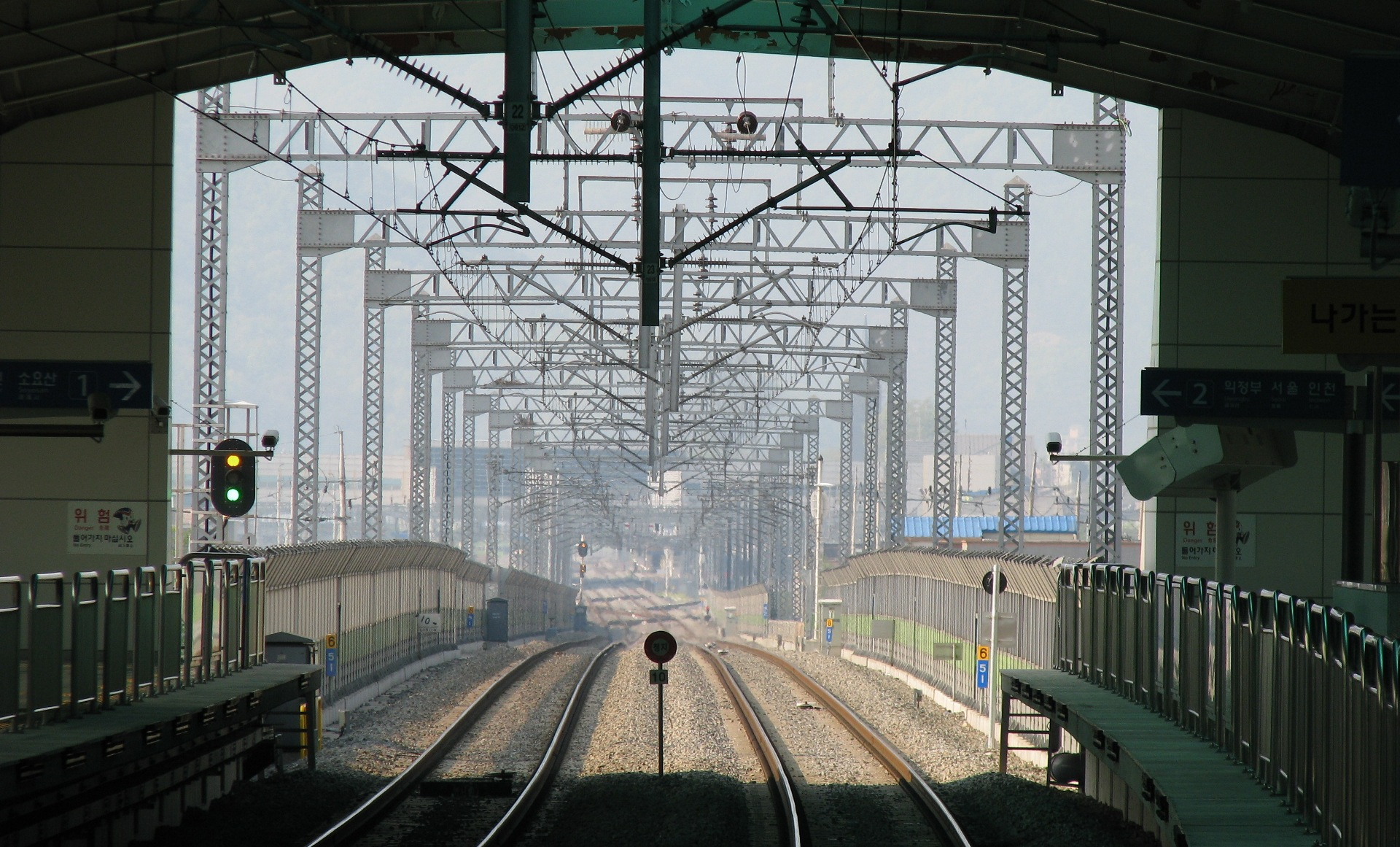

Korean name
- Hangul: 보산역
- Hanja: 保山驛
- Revised Romanization: Bosannyeok
- McCune–Reischauer: Posannyŏk

General information
- Location: 2539 Pyeonghwa-ro, Dongducheon-si, Gyeonggi-do; South Korea
- Coordinates: 37°54′49″N 127°03′26″E
- Operator: Korail
- Line: Gyeongwon Line
- Platforms: 2
- Tracks: 2

Construction
- Structure type: Aboveground

History
- Opened: December 15, 2006

Passengers
- Based on Jan-Dec of 2012. Line 1: 4,034

Services
| Preceding station | Seoul Metropolitan Subway | Following station |
|---|---|---|
| Dongducheon towards Soyosan | Line 1 | Dongducheon Jungang towards Incheon |
Location

Bosan station is a subway station located at Dongducheon, Gyeonggi Province, South Korea. This station is on the Seoul Subway Line 1. Camp Casey, an American military base, is located nearby.

== Platforms ==
- Platform 1: to Uijeongbu / Seoul Station / Incheon
- Platform 2: to Soyosan / Dongducheon

== Exits ==
- Exit 1: Bosan Elementary School, Bosan-dong Community Center, Boyoung Girls' Middle School, Sangpaegyo
- Exit 2: Bosan-dong, Bosan Gwangwangteukgu, Korea-USA Friendship Plaza, Bosan Sageori, Dongducheon Post Office, Dongducheon Girls' Middle School, Boyoung Girls' High School, Boyoung Girls' Middle School
