= Pyeonghwa-ro =

Road in South Korea

Pyeonghwa-ro
- 평화로

Route information
- Length: 68.1 km (42.3 mi)
- Existed: 30 August 1997–present

Major junctions
- From: Uijeongbu, Gyeonggi Province
- To: Cheorwon County, Gangwon Province

Location
- Country: South Korea

Highway system
- Highway systems of South Korea; Expressways; National; Local

Pyeonghwa-ro (Korean: 평화로) is a road located in Gyeonggi Province and Gangwon Province, South Korea. With a total length of 68.1 km (42.3 mi), this road starts from the Darak Bridge in Howon-dong, Uijeongbu to Woljeong-ri station in Cheorwon County, Gangwon Province.

== Stopovers ==
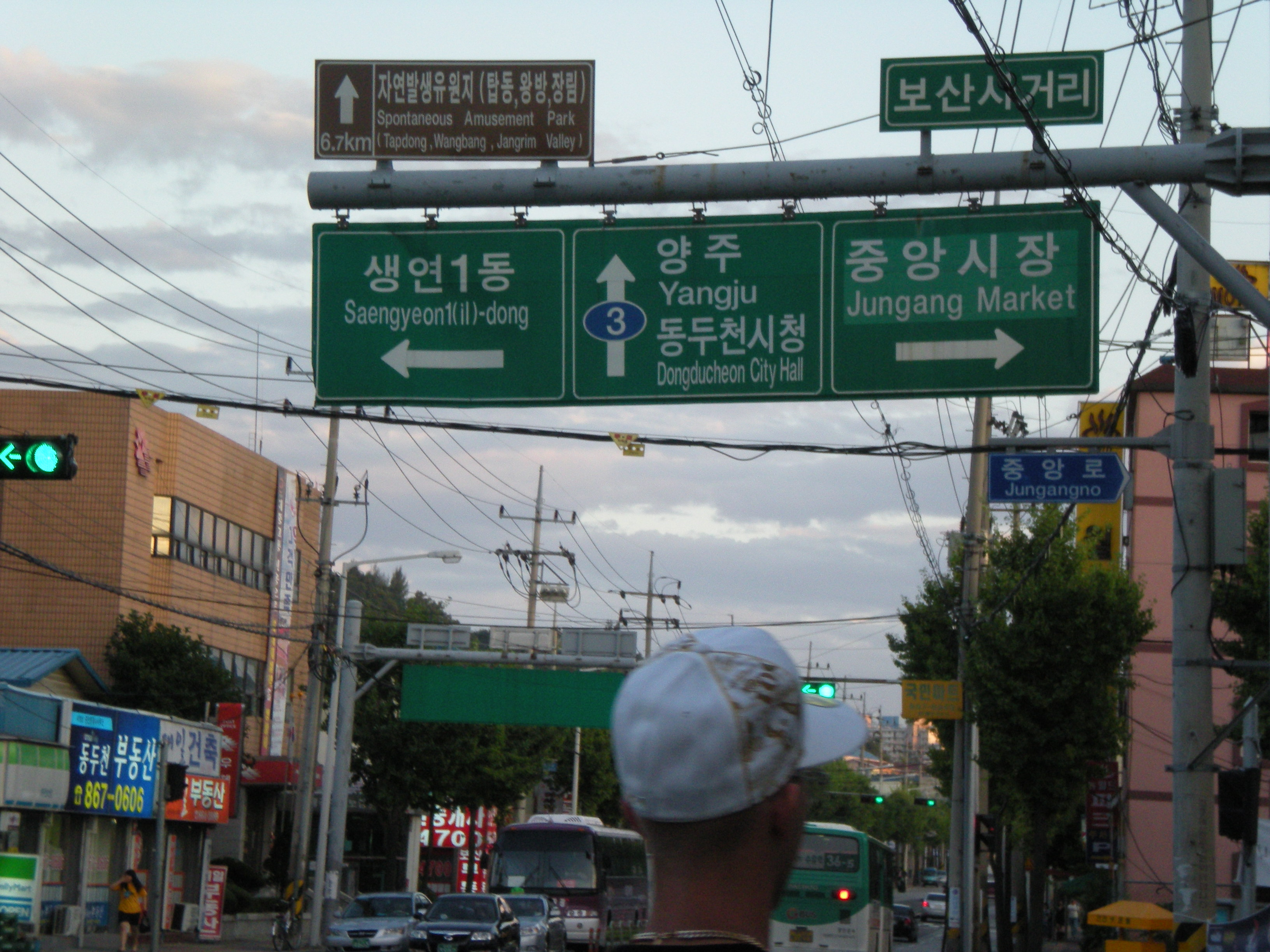
Bosan IS

Gyeonggi Province

- Uijeongbu – Yangju – Dongducheon – Yeoncheon County

Gangwon Province

- Cheorwon County

== List of Facilities ==
- IS: Intersection, IC: Interchange
This road overlapped with National Route 3

=== Gyeonggi Province ===

Name	Hangul name	Connection	Location		Note
Connected with Dobong-ro
Darak Bridge	다락교		Uijeongbu City	Howon-dong	
Howon Overpass	호원고가교	Seobu-ro	Uijeongbu City	Howon-dong	
Lotte Apartment	롯데아파트앞	Seogye-ro	Uijeongbu City	Howon-dong	
Mangwolsa Station IS	망월사역 교차로	Mangwol-ro	Uijeongbu City	Howon-dong	
Mangwolsa station	망월사역		Uijeongbu City	Howon-dong	
No name	(이름 없음)	Anmal-ro	Uijeongbu City	Howon-dong	
Hoeryong station	회룡역		Uijeongbu City	Howon-dong	
Hoeryong Station IS	회룡역앞 교차로	Hoeryong-ro	Uijeongbu City	Howon-dong	
Uijeongbu Bridge IS	의정부교앞 교차로	Baekseok-ro	Uijeongbu City	Howon-dong	
Uijeongbu Bridge	의정부교		Uijeongbu City	Howon-dong	
Uijeongbu Bridge			Uijeongbu City	Uijeongbu-dong	
Gyeongui IS	경의 교차로	Gyeongui-ro; Taepyeong-ro	Uijeongbu City	Uijeongbu-dong	
East Uijeongbu Station IS (Uijeongbu station)	의정부역동부 교차로 (의정부역)	Simin-ro; Haengbok-ro	Uijeongbu City	Uijeongbu-dong	
Heungseon Underpass IS	흥선지하차도 교차로	Heungseon-ro	Uijeongbu City	Uijeongbu-dong	
Jungang IS	중앙 교차로	Hoguk-ro	Uijeongbu City	Uijeongbu-dong	
Uijeongbu Veterans Affairs Office	의정부보훈지청		Uijeongbu City	Uijeongbu-dong	
Munhwa IS	문화 교차로	Ganeung-ro	Uijeongbu City	Uijeongbu-dong	
Ganeung station	가능역		Uijeongbu City	Uijeongbu-dong	
Gajaeul IS	가재울 교차로	Sinchon-ro; Taepyeong-ro	Uijeongbu City	Uijeongbu-dong	
Ganeung IS	가능 교차로	Gageum-ro	Uijeongbu City	Ganeung-dong	
Nogyang IS	녹양사거리	National Route 39 (Seobu-ro)	Uijeongbu City	Nogyang-dong	
Nogyang station	녹양역		Uijeongbu City	Nogyang-dong	
Biseok IS	비석사거리	Majeon-ro; Sanseong-ro	Uijeongbu City	Nogyang-dong	
Biseok IS		Majeon-ro; Sanseong-ro	Yangju City	Yangju-dong	
Yangju Station IS	양주역삼거리	Oemi-ro 64beon-gil	Yangju City	Yangju-dong	
Yangju station	양주역		Yangju City	Yangju-dong	
Oemi IS	외미 교차로	Prefectural Route 360 (Buheung-ro)	Yangju City	Yangju-dong	
Yangju City Hall IS	양주시청사거리	Prefectural Route 98; Prefectural Route 360 (Buheung-ro)	Yangju City	Yangju-dong	
Saemnaegogae	샘내고개		Yangju City	Yangju-dong	
Saemnaegogae			Yangju City	Hoecheon-dong	
Deokgye IS	덕계삼거리	Godeok-ro	Yangju City	Hoecheon-dong	
Yangju Deoksan Elementary School	양주덕산초등학교		Yangju City	Hoecheon-dong	
Deokgye Park	덕계공원		Yangju City	Hoecheon-dong	
Deokgye Park IS	덕계공원사거리	Godeok-ro 139beon-gil Pyeonghwa-ro 1475beon-gil	Yangju City	Hoecheon-dong	
Lotte Mart Yangju Store Hoijung Elementary School	롯데마트 양주점 회정초등학교		Yangju City	Hoecheon-dong	
Hoejeong IS	회정삼거리	Hoejeong-ro	Yangju City	Hoecheon-dong	
Yangju Police Station E-mart Yangju Store	양주경찰서 이마트 양주점		Yangju City	Hoecheon-dong	
Deokjeong IS	덕정사거리	Prefectural Route 55 (Hwahap-ro)	Yangju City	Hoecheon-dong	
Bongyang IS	봉양 교차로	Sinpyeonghwa-ro	Yangju City	Hoecheon-dong	
Bongyang IS	봉양사거리	Yongam-ro; Chilbongsan-ro	Yangju City	Hoecheon-dong	
Songnae IS	송내삼거리	Gangbyeon-ro	Dongducheon City	Songnae-dong	
No name	(이름 없음)	Songnae-ro	Dongducheon City	Songnae-dong	
Dongduchon Jungang High School	동두천중앙고등학교		Dongducheon City	Bulhyeon-dong	
Jihaeng station	지행역	Jihaeng-ro	Dongducheon City	Bulhyeon-dong	
Daewon Villa IS	대원빌라사거리	Janggogaet-ro	Dongducheon City	Bulhyeon-dong	
Saenggol IS	생골사거리	Prefectural Route 364; Prefectural Route 379 (Samnyuksa-ro)	Dongducheon City	Bulhyeon-dong	
Yurim IS	유림사거리	Saenggol-ro; Keunsijang-ro	Dongducheon City	Bulhyeon-dong	
Dongducheonjungang station	동두천중앙역		Dongducheon City	Bulhyeon-dong	
Jeongjang IS	정장사거리	Jeongjang-ro	Dongducheon City	Saengyeon-dong	
Dongyeon IS	동연사거리	Donggwang-ro	Dongducheon City	Saengyeon-dong	
Bosan IS	보산사거리	Jungang-ro	Dongducheon City	Saengyeon-dong	
Bosan station	보산역		Dongducheon City	Bosan-dong	
Bosan Square IS	보산광장삼거리	Janggogaet-ro	Dongducheon City	Bosan-dong	
No name	(이름 없음)	Sangpae-ro	Dongducheon City	Bosan-dong	
2nd Dongducheon Bridge	동두천제2교		Dongducheon City	Bosan-dong	
2nd Dongducheon Bridge			Dongducheon City	Soyo-dong	
Dongducheon station Soyo-dong Community Center	동두천역 소요동주민센터	Prefectural Route 39	Dongducheon City	Soyo-dong	
Dongyang University Dongducheon Campus	동양대학교 동두천캠퍼스		Dongducheon City	Soyo-dong	
Soyosan IS	소요산사거리	Bongdong-ro; Pyeonghwa-ro 2910beon-gil	Dongducheon City	Soyo-dong	
Soyosan station	소요산역		Dongducheon City	Soyo-dong	
Malttukgogae IS	말뚝고개삼거리	Cheongsin-ro	Dongducheon City	Soyo-dong	
Choseong Bridge	초성교		Yeoncheon County	Cheongsan-myeon	
Choseong IS	초성 교차로	Prefectural Route 368 (Cheongsin-ro)	Yeoncheon County	Cheongsan-myeon	
Choseong IS	초성삼거리	Cheongsin-ro	Yeoncheon County	Cheongsan-myeon	
Hakdam IS	학담삼거리	Hakdam-ro 89beon-gil	Yeoncheon County	Cheongsan-myeon	
Daejeon Is	대전삼거리	Prefectural Route 372 (Cheongchang-ro)	Yeoncheon County	Cheongsan-myeon	Prefectural Route 372 overlap
Hantan Bridge IS	한탄대교사거리	Goneung-ro	Yeoncheon County	Cheongsan-myeon	Prefectural Route 372 overlap
Hantan Bridge	한탄대교		Yeoncheon County	Cheongsan-myeon	Prefectural Route 372 overlap
Hantan Bridge			Yeoncheon County	Jeongok-eup	Prefectural Route 372 overlap
Sarang-dong IS	사랑동삼거리		Yeoncheon County	Jeongok-eup	Prefectural Route 372 overlap
Jeongok Entrance IS	전곡입구오거리	Jeongong-ro; Hanyeoul-ro; Jeongong-ro 6beon-gil	Yeoncheon County	Jeongok-eup	Prefectural Route 372 overlap
Paik Hospital IS	백병원앞 교차로	Bamgol-ro	Yeoncheon County	Jeongok-eup	Prefectural Route 372 overlap
No name	(이름 없음)	National Route 37 (Yangyeon-ro)	Yeoncheon County	Jeongok-eup	National Route 37 overlap Prefectural Route 372 overlap
Guseokgi IS	구석기사거리	Jeongokyeok-ro	Yeoncheon County	Jeongok-eup	National Route 37 overlap Prefectural Route 372 overlap
Yeongdo IS	영도사거리	Jeongong-ro 161beon-gil Pyeonghwa-ro 629beon-gil	Yeoncheon County	Jeongok-eup	National Route 37 overlap Prefectural Route 372 overlap
Jeongok Bridge	전곡교	National Route 37 (Jeonyeong-ro); Prefectural Route 372 (Cheongjeong-ro)	Yeoncheon County	Jeongok-eup	National Route 37 overlap Prefectural Route 372 overlap
Taepung Apartment Entrance	태풍아파트입구		Yeoncheon County	Jeongok-eup	
Eundae IS	은대삼거리	Eundae-ro	Yeoncheon County	Jeongok-eup	
Eundae Overpass Baraema-eul Entrance Yeoncheon Fire Station Eosumul Entrance	은대육교 바래마을입구 연천소방서 어수물입구		Yeoncheon County	Jeongok-eup	
Gopo-ri Entrance	고포리입구	Tonghyeon-gil	Yeoncheon County	Yeoncheon-eup	
Tonghyeon IS	통현삼거리	Prefectural Route 78 (Hyeonmun-ro)	Yeoncheon County	Yeoncheon-eup	Prefectural Route 78 overlap
Yeoncheon Entrance IS	연천진입삼거리	Yeoncheon-ro	Yeoncheon County	Yeoncheon-eup	Prefectural Route 78 overlap
Dongmak IS	동막사거리	Dongnae-ro; Yeoncheon-ro 42beon-gil	Yeoncheon County	Yeoncheon-eup	Prefectural Route 78 overlap
Yeoncheon Bridge	연천대교		Yeoncheon County	Yeoncheon-eup	Prefectural Route 78 overlap
Yeoncheon IS	연천 교차로	Under construction	Yeoncheon County	Yeoncheon-eup	Prefectural Route 78 overlap
Joheung Apartment IS	조흥아파트삼거리	Yeoncheonyeok-ro	Yeoncheon County	Yeoncheon-eup	Prefectural Route 78 overlap
Civic Stadium IS	공설운동장삼거리	Munhwa-ro	Yeoncheon County	Yeoncheon-eup	Prefectural Route 78 overlap
Hyeonga IS	현가삼거리	Yeoncheon-ro	Yeoncheon County	Yeoncheon-eup	Prefectural Route 78 overlap
Sangri IS	상리삼거리	Prefectural Route 78 (Gunnam-ro)	Yeoncheon County	Yeoncheon-eup	Prefectural Route 78 overlap
Sinmang-ri station	신망리역		Yeoncheon County	Yeoncheon-eup	
Sangri IS	상리사거리	Sinmang-ro	Yeoncheon County	Yeoncheon-eup	
Wacho IS	와초사거리	Hamnae-ro	Yeoncheon County	Yeoncheon-eup	
Daegwang Bridge	대광교		Yeoncheon County	Yeoncheon-eup	
Daegwang Bridge			Yeoncheon County	Sinseo-myeon	
Naesan-ri Entrance IS	내산리입구 교차로	Prefectural Route 376 (Donae-ro)	Yeoncheon County	Sinseo-myeon	Prefectural Route 376 overlap
Dosin 3-ri IS	도신3리삼거리	Janggeori-gil	Yeoncheon County	Sinseo-myeon	Prefectural Route 376 overlap
Dosin Overpass	도신육교		Yeoncheon County	Sinseo-myeon	Prefectural Route 376 overlap
Bangadari IS	방아다리삼거리	Prefectural Route 376 (Dosin-ro)	Yeoncheon County	Sinseo-myeon	Prefectural Route 376 overlap
Daegwang Elementary School Daegwang-ri station Gyeonggi-do Student Yeoncheon Camp	대광초등학교 대광리역 경기도학생연천야영장		Yeoncheon County	Sinseo-myeon	
Sintan-ri station	신탄리역	Godaesan-gil	Yeoncheon County	Sinseo-myeon	
Sintan Bridge	신탄교		Yeoncheon County	Sinseo-myeon	Continuation into Gangwon Province

=== Gangwon Province ===
Name	Hangul name	Connection	Location		Note
Daema-ri	대마리		Cheorwon County	Cheorwon-eup	Gyeonggi Province – Gangwon Province border line
Baengmagoji station	백마고지역		Cheorwon County	Cheorwon-eup	
Daema IS	대마사거리	National Route 87; Prefectural Route 463 (Myojang-ro)	Cheorwon County	Cheorwon-eup	
Sayo-ri Oechon-ri Naepo-ri	사요리 외촌리 내포리		Cheorwon County	Cheorwon-eup	Civilian Control Zone (CCZ)
Woljeong-ri station	월정리역	Durumi-ro	Cheorwon County	Cheorwon-eup	Civilian Control Zone (CCZ)
