= Bulgoksan =

Bulgoksan (불곡산; 佛谷山) is the name of two mountains in South Korea:

- Bulgoksan (Seongnam/Gwangju) is in Seongnam and Gwangju, Gyeonggi-do
- Bulgoksan (Yangju) is in Yangju, Gyeonggi-do
