= Uijeongbu (disambiguation) =

Uijeongbu or Uijŏngbu can refer to:

- Uijeongbu City, in north party of the South Korean Gyeonggi province.
- the State Council of Joseon, known in Korean as the ui jeong bu
- Uijeongbu station
