= Dongducheon Jungang station =

Metro station in Dongducheon, South Korea

동두천중앙; Dongducheon Jungang
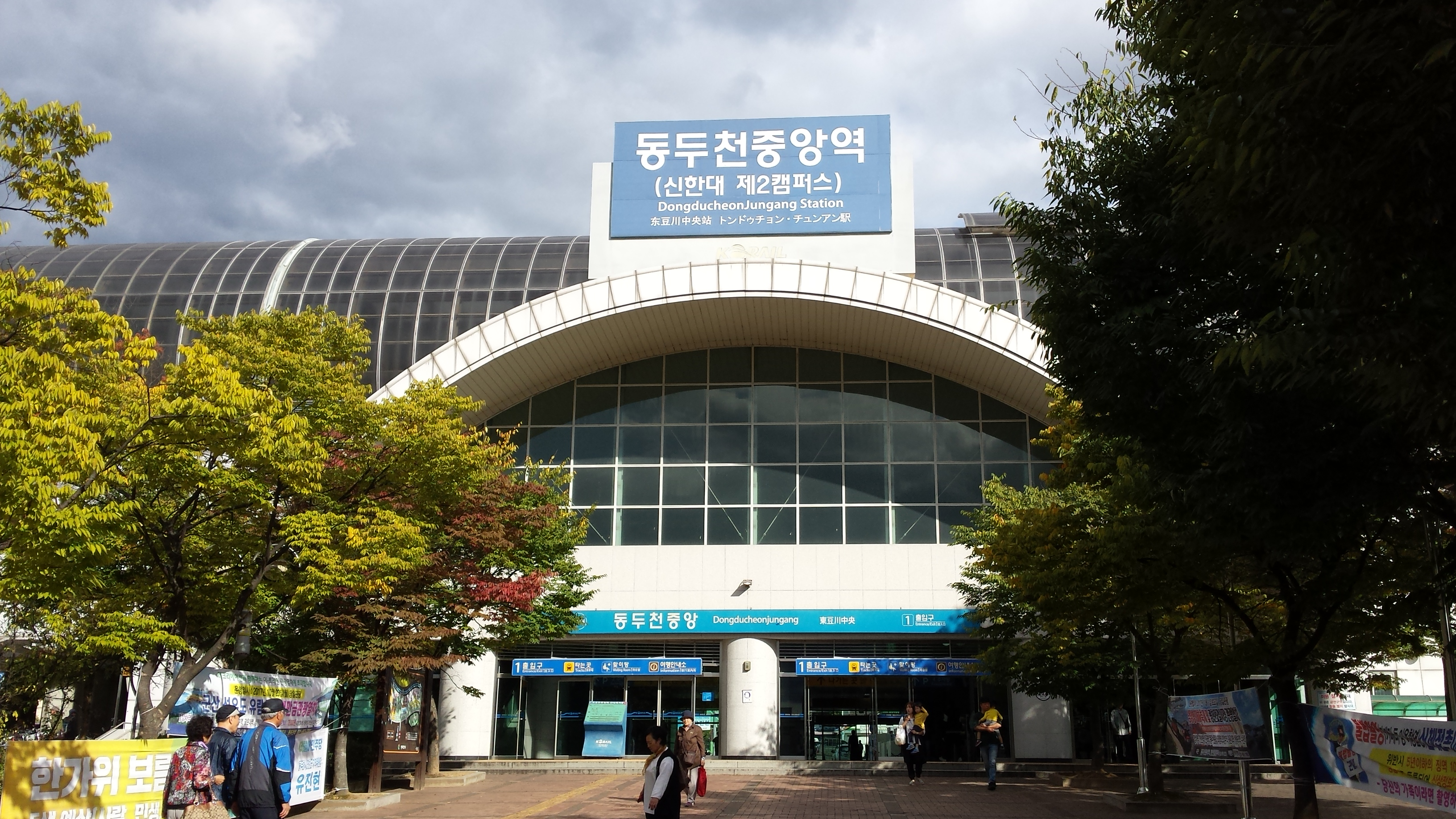

Korean name
- Hangul: 동두천중앙역
- Hanja: 東豆川中央驛
- Revised Romanization: Dongducheonjung-ang-yeok
- McCune–Reischauer: Tongduch'ŏnjungang-yŏk

General information
- Other names: Eosu-dong
- Location: 682 Saengyeon-dong, 228 Dongducheonno, Dongducheon-si, Gyeonggi-do; South Korea
- Coordinates: 37°54′08″N 127°03′23″E
- Operator: Korail
- Line: Gyeongwon Line
- Platforms: 2
- Tracks: 4

Construction
- Structure type: Aboveground

History
- Opened: February 1, 1955; December 15, 2006

Passengers
- Based on Jan-Dec of 2012. Line 1: 8,793

Services
Preceding station	Seoul Metropolitan Subway	Following station
Bosan towards Soyosan	Line 1	Jihaeng towards Incheon
Dongducheon Terminus	Line 1 Gyeongwon Express	Jihaeng towards Incheon
Location

Dongducheon Jungang Station (Korean: 동두천중앙역) is a train station on the Seoul Subway Line 1 and the Gyeongwon Line. The name means Dongducheon Central Station. It was also once known as Eosu-dong Station.

== Station name ==
From its opening until 1984, it was operated under the name of Eosu-dong, and from 1984 to December 15, 2006, it was operated under the name of Dongducheon. However, with the extension of Line 1 to Soyosan, the station name was changed to Dongducheon Jungang, and the name Dongducheon Station was once again used by Dongan Station, which had been called Dongducheon Station before 1984.

== Platforms ==
- Platform 1: to Kwangwoon Univ. / Seoul Station / Incheon (Rapid Line)
- Platform 2: to Kwangwoon Univ. / Seoul Station / Incheon
- Platform 3: to Soyosan / Dongducheon
- Platform 4: to Dongducheon (Rapid Line)

== Exits ==
- Exit 1: Saengyeon Post Office, Bus Terminal, Sadong Elementary School, Eosusageori, Dongducheon Public Health Center, Jangangjaerae Market, Jungang-dong Community Center, National Health Insurance Corporation
- Exit 2: Parking Lot
- Exit 3: Dongducheon City Hall, Dongducheon Regional Meteorological Office, Dongduchon Middle School, Dongducheon High School, Saengyeongeullin Park, Saengyeon Elementary School, Dongducheon Girls' Middle School
- Exit 4: Parking Lot
