= Local Route 39 (South Korea) =

Road in South Korea

State-Funded Local Highway 39
- 국가지원지방도 제39호선
- Yangju-Dongducheon Line 양주 ~ 동두천선

Route information
- Length: 29.6 km (18.4 mi)
- Existed: 19 July 1996–present

Major junctions
- South end: Jangheung-myeon, Yangju, Gyeonggi Province
- North end: Soyo-dong, Dongducheon, Gyeonggi Province

Location
- Country: South Korea

Highway system
- Highway systems of South Korea; Expressways; National; Local

Local Route 39 Yangju–Dongducheon Line (Korean: 국가지원지방도 제39호선 양주 ~ 동두천선) is a local route of South Korea that connecting Yangju to Dongducheon, Gyeonggi Province.

== History ==
The route was originally planned as an extension of National Route 39 to Dongducheon but was instead designated as a state-funded local route on 19 July 1996, running from Uijeongbu to Dongducheon. In 2012 the route was shortened to Yangju.

== Stopovers ==
Gyeonggi Province

- Yangju - Dongducheon

== Major intersections ==
- (■): Motorway

IS: Intersection, IC: Interchange

=== Gyeonggi Province ===
| Name | Hangul name | Connection | Location | | Note |
|---|---|---|---|---|---|
| (South of Uldae Bridge) | (울대교 남단) | Hoguk-ro | Yangju City | Jangheung-myeon | Terminus |
| Uldae Bridge Bugok Bridge Jangcheon Bridge | 울대교 부곡교 장천교 | | Yangju City | Jangheung-myeon | |
| Bugok IS | 부곡 교차로 | National Route 39 (Sinhoguk-ro) | Yangju City | Jangheung-myeon | |
| Bugok 3 Village Bridge Gama Bridge | 부곡3새마을교 가마교 | | Yangju City | Jangheung-myeon | |
| Seokhyeon IS | 석현삼거리 | Prefectural Route 371 (Gwonnyul-ro) | Yangju City | Jangheung-myeon | Prefectural Route 371 overlap |
| Malmeori Pass (Malburi Pass) | 말머리고개 (말부리고개) | | Yangju City | Jangheung-myeon | Prefectural Route 371 overlap |
| Malmeori Pass (Malburi Pass) | | | Yangju City | Baekseok-eup | Prefectural Route 371 overlap |
| (Gisan Reservoir) | (기산저수지) | Prefectural Route 98 (Gisan-ro) | Yangju City | Baekseok-eup | Prefectural Route 98, 371 overlap |
| Sosa Pass | 소사고개 | | Yangju City | Baekseok-eup | Prefectural Route 98, 371 overlap |
| Hongjuk IS | 홍죽삼거리 | Yangjusanseong-ro | Yangju City | Baekseok-eup | Prefectural Route 98, 371 overlap |
| Hongjuk IS | 홍죽 교차로 | Yeongok-ro | Yangju City | Baekseok-eup | Prefectural Route 98, 371 overlap |
| Danchon IS | 단촌삼거리 | Prefectural Route 98 (Jungang-ro) | Yangju City | Baekseok-eup | Prefectural Route 98, 371 overlap |
| Baekseok Bridge | 백석교 | | Yangju City | Baekseok-eup | Prefectural Route 371 overlap |
| Baekseok Bridge | | | Yangju City | Gwangjeok-myeon | Prefectural Route 371 overlap |
| Culture & Arts IS | 문예회관삼거리 | Buheung-ro 618beon-gil | Yangju City | Gwangjeok-myeon | Prefectural Route 371 overlap |
| Daesung Villa IS | 대성빌라사거리 | Prefectural Route 360 (Buheung-ro) | Yangju City | Gwangjeok-myeon | Prefectural Route 360, 371 overlap |
| Joyang Middle School Ganap Elementary School | 조양중학교 가납초등학교 | | Yangju City | Gwangjeok-myeon | Prefectural Route 360, 371 overlap |
| Ganap IS | 가납사거리 | Prefectural Route 360 (Buheung-ro); Prefectural Route 371 (Gwangjeok-ro) | Yangju City | Gwangjeok-myeon | Prefectural Route 360, 371 overlap |
| Seungri Bridge IS | 승리교사거리 | Garaebi-gil | Yangju City | Gwangjeok-myeon | |
| Seoku Bridge | 석우교 | | Yangju City | Gwangjeok-myeon | |
| Gyeongsin IS | 경신 교차로 | Hyeonseok-ro | Yangju City | Nam-myeon | |
| Biseok IS | 비석삼거리 | Samil-ro 485beon-gil | Yangju City | Nam-myeon | |
| Gyeongsin Bridge | 경신교 | | Yangju City | Nam-myeon | |
| Sangsu 4 IS | 상수4 교차로 | Prefectural Route 56 (Hwahap-ro) | Yangju City | Nam-myeon | |
| (Ipam 2-ri) | (입암2리) | | Yangju City | Nam-myeon | |
| (Ipam 1-ri) | (입암1리) | | Yangju City | Nam-myeon | Under construction |
| Hansa-ri | 한산리 | | Yangju City | Nam-myeon | Under construction |
| Bongam-ri | 봉암리 | Prefectural Route 375 (Eunhyeon-ro) | Yangju City | Eunhyeon-myeon | Under construction |
| Bongam-ri | | Prefectural Route 364 (Samnyuksa-ro) | Yangju City | Eunhyeon-myeon | Under construction |
| Anheung-dong | 안흥동 | | Dongducheon City | Soyo-dong | Under construction |
| Anheung Bridge | 안흥교 | | Dongducheon City | Soyo-dong | Under construction |
| Soyo-dong Community Center | 소요동주민센터 | National Route 3 (Pyeonghwa-ro) | Dongducheon City | Soyo-dong | Terminus |

== See also ==
- Roads and expressways in South Korea
- Transportation in South Korea
