= Bulgoksan (Seongnam and Gwangju) =

Mountain in Gyeonggi Province, South Korea

Highest point
- Elevation: 345 m (1,132 ft)
- Coordinates: 37°20′36″N 127°08′27″E

Geography
- Location: Between Seongnam Gyeonggi Province and Gwangju, South Korea

Korean name
- Hangul: 불곡산
- Hanja: 佛谷山
- RR: Bulgoksan
- MR: Pulgoksan

Bulgoksan (Korean: 불곡산) is a mountain in Gyeonggi Province, South Korea. Its area extends over the cities of Seongnam and Gwangju. Bulgoksan has an elevation of 345 m (1,132 ft). The mountain shares a name with another mountain in the Gyeonggi Province near Yangju.

Bulgoksan serves as a public recreation area at the southernmost part of the Seongnam green belt between Jeongja-dong and Gumi-dong. It also hosts hang gliding take-off runs in the Southwest and Northeast.

Bulgoksan is designated trail with Yeongjangsan by Seongnam. Its peak is near to Sunae, Jeongja, Gumi-dong. Bulgoksan is loved by the citizens of Budang.

To the north, the Bulgoksan mountain passes Taehyeon and Saemaul Pass by Taehyeon and Saemaul Pass, and leads to Neungnae Pass and Galmachi Pass, and Namhansansan Island. To the south, it passed the Danggogae in Bucheon, followed by Seongnae-eup in Seongnam, Gwangju, and Sunjeong-gu in Yongin.

The hiking begins in Sunae-dong, Jeongja-dong, and Gumi. Starting in Jeongja-dong, people go to Bukjeong High School and the water station to climb the ridge and then follow Namgeung-dong. There is also a course of origin that connects to the Munjeongsan Mountain in Opo-myeon. On the top of the mountain can be seen a new town in Bundang, Yongin, and Jukjeon, and the natural ecosystem is well preserved, and a dense forest is abundant, creating a new view of Chunghyak-dong.

== Legend ==
There is a story that the name of mountain is named Bulgok because there was a temple in the mountain. Jeongja-dong residents considered this mountain holy. They had a ritual they performed for the mountain spirit. Because of this the mountain is also called as Mt.Seongduck or Mt. HyoJong. (In Hanja, "seong" means holy and "duck" means virtue.)

== Hiking information ==
Mt. Bulgok's hiking course is 5.6 km long and requires about 2 1/2 hours to complete. It has many rest areas and athletic facilities. This includes 129 rest and meditation spots. The Songnam locals make use of the mountain often because of the easy access from the city itself.

You are able to climb the mountain from Sunae, Buljeong, Jeongja, Gumi. The paths that are connected behind the Korea Land and Housing Corporation is tough with high, rocky slopes.

== See also ==
- List of mountains in Korea
- Tancheon
