= Ganeung station =

Metro station in Uijeongbu, South Korea

가능 (을지대병원); Ganeung (Eulji Univ. Medical Center)
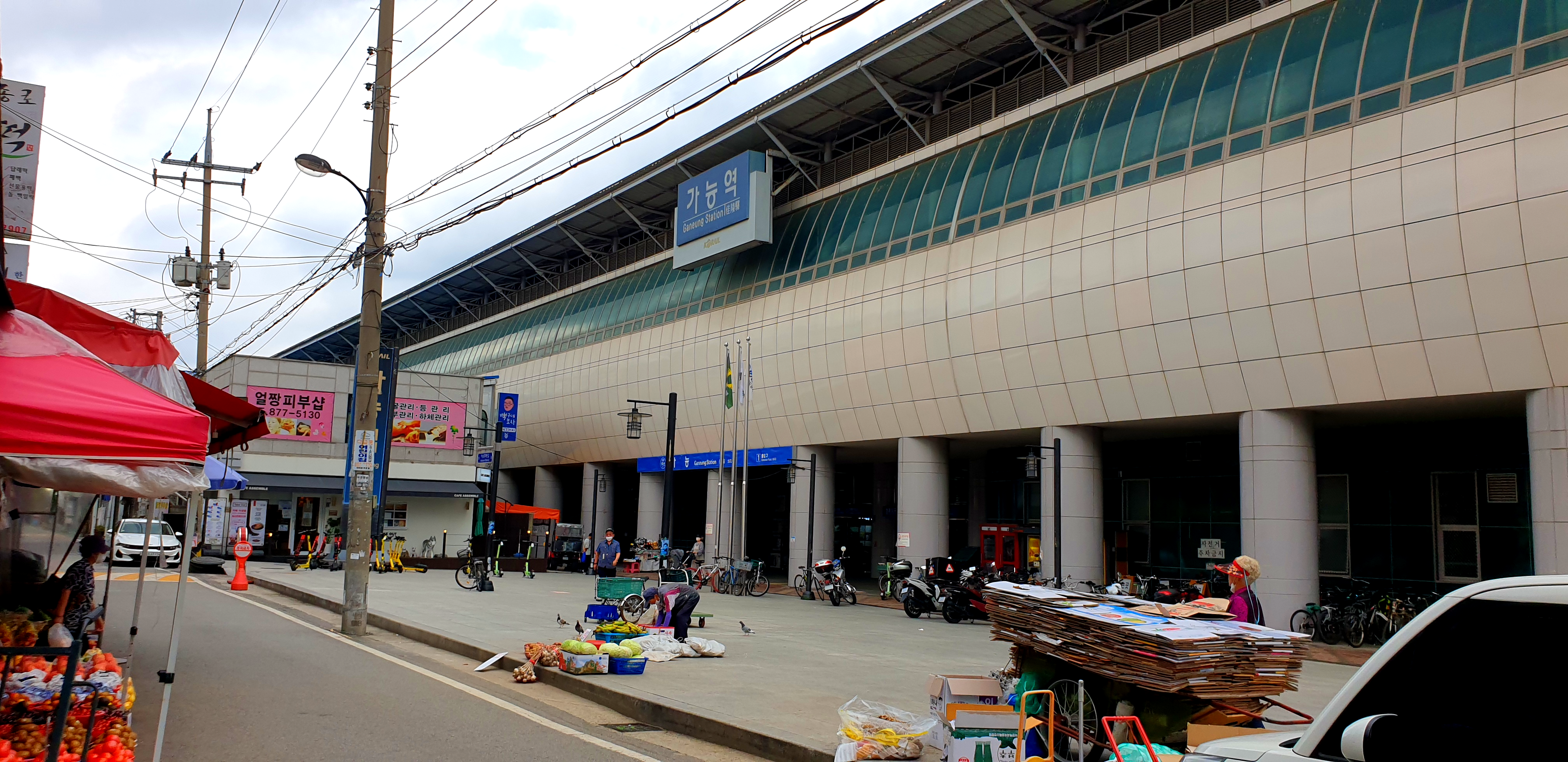

Korean name
- Hangul: 가능역
- Hanja: 佳陵驛
- Revised Romanization: Ganeung-yeok
- McCune–Reischauer: Kanŭng-yŏk

General information
- Location: 633 Pyeonghwa-ro, Uijeongbu-si, Gyeonggi-do; South Korea
- Coordinates: 37°44′54″N 127°02′39″E
- Operator: Korail
- Line: Gyeongwon Line
- Platforms: 2
- Tracks: 3

Construction
- Structure type: Aboveground

History
- Opened: October 5, 1987
- Former names: Gareung; Uijeongbu Bukbu

Passengers
- Based on Jan-Dec of 2012. Line 1: 17,393

Services
Preceding station	Seoul Metropolitan Subway	Following station
Nogyang towards Soyosan	Line 1	Uijeongbu towards Incheon
Location

Ganeung station is a metro station on the Line 1 of the Seoul Metropolitan Subway. The station is located in northern Uijeongbu and previously served as the northern terminus for Line 1 before its extension to Soyosan.

== History ==
It was originally built as a traditional railway station in 1961, named Gareung station, but was abolished in 1963. It was rebuilt as Uijeongbu Bukbu station and then renamed Ganeung in 2006.

== Platforms ==
- Platform 1: to Kwangwoon University / Guro / Incheon
- Platform 2: to Soyosan / Dongducheon / Yangju

== Exits ==
- Exit 1: Ganeung 1-dong Office, Korean National Red Cross, Uijeongbu Girls' High School, Uijeongbu Girls' Middle School, Uijeongbu Technical High School, Korea Electric Power Corporation
- Exit 2: Baeyoung Elementary School, Uijeongbu Joongang Elementary School, Uijeongbu 1-dong Post Office
- Exit 3: Parking lot
