= Bulgoksan (Yangju) =

Mountain in Gyeonggi Province, South Korea

Highest point
- Elevation: 468.7 m (1,538 ft)
- Coordinates: 37°47′59″N 127°01′33″E

Geography
- Location: South Korea

Korean name
- Hangul: 불곡산
- Hanja: 佛谷山
- RR: Bulgoksan
- MR: Pulgoksan

Bulgoksan (Korean: 불곡산) is a mountain in Gyeonggi Province, South Korea. It is in Yangju. Bulgoksan has an elevation of 468.7 m (1,538 ft).

== Hiking course ==
The hiking begins at the entrance to Baekhwa Rock in Yoyang-dong. If you follow the road to the west in front of Yooyang Elementary School, you will find a sign to enter Baekhwa Rock. Follow this sign along the northern cement road to white rock. Baekhwa-am Rock has been destroyed in the Japanese Invasion of Korea and the Korean War. They prepare drinking water and go hiking. If you follow the valley path next to Baekhwa Rock, you will get to the safety range. From here, it follows the northwest ridge, and from this road to the summit is rocky. The view from the summit gives a fine view. To the south, you can see the ridges of Dobongsan and the city of Uijeongbu and Dongducheon.

Down course goes down to 420 km along the western ridge from the summit. As you go along this road, you can escape through the rock that is on top of the Ambong and grab a rope. Go down from 420 bar to 2 bar. This course takes about 3 hours and 30 minutes. There are also trails that climb mountains from the north. It starts at Samnae Station in Buksan-ri, passes through Buchungsa Temple and reaches the cross road. It is a course that reaches the top of the mountain and then comes down to Baekhwa Rock. This course will take about three hours.

Take the subway or bus from Uijeongbu to Uijeongbu and the city bus from Uijeongbu to Yuyang company or Samnae station. If you are using a car, take National Road No. 3 to Uijeongbu. From Uijeongbu, turn left to Yuyang-dong after passing an intrastate checkpoint in Yangju.

Nearby, there are many amusement parks such as Songchu Resort, Ilyoung Resort, and Jangheung Tourist Resort. There are almost no accommodation facilities on the lower section of the mountain, so it is used in downtown Uijeongbu or Jangheung.

== See also ==
- List of mountains in Korea
