= Soyosan =

Mountain in South Korea

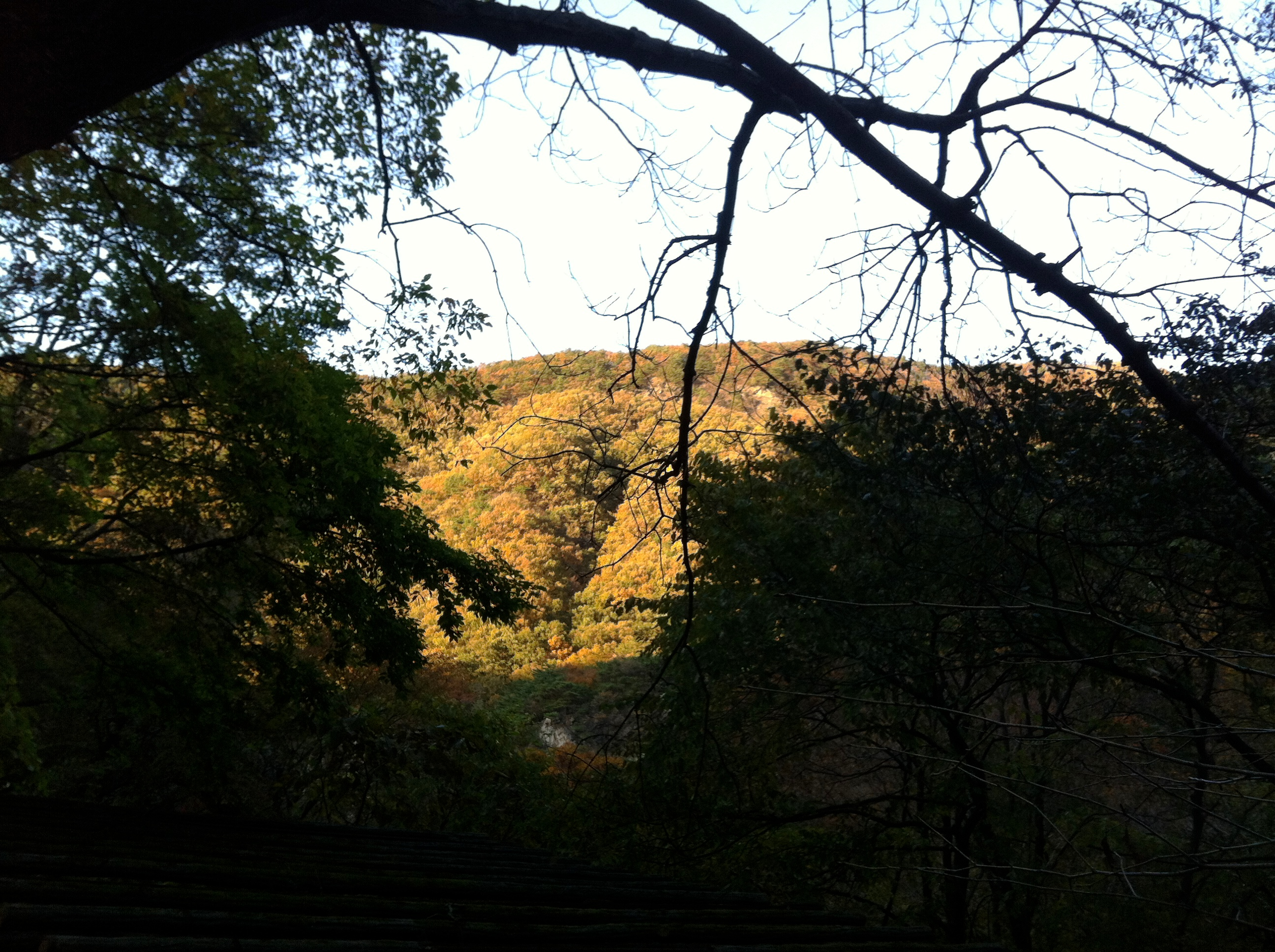

Highest point
- Elevation: 587 m (1,926 ft)
- Coordinates: 37°56′31″N 127°05′20″E

Geography
- Location: South Korea

Korean name
- Hangul: 소요산
- Hanja: 逍遙山
- RR: Soyosan
- MR: Soyosan

Soyosan (Korean: 소요산) is a mountain in Gyeonggi Province, South Korea. Its area extends across the cities of Pocheon and Dongducheon. It has an elevation of 587 m (1,926 ft). The mountain is home to two Buddhist shrines commemorating Silla priests Wonhyo and Uisang, and a small temple called Jajaeam. The mountain is famous for its small waterfalls and spring wells and is a popular hiking route.

== See also ==
- List of mountains in Korea
