= Yangju =

City in Gyeonggi, South Korea

Coordinates: 37°47′06″N 127°02′45″E

- Municipal City
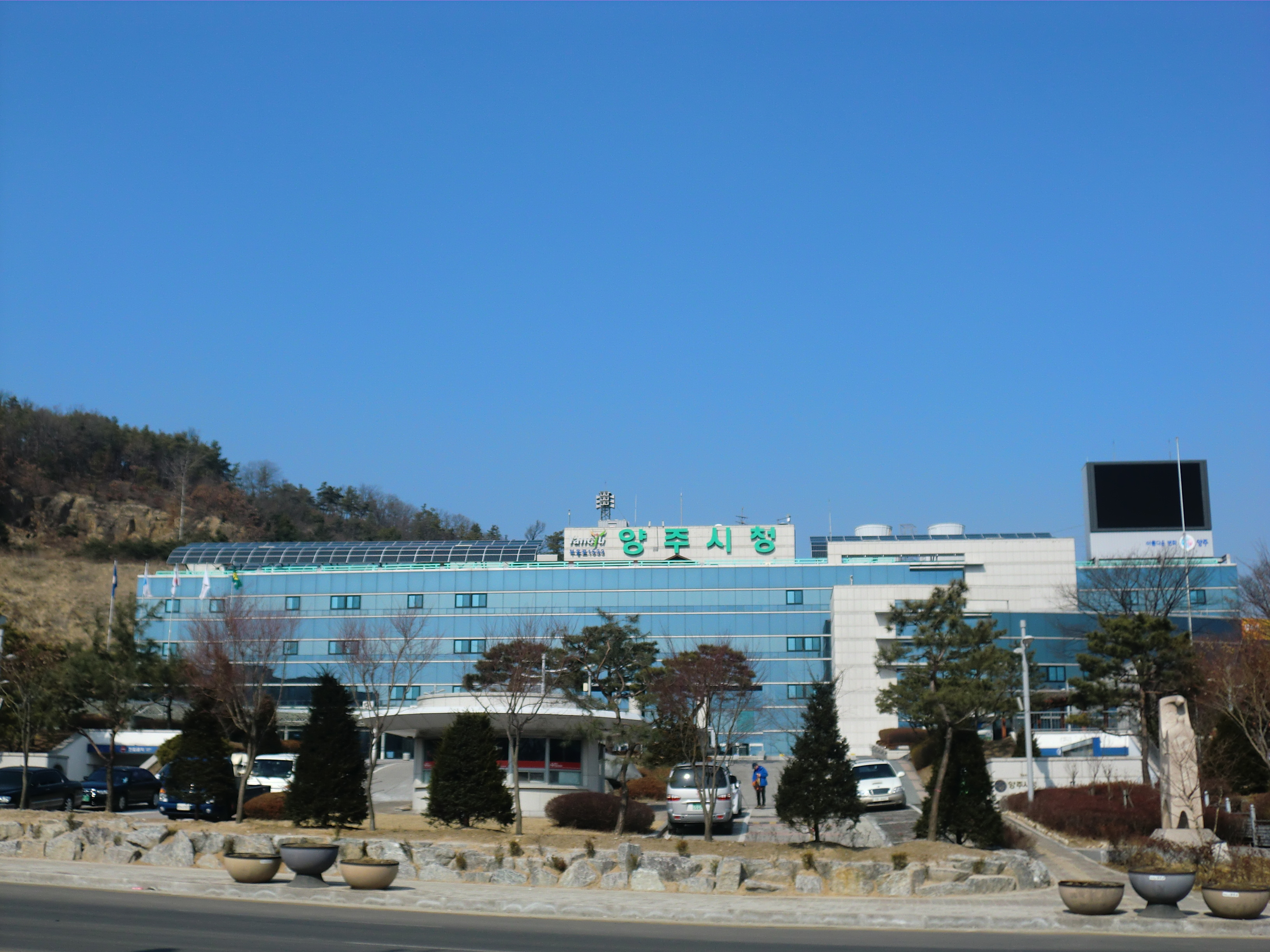

- Flag Emblem of Yangju

- Location in South Korea
- Country: South Korea
- Region: Gyeonggi Province (Sudogwon)
- Administrative divisions: 1 eup, 4 myeon, 6 dong

Area
  - Total: 310.1 km^{2} (119.7 sq mi)

Population (September 2024)
  - Total: 285,930
  - Density: 611.1/km^{2} (1,583/sq mi)
  - Dialect: Seoul

Korean name
- Hangul: 양주시
- Hanja: 楊州市
- RR: Yangju-si
- MR: Yangju-si

Yangju (Korean: 양주; Korean pronunciation: [jaŋ.dʑu]) is a city in Gyeonggi Province, South Korea. Yangju is located south of Dongducheon and north of Uijeongbu, not far from Seoul.

In the past, it was one region with Uijeongbu-si, Guri-si, Namyangju-si, Dongducheon-si, and some parts of Seoul, so the county office was located in Uijeongbu, which was the largest town in Yangju at the time and the center of all of Yangju, including the current Guri and Namyangju. Even after the separation of Uijeongbu-si in 1963, the county office remained in Uijeongbu city, and it was not until 2000 that it ended its life as Uijeongbu and moved to its current location near the site of the Yangju Mok government office, and when it was promoted to Yangju-si in 2003, it was given the title of city hall.

== History ==
- 1395 – Renamed to Yangju.
- January 1, 1963 – Uijeongbu is separated and becomes a city.
- April 1, 1980 – Namyangju is separated and becomes a city.
- July 1, 1981 – Dongducheon is separated and becomes a city.

== Attractions ==
Yangju is home to the Jangheun Art Gallery, which features six exhibition halls and includes subsidiary facilities such as outdoor performances and outdoor sculptures. Yangju also has an astronomical observatory and a planetarium that are open to the public. The city also used to have a walking Dae Jang Geum Theme Park featuring the film locations and constructed sets for the MBC Korean drama Daejanggeum, but this was closed permanently in late 2011 due to persistent vandalism.

Yangju also hosts the yearly Yangju Snow Festival. The city has a few mountains, including Gamaksan and Bulgoksan, which can be hiked. Part of Bukhansan is located within Yangju.

== Town ==
It is divided into Okjeong New City and Hoecheon New City.

Okjeong City consists of Okjeong Village, Yuljeong Village, Hoeam Village, Wow Village, Cheonbosan Village, and Dokbawigol.

=== Okjeong new city ===
In the beginning, the correct name was Okjeong-gu, Yangjin City, but the LH removed the name Yangjin-city to reflect the opinions of residents, and Okjeong-gu was called Okjeong-si, and Hoecheon-si was called Hoecheon New Town. It is being sold under the name of the city of Okshin City. It claims to be a pleasant new town with a green area ratio of 26.88% where a high-tech city and clean nature harmonize. Okjeong and Hoecheon With a population of 160,000, the target population of 41,481 households is 106,000. As of March 2021, 17 complexes have been completed / moved in, and the resident population has exceeded 50,000 (as of February 10, 2021).

Currently 8 complexes remain.

=== Okjeong Lake Park ===
Okjeong Lake Park is a lake park that has been completed since the development of Yangshuo City in 2007. There are facilities such as a fountain facility, an outdoor stage, and a lake observatory.

== Climate ==
Yangju has a monsoon-influenced humid continental climate (Köppen: Dwa) with cold, dry winters and hot, rainy summers.

Climate data for Yangju (1996–2020 normals)
Month	Jan	Feb	Mar	Apr	May	Jun	Jul	Aug	Sep	Oct	Nov	Dec	Year
Mean daily maximum °C (°F)	1.7 (35.1)	5.0 (41.0)	11.2 (52.2)	18.3 (64.9)	24.2 (75.6)	28.2 (82.8)	29.5 (85.1)	30.5 (86.9)	26.5 (79.7)	20.3 (68.5)	11.6 (52.9)	3.5 (38.3)	17.5 (63.5)
Daily mean °C (°F)	−4.8 (23.4)	−1.5 (29.3)	4.5 (40.1)	11.2 (52.2)	17.3 (63.1)	22.1 (71.8)	24.8 (76.6)	25.3 (77.5)	20.1 (68.2)	12.7 (54.9)	5.0 (41.0)	−2.5 (27.5)	11.2 (52.2)
Mean daily minimum °C (°F)	−10.7 (12.7)	−7.5 (18.5)	−1.9 (28.6)	4.3 (39.7)	10.8 (51.4)	16.6 (61.9)	21.1 (70.0)	21.2 (70.2)	14.7 (58.5)	6.3 (43.3)	−0.7 (30.7)	−8.0 (17.6)	5.5 (41.9)
Average precipitation mm (inches)	14.3 (0.56)	23.2 (0.91)	30.6 (1.20)	63.7 (2.51)	95.6 (3.76)	114.6 (4.51)	381.0 (15.00)	340.4 (13.40)	141.7 (5.58)	47.4 (1.87)	46.2 (1.82)	18.2 (0.72)	1,316.9 (51.85)
Average precipitation days (≥ 0.1 mm)	3.1	3.9	5.6	7.4	7.9	7.9	13.8	12.2	7.4	5.2	7.0	5.2	86.6
Source: Korea Meteorological Administration

== Transportation ==
There are three subway stations covered by the Seoul Metropolitan Subway, and it takes about 70 minutes from the center of Seoul to the first station located in Yangju. Also, there are numerous public bus services running between Seoul, Uijeongbu, and up to Yeoncheon, where the border with North Korea is crossed by the Demilitarized Military Zone.

=== Railroad ===
Korail (Seoul Subway Line 1)

- Deokjeong station
- Deokgye station
- Yangju station

=== Bus ===
- City Bus: Yangju City Bus, Yangju Village Bus
- Intercity Bus: Yangju Intercity Bus Station

=== Road ===
Highway

- Seoul Ring Expressway: Songchu IC, Sapsan Tunnel
- Sejong–Pocheon Expressway: Okjeong IC, Yangju IC
- Highway Route No. 400

Route

- National Route 3, National Route 39

Local Roads

- Local Route 39, Local Route 56, Local Route 78, Local Route 98
- Local Route 360, Local Route 364, Local Route 367, Local Route 371, Local Route 379

== Sister cities ==
- South Korea – Eunpyeong District, Seoul
- United States – Henrico County, Virginia
- China – Dongying, Shandong
- Japan – Fujieda, Shizuoka

== Notable people from Yangju ==
- Lee Seung-hyung (이승형), South Korean actor.

== Statistics ==
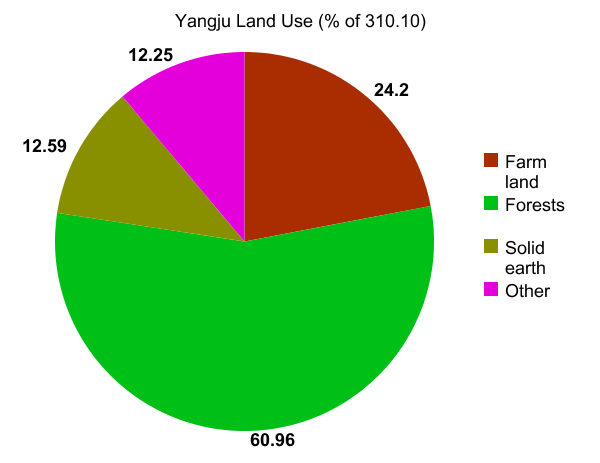

== See also ==
- List of cities in South Korea
- Yangju highway incident
- Yangju Citizen FC
