= Uijeongbu station =

Metro station in Uijeongbu, South Korea

의정부
Uijeongbu
의정부; Uijeongbu
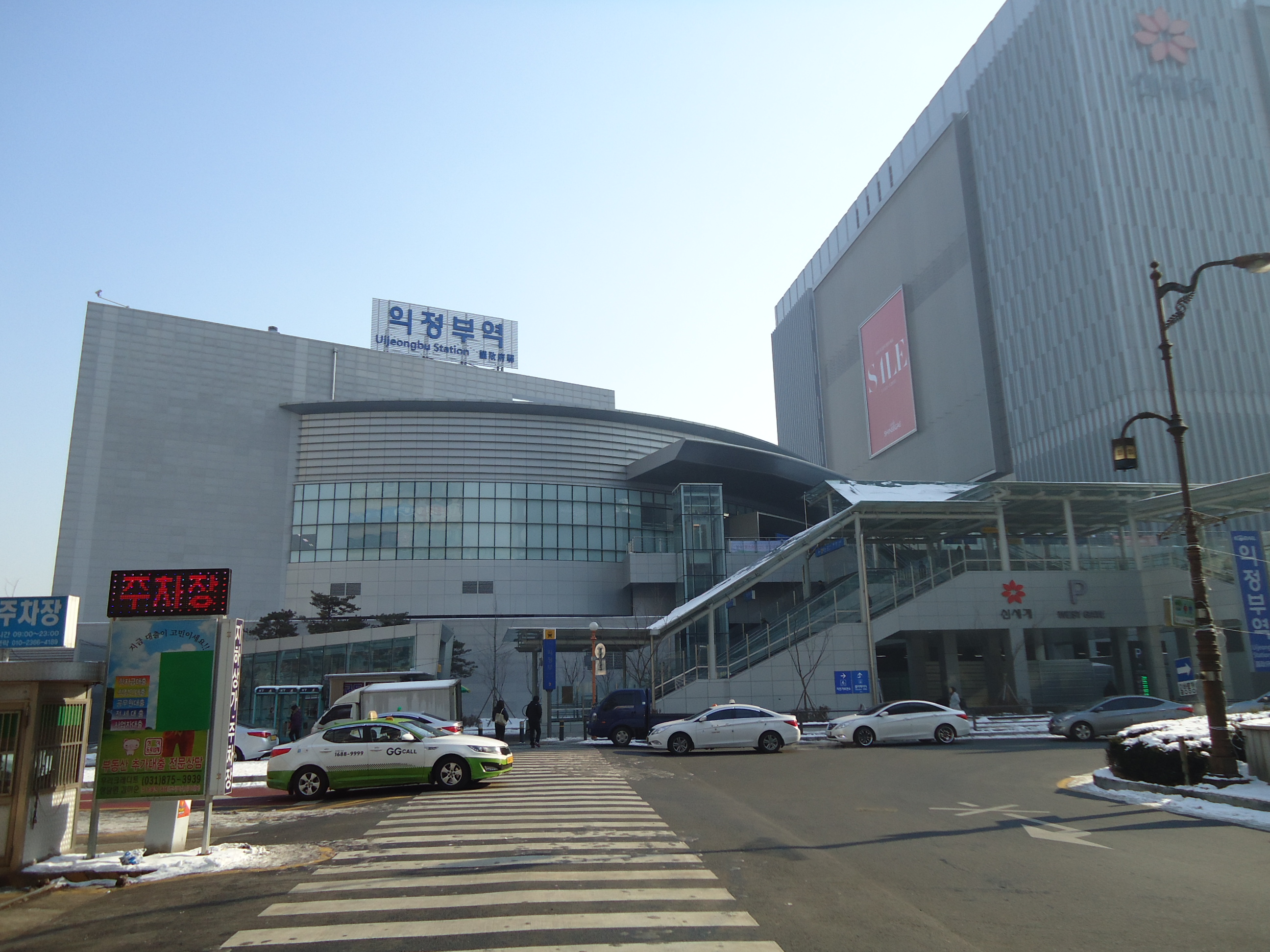

Korean name
- Hangul: 의정부역
- Hanja: 議政府驛
- Revised Romanization: Uijeongbu-yeok
- McCune–Reischauer: Ŭijŏngbu-yŏk

General information
- Location: 525 Pyeonghwa-ro, Uijeongbu-si, Gyeonggi-do; South Korea
- Coordinates: 37°44′17″N 127°02′46″E
- Operator: Korail
- Line: Gyeongwon Line
- Platforms: 3
- Tracks: 6

Construction
- Structure type: Aboveground

History
- Opened: October 15, 1911; September 2, 1986

Passengers
- Based on Jan-Dec of 2012. KR: 21; Line 1: 49,844
Services
Preceding station	Seoul Metropolitan Subway	Following station
Ganeung towards Yeoncheon	Line 1	Hoeryong towards Incheon
Yangju towards Dongducheon	Line 1 Gyeongwon Express	Hoeryong towards Incheon
Preceding station	Korail	Following station
Songchu towards Daegok	Mugunghwa-ho Gyooe Line	Terminus
Location

Uijeongbu station is a station on the Gyeongwon Line in South Korea. It is also served by trains on Seoul Subway Line 1.

== Exits ==
- Exit 1: Bus Terminal, Uijeongbu Paik General Hospital, Military Manpower Administration, Dongbu Plaza
- Exit 2: Uijeongbu District Public Prosecutor's Office, Gyeonggi Provincial Government 2nd Office, National Health Insurance Corporation, Korea Labor Welfare Corporation, Uijeongbu Police Station, Uijeongbu Fire Station, Uijeongbu City Hall, Uijeongbu Medical Center
