= Soyosan station =

Station of the Seoul Metropolitan Subway

소요산; Soyosan

Korean name
- Hangul: 소요산역
- Hanja: 逍遙山驛
- Revised Romanization: Soyosannyeok
- McCune–Reischauer: Soyosannyŏk

General information
- Location: 126-3 Sangbongam-dong, 2925 Pyeonghwa-ro, Dongducheon-si, Gyeonggi-do; South Korea
- Coordinates: 37°56′55″N 127°03′39″E
- Operator: Korail
- Line: Gyeongwon Line
- Platforms: 2 (2 side platforms)
- Tracks: 2
- Connections: Bus station

Construction
- Structure type: Aboveground

History
- Opened: December 23, 1975
- Closed: December 15, 2023 (old ground level platform)
- Rebuilt: December 16, 2023 (new elevated platforms)

Key dates
- December 15, 2006: Line 1 started service

Passengers
- Based on Jan–Dec 2012. KR: 148; Line 1: 8,730 operator= Korail

Services
Preceding station	Seoul Metropolitan Subway	Following station
Cheongsan towards Yeoncheon	Line 1	Dongducheon towards Incheon
Location

Soyosan station (Korean: 소요산역; Hanja: 逍遙山驛; RR: Soyosan-yeok) is a ground-level metro station on Line 1 of the Seoul Subway in Sangbongam Dong, Dongducheon, South Korea. It is named after the nearby Soyosan (587 m), a mountain beside the U.S. Army base Camp Casey. It is on this mountain, at the Jajae'am Hermitage, that the Buddhist Saint Wonhyo is said to have reached enlightenment.

The ground level station was closed on December 15, 2023 at the last train, and the new elevated station opened the next day, as part of the Yeoncheon extension. This eliminated the tedious grade crossing that surrounded the rail entrance to the station.

== History ==
The station opened for business on January 11, 1976, and the station building was completed on September 21, 1982. This building was closed twenty-four years later, on May 7, 2006, and a temporary building erected in its place. Meanwhile, Line 1 of the Seoul Subway was being extended north through the city of Dongducheon, and Soyosan became its northern terminus, with a new station building completed, on December 15, 2006.

== Platform ==
No.	Line	Train	Bound
1	Gyeongwon Line	Seoul Subway Line 1	Dongducheon • Uijeongbu • Kwangwoon Univ. • Seoul station • Guro • Bupyeong • Incheon

== Passenger statistics ==
Line	Ridership				Ref.
Line	Y2006	Y2007	Y2008	Y2009	Ref.
Line 1	2226	2830	3079	3219	

== Exit ==
No.	Direction	Bus
1	Soyosan / Soyo Branch Fire Substation / Soyosan Pleasure Ground / Jayusuhopeyonghwa Museum	36 36-5 37 39 39-1 39-4 39-5 50-5 53 53-1 53-2 53-3 53-5 53-6 53-7 53-8 53-9 54

== Photos ==
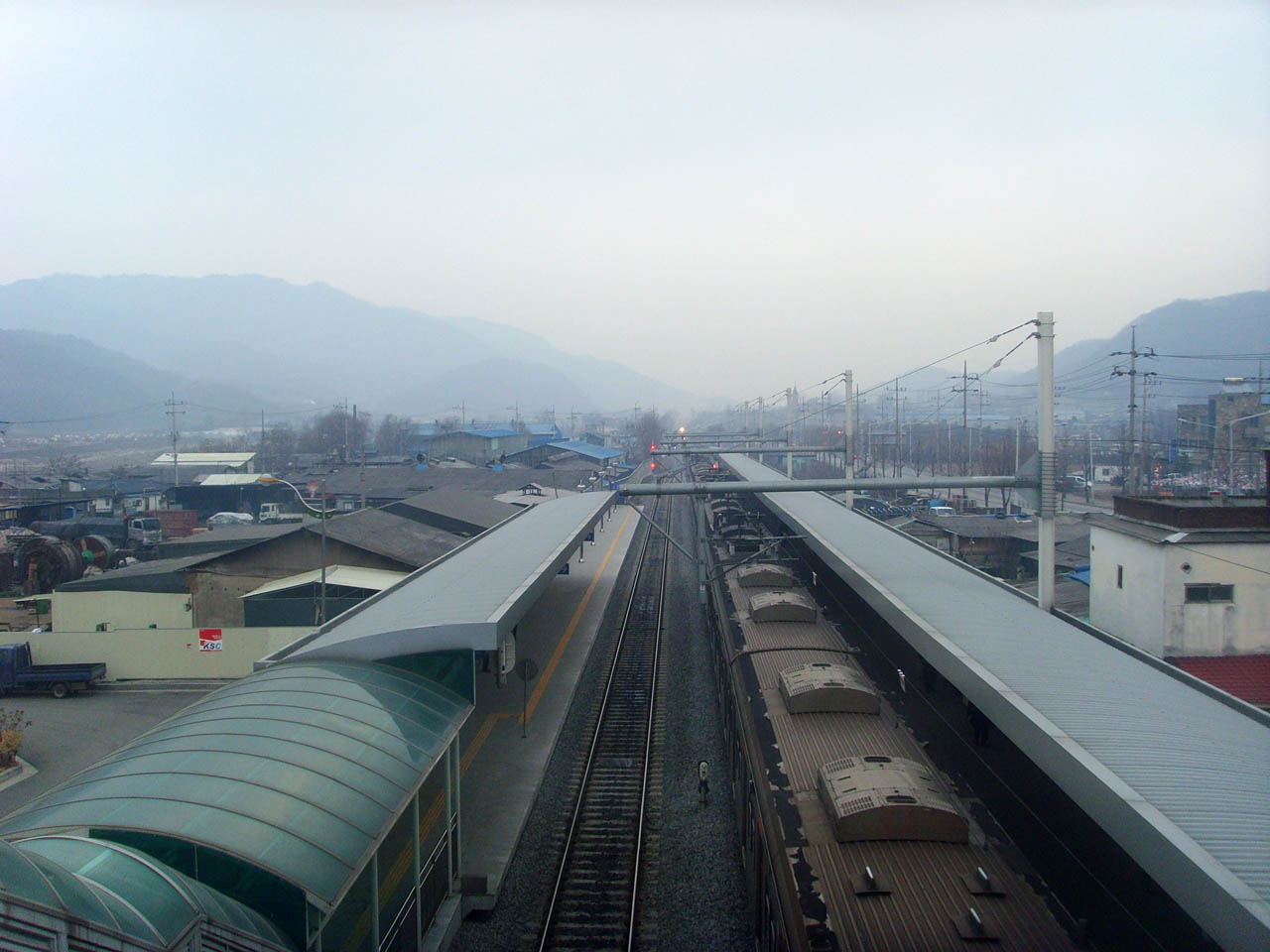
Soyosan station (before Yeoncheon extension)

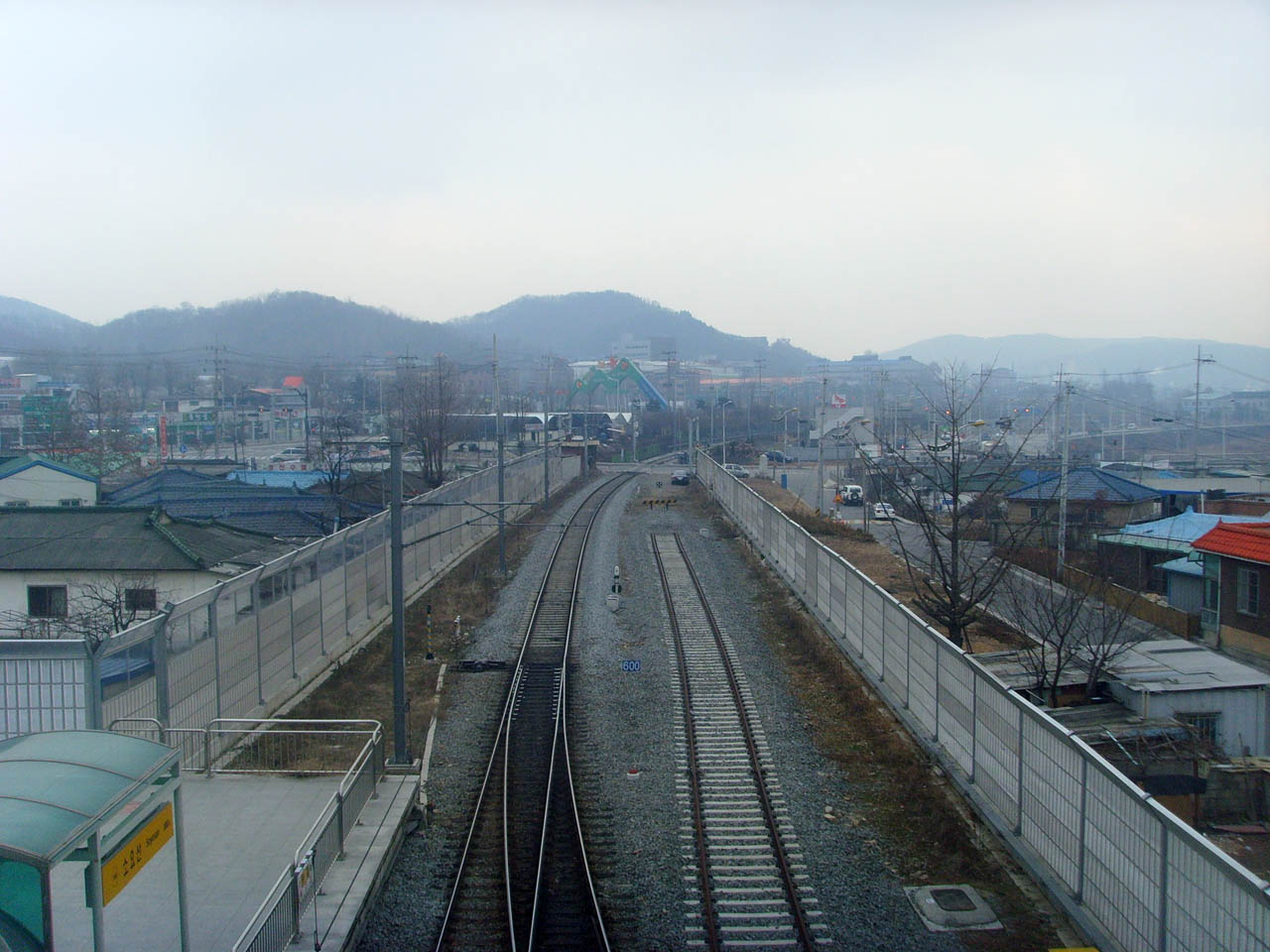
Dongducheon direction (before Yeoncheon extension)

Station building, at night

Waiting room

New Platform, Yeoncheon direction
