= Dongducheon station =

Metro station in Dongducheon, South Korea

동두천; Dongducheon
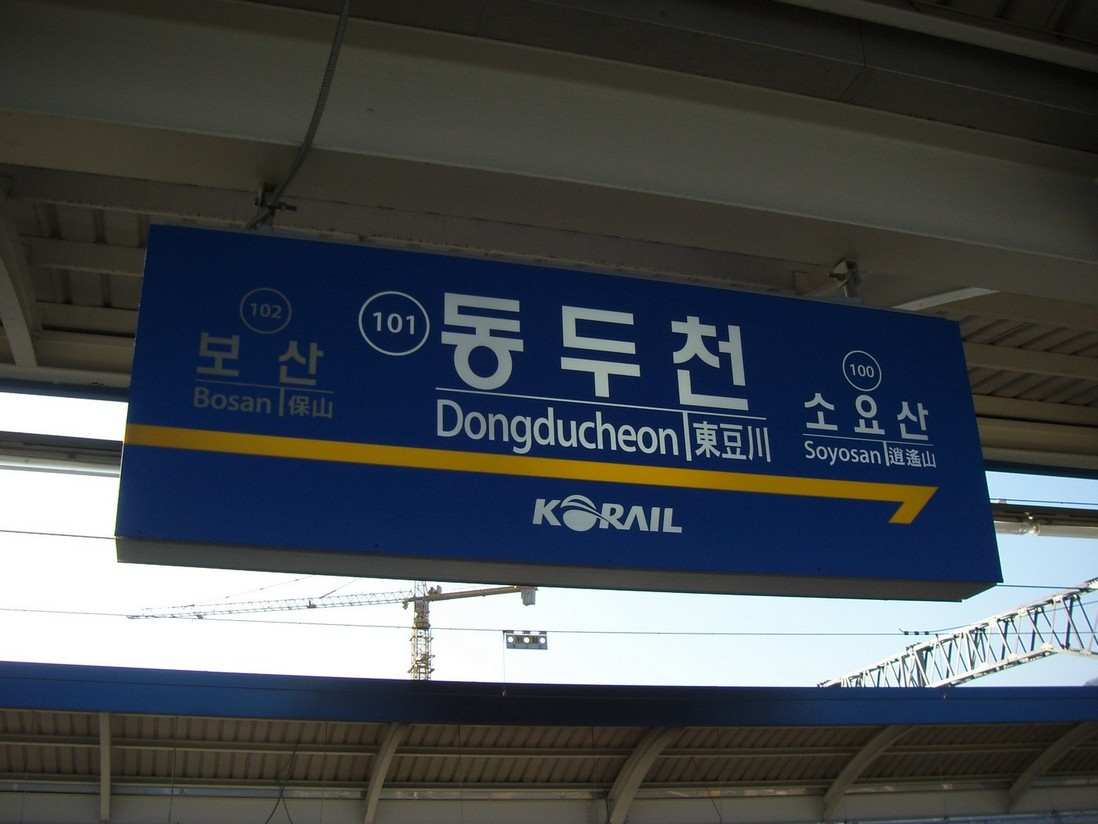
- Station Sign

Korean name
- Hangul: 동두천역
- Hanja: 東豆川驛
- Revised Romanization: Dongducheonnyeok
- McCune–Reischauer: Tongduch'ŏnnyŏk

General information
- Location: 245-210 Dongducheon-dong, 2687 Pyeonghwa-ro, Dongducheon-si, Gyeonggi-do; South Korea
- Coordinates: 37°55′40″N 127°03′17″E
- Operator: Korail
- Line: Gyeongwon Line
- Platforms: 2
- Tracks: 4

Construction
- Structure type: Aboveground

History
- Opened: July 25, 1912; December 15, 2006
- Former names: Dongan

Passengers
- Based on Jan-Dec of 2012. KR: 1,481; Line 1: 5,401

Services
Preceding station	Seoul Metropolitan Subway	Following station
Soyosan towards Yeoncheon	Line 1	Bosan towards Incheon
Terminus	Line 1 Gyeongwon Express	Dongducheon Jungang towards Incheon
Location

Dongducheon Station (Korean: 동두천역; formerly Dongan station) is a metro station located in Dongducheon, South Korea. Seoul Subway Line 1 serves this station, and it is the terminus station for Gyeongwon Line express trains. Camp Casey, a U.S. Army military base, is located nearby.

- Dongducheon Station opened for business on July 25, 1912, and was the terminal station of the Gyeongwon Line in South Korea for a short time due to the division of the North and South. Later, with the double-track electrification of the Gyeongwon Line, it served as the starting and ending station for the Gyeongwon Line commuter train. It is currently the terminal station of Seoul Metropolitan Subway Line 1. The station name is derived from the name of Dongducheon, which originates in the east of Tap-dong, Dongducheon-si and flows into Ganghwacheon. The old name of Dongducheon was Gajeongjari. However, after the opening of the Gyeongwon Line and the Japanese colonial period, it was changed to Dongdunae and Dongducheon, which means that the stream flows from the east. However, the actual station location was far from the newly formed downtown Dongducheon, and as the newly built Eosu-dong Station increased in usage, the name of Dongducheon Station was ceded to Eosu-dong Station in 1983, and the name was changed to Dongan Station. Afterwards, in December 2006, when Dongducheon Station became the terminal station of Seoul Metropolitan Subway Line 1, it was reverted to Dongducheon Station for the convenience of train users and to improve regional awareness. Eosu-dong Station, which briefly used the name of Dongducheon Station, was changed to Dongducheon Jungang Station.

== Platforms ==
- Platform 1: to Ganeung / Seoul Station / Incheon
- Platform 2: to Hoegi (Rapid Line)
- Platform 4: Termination Platform
- Platform 5: No Service (Suspended)
- Platform 6: No Service (Suspended)

== Exits ==
- Exit 1: Dongan Protection Center, Dongducheon Je 2-gyo, Soyo-dong Community Center
- Exit 2: Dongbo Elementary School, Sinheung Middle School, Shinheung High School, Dongducheon Industry Complex, Anheunggyo
