= Incheon station =

Railway station in Incheon, South Korea

인천; Incheon
인천; Incheon
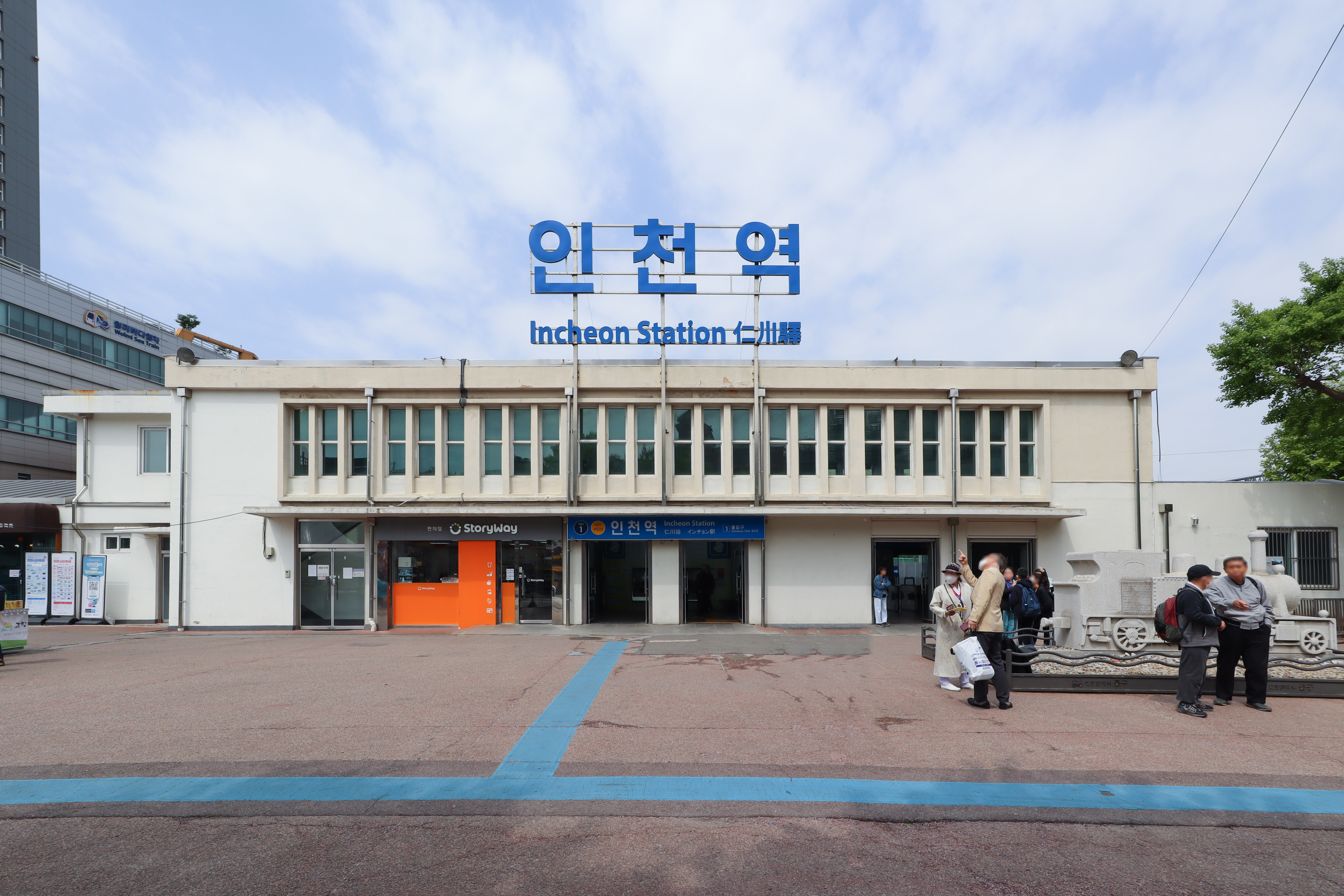
- The station entrance in 2023

Korean name
- Hangul: 인천역
- Hanja: 仁川驛
- RR: Incheon-yeok
- MR: Inch'ŏn-yŏk

General information
- Location: 3-1 Bukseong-dong 1-ga, 307-2 Jemullyangno, Jemulpo District, Incheon
- Coordinates: 37°28′33″N 126°37′01″E
- Operator: Korail
- Lines: Gyeongin Line, Suin–Bundang Line
- Platforms: 2 (Line 1); 2 (Suin–Bundang Line)
- Tracks: 3 (Line 1); 2 (Suin–Bundang Line)
- Bus routes: Blue bus routes 2, 10, 15, 28, and 45; Yellow bus route 307; Green bus route Incheon e-Eum 1

Construction
- Structure type: ● Line 1: Aboveground ● Suin-Bundang Line: Underground

History
- Opened: September 18, 1899

Key dates
- August 15, 1974: Line 1 opened
- February 27, 2016: Suin–Bundang Line opened

Passengers
- (Daily) Based on Jan-Dec of 2012. Line 1: 7,642
Services
Preceding station	Seoul Metropolitan Subway	Following station
Dongincheon towards Yeoncheon	Line 1	Terminus
Dongincheon towards Dongducheon	Line 1 Gyeongwon Express	Terminus
Sinpo towards Cheongnyangni	Suin–Bundang Line	Terminus
Inha University towards Oido	Suin–Bundang Line Suin Express Line	Terminus
Location

Incheon station (Note: Historically romanized as Inchon station) (Korean: 인천역) is the western terminus railway station of the Suin–Bundang and Gyeongin lines of the Seoul Metropolitan Subway. The station is in the Bukseong neighborhood of the Jemulpo District, Incheon, South Korea and is approximately 20 kilometers west of Seoul. Established in 1899 under the Korean Empire as Chemulpo station (Note: Sometimes romanized Jemulpo) (제물포역; 濟物浦驛), the station is the oldest train station in the Seoul Capital Area. During the Japanese occupation of Korea, the station was briefly named Hainchon station (하인천역; 下仁川驛) and the original station building was destroyed during the Korean War. Service for the old Suin Line began in 1937 and ended in 1995; the new Suin Line (later merged as the Suin–Bundang Line) was extended to the station in 2016. Service for the Gyeongin Line began in 1974.

== History ==
Chemulpo in 1908

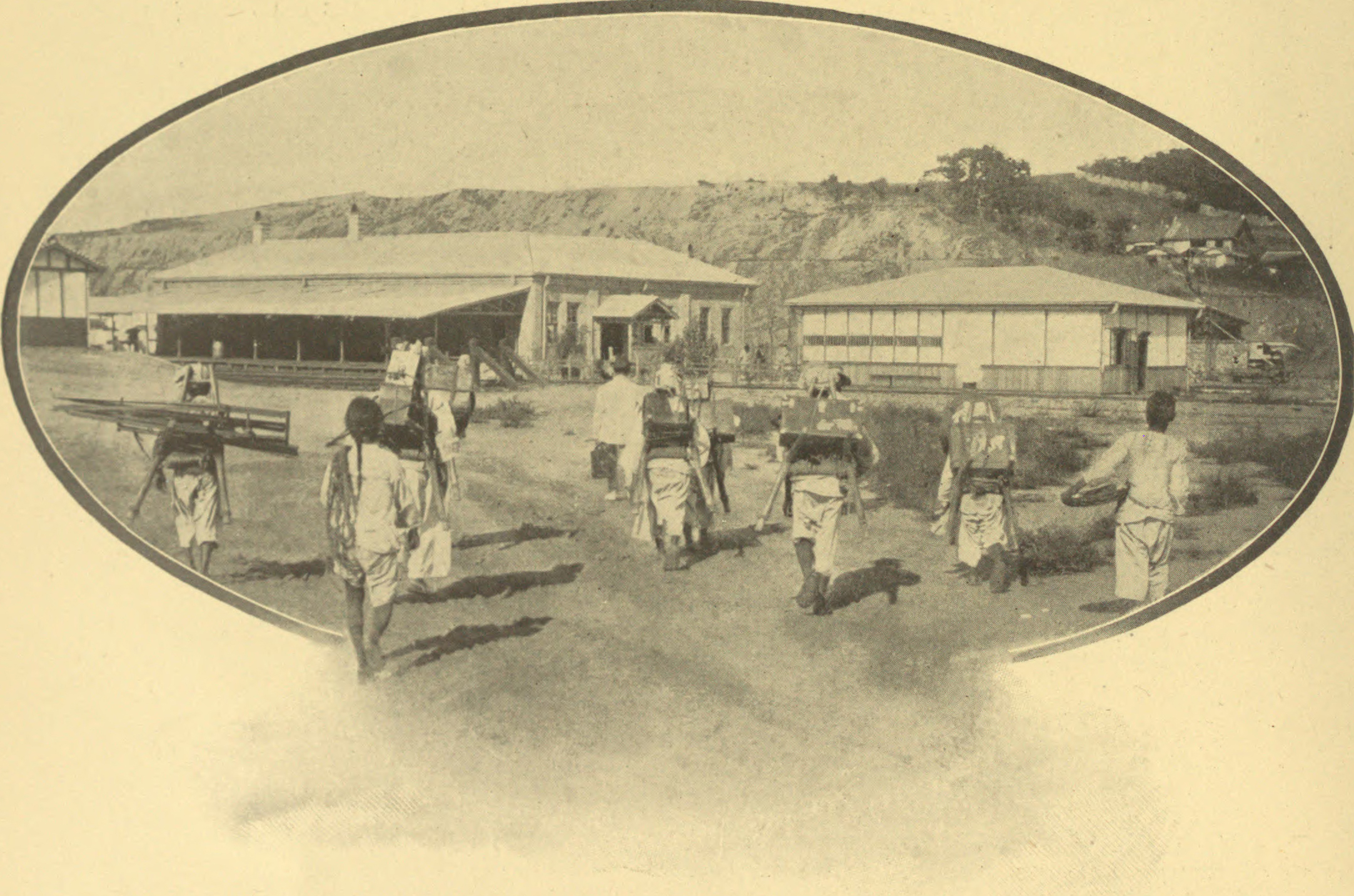
The station building

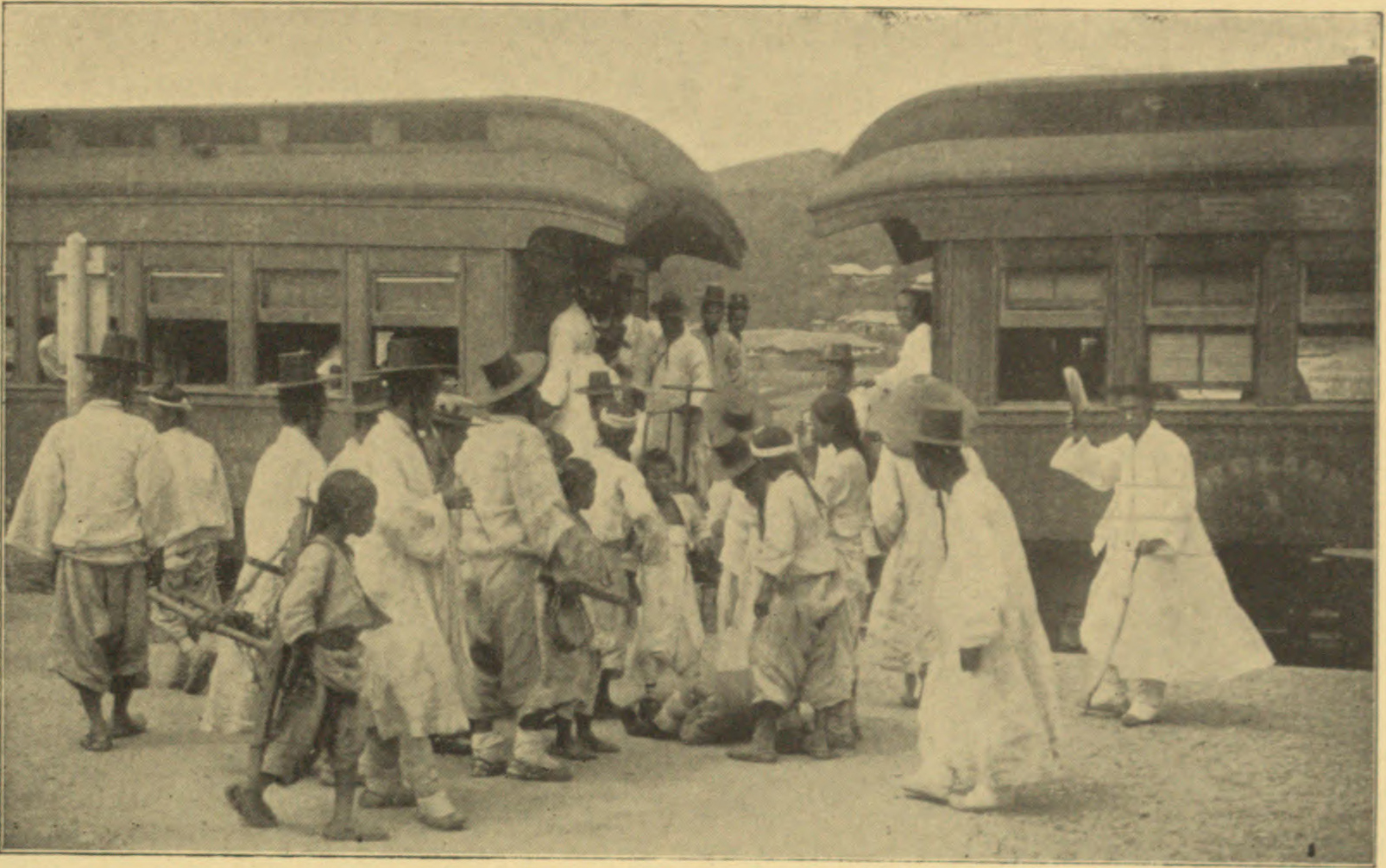
American railway cars at the station

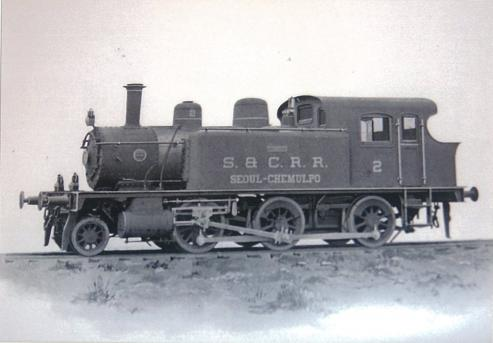
The Sentetsu Mogai-class locomotives used by the Seoul & Chemulpo Railroad

=== Construction ===
In 1896, Gojong of Korea gave the construction rights for a train line from Seoul to Jemulpo to American financier James R. Morse under the condition that it would be returned to the government in 15 years. In return, the Korean government provided government land and purchased privately owned land for Morse's company. This was done in an attempt to keep the station from being appropriated by the Empire of Japan. When construction for the railway began in 1897, the station was originally planned to be built in the Takpo (탁포) area, but complaints from local residents led the Korean government to instead reclaim tidal land by the Incheon port for the station. In 1899, the company ran out of funds and the rights to the station were sold to the Japanese Gyeongin Railway before construction was finished.

The station opened to the public on September 18, 1899 under the name Chemulpo station (제물포역; 濟物浦驛) and was serviced by the Gyeongin Railway which operated trains from the station to Noryangjin station in Seoul. The completion of the Hangang Railway Bridge in July 1900 later expanded service to Seoul Station. The construction of the Gyeongin Railway and Incheon station divided Incheon in half and limited development in the northern half of the city.

Ownership over the station aided Japan during the 1904–05 Russo-Japanese War. In 1926, the Empire of Japan changed the station name to Hainchon Station (하인천역; 下仁川驛) because of the station's proximity to the Incheon Supervisory Office. On June 1, 1948, the station name was changed to Incheon. The station building was destroyed during the Korean War, and a makeshift building was used until the opening of the current station building in September 1960. In 2011, the city temporarily gave the station the subname Chinatown (차이나타운).

=== Passenger rail service ===
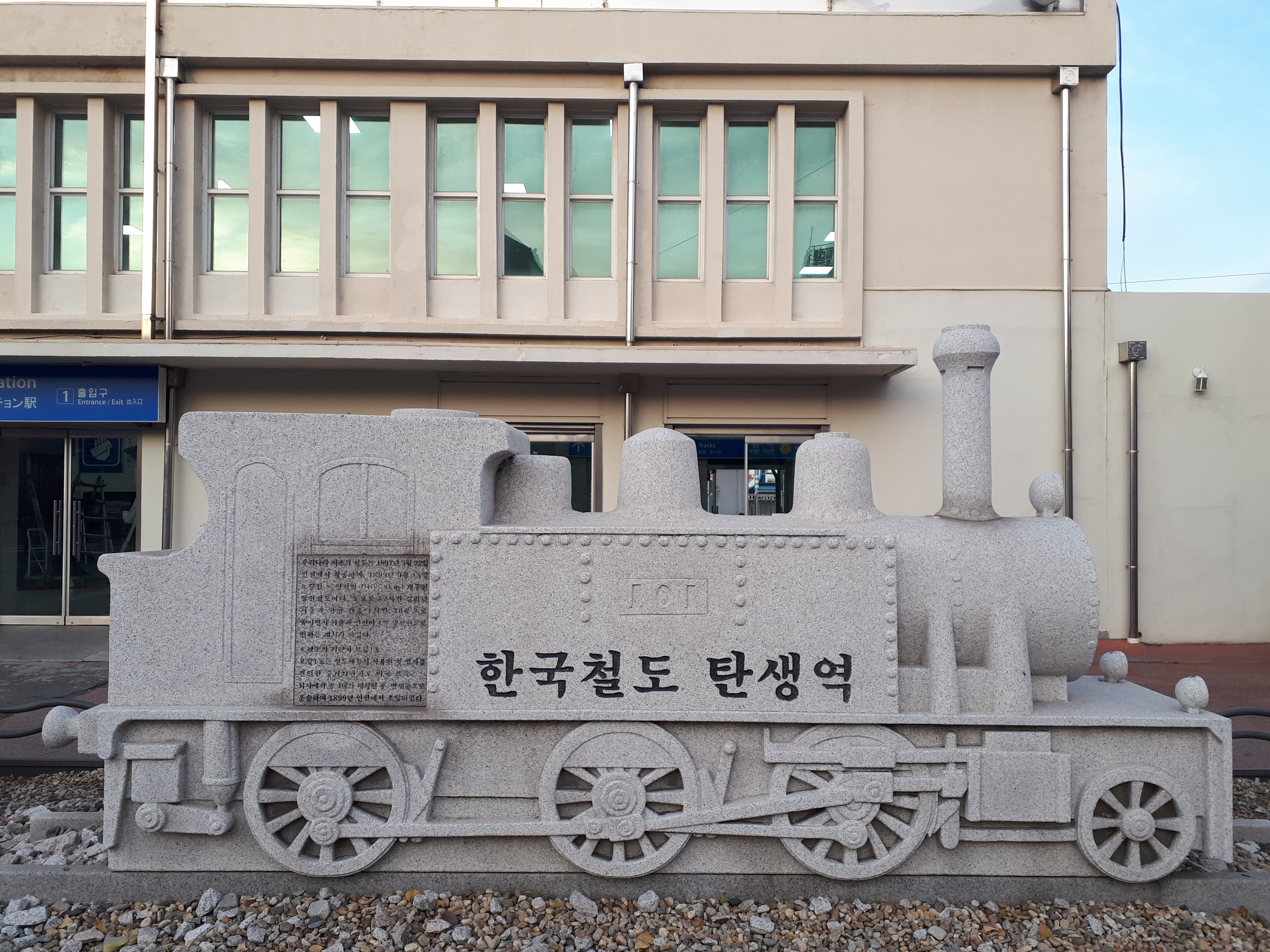
A sign at the station describes it as the birthplace of Korean rail.

In 1937, the Japanese Chosen Railway built the Suin Line to transport salt from the Sorae salt field in Incheon to Suwon. The narrow-gauge Suin Line operated until 1995, when the line was decommissioned to upgrade it into a standard-gauge railway. Incheon station was connected to the expanded Suin Line in 2016 during the second of three stages of construction. The third stage of construction finished in 2020, merging the Suin Line with the Bundang Line into the Suin–Bundang Line and connecting Suwon to Incheon by rail for the first time in 25 years.

Service on the Seoul Subway Line 1 began in 1974, replacing Gyeongin Line services. Construction between 1991 and 2005 expanded the line to be double tracked.

Ridership has declined from an average of 20,000 daily riders in the 1970s to fewer than 10,000 daily riders in 2023.

=== Other services ===
Freight rail service at Incheon station ended in 2020 as a result of rising logistics costs and a greater focus on passenger rail service. Deliveries of bituminous coal were redirected to the northern Pohang station.

On October 8, 2019, a connection was opened between Incheon station and the Wolmi Sea Train tourist monorail. The city had previously spent 85 billion won in 2009 constructing a connection between the station to Wolmido island, but operations for the line were suspended due to faulty construction.

== Location ==
The station is adjacent to Incheon Chinatown, which was founded by Chinese merchants who arrived in Incheon's port after it opened to foreign trade in 1883. The station is also adjacent to Freedom Park, Incheon Harbor, Wolmido island, and the Songwol-dong Fairy Tale Village.

Connecting bus services include Seoul blue bus routes 2, 10, 15, 28, and 45, Seoul yellow bus route 307, and Seoul green bus route Incheon e-Eum 1.

== In popular culture ==
Incheon serves as the background of several shots in the 2001 South Korean romantic comedy film My Sassy Girl.

== Gallery ==
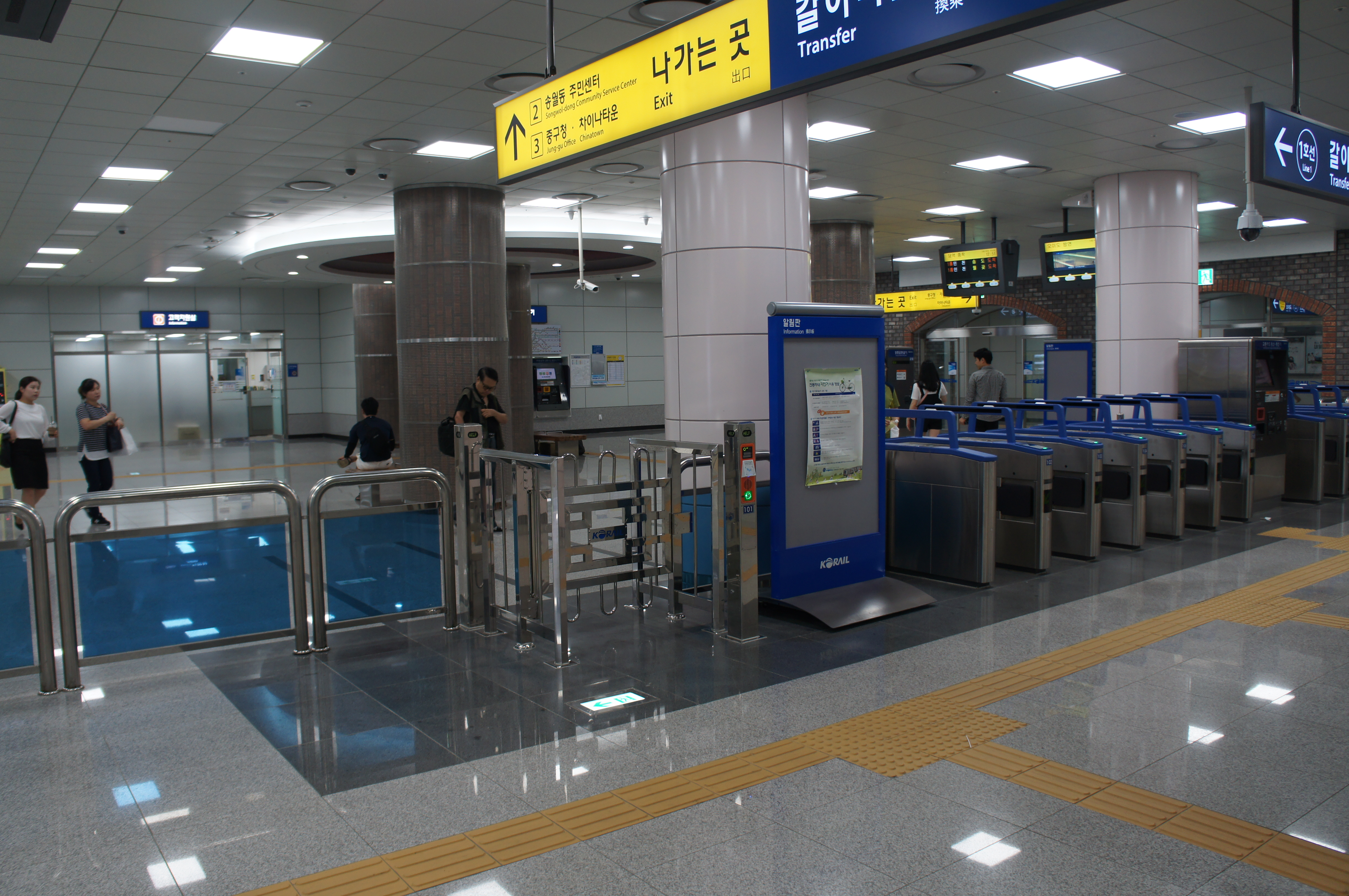
Station interior

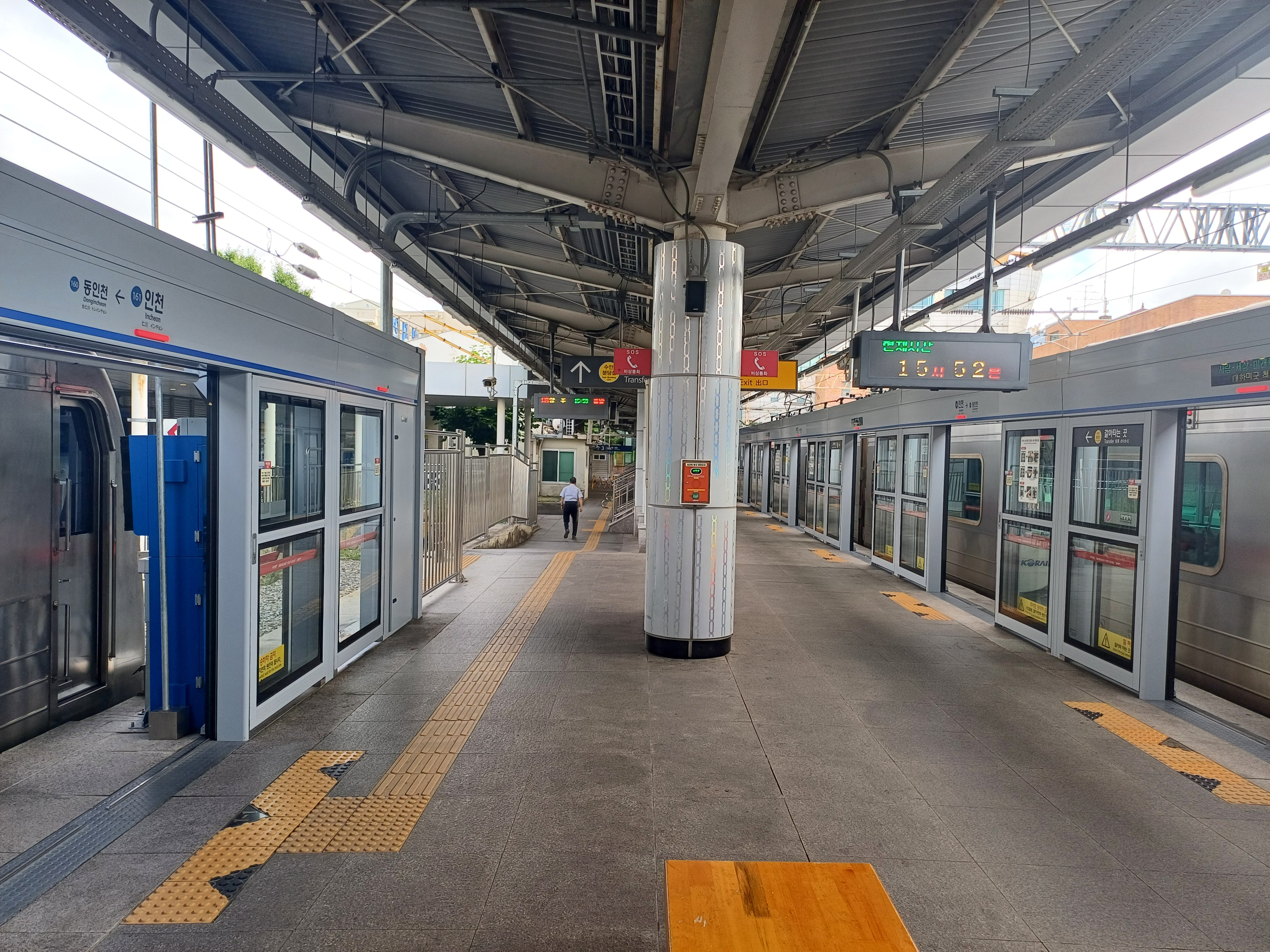
Above-ground platform (Line 1)

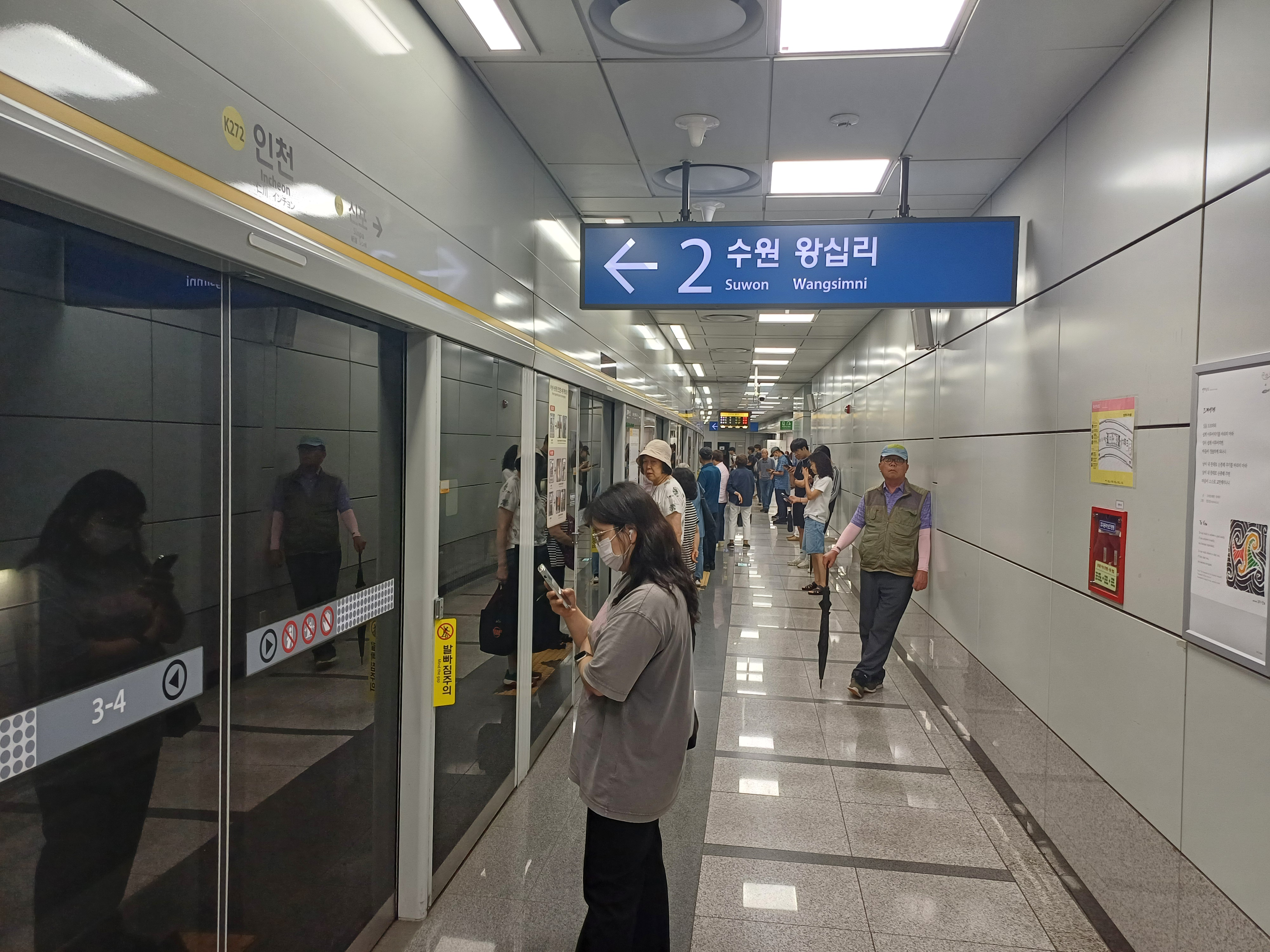
Underground platform (Suin-Bundang Line)
