= Sintan-ri station =

Railway station in South Korea

신탄리
Sintan-ri
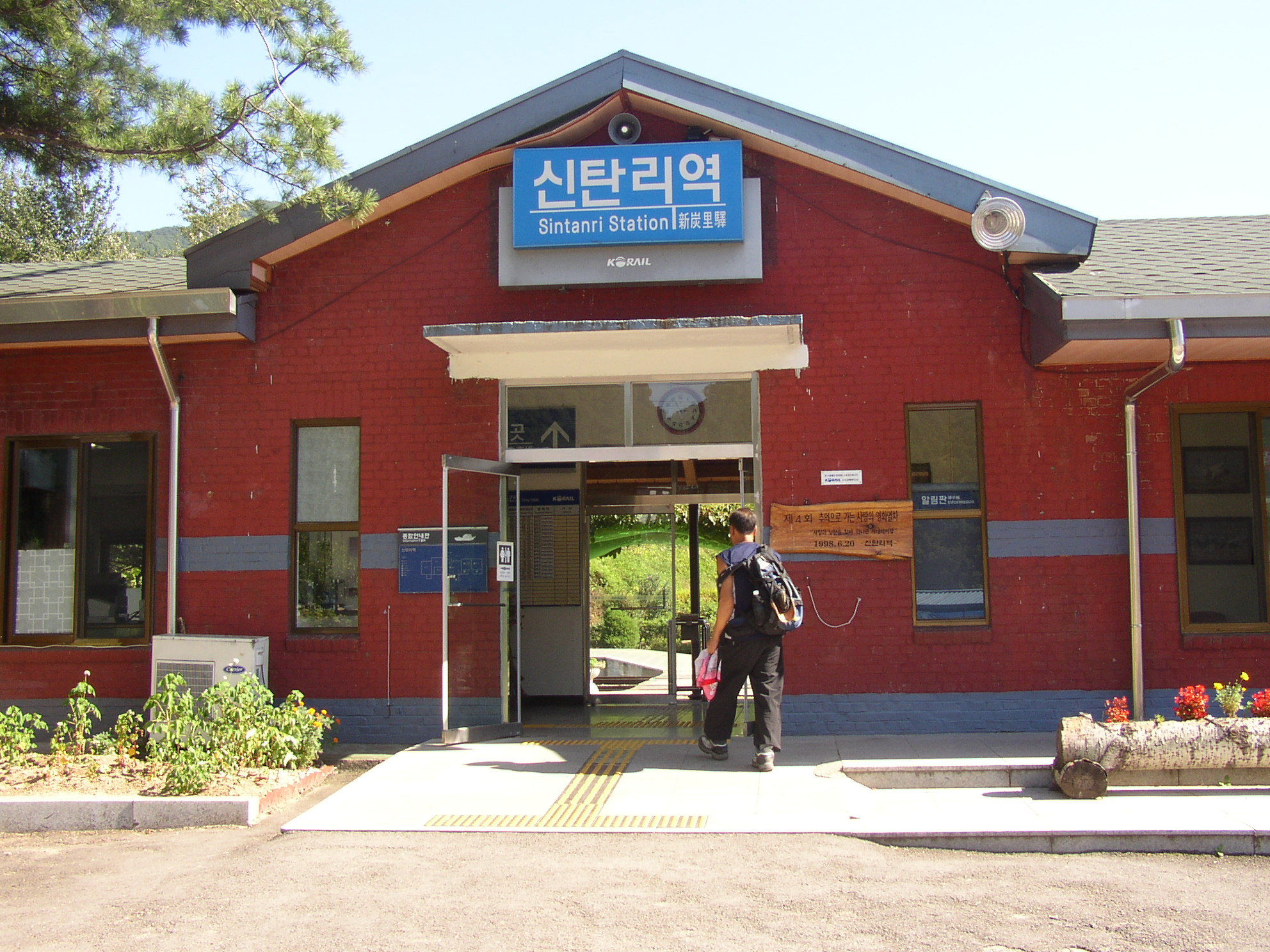
- Station entrance

Korean name
- Hangul: 신탄리역
- Hanja: 新炭里驛
- RR: Sintalli-yeok
- MR: Sint'alli-yŏk

General information
- Location: 4 Godaesan-gil, Sinseo-myeon, Yeoncheon County, Gyeonggi Province; South Korea
- Coordinates: 38°12′46.68″N 127°8′22.87″E
- Operator: Korail
- Line: Gyeongwon Line
- Platforms: 2
- Tracks: 1

Construction
- Structure type: Surface

History
- Opened: December 1, 1942
Location

Sintan-ri station is a railway station on the Gyeongwon Line in South Korea.

Sintan-ri station was among the first 100 railway stations to issue and display Korea Railroad 100th Anniversary Commemorative Stamps in 1999.Those stamps reflect the characteristics of each station, and were created in 1999 by the Korea Railroad Administration as part of a project to commemorate the 100th anniversary of rail transport in Korea.

== History ==
At the time of its opening, it was a signal station, and because it is located north of the 38th parallel, it belonged to the North Korea before the Korean War. After the Military Demarcation Line was created, it was transferred to South Korea and became the terminus of the Gyeongwon Line. It was promoted to an ordinary station in 1954. Usually, there are many hikers for the nearby Godaesan Mountain, and buses to Dongducheon City and Cheorwon County run in front of the station. From July 2, 2018 to December 1, 2018, a temporary shuttle bus was operated between Yeoncheon and Baengmagoji due to track improvement work.

Operations were completely suspended on July 27, 2011 due to track loss caused by heavy rains in the central region, but resumed on March 21, 2012 with the resumption of Gyeongwon Line commuter train service.

From July 2 to December 1, 2018, due to improvement work on the Gyeongwon Line between Yeoncheon and Baengmagoji stations, station operations were again temporarily suspended, and a temporary shuttle bus was operated.

From April 1, 2019 to December 14, 2023, commuter train service was suspended due to the doubling and electrification work of the Gyeongwon Line between Dongducheon Station and Yeoncheon Station, and replacement buses were operated. However, after the completion of the aforementioned work, commuter train stocks were all phased out due to the expiration of their service life, and hence the commuter train service did not restart. Replacement buses were also discontinued on December 16, 2023. Therefore, the bus number 39 or G2001 running from Yeoncheon-gun, or bus number 13 running from Cheorwon-gun has to be used to reach this station.

== Timeline ==
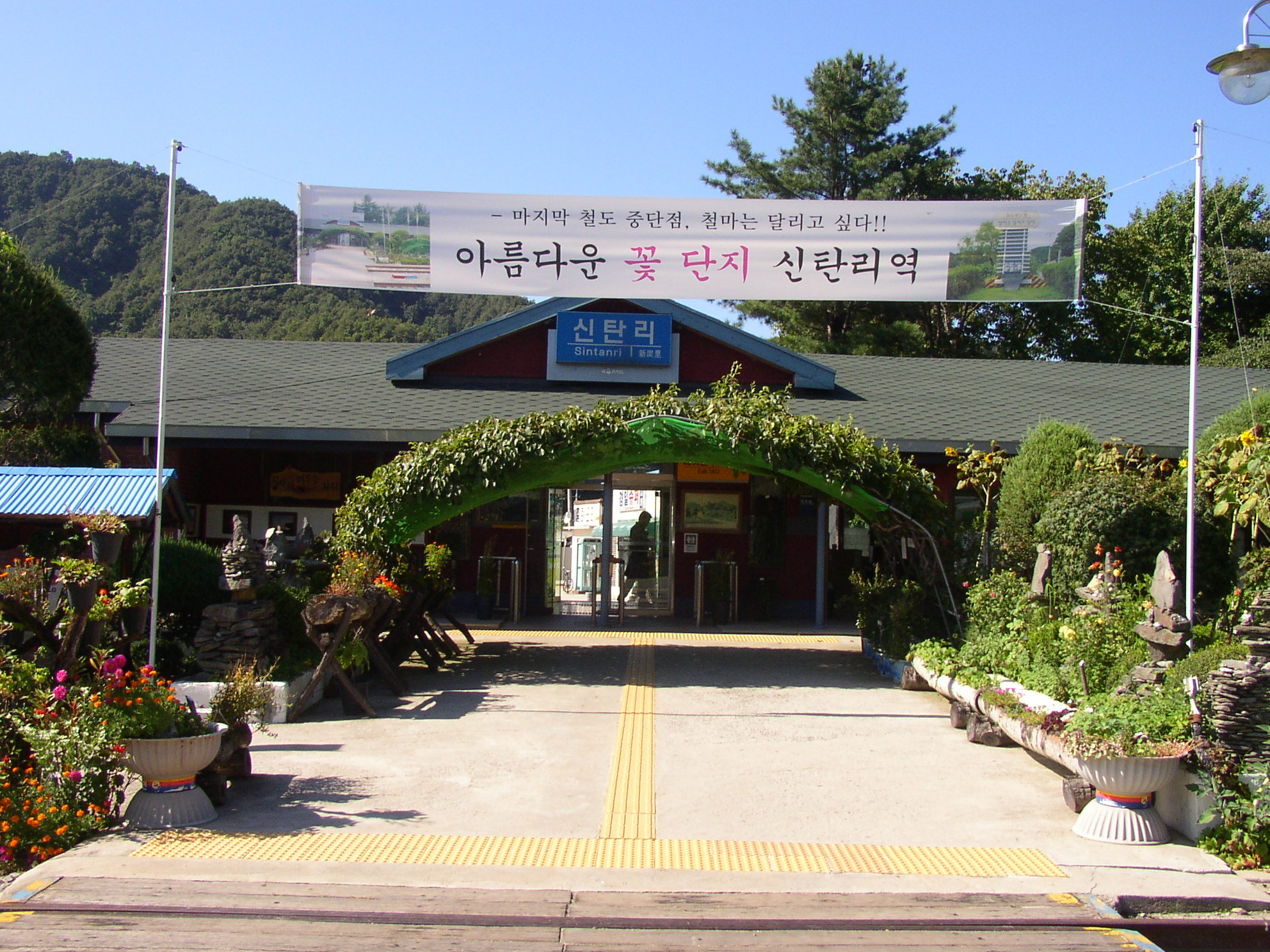
Sintan-ri Station (view from the boarding area)

- December 1, 1942: Opened as a signal station
- July 1, 1954: Promoted from signal station to regular station
- August 10, 1955: Train service resumed
- December 30, 1961: Completion of the current station
- November 3, 1971: Installation of a railroad breakpoint sign.
- September 1, 1991: Discontinued handling of small parcels
- January 11, 1994: Cargo handling ceased
- July 28, 2011: Temporary suspension of operations due to track damage caused by heavy rain.
- March 21, 2012: Commuter train service resumed with the completion of the Chosung Bridge, and the number of one-way trains was reduced to six per day.
- July 1, 2012: Increased services by 6 per way
- August 1, 2012: Three-car commuter trains on the Gyeongwon Line began operating.
- November 20, 2012: Opening of the Sintan-ri - Baengmagoji extension and installation of signs indicating the railway's end point.
- April 14, 2014: Commuter train service reduced to 11 trips each way.
- August 1, 2014: The Peace Train (DMZ Train) begins operation.
- December 9, 2016: Commuter train service adjustments (weekdays: 11 trains, weekends/holidays: 9 trains)
- March 1, 2018: Commuter train service adjustments (Weekdays: 14 trains, Weekends/Holidays: 12 trains)
- March 14 - April 12, 2018: Four-car commuter trains on the Gyeongwon Line resumed service.
- July 2, 2018 - December 1, 2018 : Commuter train service between Yeoncheon and Baengmagoji was suspended due to construction on the Gyeongwon Line bridge. Replacement buses were operated.
- March 31, 2019: Last commuter train service on the Gyeongwon Line.
- April 1, 2019 - December 15, 2023: Commuter train service between Dongducheon and Baengmagoji was suspended due to doubling of that section of Gyeongwon Line. Replacement buses operated 46 times daily.
- December 16, 2023: Gyeongwon Line replacement bus service (Dongducheon to Baengmagoji) was discontinued. Replacement buses started to operate between Yeoncheon Station (non-stop) and Baengmagoji Station.
- January 14, 2024: Replacement bus service between Yeoncheon Station (non-stop) and Baengmagoji Station was discontinued.
- January 15, 2024: Cheorwon Bus No. 13 extended to Sintan-ri Station.
- January 25, 2024: Replacement bus service opened between Sintan-ri Station and Yeoncheon Station (via Sinmang-ri and Daegwang-ri stations).
- July 1, 2024: Replacement bus service between Sintan-ri Station and Yeoncheon Station was discontinued.

== Station layout ==
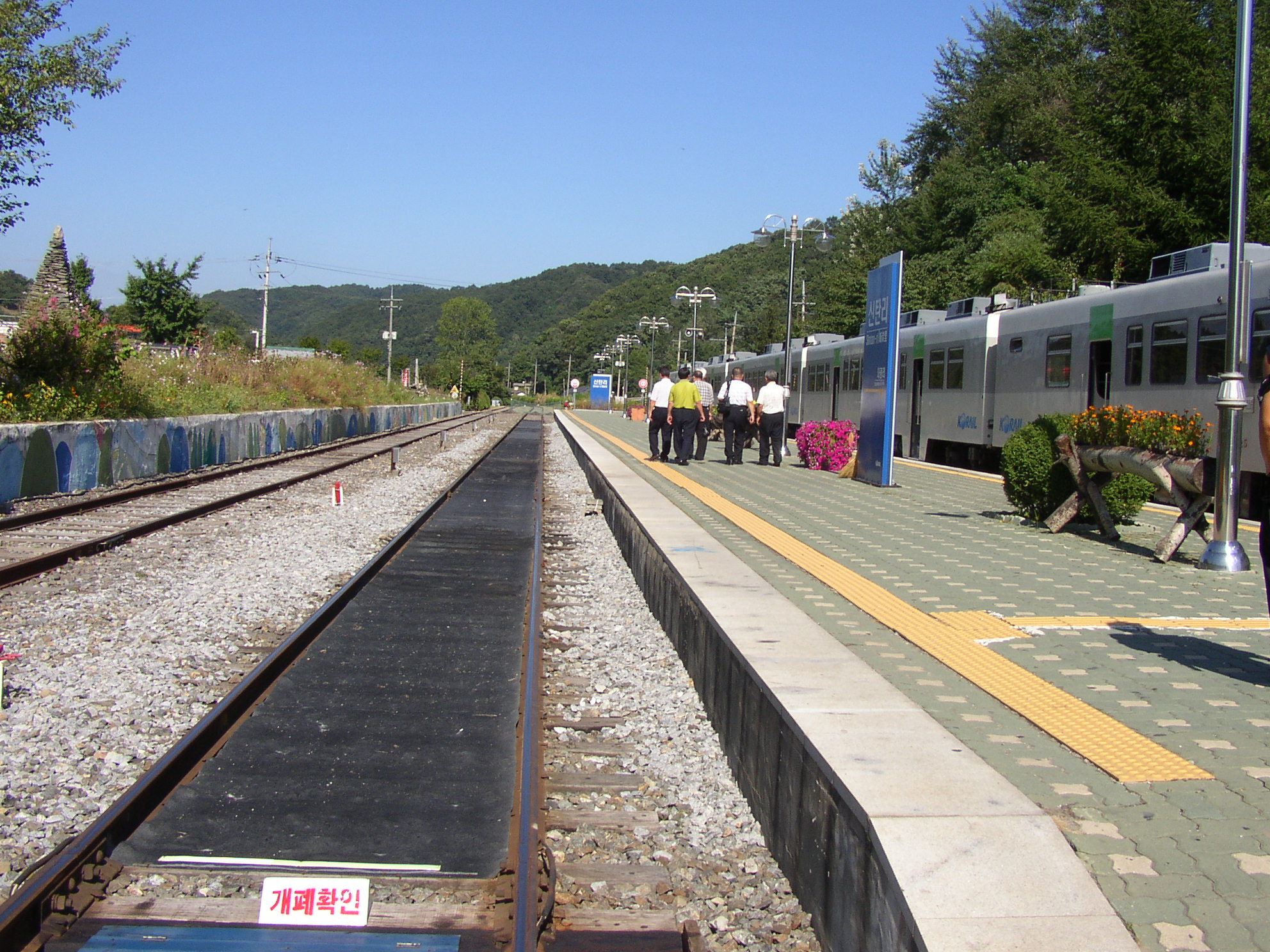
Platform of Sintan-ri Station

↑Daegwang-ri
| 1 2 |
Baengmagoji↓

1	Platform	Yeoncheon direction
2	Platform	Baengmagoji direction

== Adjacent Stations ==
Preceding station	Korail	Following station
Baengmagoji; Terminus	Commuter Train (currently suspended)	Daegwang-ri; Towards Yeoncheon
Baengmagoji; Terminus	DMZ Train (currently suspended)	Yeoncheon; Towards Seoul
