= Daegwang-ri station =

Railway station in South Korea

대광리
Daegwang-ri
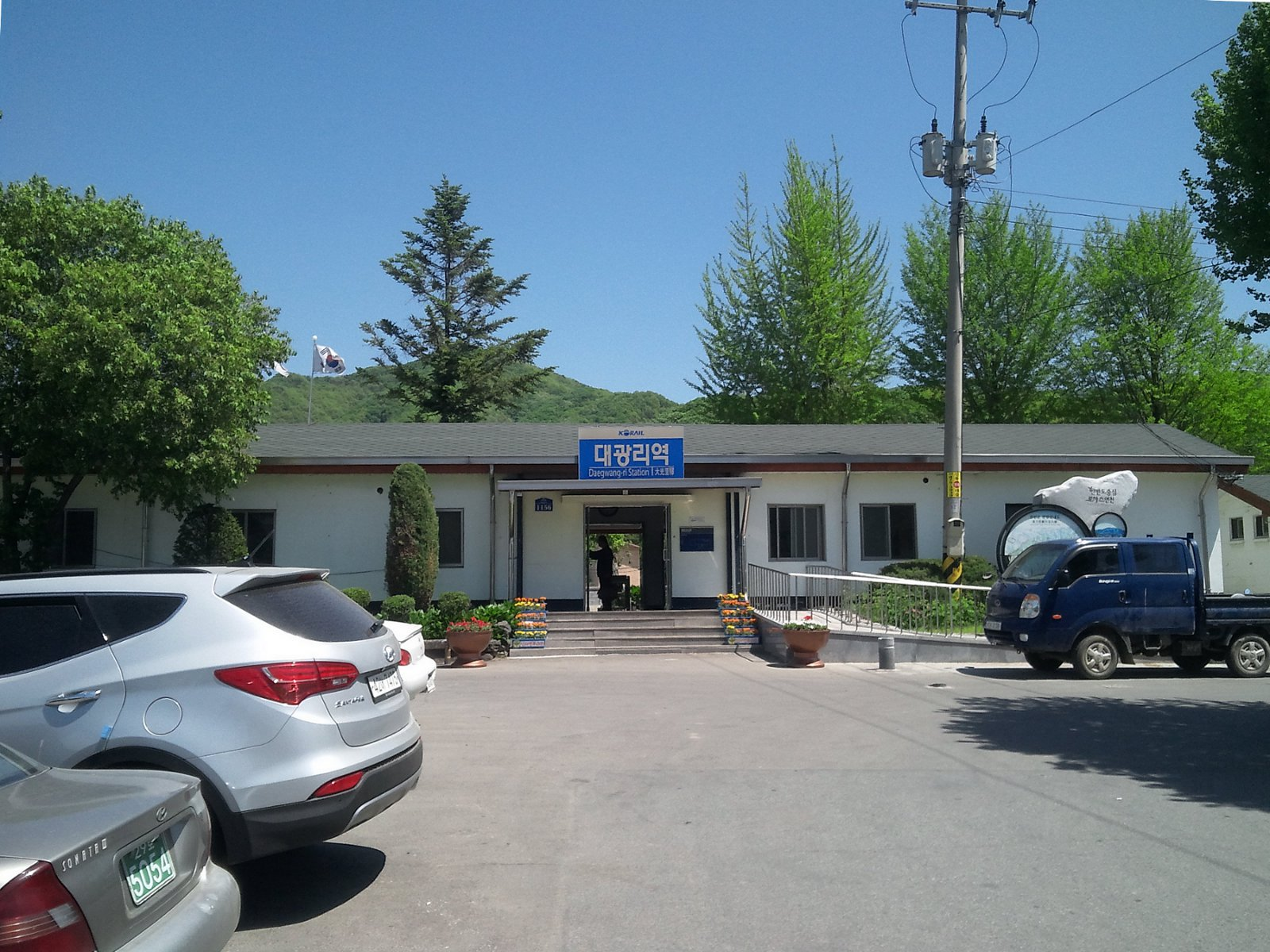
- Daegwang-ri Station in 2013

Korean name
- Hangul: 대광리역
- Hanja: 大光里驛
- RR: Daegwangni-yeok
- MR: Taegwangni-yŏk

General information
- Location: 1156 Yeonsin-ro, Sinseo-myeon, Yeoncheon County, Gyeonggi Province; South Korea
- Coordinates: 38°11′0.28″N 127°6′28.38″E
- Operator: Korail
- Line: Gyeongwon Line
- Platforms: 2
- Tracks: 1

Construction
- Structure type: Surface

History
- Opened: October 21, 1912
Location

Daegwang-ri station (Korean: 대광리역; Hanja: 大光里驛) is a railway station on the Gyeongwon Line in South Korea. The station is 84.3 km from Yongsan station, 7.0 km from Sinmang-ri station (the next station towards Yeoncheon) and 4.4 km from Sintan-ri station (the next station towards Baengmagoji).

Contrary to its name, the station is located in Dosin-ri, and only some of its facilities are in Daegwang-ri.

== Timeline ==
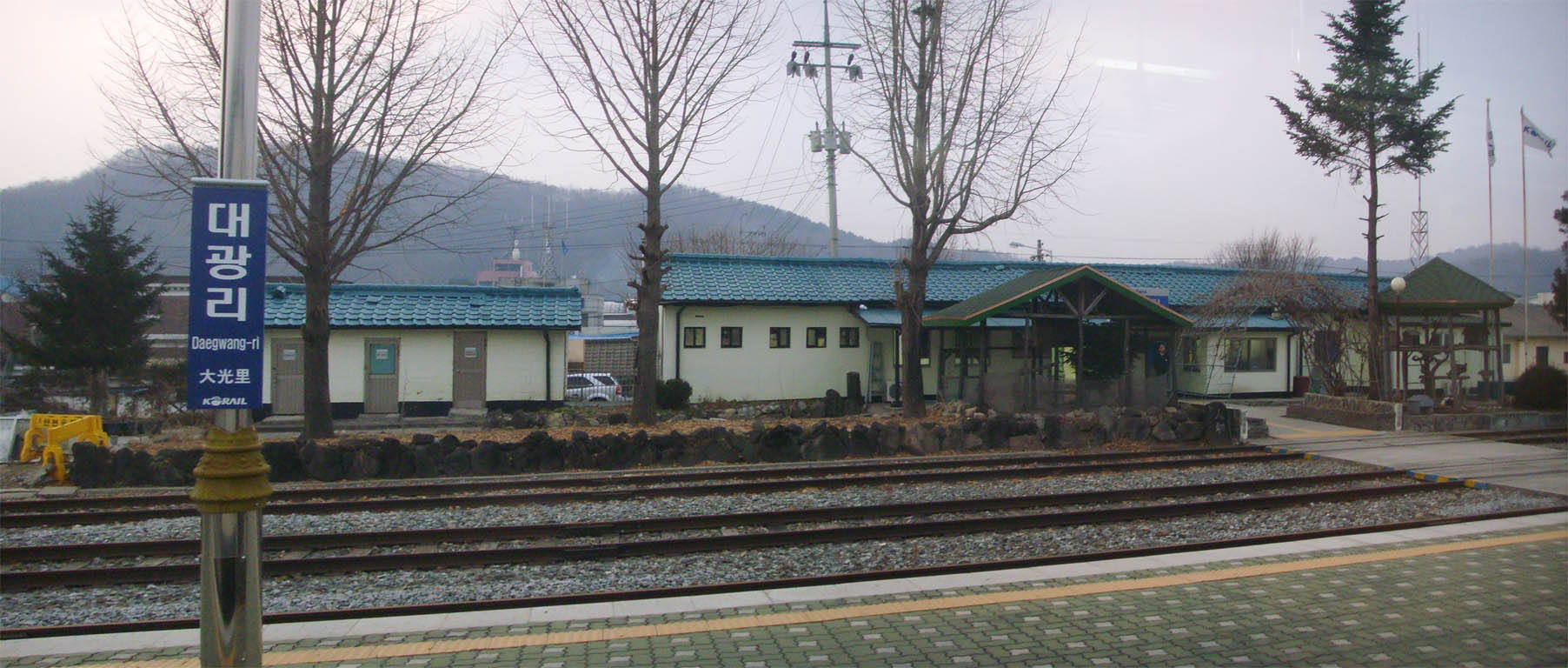
Daegwang-ri station in 2007

- October 21, 1912: Opening
- December 1, 2008: Designated as a station for on-board ticket service and ticket machines were removed.
- July 28, 2011: Train service suspended due to track loss caused by heavy rains in central South Korea in July 2011.
- March 21, 2012: Train service resumed, with 11 services each way per day.
- July 2012: Increased the number of services to 17 per day.
- July 20, 2015: Downgraded to an unmanned station
- July 1, 2018: Gyeongwon Line Yeoncheon ~ Baengmagoji section service temporarily suspended due to track improvement work.
- December 2, 2018: Gyeongwon Line Yeoncheon ~ Baengmagoji section service resumed.
- April 1, 2019: Gyeongwon Line service suspended between Dongducheon and Yeoncheon due to electrification work. Replacement buses operate 46 times daily.

== Around the station ==
- Sinseo-myeon Administrative Welfare Center
- Sinseo Police Station
- Daegwang Post Office
- Yeoncheon Agricultural Cooperative (Sinseo Branch)
- Yeoncheon Fire Station (Sinseo 119 Regional Unit)
- Nonghyup Hanaro Mart (New Bookstore)
- Daegwang Middle School
- Daegwang Elementary School
- Sinseo-myeon Community Center
- Paju Yeoncheon Livestock Cooperative (Yeoncheon Branch)
- Sinseo Health Center

== Adjacent Stations ==
Preceding station	Korail	Following station
Sintan-ri; Towards Baengmagoji	Commuter Train (currently suspended)	Sinmang-ri; Towards Yeoncheon
