= Sinmang-ri station =

Railway station in South Korea

신망리
Sinmang-ri
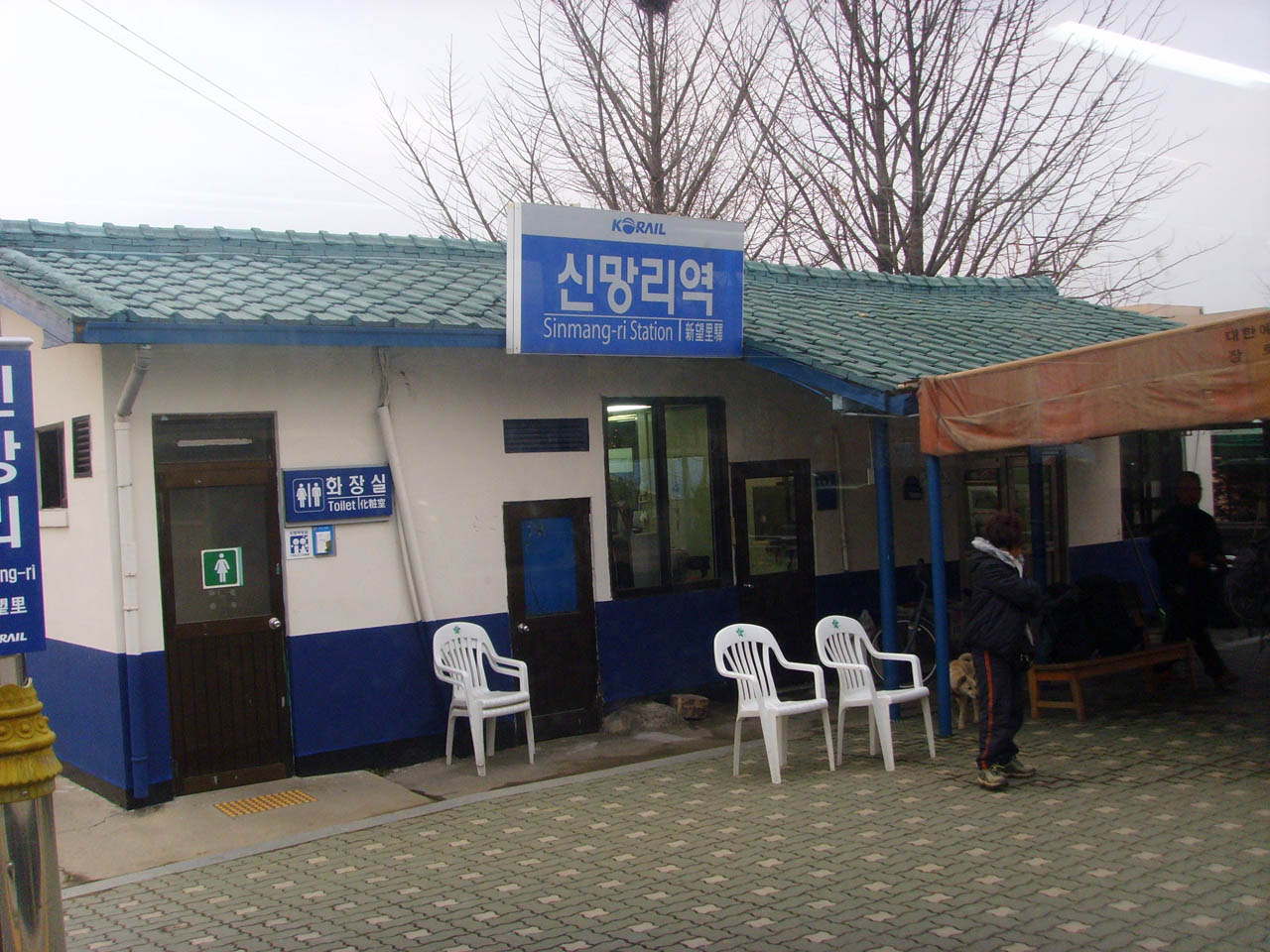
- Station entrance in 2007

Korean name
- Hangul: 신망리역
- Hanja: 新望里驛
- RR: Sinmangni-yeok
- MR: Sinmangni-yŏk

General information
- Location: 1 Yeonsin-ro, 483 Beon-gil, Yeoncheon-eup, Yeoncheon-gun, Gyeonggi-do; South Korea
- Coordinates: 38°12′46.68″N 127°8′22.87″E
- Operator: Korail
- Line: Gyeongwon Line
- Platforms: 2
- Tracks: 1

Construction
- Structure type: Surface

History
- Opened: August 21, 1956
Location

Sinmang-ri station is a railway station on the Gyeongwon Line located in Sang-ri, Yeoncheon-eup, Yeoncheon-gun, Gyeonggi-do, South Korea.

Sinmang-ri is a settlement established by the US military in 1954 for war refugees, and its name means New Hope Town.

From July 28, 2011, the operation was temporarily suspended due to track damage caused by heavy rains in central Korea in July 2011. On March 21, 2012, with the resumption of Gyeongwon Line commuter train service, number of commuter train service increased to 11 a day each way, and then increased to 17 after a timetable revision in July 2012.

== History ==
- August 21, 1956: Opened as a station with no staff
- August 11, 1964: Changed to a temporary station
- January 1, 1973: Downgraded to a station without a station attendant and designated as a Class B ticket office.
- January 1, 2009: Class B ticket booths closed.
- July 28, 2011: Temporary suspension of operations due to track loss caused by heavy rains in central Korea in July 2011.
- March 21, 2012: train service resumed with the completion of the Choseong Bridge, and the number of one-way trains was reduced to six per day.
- July 1, 2012: Increased commuter train service
- July 1, 2018: Gyeongwon Line Yeoncheon - Baengmagoji section service temporarily suspended due to track improvement work.
- December 2, 2018: Commuter train service on Yeoncheon - Baengmagoji section of the Gyeongwon Line resumed.
- April 1, 2019: Commuter train service suspended due to electrification work between Dongducheon and Yeoncheon. Replacement buses started to operate 32 times daily.

== Station Layout ==
↑Yeoncheon
| 1 2 |
Daegwang-ri↓

1	Platform	Yeoncheon direction
2	Platform	Baengmagoji direction

== Around the station ==
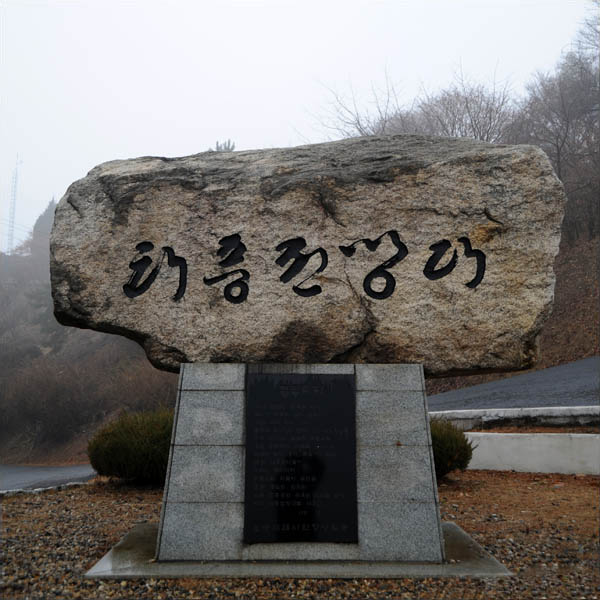
Typhoon Observatory

- Sangri Elementary School
- Yeoncheon Agricultural Cooperative Sangji Branch
- Yeoncheon Livestock Cooperative Sangji Branch
- Yeoncheon Health Center

=== Typhoon observatory ===
The public bus number 100 can be caught from this station to reach Heongsan-ri. A typhoon observatory is located in Heongsan-ri (35 minutes walk from the Heongsan-ri bus stop).

The typhoon observatory is under the jurisdiction of the Republic of Korea Armed Forces located in Hoengsan-ri, Jung-myeon, Yeoncheon-gun, Gyeonggi-do.

Located atop Suri Peak, the highest peak of Mt. Bikki, this observatory is the closest to the Military Demarcation Line. Opened by the Invincible Typhoon Unit on December 3, 1991, it has served as a national security education center, attracting over one million visitors. Standing 264 meters tall, the observatory is 800 meters from the Korean Demilitarized Zone and 1,600 meters from a North Korean military outpost, offering views of North Korean farms and, on clear days, even the vicinity of Kaesong. Outside the observatory, a security park is built, featuring monuments to the nations that participated in the Korean War, including the Australian, United Nations, and Thai military memorials, as well as a memorial to displaced Koreans. An exhibition hall at the observatory entrance displays North Korean daily necessities, daily goods, and spy infiltration equipment that have floated down the river since 1985.
