= Jeongok station =

Railway station in South Korea

| 전곡; Jeongok |
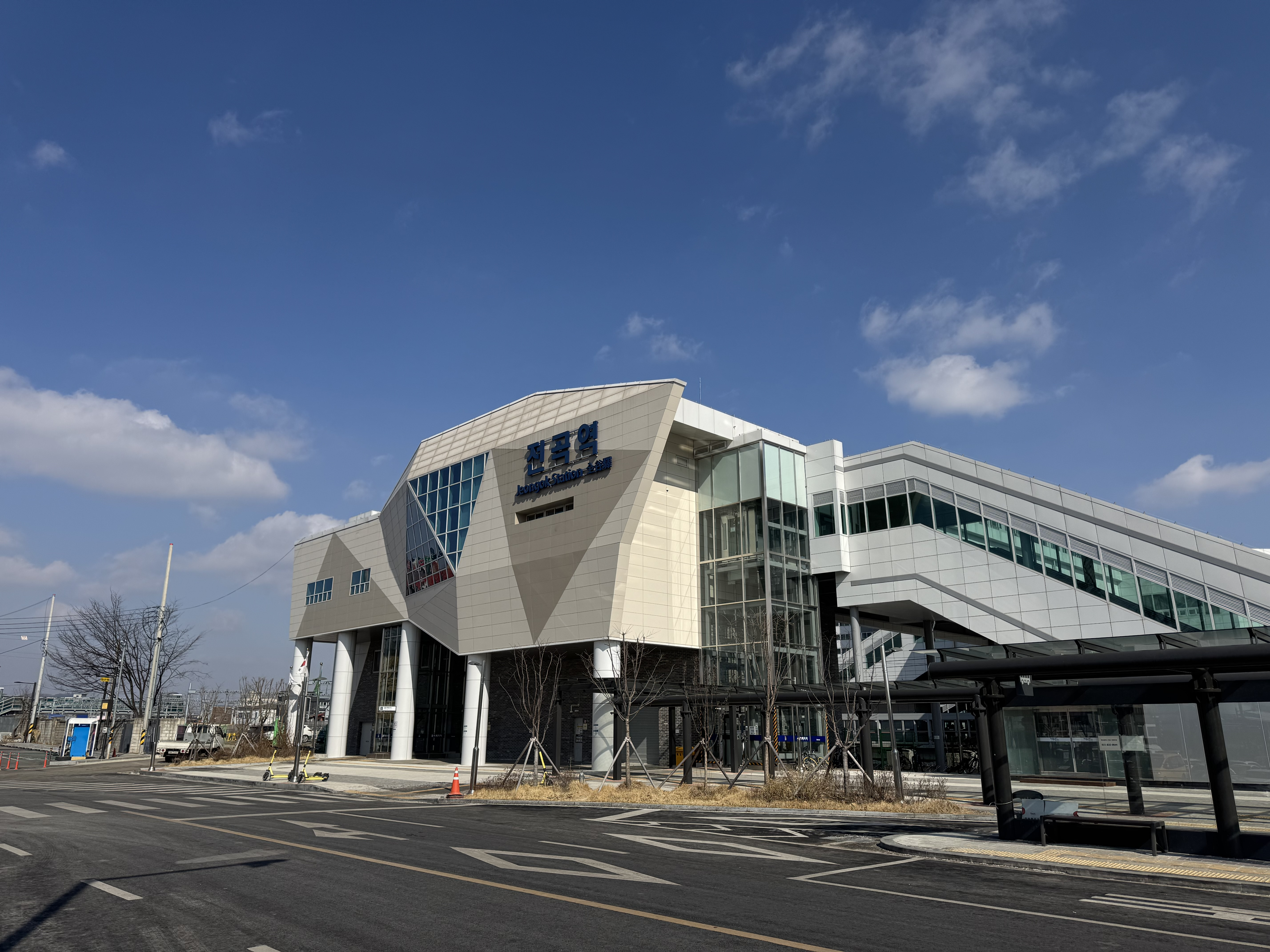

Korean name
- Hangul: 전곡역
- Hanja: 全谷驛
- Revised Romanization: Jeongonnyeok
- McCune–Reischauer: Chŏngonnyŏk

General information
- Location: 75 Jeongokyeok-ro, Jeongok-eup, Yeoncheon-gun, Gyeonggi-do; South Korea
- Coordinates: 38°1′28″N 127°4′15″E
- Operator: Korail
- Line: Gyeongwon Line

Construction
- Structure type: Over-track

History
- Opened: July 25, 1912

Key dates
- December 16, 2023: Line 1 opened

Services
| Preceding station | Seoul Metropolitan Subway | Following station |
|---|---|---|
| Yeoncheon Terminus | Line 1 | Cheongsan towards Incheon |
Location

Jeongok Station (Korean: 전곡역; Hanja: 全谷驛; RR: Jeongok-yeok) is a ground-level metro station on Line 1 of the Seoul Subway in Yeoncheon, South Korea.

== History ==
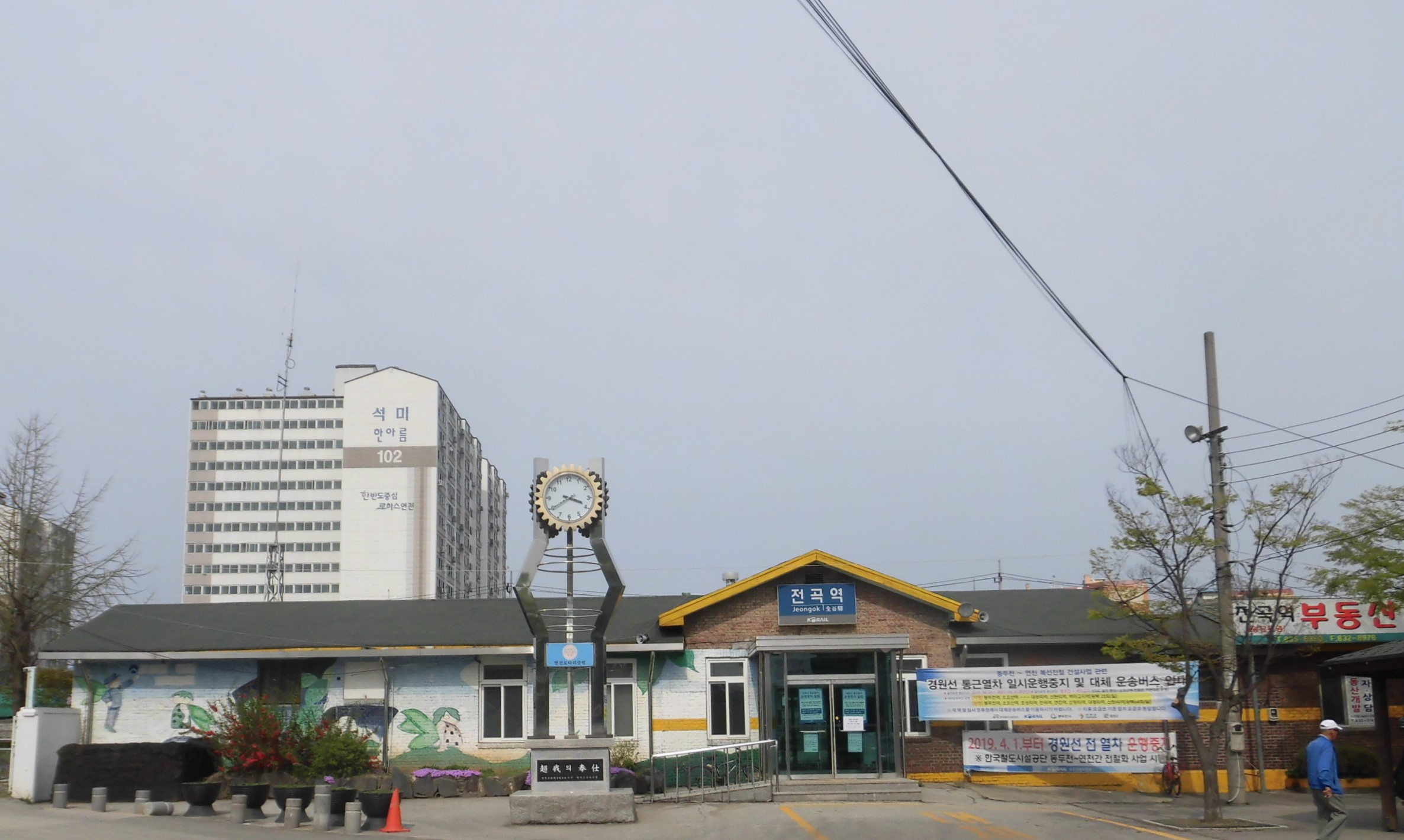
The old station building, completed in 1958, demolished in 2020

The station was opened on July 25, 1912. Operations had been temporarily suspended between July 28, 2011 and March 21, 2012 due to track damage caused by heavy rain. Gyeongwon Line commuter train service resumed on March 21, 2012, and the number of trains each way per day increased to 11, which then increased to 17 on July 1, 2012.

During the electrification of the Gyeongwon Lines's Dongducheon - Yeoncheon section for the extension of Seoul Subway Line 1, the old station building was demolished in 2020. On December 16, 2023, the new subway station opened with the opening of the Dongducheon - Yeoncheon section of Seoul Metropolitan Subway Line 1.

=== Timeline ===
- July 25, 1912: Opened for business
- September 1945: Due to the division of Korea along the 38th parallel north, it became the southernmost station on the Gyeongwon Line on the North Korean side.
- July 1953: After Korean War, it became one of the northernmost stations on the Gyeongwon Line on the Sorth Korean side.
- October 16, 1958: Completion of the current station
- July 28, 2011: Temporary suspension of operations due to track damage caused by heavy rain.
- March 21, 2012: Commuter train service resumed with the completion of the Choseong Bridge, and the number of one-way trains was reduced to six per day.
- July 1, 2012: Number of commuter trains serving the station increased
- October 31, 2014: Construction work began on the single-track section of Seoul Subway Line 1.
- May 29, 2015: Termination of cargo handling
- August 29, 2018: The Chatancheon Bridge between Jeongok and Yeoncheon was flooded due to heavy rain, and train service was limited to this station.
- September 7, 2018: Service resumed between Jeongok and Yeoncheon.
- April 1, 2019: Gyeongwon Line commuter train service suspended between Dongducheon and Yeoncheon due to electrification work. Replacement buses operated 32 times daily.
- December 16, 2023: Opening of the new subway station as part of the Seoul Subway Line 1 Yeoncheon extension.

== Station Layout ==
While the platforms of the station at ground level, the station building is on the footbridge over the tracks. One may use the footbridge to cross the tracks without entering the paid area.

| 3F | Concourse | Turnstiles, Customer Service, Washrooms, Exit |

1F; Platform
| 1F; Platform | Northbound | ← Seoul Subway Line 1 towards Yeoncheon (Yeoncheon) |
| 1F; Platform | Island platform, doors will open on the left / right |
| 1F; Platform | Southbound | Seoul Subway Line 1 towards Incheon (Cheongsan) → |

Platform screen doors are installed on the platform.

== Patronage ==
The 2023 data reflects the 16-day period from December 16 (the opening date) to December 31, 2023.

| Route | | Average daily number of people (people/day) | | Reference |
| Route | | 2022 | 2023 | Reference |
|---|---|---|---|---|
| Gyeongwon Line | Boarding | Not opened yet | 1,305 | |
| Gyeongwon Line | Getting off | Not opened yet | 1,208 | |

== Around the station ==
- Jeongok-ri site (Paleolithic site)
- Jeongok Post Office
- Jeongok Agricultural Cooperative (Central Branch)
- Paju Yeoncheon Livestock Cooperative (Jeongok Branch)
- Jeongok Police Station
- Jeongok-eup Administrative Welfare Center
- Nonghyup Bank Yeoncheon Branch

== Gallery ==
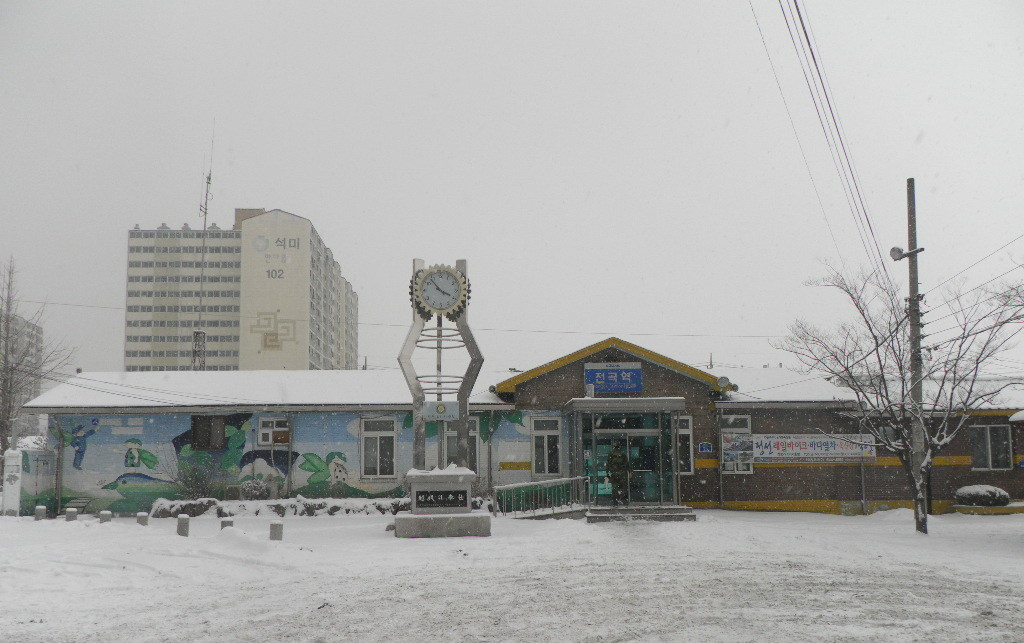
Old station (now demolished)

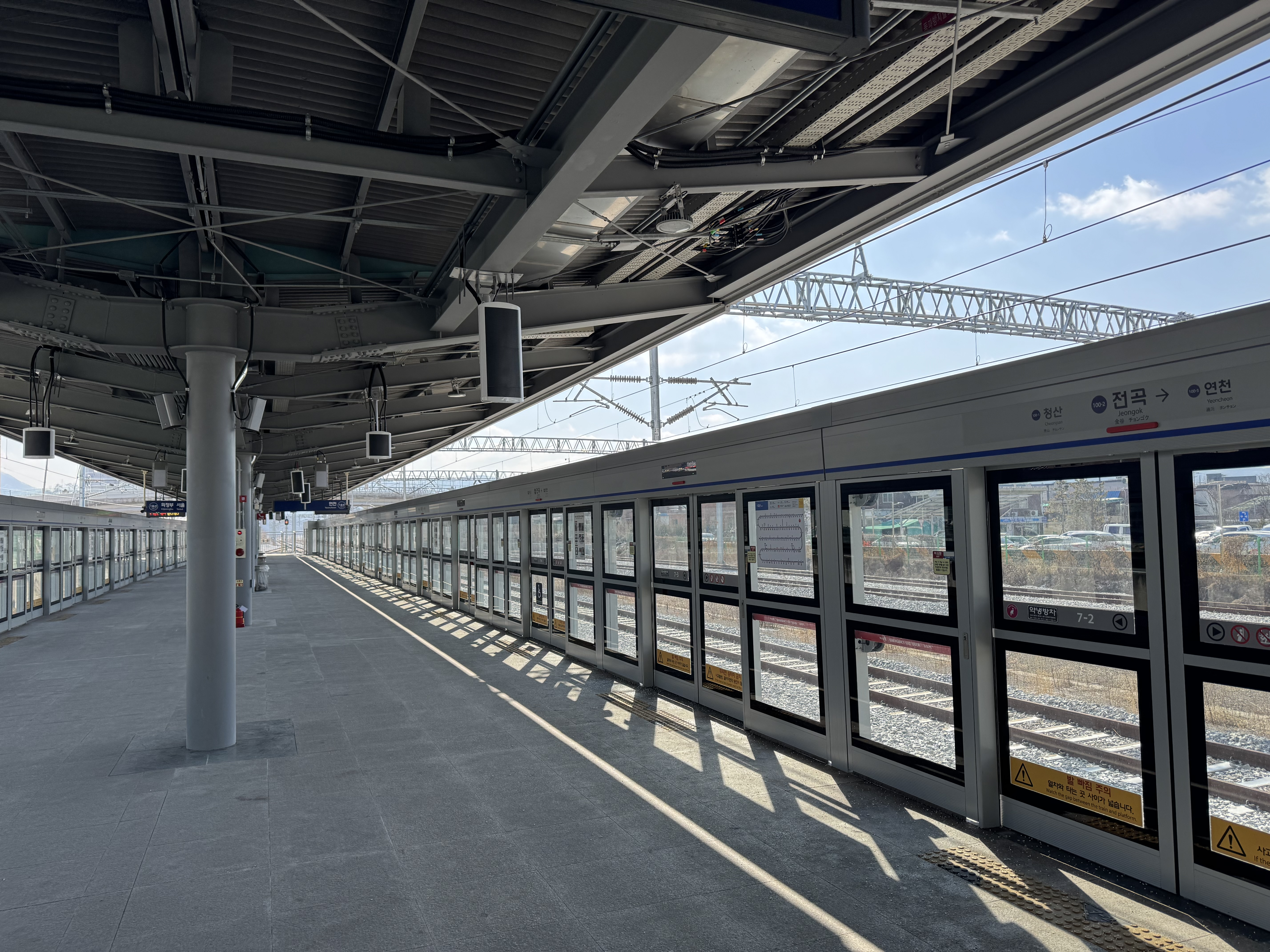
Platform

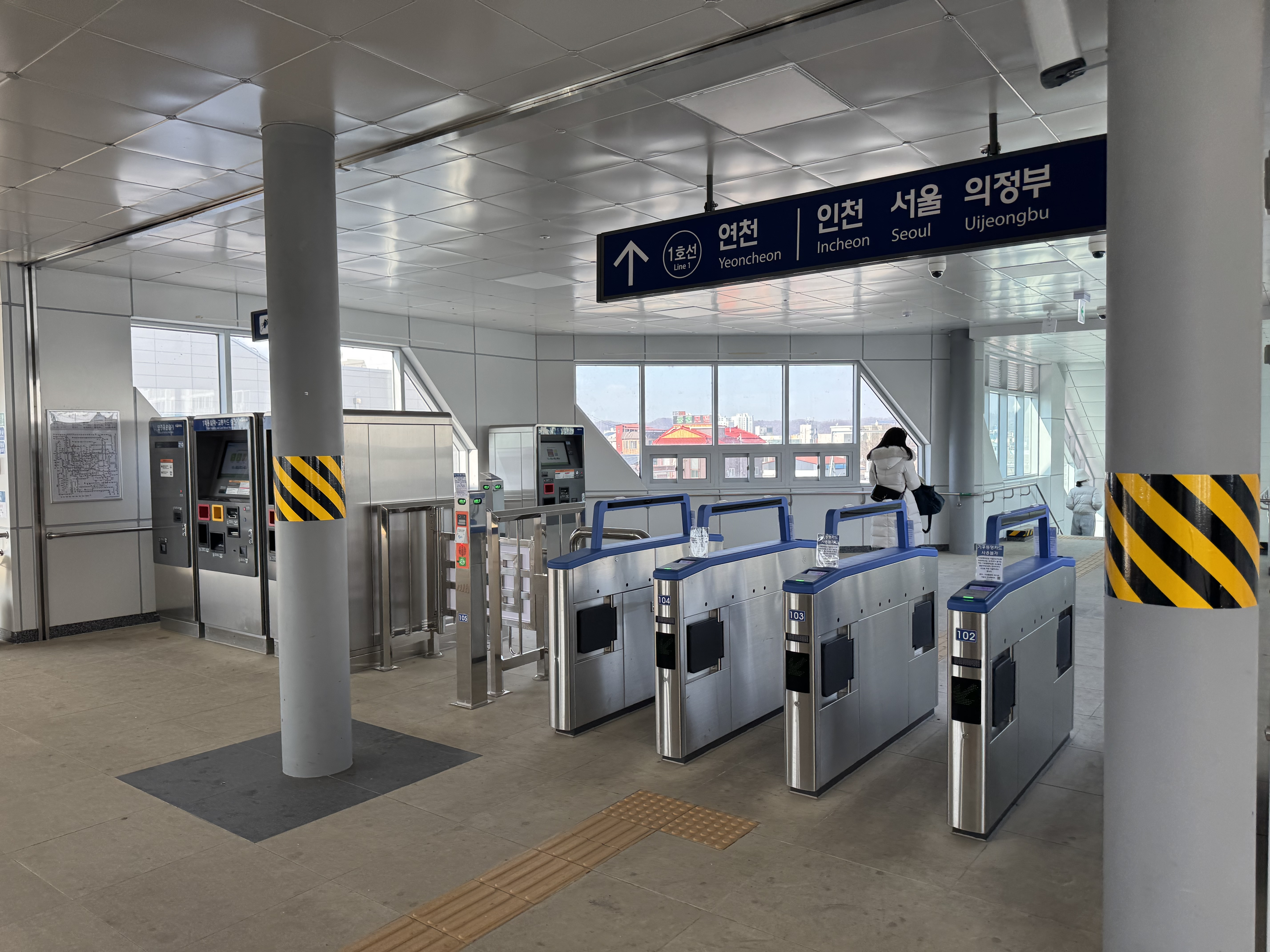
Turnstiles

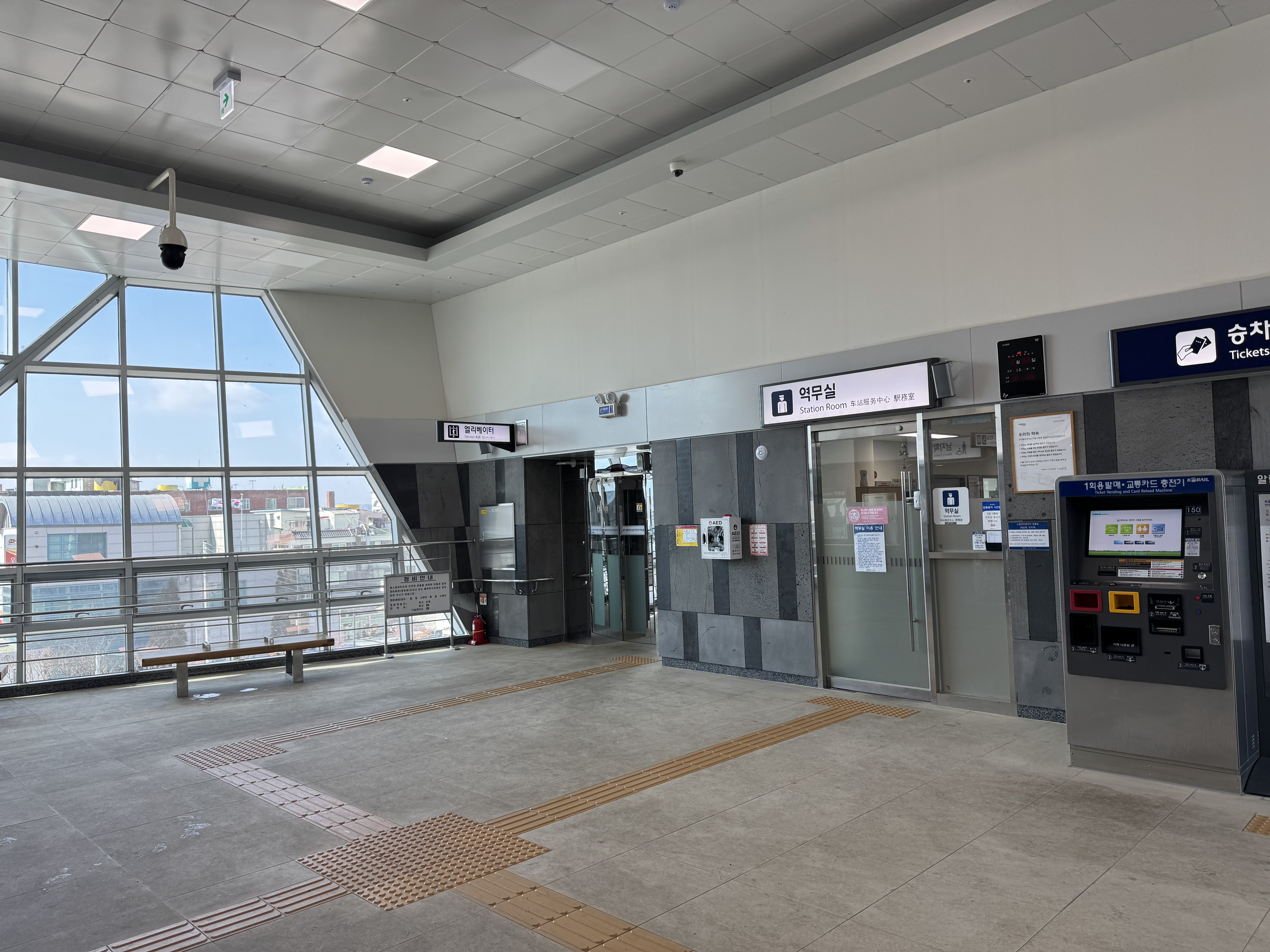
Waiting room

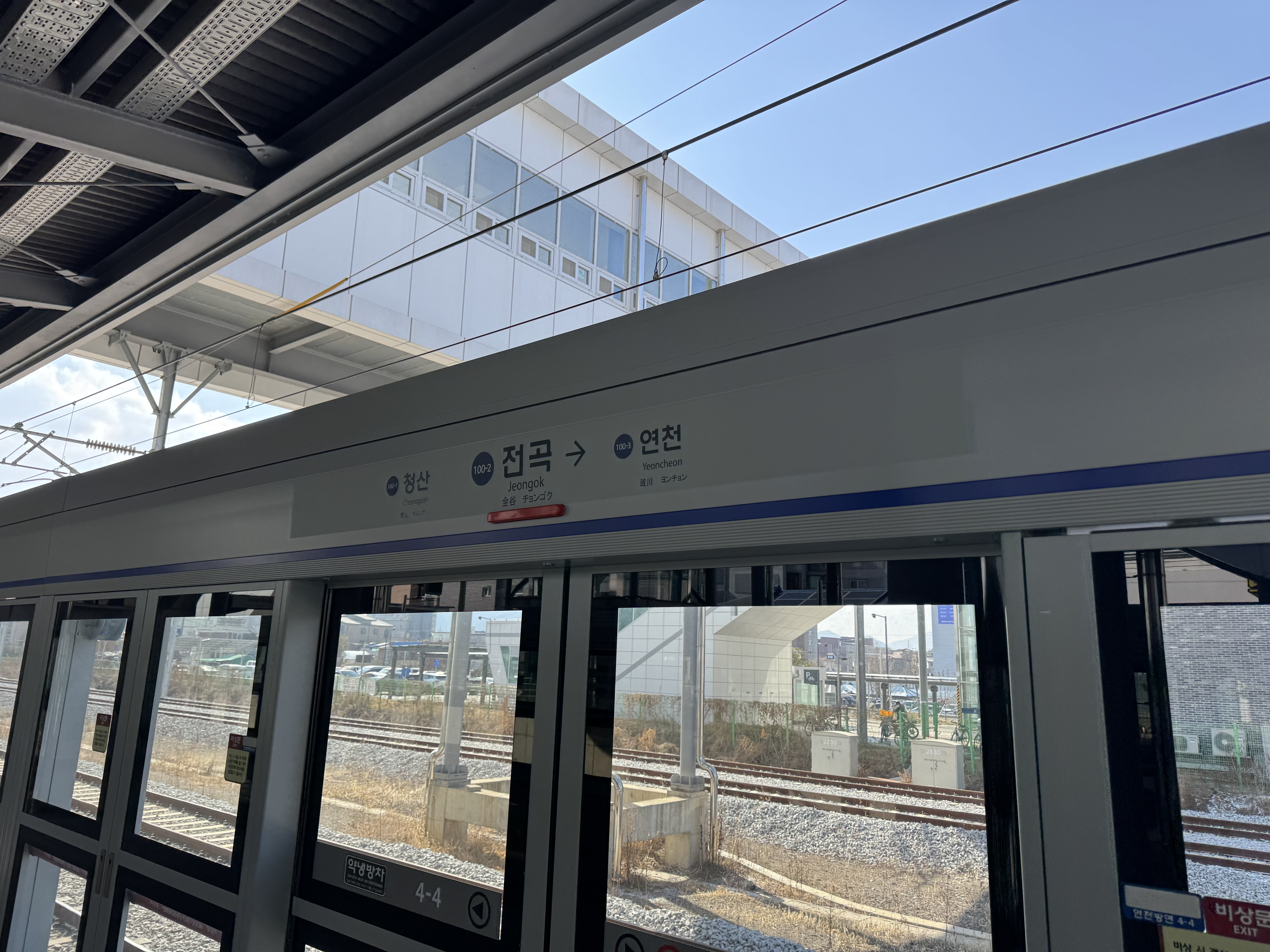
Station name on the platform screen door

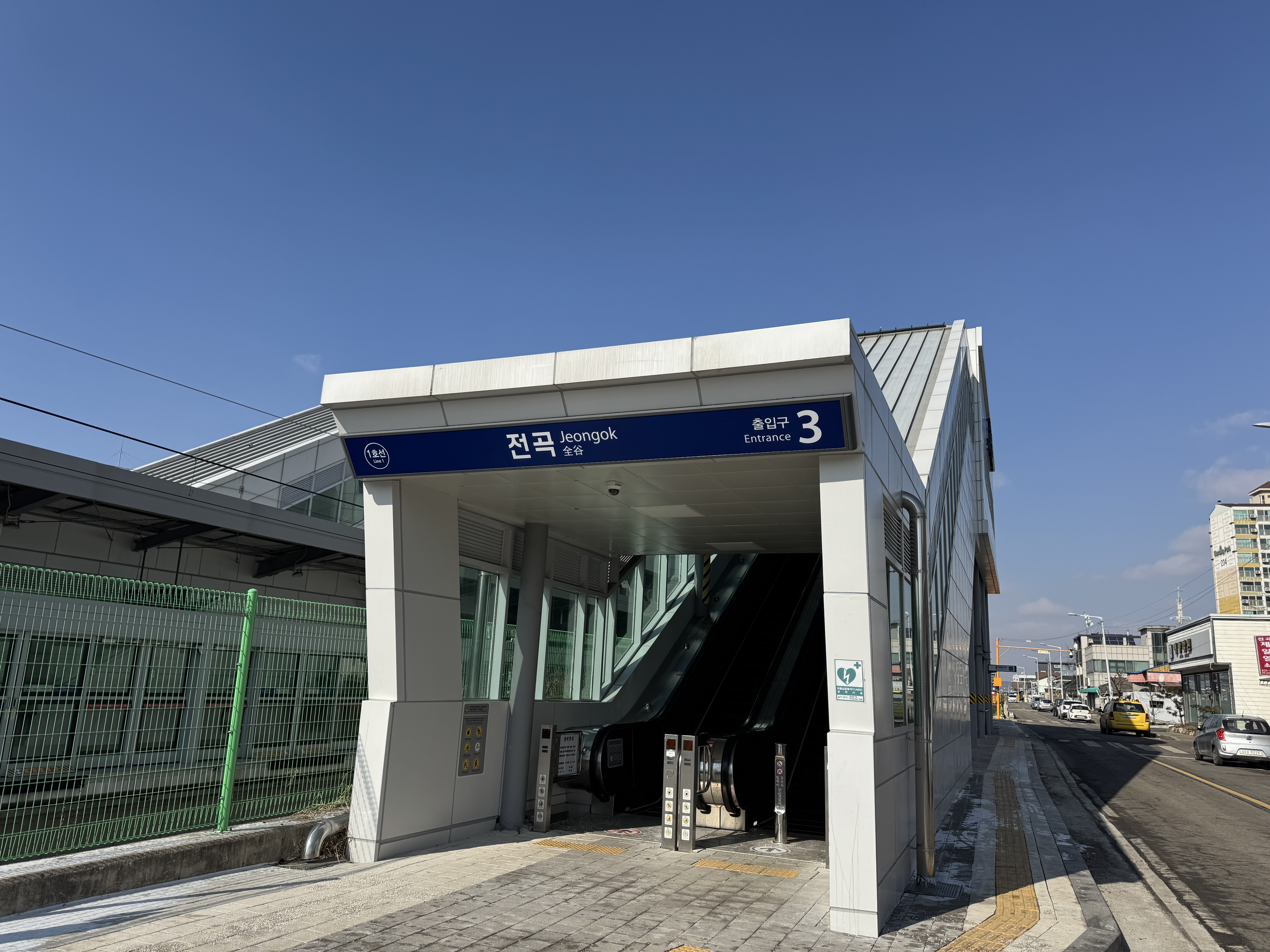
Exit 3
