= 青山駅 =

青山駅 or 靑山驛 may refer to:

- One of three stations named Aoyama Station in Japan:
  - Aoyama Station (Aichi)
  - Aoyama Station (Iwate)
  - Aoyama Station (Niigata)
- Cheongsan station in South Korea
