= Korail Commuter Diesel Car =

South Korean train type

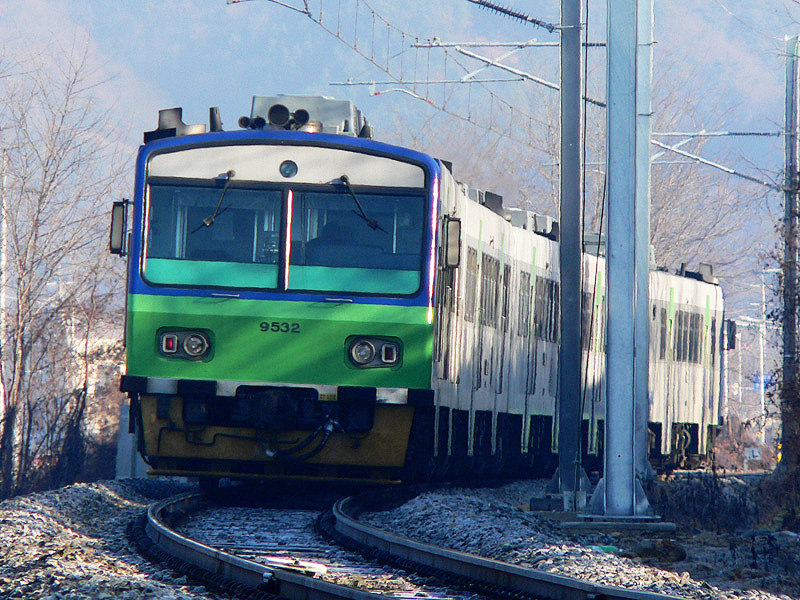
- In service: 1996–2023
- Manufacturer: Daewoo Heavy Industries
- Constructed: 1996–1999
- Entered service: 1999
- Number built: 131
- Number in service: 10
- Capacity: 79–89 seats
- Operator: (South Korea) Korail

Specifications
- Train length: 20,900 mm (68 ft 7 in)
- Width: 3,200 mm (10 ft 6 in)
- Height: 4,200 mm (13 ft 9 in)
- Wheel diameter: 860 mm (2 ft 10 in)
- Wheelbase: 2,100 mm (6 ft 11 in)
- Maximum speed: 120 km/h (75 mph)
- Prime mover: Cummins NT855-R4
- Engine type: Diesel
- Cylinder count: 6
- Power output: 310 hp (230 kW)
- Transmission: Voith T 211R
- HVAC: TRU–0454H
- Electric system: AC 440V
- Track gauge: 1,435 mm (4 ft 8 1/2 in)

The Korail Commuter Diesel Car (CDC; Korean: 도시통근형 디젤 액압 동차) were commuter diesel multiple units in South Korea. They were introduced in 1996. But due to the aging issue of the cars, they were fully retired on 17 December, 2023. Due the trains' age, the Sea Train ended its operation on 25 December 2023 after 16 years of service.

== Bibliography ==
- Byun, Seong Woo (August 1999). 한국철도차량 100년사: 철도차량기술검정단 한국철도차량 100년사 편찬위원회 편찬 [100 Years of Korean Railway Vehicles: Compilation of the 100 Year History of Korean Railroad Vehicles by the Railroad Vehicle Technology Inspection Group] (in Korean). Seoul: Railroad Vehicle Technology Inspection Team.
