= Godaesan =

Mountain in South Korea

Highest point
- Elevation: 832 m (2,730 ft)
- Coordinates: 38°12′N 127°10′E

Geography
- Location: South Korea

Korean name
- Hangul: 고대산
- Hanja: 高臺山
- RR: Godaesan
- MR: Kodaesan

Godaesan (Korean: 고대산) is a mountain in South Korea. Its area extends across Yeoncheon, Gyeonggi Province and Cheorwon County, Gangwon Province. Godaesan has an elevation of 832 m (2,730 ft).

== See also ==
- List of mountains in Korea
