= Baengmagoji station =

Railway station in South Korea

백마고지
Baengmagoji
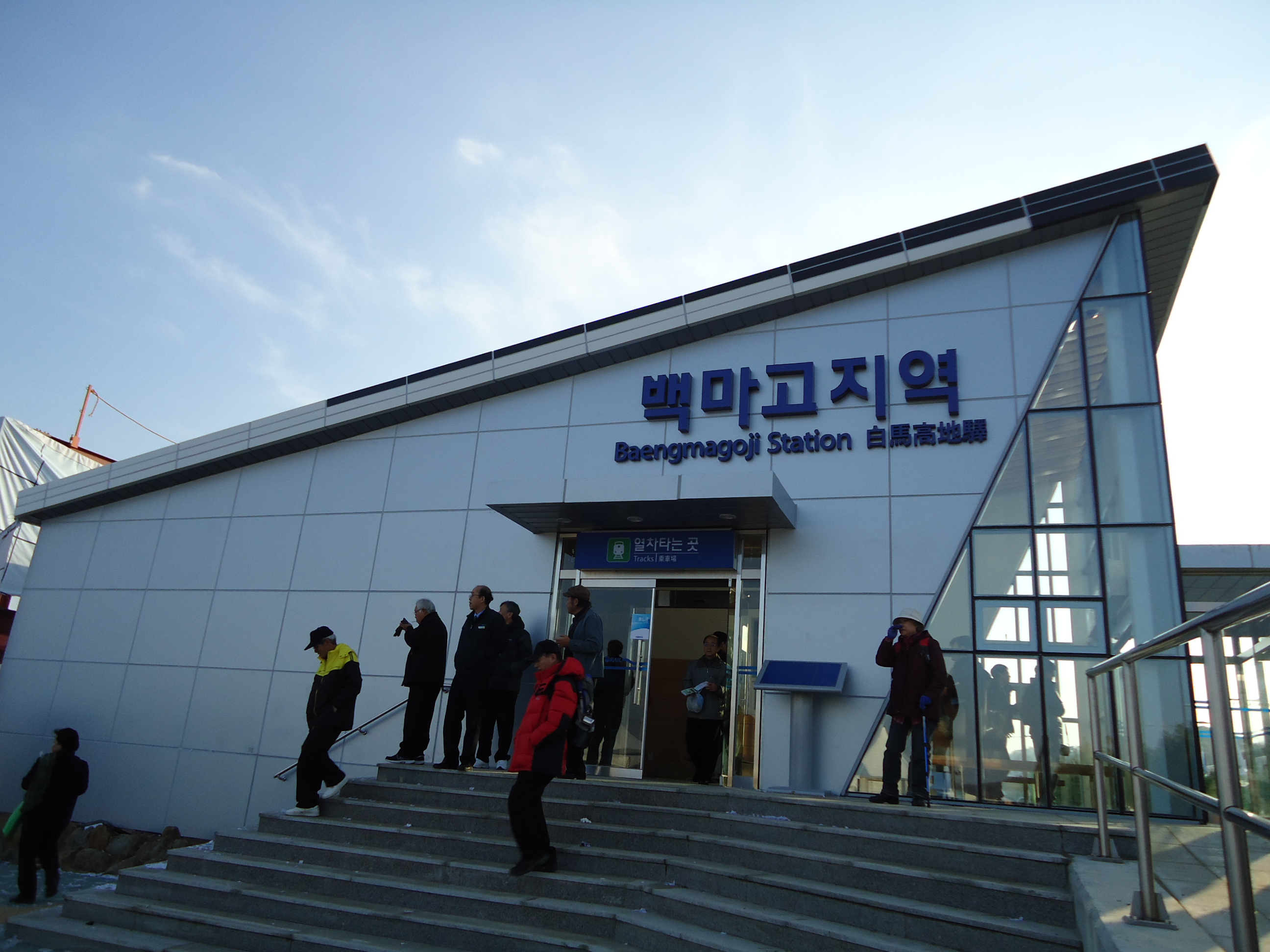

Korean name
- Hangul: 백마고지역
- Hanja: 白馬高地驛
- Revised Romanization: Baengmagoji-yeok
- McCune–Reischauer: Paengmagoji-yŏk

General information
- Location: 3591 Pyeonghwa-ro, Cheorwoon-eup, Cheorwon, Gangwon Province; South Korea
- Coordinates: 38.2574°N 127.1661°E
- Operator: Korail
- Line: Gyeongwon Line
- Platforms: 1
- Tracks: 1

Construction
- Structure type: Surface

History
- Opened: November 20, 2012
Location

Baengmagoji station is a railway station on the Gyeongwon Line in South Korea. The station opened on 20 November 2012. This station is named after Baengmagoji, the site where the Battle of White Horse took place in 1952, during the Korean War.

== History ==
Cheorwon Station is located within the Civilian Control Zone, so when the northern section of Gyeongwon Line was restored, that station was replaced by a newly built station in Daemari, Cheorwon-eup, outside the Civilian Control Zone. Some members of the Cheorwon Literary Society and residents of the nearby Odaemi Village wanted the station to be named Lee Tae-jun Station, as the birthplace of novelist Lee Tae-jun (Korean: 이태준; born Lee Gyu-tae; Hanja: 李奎泰; November 4, 1904 – 1978) was located nearby. However, the current station name was decided on after the Battle of White Horse that took place nearby. Initially, the original trackbed of the Gyeongwon Line was planned to be used as is, but due to opposition from the military unit in charge, it was changed to the current new route that goes over via a tunnel and an elevated section.

- 4 December 2007: the restoration work of the Gyeongwon Line between Sintan-ri station and this station was commenced.
- 20 November 2012: the station opened with 7-8 Tonggeun train services every day.
- 14 April 2014: the station began to be served by 11 Tonggeun trains every day.
- 1 August 2014: DMZ Train started to operate on the Gyeongwon Line with Baengmagoji station as the terminus.
- 5 August 2015: the groundbreaking ceremony for the restoration work of the Gyeongwon Line from Baengmagoji to Woljeong-ri was held at the station.
- June 2016: the restoration work towards Woljeong-ri was halted.
- 2 July 2018: track improvement work began on the Gyeongwon Line between Yeoncheon and Baengmagoji stations. Therefore, the Commuter Train and DMZ Train were cut back to Yeoncheon.
- 2 December 2018: Commuter and DMZ train services between Yeoncheon and Baengmagoji stations resumed.
- 1 April 2019: Commuter and DMZ train services were suspended due to the electrification work of Gyeongwon Line between Dongducheon station and Yeoncheon station.
- July 2026: Introduction of Mugunghwa-ho trains between Yeoncheon and Baengmagoji stations. (planned)

== Station layout ==
This single-story station features a single-track platform, with no sidings or turnaround facilities. A railway termination sculpture stands at the northern end of the platform, and the main line terminates slightly north of the platform. The station also features a Cheorwon County agricultural specialty store and a snack bar, operated by the Daemari Women's Association.

↑Sintan-ri
1 |
Terminus

Platform	Route	Destinations
1	Gyeongwon Line	Towards Yeoncheon, Dongducheon, Cheongnyangni

== Around the station ==
- Daemasa Intersection: This is where National Route 3 and National Route 87 intersect. There is a civilian control line checkpoint here. If you go past here and go about 2.5 km further, you will reach Cheorwon Station .
- Daemari Village Hall
- Daema Health Center
- Myojang Elementary School
- Battle of White Horse Memorial
- Korean Workers' Party Headquarters, Cheorwon

== Gallery ==
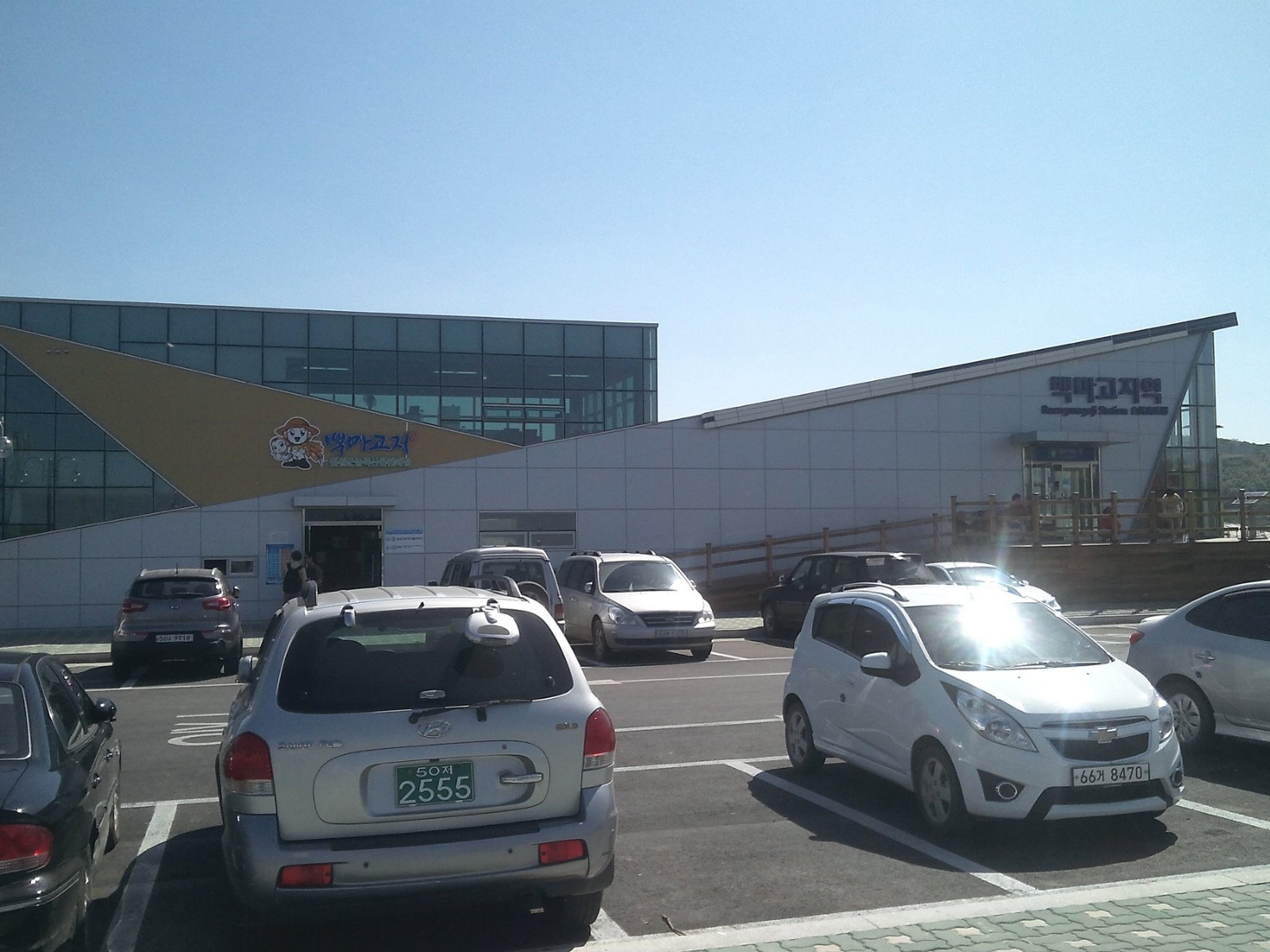
A panoramic view of Baekmagoji Station. The left side houses a Cheorwon County agricultural specialty product store on the first floor, and a restaurant on the second floor (as of the time of filming).

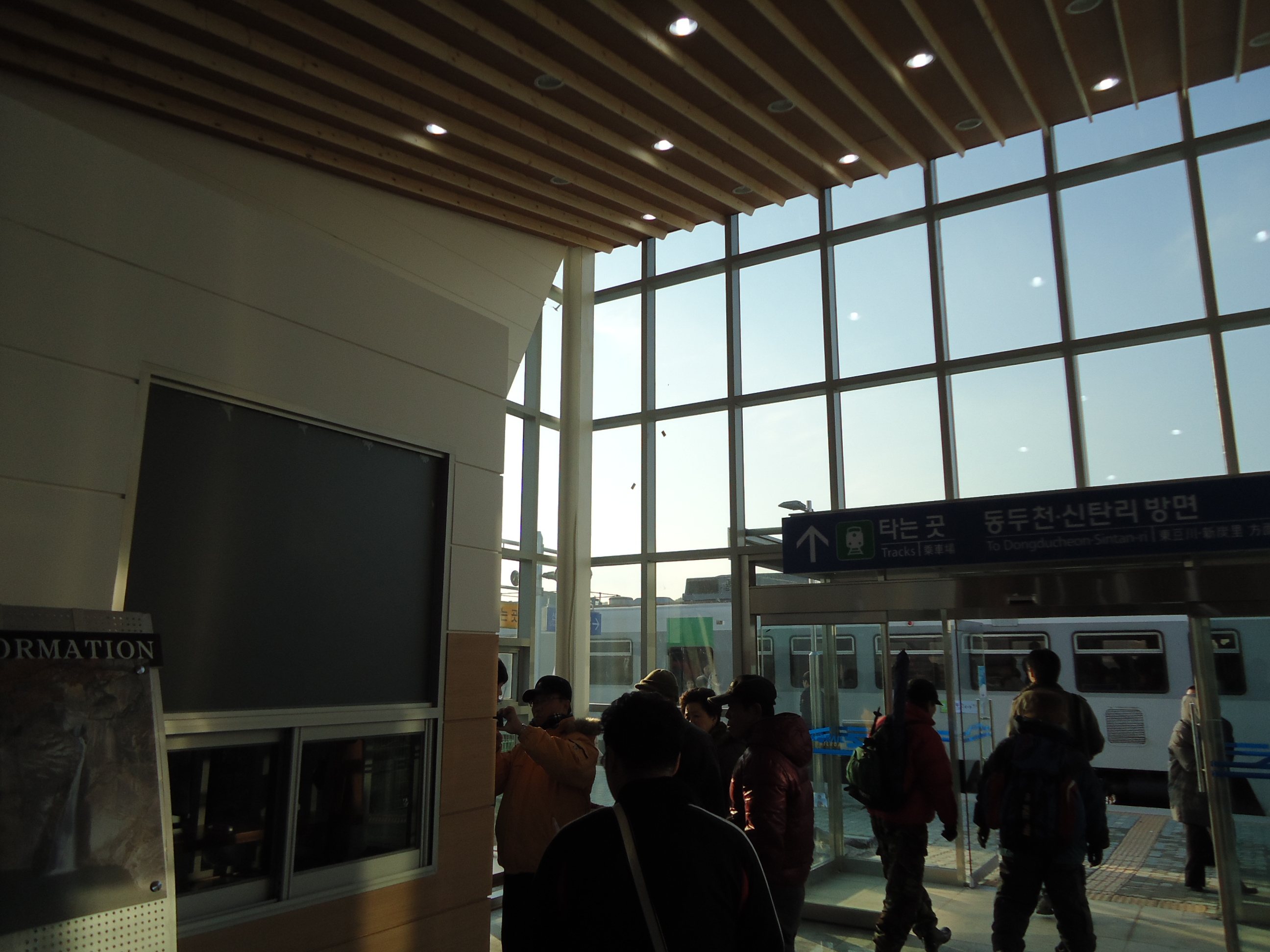
Baekmagoji Station was unmanned. There were restrooms and a waiting room

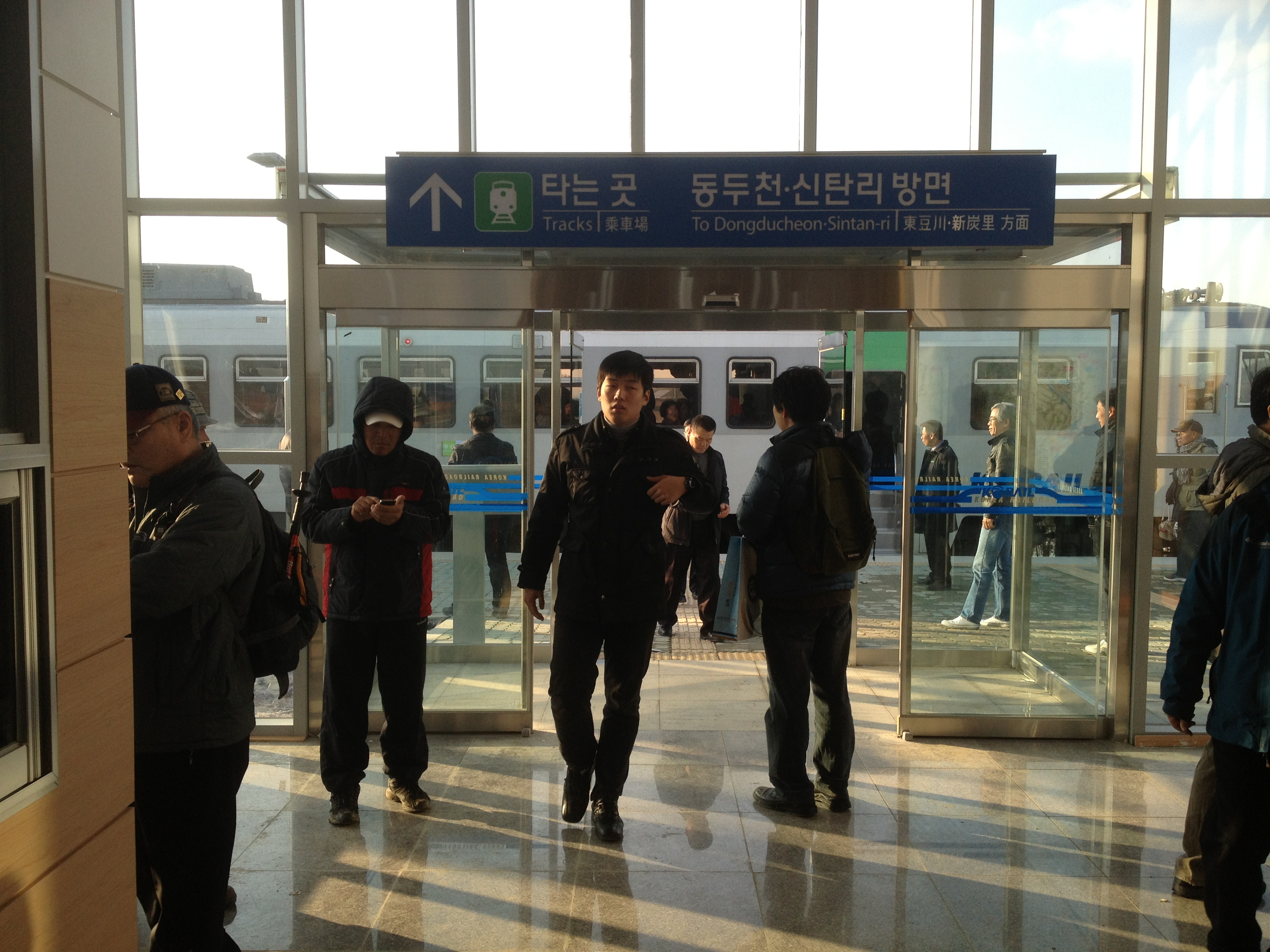
The waiting room of Baekmagoji Station

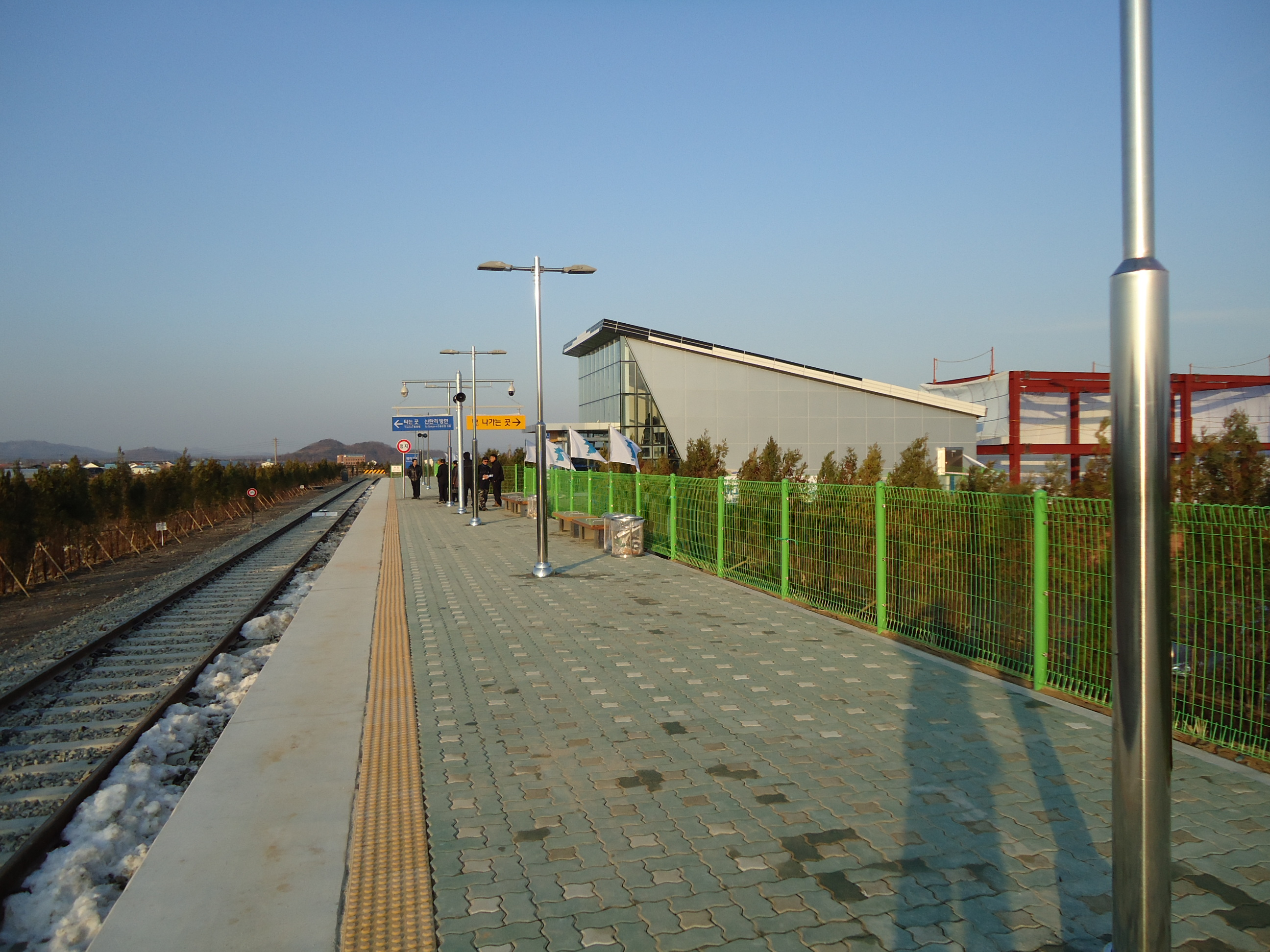
Platform

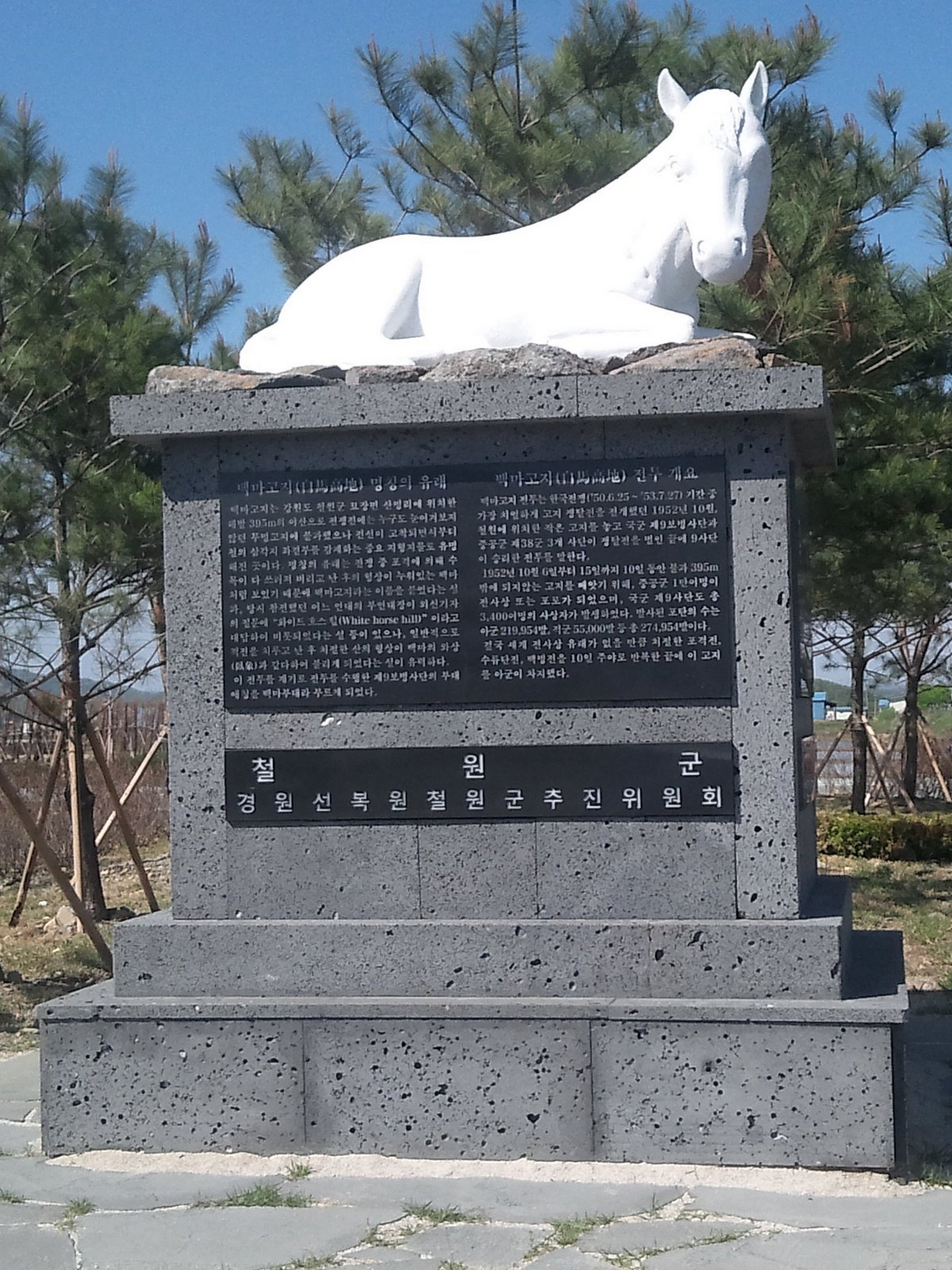
A monument commemorating the opening of the station erected in Baekmagoji Station Square. A description of the station is written on the right side.

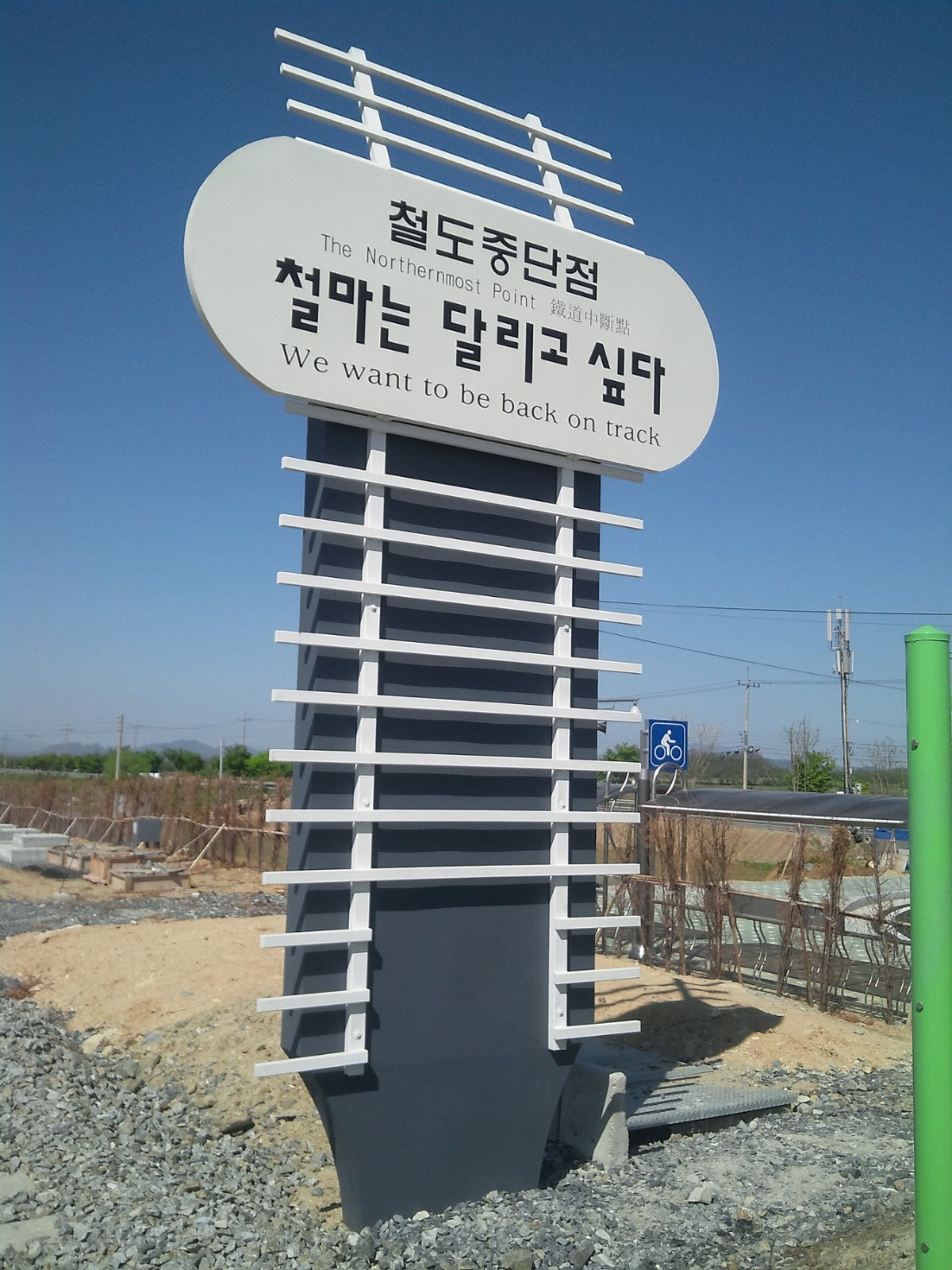
The northernmost point of Gyeongwon line at Baengmagoji

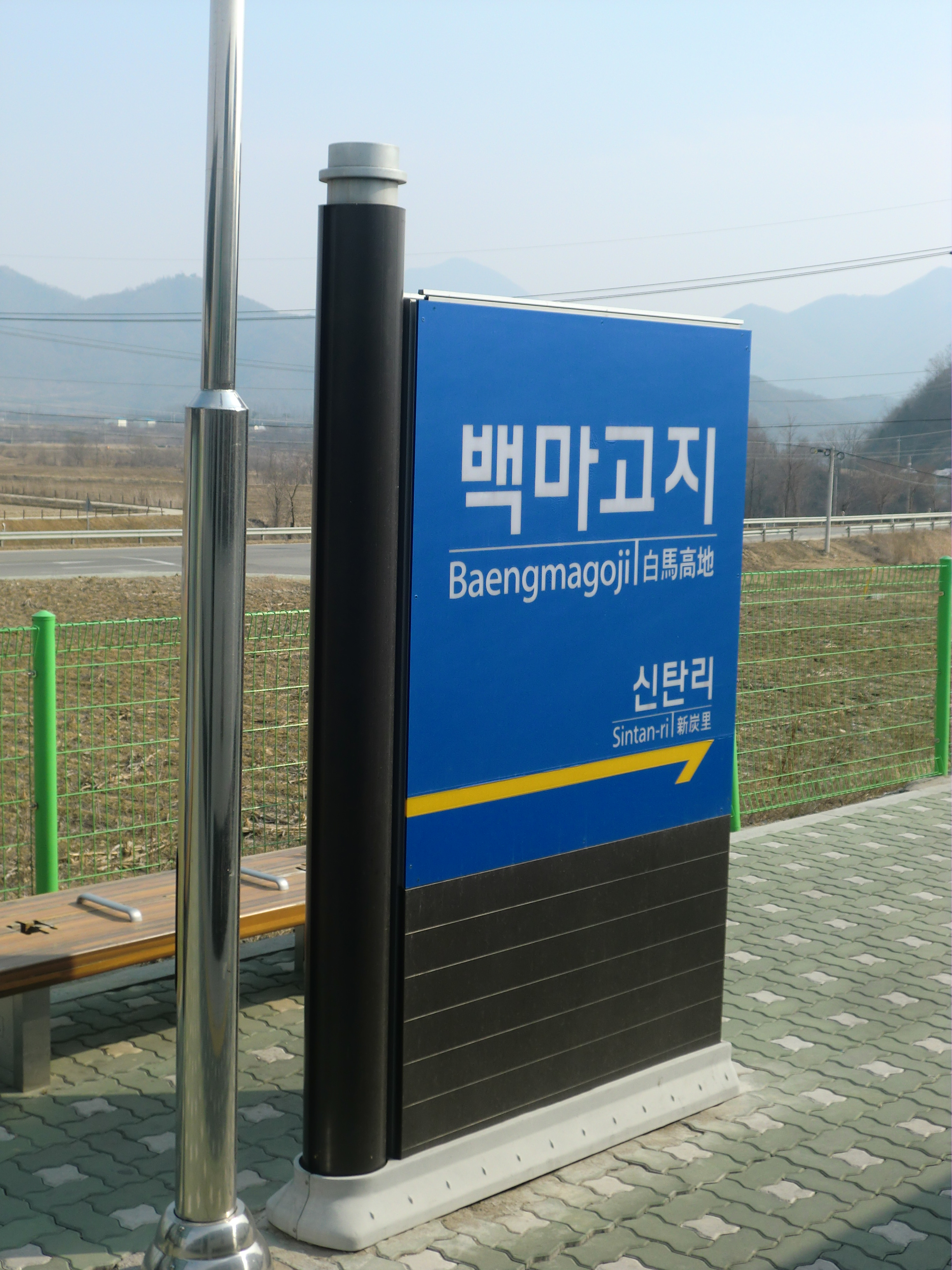
Baengmagoji station sign

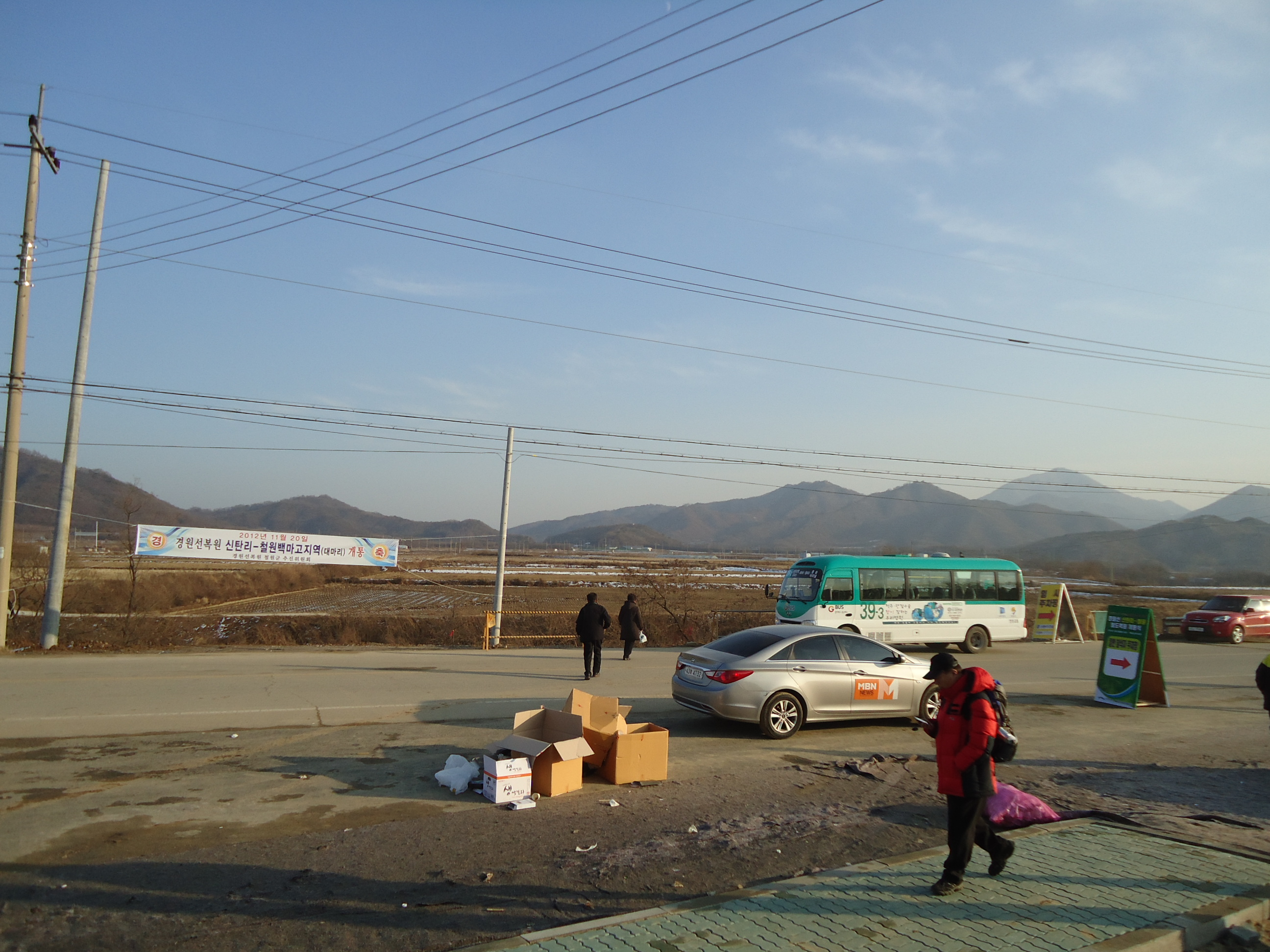
The front view of Baekmagoji Station
