= Yeoncheon station =

Station of the Seoul Metropolitan Subway

연천; Yeoncheon

Korean name
- Hangul: 연천역
- Hanja: 漣川驛
- Revised Romanization: Yeoncheonnyeok
- McCune–Reischauer: Yŏnchŏnnyŏk

General information
- Location: 273-7 Yeoncheon-ro, Yeoncheon-eup, Yeoncheon-gun, Gyeonggi-do; South Korea
- Coordinates: 38°6′19″N 127°4′44″E
- Operator: Korail
- Line: Gyeongwon Line
- Platforms: 2 island platforms
- Tracks: 4

Construction
- Structure type: At-grade

History
- Opened: July 25, 1912

Key dates
- December 16, 2023: Line 1 opened

Passengers

Services
Preceding station	Seoul Metropolitan Subway	Following station
Terminus	Line 1	Jeongok towards Incheon
Location

Yeoncheon Station (Korean: 연천역; Hanja: 漣川驛; RR: Yeoncheon-yeok) is an at-grade metro station on Line 1 of the Seoul Subway in Yeoncheon, Gyeonggi Province, South Korea. The station is the northern terminus of Line 1 and serves as a major transportation hub for the region. It is also notable for its historic water tower, which is a registered cultural property.

== History ==
The station opened on July 25, 1912.

The water tower on the station grounds, used by steam locomotives in the past, was designated as a registered cultural property due to its well-preserved condition and historical value. Bullet marks from the Korean War are still visible on the tower, serving as a historical resource.

Yeoncheon Station is located north of the 38th parallel north, and thus belonged to North Korea under Soviet military rule before the outbreak of the Korean War. A cargo platform, installed in 1948 to transport military supplies, remains on the west side of the station and is still used for military cargo transportation today. The old station building was completed on October 8, 1958.

On July 28, 2011, service to Yeoncheon station was suspended due to track loss cause by the 2011 floods in central Korea. Commuter train service resumed on March 21, 2012. On August 1, 2014, the DMZ Train began operation from the station.

Construction for the extension of Seoul Subway Line 1 to Yeoncheon station began on October 31, 2014. Train services were temporarily suspended for electrification work during construction, leading to the beginning of a replacement bus line service on April 1, 2019. On December 16, 2023, construction was completed and service on Seoul Subway Line 1 was extended to this station as a single-track extension from Soyosan station.

== Station layout ==
The station building is located on a footbridge above the at-grade tracks. The footbridge can be used to cross the tracks without entering the paid area of the station.

Platform screen doors are installed on the island platform for Seoul Subway Line 1.

== Water tower ==
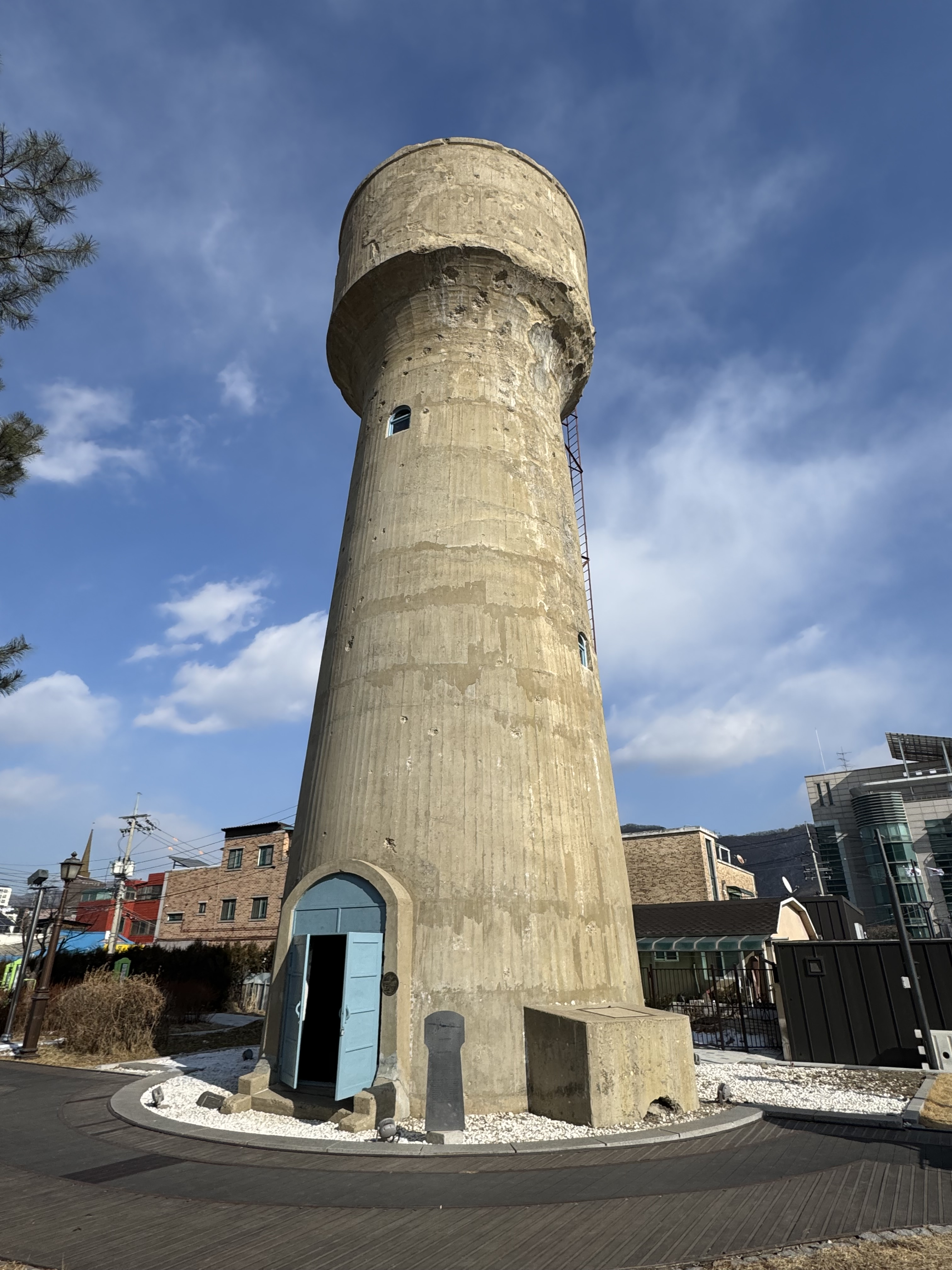
Yeoncheon Station Water Tower

The Yeoncheon station water tower (Korean: 연천역 급수탑; Hanja: 漣川驛 給水塔) is a water tower built in 1914 at Yeoncheon Station in Yeoncheon-gun, Gyeonggi-do, South Korea. It was designated as National Registered Cultural Property No. 45 on January 28, 2003.

=== Background ===
The Gyeongwon Line, built during the Japanese colonial period, was extended to Yeoncheon Station on July 25, 1912. Steam locomotives required water towers to replenish their water supply at regular intervals. The first water towers in Korea were built along the Gyeongin Line in 1899. By 2003, only seven of these historic water towers remained in Korea, all of which were designated as registered cultural heritage sites.

=== Structure ===
The Yeoncheon station water tower was built to supply water to steam locomotives on the Gyeongwon Line. Two towers, one box-shaped and one cylindrical, remain. The box-shaped tower is made of concrete with a three-tiered façade. It has an arched entrance and an exterior with painted joints, giving it the appearance of brickwork. The cylindrical tower has three well-preserved water pipes and mechanical equipment. Bullet marks from the Korean War are visible on its exterior. Although it became obsolete in the 1950s with the introduction of diesel locomotives, it remains a valuable piece of railway history.

== Patronage ==
The 2023 data reflects the 16-day period from December 16 (the opening date) to December 31, 2023.

Route	Average daily number of people (people/day)	
Route	2023	2024
Gyeongwon Line	3,942	2,593

== Around the station ==
- Yeoncheon County Office
- Yeoncheon Public Bus Terminal
- Yeoncheon Elementary School
- Yeoncheon Police Station
- Yeoncheon Agricultural Cooperative
- Yeoncheon Post Office
- Yeoncheon-eup Administrative Welfare Center
- Yeoncheon Middle School
- Yeoncheon High School
- Yeoncheon County Senior Welfare Center
- Yeoncheon-gun Sureul Art Hall
- Yeoncheon Sports Complex (home stadium of Yeoncheon FC, K4 League)

== Gallery ==
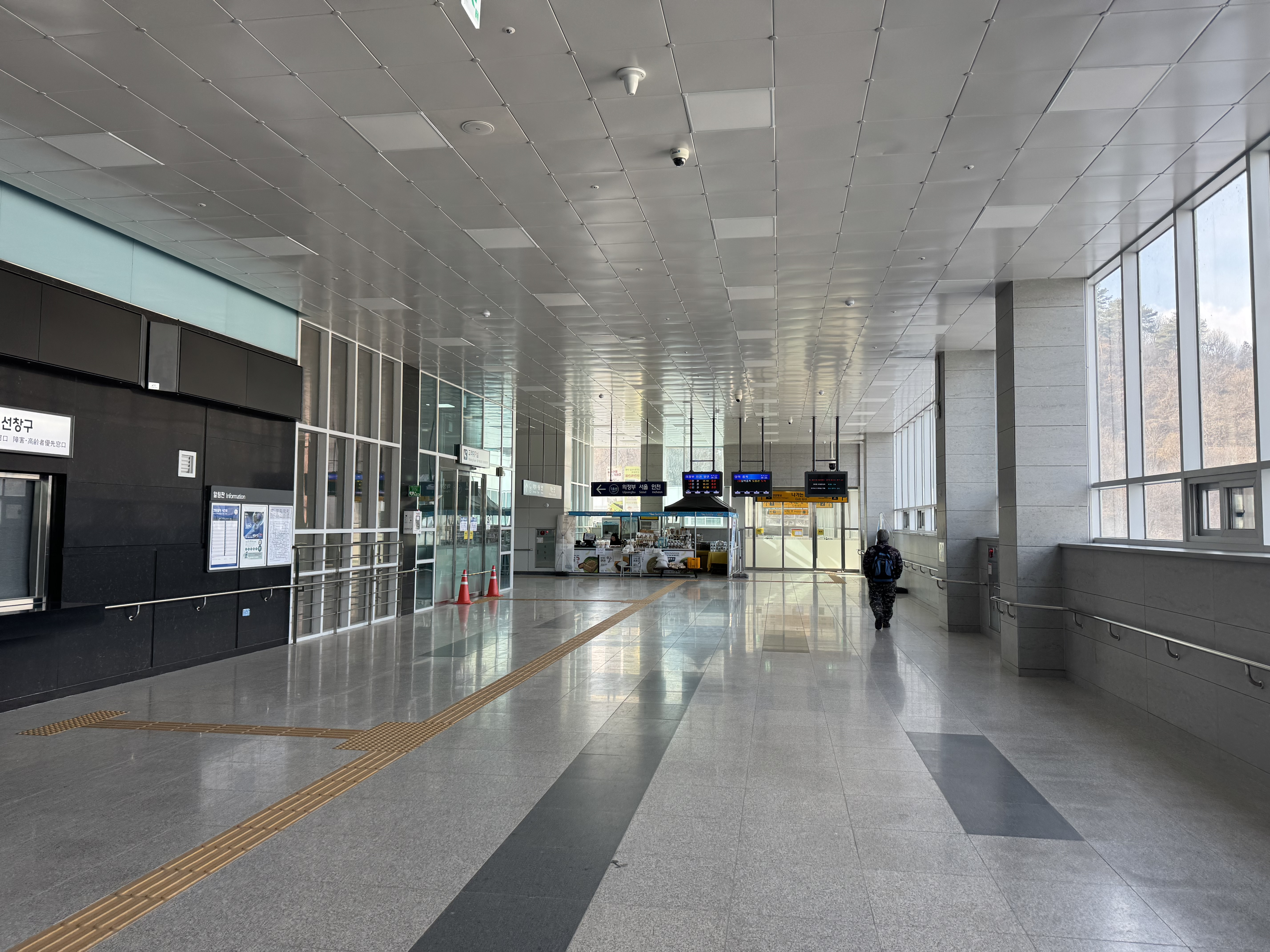
Waiting Room

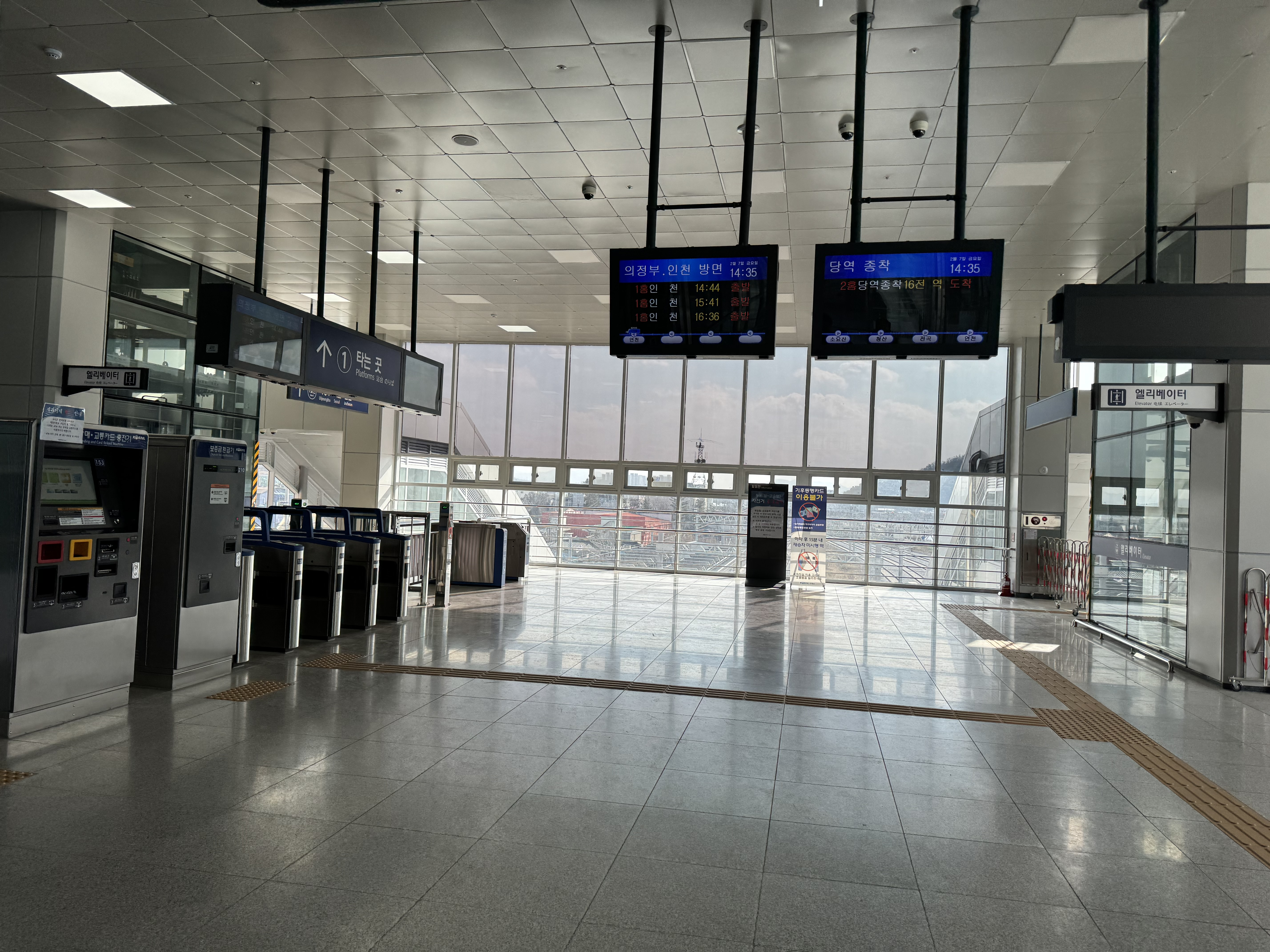
Faregates

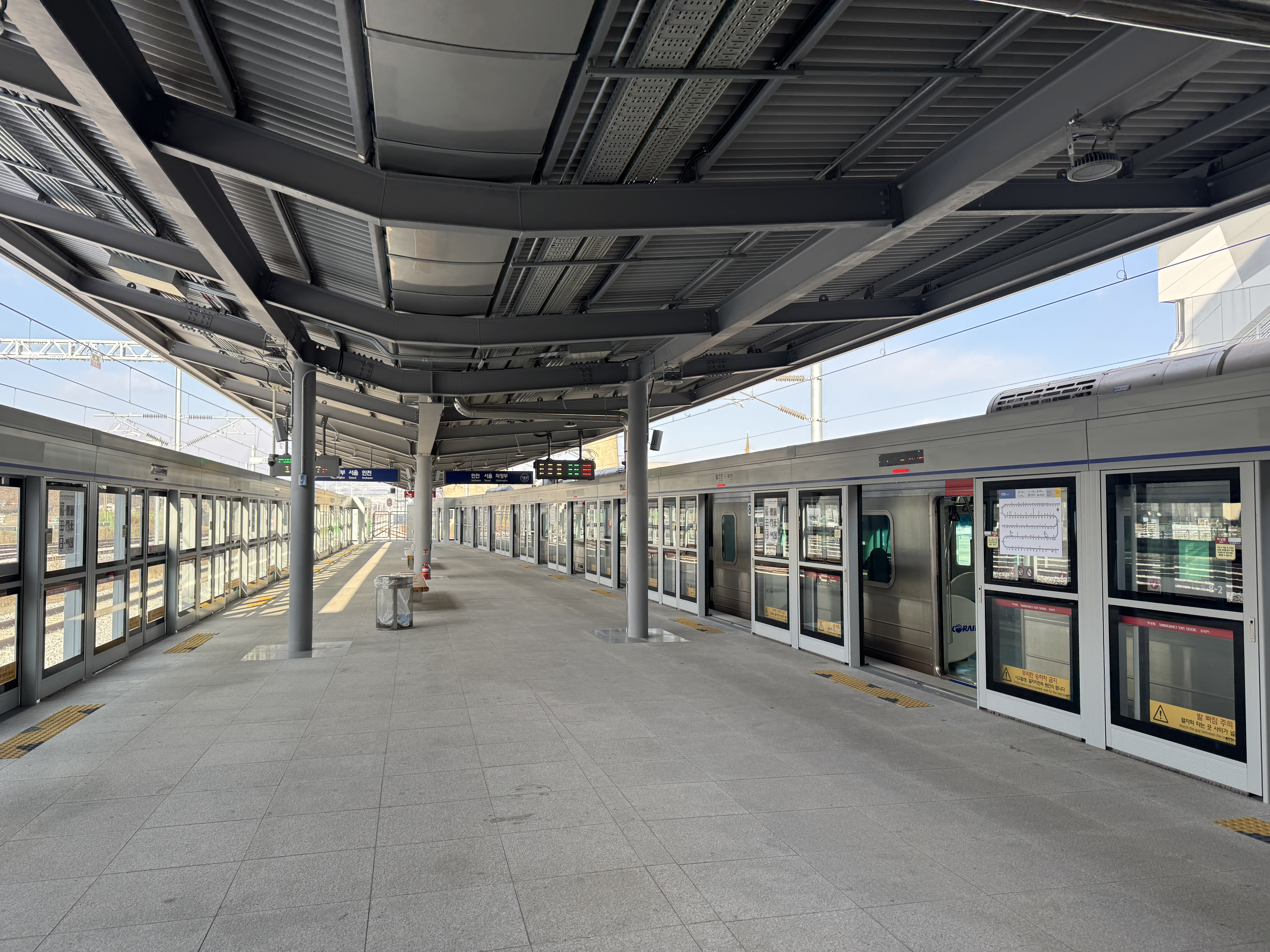
Platform

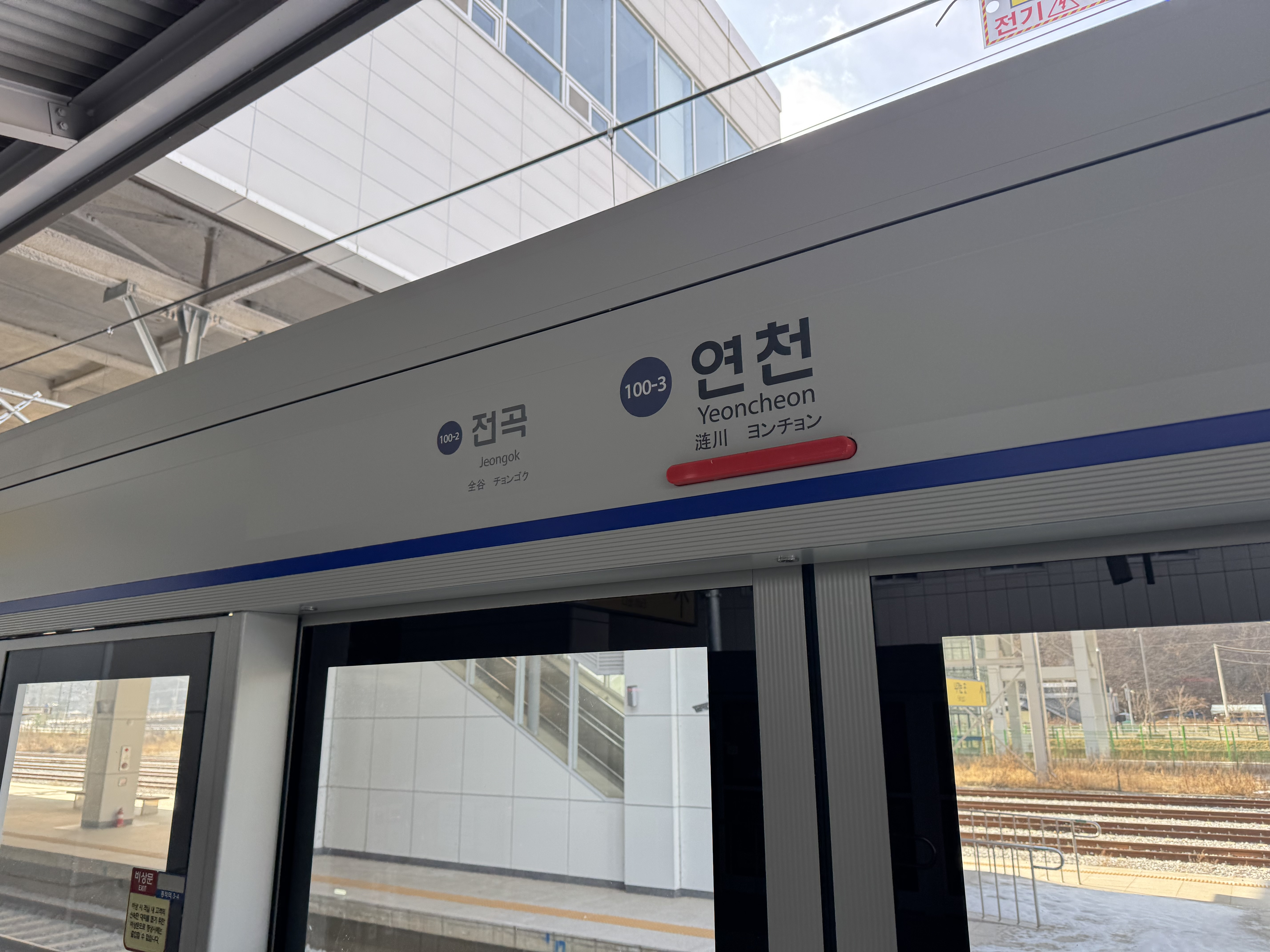
Platform screen door

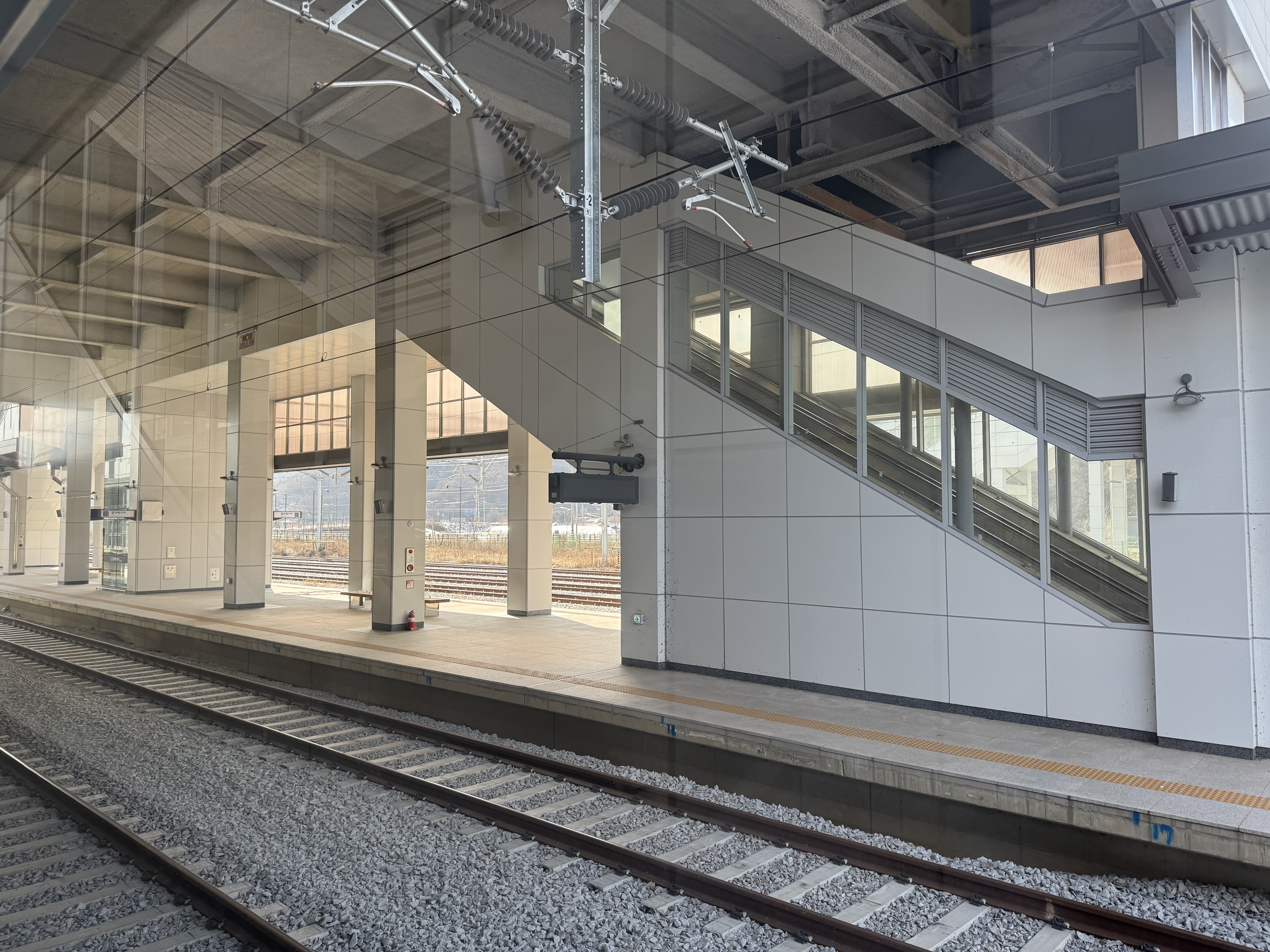
Platform for future Mugunghwa-ho trains to Baengmagoji

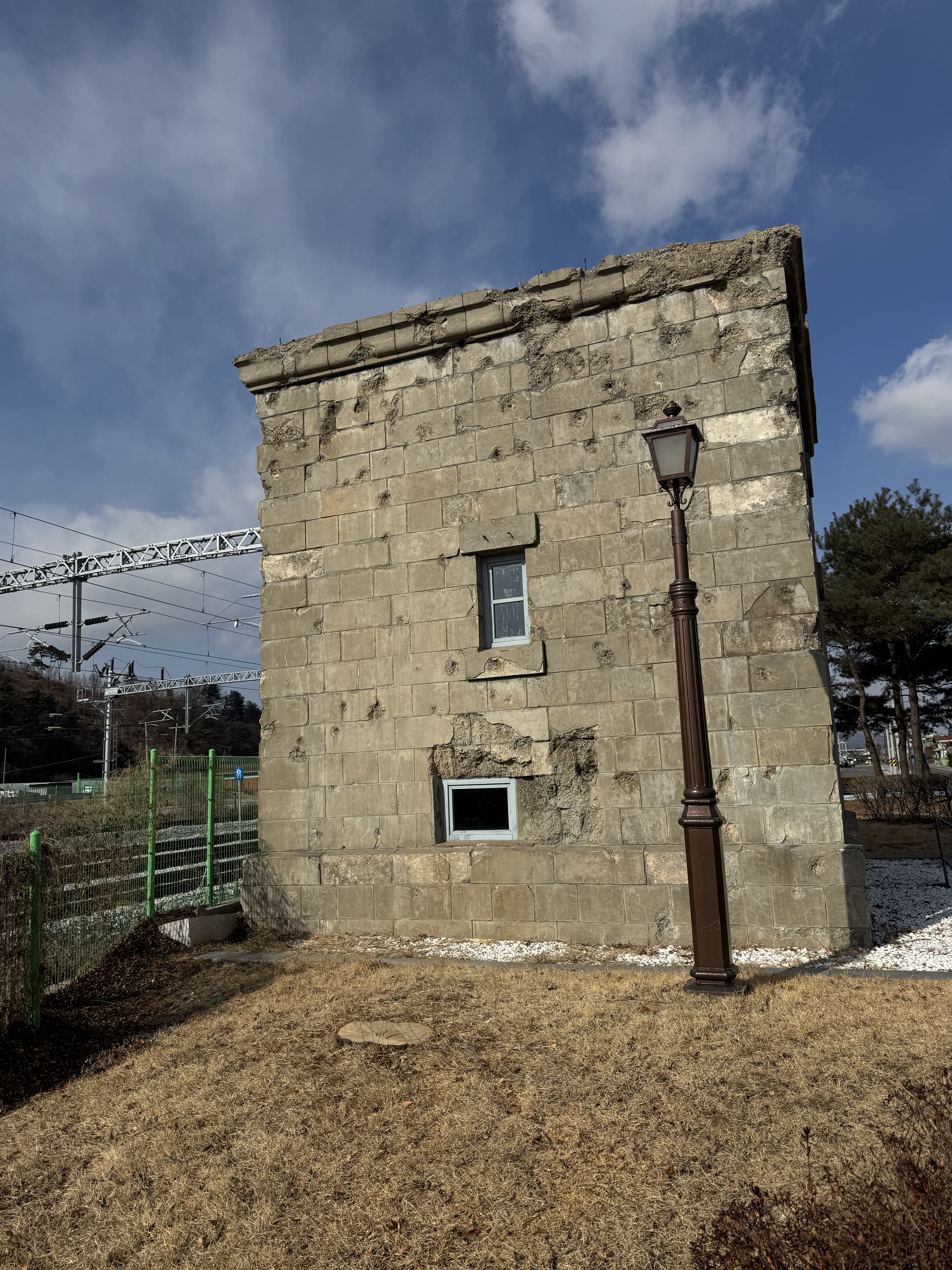
Yeoncheon station water tower

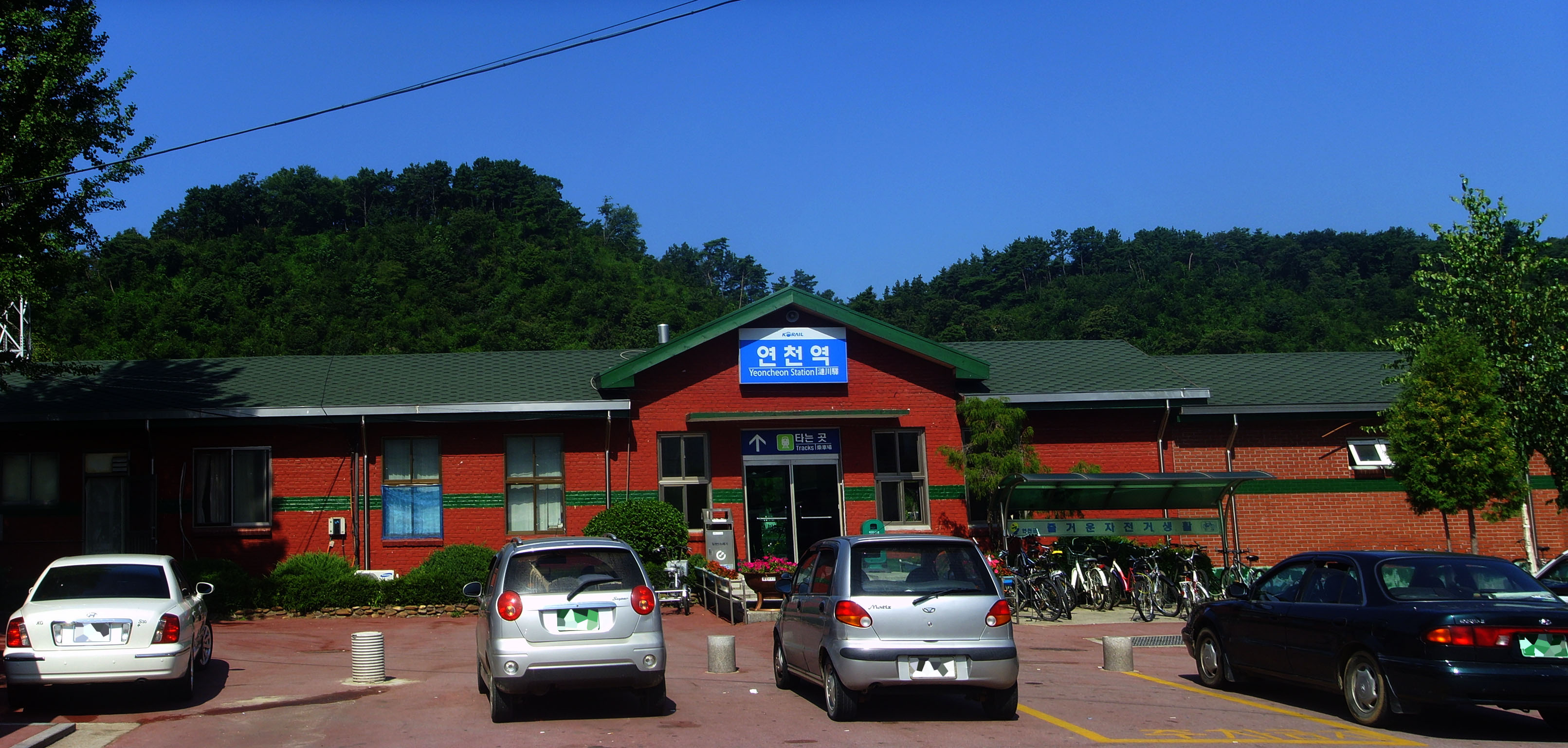
The former station building
