= Commuter Train (South Korea) =

Class of passenger train service in South Korea

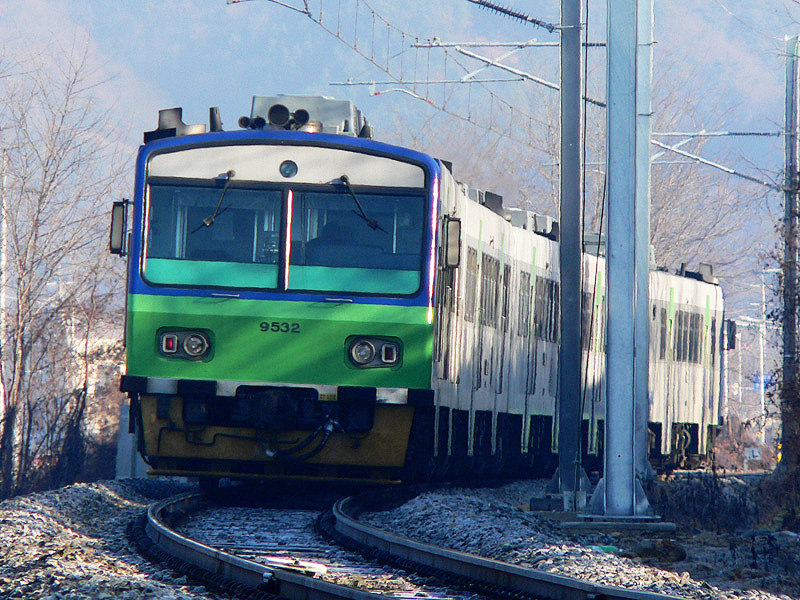
- A Commuter Train approaching Baengmagoji Station.

Overview
- Service type: Commuter rail
- Status: Discontinued
- Locale: Gwangju
- Predecessor: Tongil-ho
- First service: April 1, 1996
- Last service: December 17, 2023
- Successor: Mugunghwa-ho; Seoul Subway Line 1 and shuttle bus services (Gyeongwon Line service)
- Current operator: Korail

Route
- Termini: Gwangju; GwangjuSongjeong
- Stops: 3
- Line used: Gwangju Line

Technical
- Rolling stock: Commuter Diesel Car (CDC)
- Track gauge: 1,435 mm (4 ft 8 1/2 in) standard gauge

- Commuter Train
- Hangul: 통근열차
- Hanja: 通勤列車
- Revised Romanization: Tonggeun yeolcha
- McCune–Reischauer: T'onggŭn yŏlch'a

The Commuter Train (Korean: 통근열차; RR: tonggeun yeolcha; previously called Tongil-ho, 통일호) was a class of short-run commuter trains operated by Korail, the national railroad of South Korea. They operated once or twice daily in each direction, along a few tens of kilometers of track. They provided an important function for many smaller rural communities (including suburbs around Seoul), which often lack good transit connections. Commuter Train operations on the Gyeongwon line were temporarily suspended its operation on April 1, 2019, due to the construction and partial electrification of the line for the Soyosan-Yeoncheon extension of Seoul Subway Line 1. They were permanently suspended on December 16, 2023, after the opening of the Yeoncheon extension, and due to the old age of Korail Commuter Diesel Car (CDC) trains. This effectively ended regular train service north of Yeoncheon Station, with the provincial government of Cheolwon lodging a complaint. Commuter trains last operated on the Gwangju Line in Gwangju between GwangjuSongjeong and Gwangju station, from January 1, 2020, until December 17, 2023, permanently being phased out due to the old age of CDC trains.

== Trains ==
- Original Tongil-ho Passenger Car
- Tang eng Tongil-ho Passenger Car
- Express Electric Car/Korail 9900 series
- Commuter Diesel Car (CDC)

=== Operation ===
==== Former ====
- Gwangju Line: Gwangju – GwangjuSongjeong: Replaced with either Mugunghwa-ho, Saemaeul-ho, or Gwangju Metro Line 1
- Gyeongbu Line: Replaced with Mugunghwa-ho
- Honam Line: Replaced with Mugunghwa-ho
- Gyeongjeon Line: Replaced with Mugunghwa-ho
- Jinhae Line: Replaced with Saemaeul-ho
- Daegu Line: Replaced with Mugunghwa-ho
- Jungang line: Replaced with Mugunghwa-ho
- Donghae Nambu Line: Replaced with Mugunghwa-ho & the Donghae Line, part of the Busan Metro
- Jeolla Line: Replaced with Mugunghwa-ho
- Gyeongwon Line: Replaced with the Seoul Subway Line 1 from Uijeongbu to Yeoncheon, remaining parts operated by shuttle bus services
- Gyeongui Line: Replaced by the Gyeongui-Jungang Line and the DMZ Train
- Gunsan Hwamul Line: Replaced with Saemaeul-ho & Mugunghwa-ho. (Gunsan Hwamul Line is now closed, replaced with the Gunsan Port Line. The section between Gunsan and Iksan has been merged with the Janghang Line)
- Jeongseon Line: Replaced with Mugunghwa-ho

== See also ==
- Korail
- Railroads in South Korea
- Transportation in South Korea
