= DeRoI-class locomotive =

DeRoI-class locomotive was a group of Korean electric locomotives. There are 3 kinds different in the specification depending on manufacturers.

- DeRoI-class locomotive (Mitsubishi)
- DeRoI-class locomotive (Toshiba)
- DeRoNi-class locomotive (Hitachi)
