= Hwacheon Dam =

Dam in Hwacheon County in South Korea

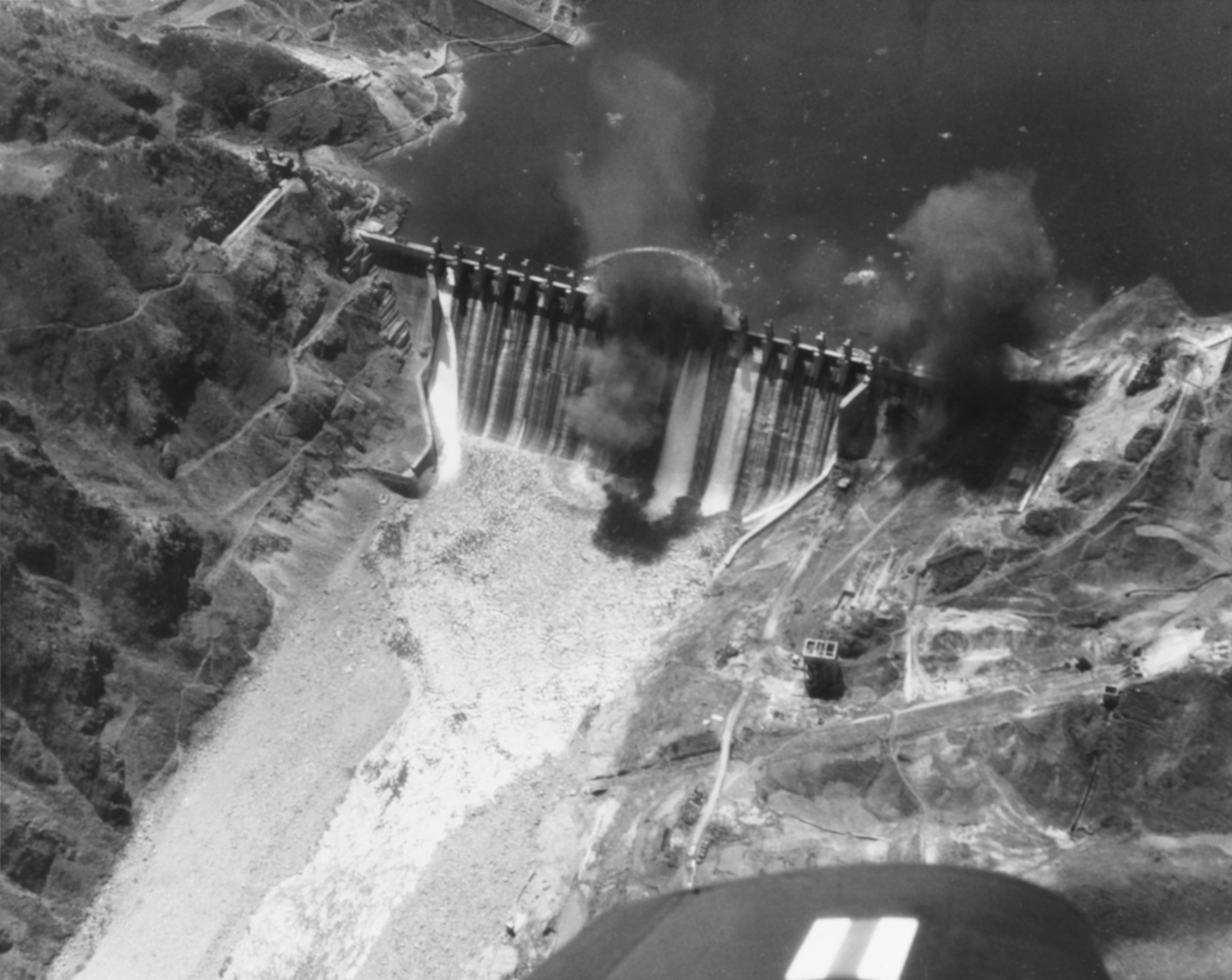
- Raid on Hwacheon Dam in May 1951

- Location within South Korea
- Official name: 화천댐
- Country: South Korea
- Location: Hwacheon County
- Coordinates: 38°07′02″N 127°46′44″E
- Construction began: 1939
- Opening date: 1944
- Owner: Korea Hydro & Nuclear Power Co.

Dam and spillways
- Height: 81.5 m (267 ft)
- Length: 435 m (1,427 ft)
- Spillway capacity: 5,428 m^{3}/s (191,688 cu ft/s)

Reservoir
- Total capacity: 1,018,000,000 m^{3} (825,306 acre⋅ft)
- Catchment area: 3,901 km^{2} (1,506 sq mi)
- Surface area: 38.9 km^{2} (15 sq mi)

Power Station
- Commission date: May 1944
- Hydraulic head: 74.5 m (244 ft) (effective)
- Turbines: 4 x 27 MW
- Installed capacity: 108 MW

- Hwacheon Dam
- Hangul: 화천댐
- Hanja: 華川댐
- RR: Hwacheon daem
- MR: Hwach'ŏn taem

Hwacheon Dam (Korean: 화천댐) is a concrete gravity dam on the North Han (Pukhan) River in Hwacheon County, Gangwon-do Province, South Korea. The dam was completed in 1944 as a primary source of electricity in southern Korea. It was the focal point of a raid during the Korean War and also provides flood protection from North Korea's Imnam Dam upstream.

== Background ==
The dam was constructed by the Japanese during their occupation of Korea in World War II. The Han River Hydroelectric Company began construction in July 1939 and the dam was complete in October 1944. Several months prior in May, the first generator of the power plant was operational, the second that October. The third generator was operational in 1957 and the last of the four generators was installed in 1968. Before the upstream Peace Dam was completed in 2005, the Hwacheon Dam served as the first line-of-defense for a collapse or excess discharge from the Imnam Dam in North Korea.

=== Korean War raid ===
At midnight 8 April 1951, North Korean and Chinese forces released excess water from the dam's spillway which disabled five floating bridges of the United Nations Command downstream. The dam was previously assessed as a problem and key facility in the area due to its hydroelectric power and ability to cause floods and droughts downstream areas. Capturing or disabling it became key. On 9 April, the 7th Cavalry Regiment, already executing Operation Rugged in the area, were charged with capturing the dam but were unsuccessful after encountering stiff defense. Between 16 and 21 April, Allies had secured the dam but were repelled by Chinese counterattack before being able to destroy the dam's floodgates. After B-29s failed to neutralize the dam, on 30 April, Skyraiders fired Tiny Tim rockets at and dropped a pair of 2,000-pound bombs on the dam, puncturing one spillway gate. On 1 May, Air Group 19 assaulted the dam with eight Skyraiders that were equipped with Mk 13 torpedoes and escorted by twelve Corsairs. Seven of eight torpedoes struck the dam and six exploded. The attack alleviated the dam as a flood threat, destroying one sluice gate and damaging several others. One of the participating U.S. Navy squadrons, VA-195 was renamed from Tigers to Dambusters. This raid constitutes the last time globally that an aerial torpedo was used against a surface target, and was the only time torpedoes were used in the Korean War.

== Design ==
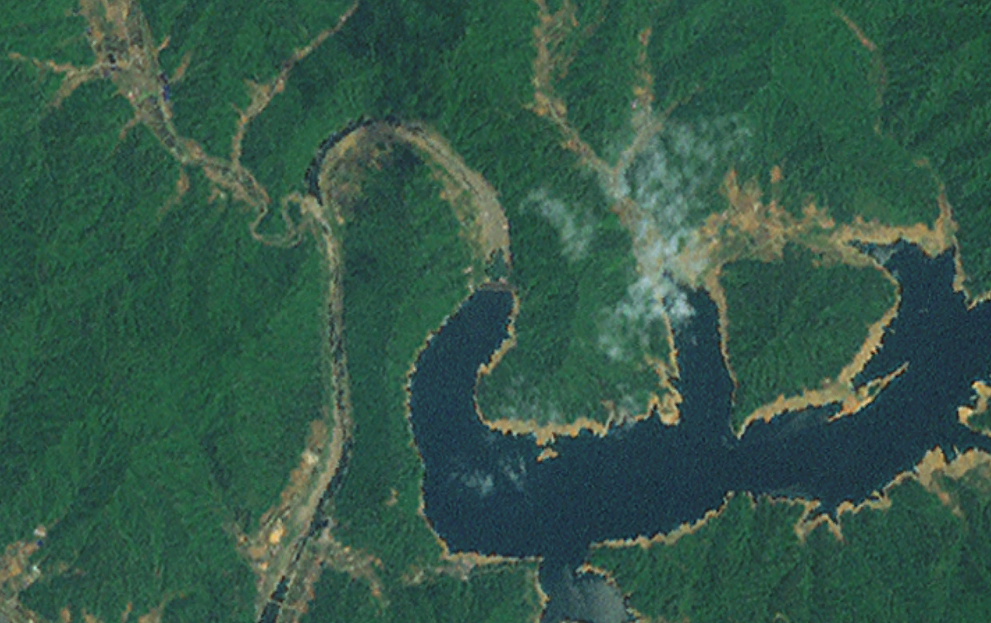
View of the dam (center of the image) from LandSat 7.

The dam is a 78 m (256 ft) tall and 435 m (1,427 ft) long concrete gravity-type. The dam sits at the head of a 3,901 km^{2} (1,506 sq mi) catchment area and its reservoir has a gross capacity of 1,018,000,000 m^{3} (825,306 acre⋅ft). Of this capacity, 809 million m^{3} can be regulated and 213 million m^{3} is used for flood control. The reservoir's surface area is 38.9 km^{2} (15 sq mi). The dam's spillway is controlled by 16 sluice gates and has a maximum discharge capacity of 5,428 m^{3}/s (191,688 cu ft/s). The dam's power station is located 2.5 km (2 mi) southwest of the dam at 38°05′56″N 127°45′44″E, just over a ridge. The power station contains four 27 MW turbine-generators and has an effective hydraulic head of 74.5 m (244 ft).

== See also ==
- List of power stations in South Korea
- Sup'ung Dam
