= Buyongsan (Chuncheon and Hwacheon) =

Mountain in South Korea

Highest point
- Elevation: 882 m (2,894 ft)

Geography
- Location: South Korea

Korean name
- Hangul: 부용산
- Hanja: 芙蓉山
- RR: Buyongsan
- MR: Puyongsan

Buyongsan (Korean: 부용산) is a mountain in Gangwon Province, South Korea. Its area extends across Chuncheon and Hwacheon County. Buyongsan has an elevation of 882 m (2,894 ft).

== See also ==
- List of mountains in Korea
