= DeRoI-class locomotive (Mitsubishi) =

Class of 3 electric locomotives built by Mitsubishi

Chosen Government Railway DeRoI class (デロイ) Korean State Railway Chŏngisŏ class (전기서) Korean National RR Dero3 class (데로3)
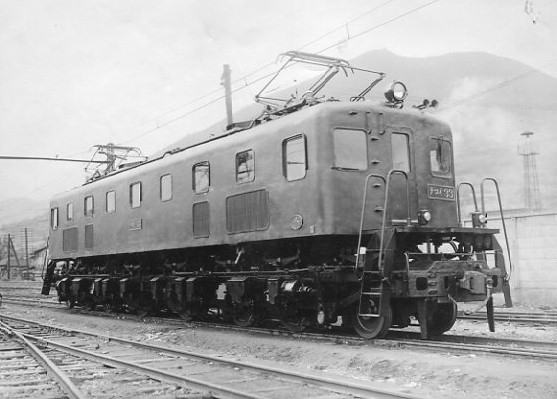
- Builder's photo of DeRoI-33
Type and origin
- Power type: Electric
- Designer: Shinichi Matsuda, Saneyoshi Hirota
- Builder: Mitsubishi
- Build date: 1946
Specifications
- Configuration
  - UIC: 1C-C1
- Gauge: 1,435 mm (4 ft 8 1/2 in)
- Wheel diameter: 1,370 mm (54 in)
- Trailing dia.: 860 mm (34 in)
- Wheelbase
  - Axle spacing (Asymmetrical): 1-2: 2,050 mm (6 ft 9 in); 2-3: 1,880 mm (6 ft 2 in); 3-4: 2,600 mm (8 ft 6 in)
- Pivot centres: 9,780 mm (32 ft 1 in)
- Length
  - Over body: 16,000 mm (52 ft 6 in)
- Width: 3,100 mm (10 ft 2 in)
- Height
  - Pantograph: 4,600 mm (15 ft 1 in)
  - Body height: 4,050 mm (13 ft 3 in)
- Loco weight: 138.5 t (305,000 lb)
- Electric system/s: 3,000 V DC
- Current pickup(s): Pantographs
- Traction motors: 6x MB-279-AFV
  - Continuous: 350 kW (470 hp)
- Gear ratio: 19:78=1:4.11
- Loco brake: Regenerative
- Train brakes: Elnar air brake, hand brake
- Compressor: 2x MC1 1,700 L (450 US gal)/min
- Couplers: AAR knuckle
Performance figures
- Maximum speed: 75 km/h (47 mph)
- Power output: 2.25 MW (3,020 hp)
- Tractive effort: 170.81 kN (38,400 lb_{f})
Career
- Operators: Chosen Government Railway; Korean National Railroad; Korean State Railway
- Class: CGR: デロイ DeRoI; KNR: 데로3 Dero3; KSR: 전기서 Chŏngisŏ
- Number in class: 3
- Numbers: CGR: デロイ31 - デロイ33; KNR: 데로3-1 - 데로3-3; KSR: 전기서1 - 전기서3

The Mitsubishi DeRoI-class (Japanese: デロイ) was a group of three boxcab-style electric locomotives with regenerative braking (type EL14AR) and the capability for multiple-unit control manufactured by Mitsubishi in 1946. They were very similar to the Toshiba-built DeRoI-class locomotives and the DeRoNi-class locomotives built by Hitachi. They were built for the Chosen Government Railway (Sentetsu), but the war ended before delivery took place. They were delivered to the Korean National Railroad after the partition of Korea, which designated them 데로3 ("Dero3"). During the Korean War all were captured by the Korean People's Army and taken to North Korea, where they were put into service by the Korean State Railway as the Chŏngisŏ (Korean: 전기서, "Electric 3") class.

== Description ==
The first electrified railway in Korea was the 29.7 km (18.5 mi) 1,067 mm (42.0 in) narrow gauge streetcar line in Seoul running from Seodaemun to Cheongnyang-ni via Cheongno and Dongdaemun, which was opened on 18 April 1898 by the Hanseong Electric Company. This was actually the first railway of any type in Korea, having preceded the 33.2 km (20.6 mi) Gyeongin Railway from Noryangjin to Jemulpo, which opened on 18 September 1899. The first electrified standard gauge mainline railway in Korea was the privately owned Geumgangsan Electric Railway, which on 1 August 1924 opened a 28.8 km (17.9 mi) line from Cheorwon to Geumhwa electrified at 1,500 V DC. Later, the line was extended from Cheorwon to Naegeumgang; the 116.6 km (72.5 mi) extension was opened on 1 July 1931.

The Government-General of Korea began working on a national electric power policy in November 1926, and the resulting plan was completed in December 1931. Chapter 4, "Utilising Electricity in Transportation in Korea" dealt with the electrification of Korea's railways. In 1937, a plan to electrify the Bokgye–Gosan section of the Gyeongwon Line, the Jecheon–Punggi section of the Gyeonggyeong Line and the Gyeongseong–Incheon Gyeongin Line was submitted to the Imperial Diet, which approved it in 1940. Sentetsu issued its requirement for an electric locomotive in 1938, beginning discussions with Mitsubishi in that year regarding the implementation of the electrification plan. Part of the Railway Bureau's goal with the electrification plan was to set a new world speed record, and to go with that, a state-of-the-art locomotive was desired. The project entailed many Japanese firsts, including the first use of 3,000 V electrification, and, specific to the DeRoI class locomotive, the first use of regenerative brakes. The resulting design was very similar to the EF12 class of the Japanese National Railways.

When the electrification of rail lines in Korea was begun in 1943, Sentetsu ordered twenty DeRoI class locomotives of 135 tons - sixteen from Toshiba and four from Mitsubishi The original class name, デロイ (DeRoI), comes from the Sentetsu classification system for electric locomotives: DeRoI = De, for "electric" (from 電気, denki), Ro, to indicate six powered axles (from Japanese roku, 6), and I (from Japanese ichi, 1), indicating the first class of electric locomotive with six powered axles.

Design work was undertaken by Mitsubishi, with Shinichi Matsuda designing the control circuits and Saneyoshi Hirota designing the main motor. The design was very similar to the EF12-class of the Japanese National Railways. The electrical components were manufactured by Mitsubishi Electric, while the mechanical components were produced by Mitsubishi's Mihara Vehicle Works.

Though generally quite similar in appearance to the Hitachi-built DeRoNi type and the Toshiba-built DeRoI type locomotives, there were a number of features that distinguished the Mitsubishi-built DeRoI class from the others. These included: equal spacing of side windows; a distinctive ventilator shape, including two relatively large ventilators; and a distinctive arrangement of the deck railings.

The four units ordered by Sentetsu were intended for use on the Kyŏnggyŏng Line, but none were completed by the end of the Pacific War; three were nearly complete. After the war, the Allied General Headquarters (GHQ) in Tokyo ordered the construction and delivery of a further ten units to Korea as war reparations, including the three near-complete Mitsubishi units. Mitsubishi-built units 31 and 32 were delivered in August 1946, while number 33, although likewise completed in June 1946, wasn't delivered until June 1948. The remaining, unfinished unit was scrapped at the factory. These were all delivered to the southern zone of occupation, but during the Korean War all three of the Mitsubishi-built DeRoI locomotives were captured and taken to the North.

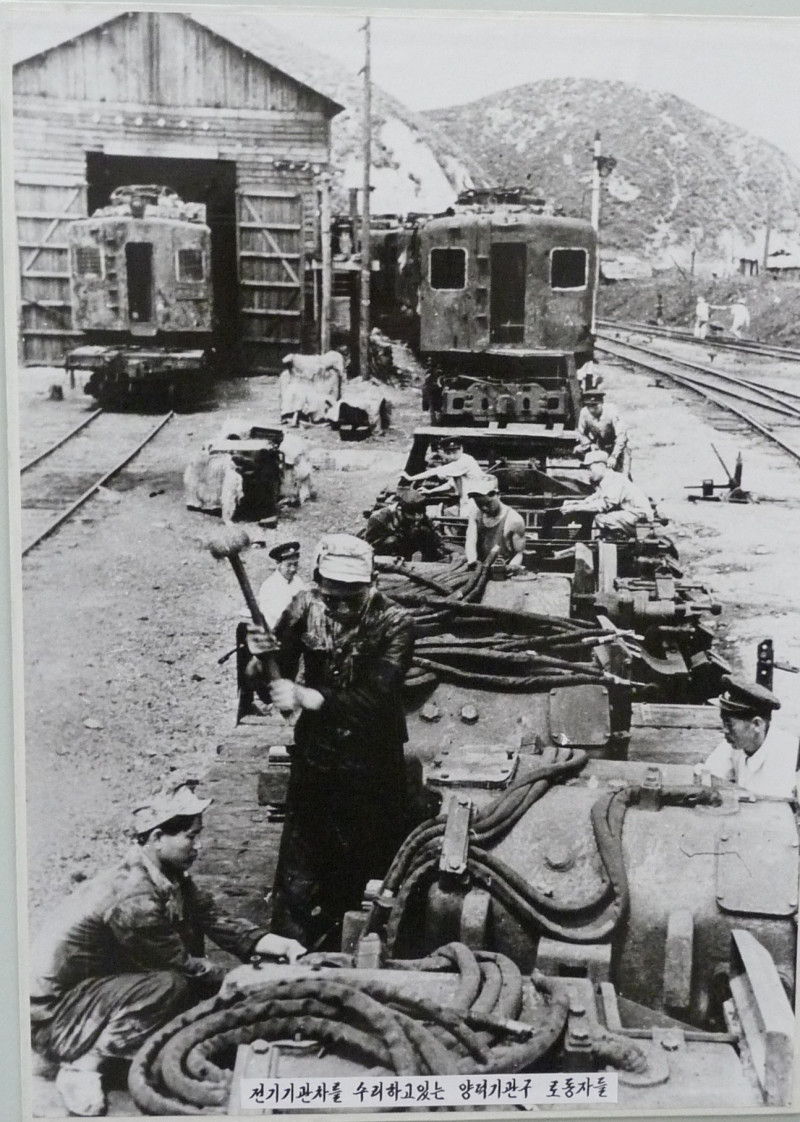
Refurbishment of DeRoI and DeRoNi class locomotives at Yangdŏk in 1956.

As the Korean War caused the destruction of the electrification of North Korea's rail lines, they sat disused until 1956. In that year they were reclassified Chŏngisŏ (전기서, "Electric-3") class and numbered 전기서1 through 전기서3, and were refurbished at the engine shops at Yangdŏk for use on the Yangdŏk-Ch'ŏnsŏng section of the P'yŏngra Line, which had been electrified in 1956 as the first stage of North Korea's electrification plans.

No information on the subsequent disposition of these locomotives is available at present.
