= Banamsan =

Mountain in South Korea

Highest point
- Elevation: 832 m (2,730 ft)

Geography
- Location: South Korea

Korean name
- Hangul: 반암산
- Hanja: 盤岩山
- RR: Banamsan
- MR: Panamsan

Banamsan (Korean: 반암산) is a mountain in Hwacheon County, Gangwon Province, South Korea. It has an elevation of 832 m (2,730 ft).

== See also ==
- List of mountains in Korea
