= Seongnyongsan =

Mountain in South Korea

Coordinates: 38°00′N 127°29′E

Highest point
- Elevation: 1,150 m (3,770 ft)

Geography
- Location: South Korea

Korean name
- Hangul: 석룡산
- Hanja: 石龍山
- RR: Seongnyongsan
- MR: Sŏngnyongsan

Seongnyongsan (Korean: 석룡산) is a mountain in South Korea. Its area extends across Pocheon, Gyeonggi Province and Hwacheon County, Gangwon Province. It has an elevation of 1,150 m (3,773 ft).

== See also ==
- List of mountains in Korea
