= Cheorwon =

Cheorwon or Chorwon may refer to:

- Cheorwon County (Korea), a historical county of Korea
- Cheorwon County, a county of South Korea
- Chorwon County, a county of North Korea
- Cheorwon station, South Korea
