= Hoemokbong =

Mountain in South Korea

Highest point
- Elevation: 1,027 m (3,369 ft)

Geography
- Location: South Korea

Korean name
- Hangul: 회목봉
- Hanja: 檜木峰
- RR: Hoemokbong
- MR: Hoemokpong

Hoemokbong (Korean: 회목봉) is a mountain between the counties of Hwacheon and Cheorwon, Gangwon Province, South Korea. It has an elevation of 1,027 m (3,369 ft).

== See also ==
- List of mountains in Korea
