= Bakdalbong =

Mountain in South Korea

Coordinates: 38°5′38.6″N 127°24′51.6″E

Highest point
- Elevation: 810 m (2,660 ft)

Geography
- Location: South Korea

Korean name
- Hangul: 박달봉
- Hanja: 朴達峰
- RR: Bakdalbong
- MR: Paktalbong

Bakdalbong (Korean: 박달봉) is a mountain in South Korea. It sits between Pocheon, Gyeonggi Province and Hwacheon county, Gangwon Province. Bakdalbong has an elevation of 810 m (2,657 ft).

== See also ==
- List of mountains in Korea
