= DeRoI-class locomotive (Toshiba) =

Class of 9 electric locomotives built by Toshiba

Chosen Government Railway DeRoI class (デロイ) Korean State Railway Chŏngiha class (전기하)
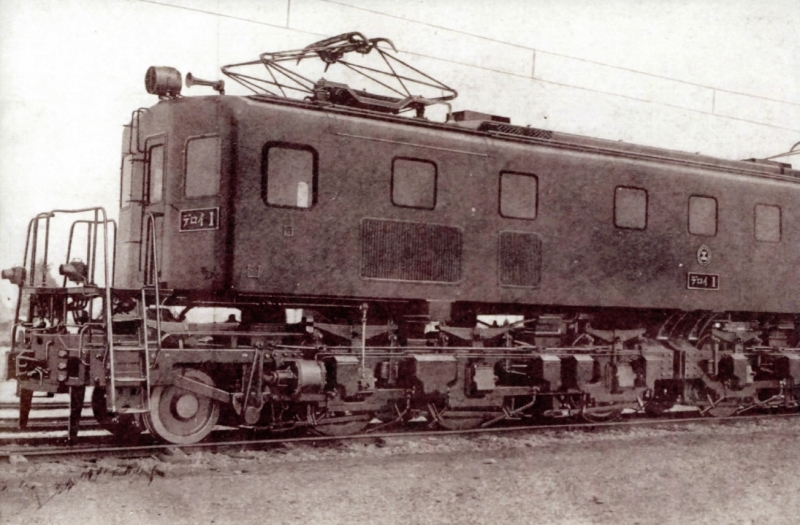
- Builder's photo of DeRoI-1
Type and origin
- Power type: Electric
- Designer: Shinichi Matsuda, Saneyoshi Hirota
- Builder: Kisha Seizō, Toshiba
- Build date: 1943–1944, 1947–1949
Specifications
- Configuration
  - UIC: 1C-C1
- Gauge: 1,435 mm (4 ft 8 1/2 in)
- Wheel diameter: 1,370 mm (54 in)
- Trailing dia.: 860 mm (34 in)
- Wheelbase
  - Axle spacing (Asymmetrical): 1-2: 2,050 mm (6 ft 9 in); 2-3: 1,880 mm (6 ft 2 in); 3-4: 2,600 mm (8 ft 6 in)
- Pivot centres: 9,780 mm (32 ft 1 in)
- Length
  - Over body: 16,000 mm (52 ft 6 in)
- Width: 3,100 mm (10 ft 2 in)
- Height
  - Pantograph: 4,550 mm (14 ft 11 in)
  - Body height: 4,050 mm (13 ft 3 in)
- Adhesive weight: 108 t (238,000 lb)
- Loco weight: 135 t (298,000 lb)
- Electric system/s: 3,000 V DC
- Current pickup: Pantographs
- Generator: 1x MG1
- Traction motors: 6x MT1
  - Continuous: 385 kW (516 hp)
- Gear ratio: 19:78=1:4.11
- Loco brake: EL14AR Regenerative
- Train brakes: Elnar air brake, hand brake
- Compressor: 2x MC1 1,700 L (450 US gal)/min
- Couplers: AAR knuckle
Performance figures
- Maximum speed: 75 km/h (47 mph)
- Power output: 2.31 MW (3,100 hp)
- Tractive effort: 195.72 kN (44,000 lb_{f})
Career
- Operators: Chosen Government Railway; Korean State Railway
- Class: CGR: デロイ DeRoI; KSR: 전기하 Chŏngiha
- Number in class: 9
- Numbers: CGR: デロイ1 - デロイ9; KSR: 전기하1 - 전기하9

The Toshiba DeRoI-class (Japanese: デロイ) was a group of nine boxcab-style electric locomotives with regenerative braking (type EL14AR) and the capability for multiple-unit control manufactured by built by Toshiba in 1943–1944. They were very similar to the Mitsubishi-built DeRoI-class locomotives and the DeRoNi-class locomotives built by Hitachi. They were built for the Chosen Government Railway (Sentetsu), and after the partition of Korea were inherited by the Korean State Railway of North Korea, where they were known as the Chŏngiha (Korean: 전기하, "Electric 1") class.

== Description ==
The first electrified railway in Korea was the 29.7 km (18.5 mi) 1,067 mm (42.0 in) narrow-gauge streetcar line in Seoul running from Seodaemun to Cheongnyang-ni via Cheongno and Dongdaemun, which was opened on 18 April 1898 by the Hanseong Electric Company. This was the first railway of any type in Korea, having preceded the 33.2 km (20.6 mi) Gyeongin Railway from Noryangjin to Jemulpo, which opened on 18 September 1899. The first electrified standard-gauge mainline railway in Korea was the privately owned Geumgangsan Electric Railway, which on 1 August 1924 opened a 28.8 km (17.9 mi) line from Cheorwon to Geumhwa electrified at 1,500 V DC. Later, the line was extended from Cheorwon to Naegeumgang; the 116.6 km (72.5 mi) extension was opened on 1 July 1931.

The Government-General of Korea began working on a national electric power policy in November 1926, and the resulting plan was completed in December 1931. Chapter 4, "Utilising Electricity in Transportation in Korea", dealt with the electrification of Korea's railways. In 1937, a plan to electrify the Bokgye–Gosan section of the Gyeongwon Line, the Jecheon–Punggi section of the Gyeonggyeong Line, and the Gyeongseong–Incheon Gyeongin Line was submitted to the Imperial Diet, which approved it in 1940. Sentetsu issued its requirement for an electric locomotive in 1938, beginning discussions with Mitsubishi that year regarding the implementation of the electrification plan. Part of the Railway Bureau's goal with the electrification plan was to set a new world speed record; accordingly, a state-of-the-art locomotive was desired. The project entailed several Japanese firsts, including the first use of 3,000 V electrification and, specific to the DeRoI class locomotive, the first use of regenerative brakes. The resulting design was very similar to the EF12 class of the Japanese National Railways.

When the electrification of rail lines in Korea began in 1943, Sentetsu ordered twenty DeRoI class locomotives of 135 tons—sixteen from Toshiba and four from Mitsubishi. The original class name, デロイ (DeRoI), comes from the Sentetsu classification system for electric locomotives: DeRoI = De, for "electric" (from 電気, denki), Ro, to indicate six powered axles (from Japanese roku, 6), and I (from Japanese ichi, 1), indicating the first class of electric locomotive with six powered axles.

Though generally similar in appearance to the Hitachi-built DeRoNi class and the Mitsubishi-built versions of the DeRoI class, there were a number of features that distinguished the Toshiba-built DeRoI class from the others. These were unequal spacing of side windows, a distinctive ventilator shape, and a distinctive arrangement of the deck railings.

Although the major design work of the type was undertaken by Mitsubishi, the first DeRoI-type locomotives delivered to Sentetsu were those built by Toshiba; the first four were built by Kisha Seizō using Toshiba electrical components. DeRoI-1 arrived at Busan in December 1943, where it was assembled at Sentetsu's Busan works before being sent to Gyeongseong, where it was displayed to the public. As none of the planned electrification of Sentetsu lines had been completed, the first tests were carried out at Cheorwon Station under the 1,500 V electrification of the Geumgangsan Electric Railway. The sixteen units ordered from Toshiba were intended for use on the Kyŏngwŏn Line; however, only five had been delivered by the end of the Pacific War—numbers 1 through 3 were built in 1943 (June, August and December respectively), and numbers 4 and 5 in 1944 (January and October).

Although the Gyeonggyeong Line electrification was to have been the first to be undertaken, it was the Bokgye–Gosan section of the Gyeongwon Line where the first electrification was completed, in 1944. After a test of the 2,000 kW mercury rectifier transformer was carried out on 13 February, the first test trains were run on 27 and 28 March. Operation of revenue trains on the Bokgye–Gosan section was switched from steam to electric traction on 1 April 1944.

At the time of the partition of Korea after the end of the Pacific War, of the five Toshiba-built DeRoI class locomotives, four were in the North and one was in the South, in Seoul for repairs. After the partition, the Allied General Headquarters (GHQ) in Tokyo ordered the delivery of three Mitsubishi-built and seven Toshiba-built DeRoI class locomotives to Korea as reparations; these were delivered to the South. DeRoI 6 had been completed in November 1944 and taken to the port at Kobe, Japan, for delivery, but was subsequently returned to the factory; this became the first of the ten new locomotives to be delivered to Korea, in March 1946. Numbers 7 through 9 were built and delivered in 1947 (January, June and September respectively), while the last three, numbers 10 through 12, were completed in 1949; however, after the outbreak of the Korean War and the destruction of the incomplete electrification in the south, these three units were scrapped in Japan, never having been delivered. Of the locomotives delivered after the partition, all but one were eventually captured by the North Korean army and taken to the North; the eighth unit had been in storage at Pusan and was scrapped in 1958 without ever having been used. Thus, of the 16 units actually built, 15 ended up in the North.

Plans were made for Toshiba to build some DeRoI class locomotives for the Soviet Union as war reparations, but due to the escalation of the Cold War after 1949, these were never built.

As the Korean War caused the destruction of the electrification of North Korea's rail lines, they remained unused until 1956. In that year they were reclassified Chŏngiha (전기하) class and numbered 전기하1 through 전기하9, and were refurbished at the engine shops at Yangdŏk for use on the Yangdŏk-Ch'ŏnsŏng section of the P'yŏngra Line, which had been electrified in 1956 as the first stage of North Korea's electrification plans.

Originally painted brown, they were repainted in 1958–59 in a light blue over dark green livery to match the scheme that was made standard with the introduction of the Red Flag 1 class electric locomotives. At some point, the original pantographs were replaced with those of the type used on the Red Flag 1 class locomotives.

As of 2011, at least one, Chŏngiha 3, was still operational, based at Kowŏn. This unit was inspected by Kim Il Sung and, as such, is kept in a pristine state as a "historic monument of the Revolution".

== Construction ==
Original					Postwar		
Owner	Number	Builder	Year	Works no.	Owner	Number	Notes
CGR	デロイ1	Kisha Seizō	1943.6	2681	KSR	전기하1	
CGR	デロイ2	Kisha Seizō	1943.8	2682	KSR	전기하2	
CGR	デロイ3	Kisha Seizō	1943.12	2683	KSR	전기하3	Still in service as historical locomotive
CGR	デロイ4	Kisha Seizō	1944.1	2684	KSR	전기하4	
CGR	デロイ5	Toshiba	1944.10		KSR	전기하5	
CGR	デロイ6	Toshiba	1944.11		KNR	데로1-6	Delivered 1947. Captured during Korean War → KSR 전기하6
KNR	데로1-7	Toshiba	1947.1		-	-	Captured during Korean War KSR → KSR 전기하7
KNR	데로1-8	Toshiba	1947.6		-	-	In storage at Pusan, scrapped 1958
KNR	데로1-9	Toshiba	1947.9		-	-	Captured during Korean War KSR → KSR 전기하9
KNR	데로1-10	Toshiba	1949		-	-	Not delivered, scrapped in Japan
KNR	데로1-11	Toshiba	1949		-	-	Not delivered, scrapped in Japan
KNR	데로1-12	Toshiba	1949		-	-	Not delivered, scrapped in Japan

== Gallery ==
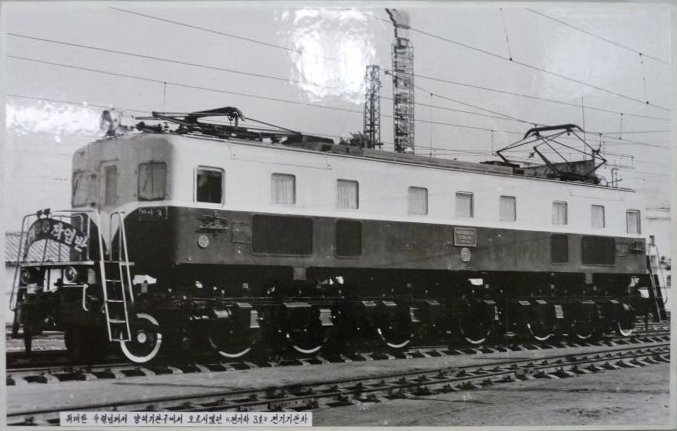
Electric Locomotive Chŏngiha-3 of the Korean State Railway.

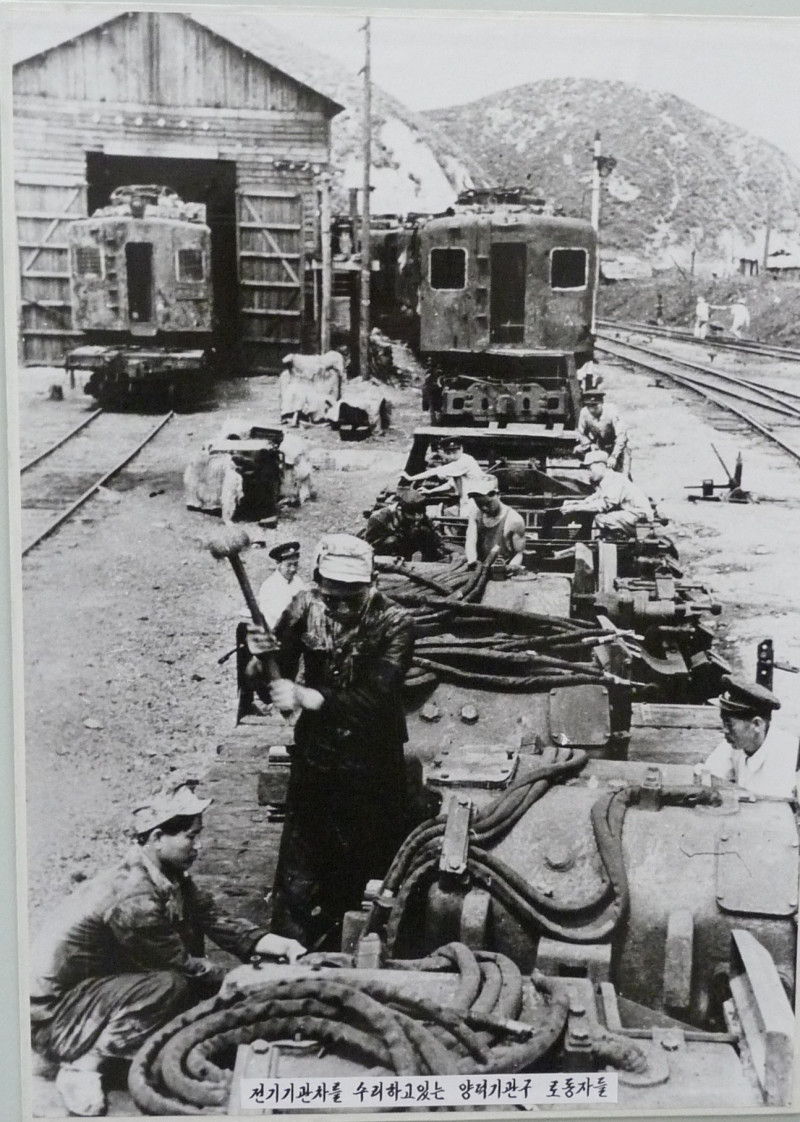
Refurbishment of DeRoI and DeRoNi class electrics at Yangdŏk in 1956

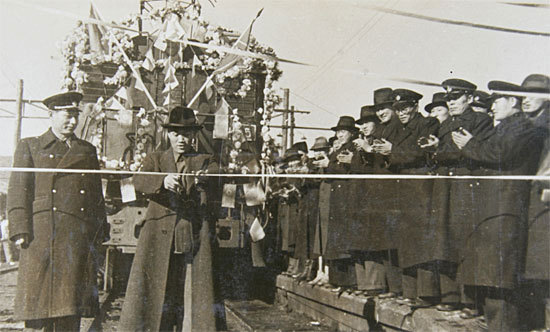
Chŏngiha 5 at the ceremony commemorating the completion of the electrification of the Yangdŏk–Sinch'ang section of the P'yŏngwŏn Line in 1948.
