= Peace Dam =

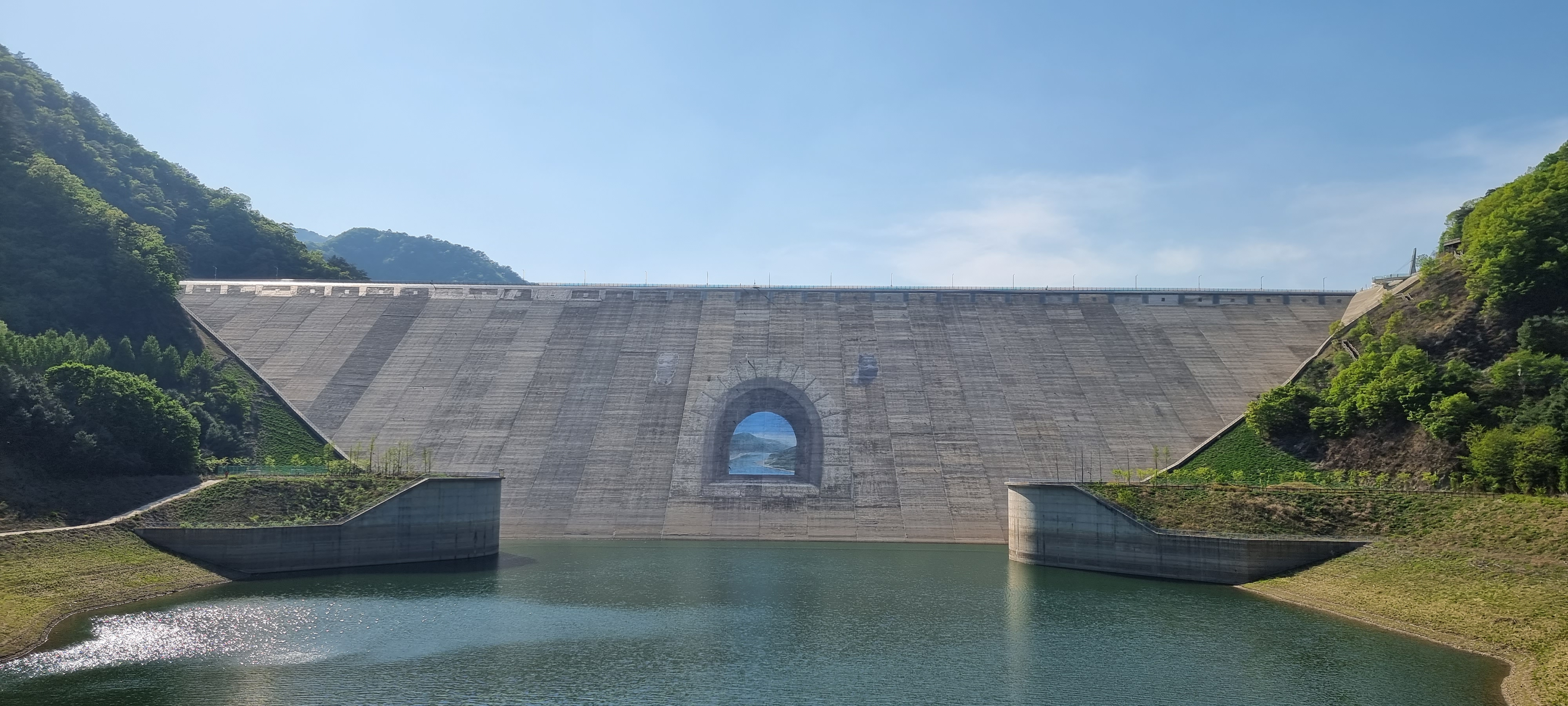
- View of Peace Dam from downstream
- Interactive map of Peace Dam
- Location: Hwacheon County, Gangwon Province, South Korea
- Coordinates: 38.208174°N 127.845411°E
- Construction began: 1987
- Opening date: 2005

Dam and spillways
- Impounds: Bukhan River
- Height: 410 ft (125 m)
- Length: 1970 ft (601 m)

- Peace Dam
- Hangul: 평화의 댐
- Hanja: 平和의 댐
- RR: Pyeonghwaui daem
- MR: P'yŏnghwaŭi taem

The Peace Dam (Korean: 평화의 댐) is a South Korean dam on the Bukhan River. It was built to stave off possible catastrophic flooding should the upstream Imnam Dam in North Korea collapse, either intentionally or by accident. The dam was completed in 2005. As it stands, the dam has no reservoir, and is merely preventive. Daelim Industrial Co,.Ltd, leading contractor for the Peace Dam construction project, began the construction in 2012 and ended in 2014. The design company for the project was Isan.

Construction began in 1987, in reaction to a perceived threat following the construction of the Imnam Dam by North Korea. The Bukhan River is a tributary of the Han River, and catastrophic scenarios foresaw a flood engulfing the South Korean capital of Seoul in case of an attack by North Korea. Construction was halted before completion, amidst allegations that the threat had been grossly exaggerated. Construction resumed after satellite photographs in 2002 revealed the existence of cracks in the Imnam Dam, triggering fears that it could collapse in case of heavy rains.

In September 2005, North Korea released massive quantities of water without warning, causing serious flooding just south of the border.

The Peace Dam is 601 meters wide, 125 meters tall, and capable of holding 2.61 billion tons of water. Its construction cost $429 million.
