= DeRoNi-class locomotive =

Electric locomotive

Chosen Government Railway DeRoNi class (デロニ) Korean State Railway Chŏngidu class (전기두)
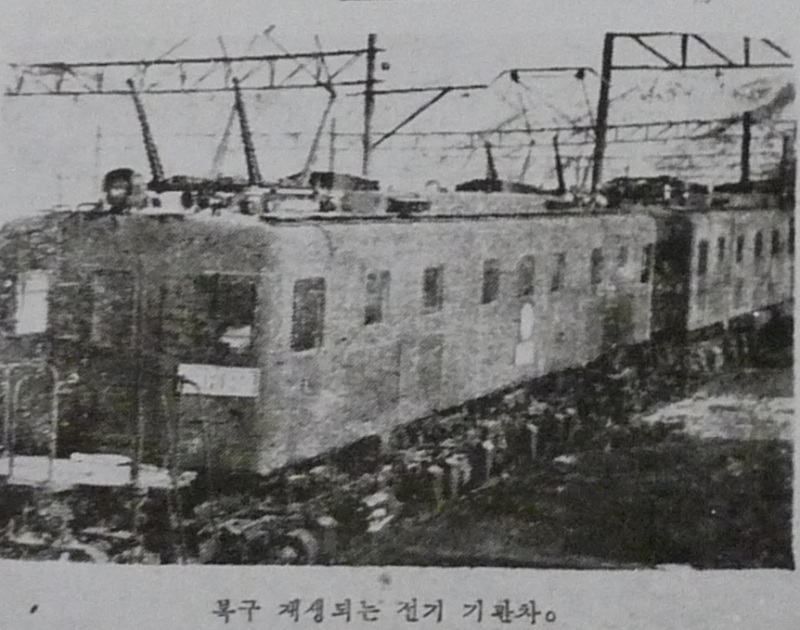
- A Chŏngidu class locomotive of the Korean State Railway
Type and origin
- Power type: Electric
- Builder: Hitachi
- Build date: 1943–1944
Specifications
- Configuration
  - UIC: 1C-C1
- Gauge: 1,435 mm (4 ft 8 1/2 in)
- Wheel diameter: 1,370 mm (54 in)
- Trailing dia.: 860 mm (34 in)
- Wheelbase
  - Axle spacing (Asymmetrical): 1-2: 2,050 mm (6 ft 9 in); 2-3: 1,880 mm (6 ft 2 in); 3-4: 2,600 mm (8 ft 6 in)
- Pivot centres: 9,780 mm (32 ft 1 in)
- Length
  - Over body: 16,800 mm (55 ft 1 in)
- Width: 3,100 mm (10 ft 2 in)
- Height
  - Pantograph: 4,750 mm (15 ft 7 in)
  - Body height: 4,050 mm (13 ft 3 in)
- Adhesive weight: 108 t (238,000 lb)
- Loco weight: 135 t (298,000 lb)
- Electric system/s: 3,000 V DC
- Current pickup(s): Pantographs
- Generator: 1x MG3
- Traction motors: 6x MT2
  - Continuous: 350 kW (470 hp)
- Gear ratio: 19:78=1:4.11
- Loco brake: EL14AR Regenerative
- Train brakes: Elnar air brake, hand brake
- Compressor: 2x MC2 1,700 L (450 US gal)/min
- Couplers: AAR knuckle
Performance figures
- Maximum speed: 75 km/h (47 mph)
- Power output: 2.1 MW (2,800 hp)
- Tractive effort: 171.79 kN (38,620 lb_{f})
Career
- Operators: Chosen Government Railway; Korean State Railway
- Class: CGR: デロニ DeRoNi; KSR: 전기두 Chŏngidu
- Number in class: 4
- Numbers: CGR: デロニ1 - デロニ4; KSR: 전기두1 - 전기두4

The DeRoNi-class (Japanese: デロニ) was a group of four boxcab-style electric locomotives with regenerative braking and the capability for multiple-unit control manufactured by Hitachi in 1943-44, very similar to the Toshiba-built DeRoI and the Mitsubishi-built DeRoI-class locomotives.

They were built for the Chosen Government Railway (Sentetsu), who designated them DeRoNi (デロニ) class, and after the partition of Korea were inherited by the North Korean State Railway, where they were known as the Chŏngidu (Korean: 전기두, "Electric 2") class.

== Description ==
The Government-General of Korea began working on a national electric power policy in November 1926, and the resulting plan was completed in December 1931. Chapter 4, "Utilising Electricity in Transportation in Korea" dealt with the electrification of Korea's railways. In 1937, a plan to electrify the Bokgye–Gosan section of the Gyeongwon Line, the Jecheon–Punggi section of the Gyeonggyeong Line and the Gyeongseong–Incheon Gyeongin Line was submitted to the Imperial Diet, which approved it in 1940. The Railway Bureau began implementation of the plan in 1938, and subsequently placed orders with Mitsubishi, Toshiba and Hitachi for 26 electric locomotives.

Sentetsu's order placed with Hitachi was for six electric locomotives intended for operation on the planned electrification of the Gyeongwon and Gyeonggyeong lines - four for the former and two for the latter. Of these, a total of four were delivered by war's end, 2 each in 1943 and 1944; these were designated DeRoNi class (デロニ) by Sentetsu, and numbered デロニ1 through デロニ4.

This class name, デロニ (DeRoNi), comes from the Sentetsu classification system for electric locomotives: DeRoNi = De, for "electric" (from 電気, denki), Ro, to indicate six powered axles (from Japanese roku, 6), and Ni (from Japanese ni, 2), indicating the second class of electric locomotive with six powered axles.

Though generally quite similar in appearance to the DeRoI-class locomotives, there were a number of features that distinguished the DeRoNi class from those. These were: equally spaced side windows; a distinctive ventilator shape; a distinctive arrangement of the deck railings; three-point electrical connectors mounted vertically at the centre of the end decks like on Soviet VL19 class; they were slightly longer and slightly more streamlined than the DeRoI locomotives.

After the end of the Pacific War, at the time of the partition of Korea, all four of the DeRoNi locomotives remained in the North. These were operated on the Kosan-Pokkye segment of Kangwŏn Line prior to the Korean War. As the Korean War caused the destruction of the electrification of North Korea's rail lines, they sat disused until 1956, when they were reclassified Chŏngidu (전기두) class and numbered 전기두1 through 전기두4. They were then refurbished at the engine shops at Yangdŏk for use on the Yangdŏk-Ch'ŏnsŏng section of the P'yŏngra Line, which had been electrified in 1956 as the first stage of North Korea's electrification plans.

Originally painted brown, they were repainted in 1958–1959 in the light blue over dark green livery to match the scheme that was made standard with the introduction of the Red Flag 1 class electric locomotives.

No information on the subsequent disposition of these locomotives is available at present.

== Gallery ==
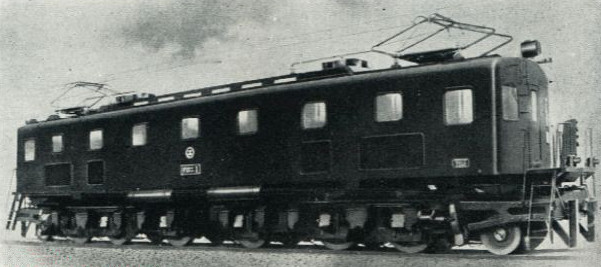
デロニ1 as built in 1943.

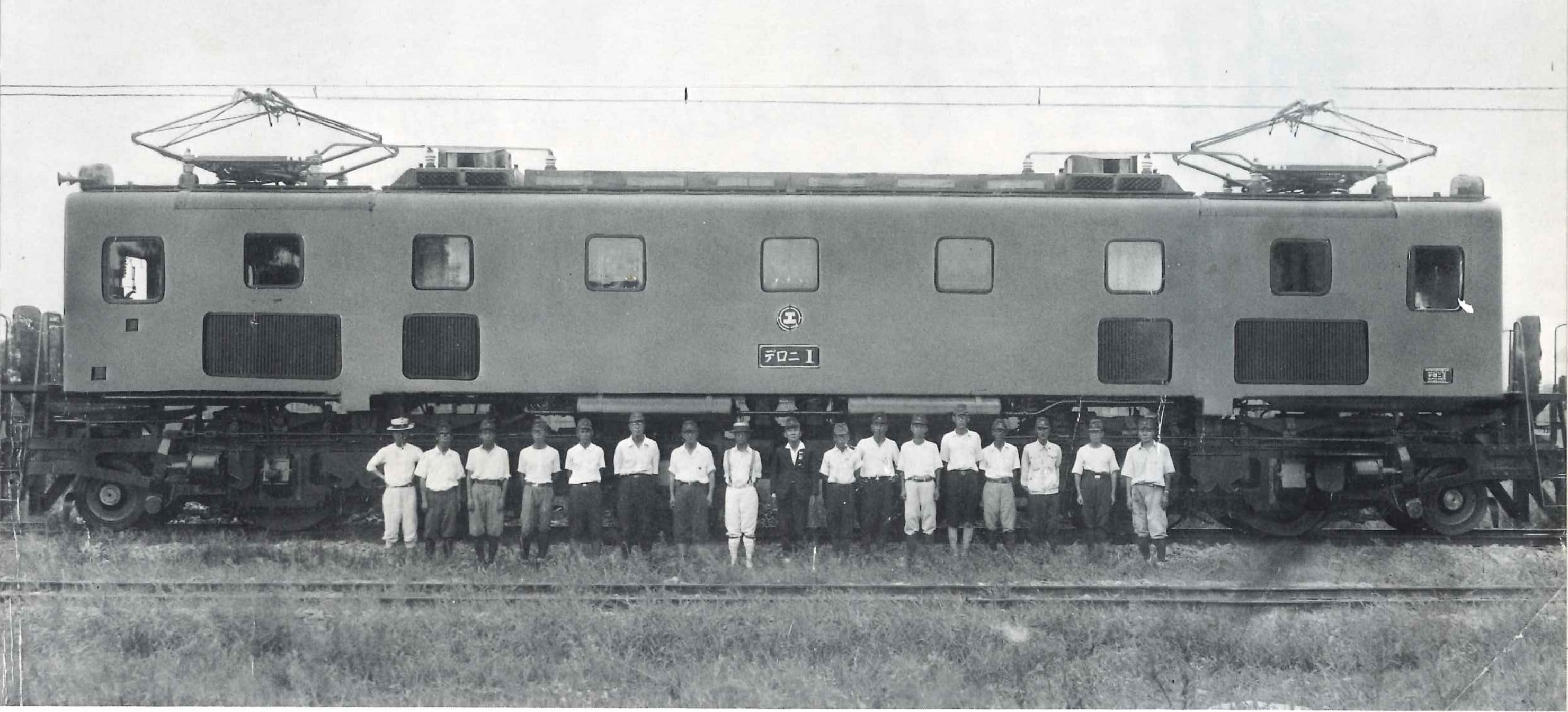
Another view of デロニ1 in 1943.

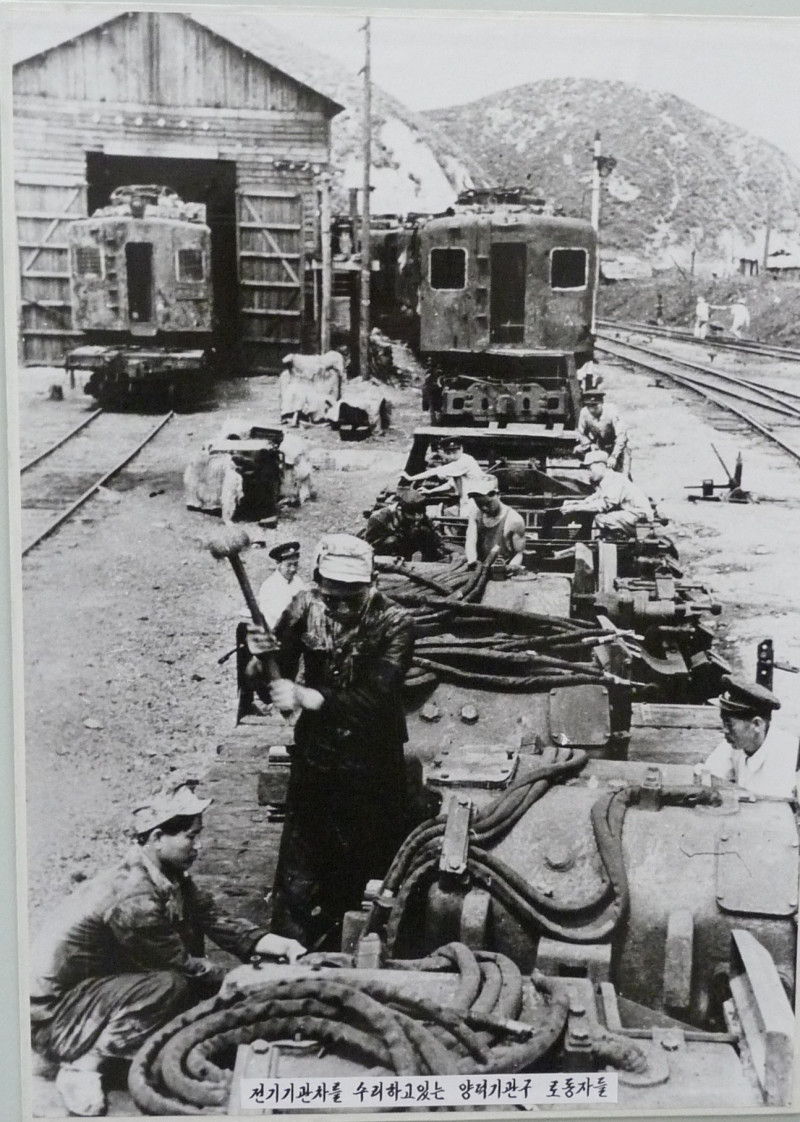
Refurbishment of DeRoI and DeRoNi class locomotives at Yangdŏk in 1956.
