= Imnam Dam =

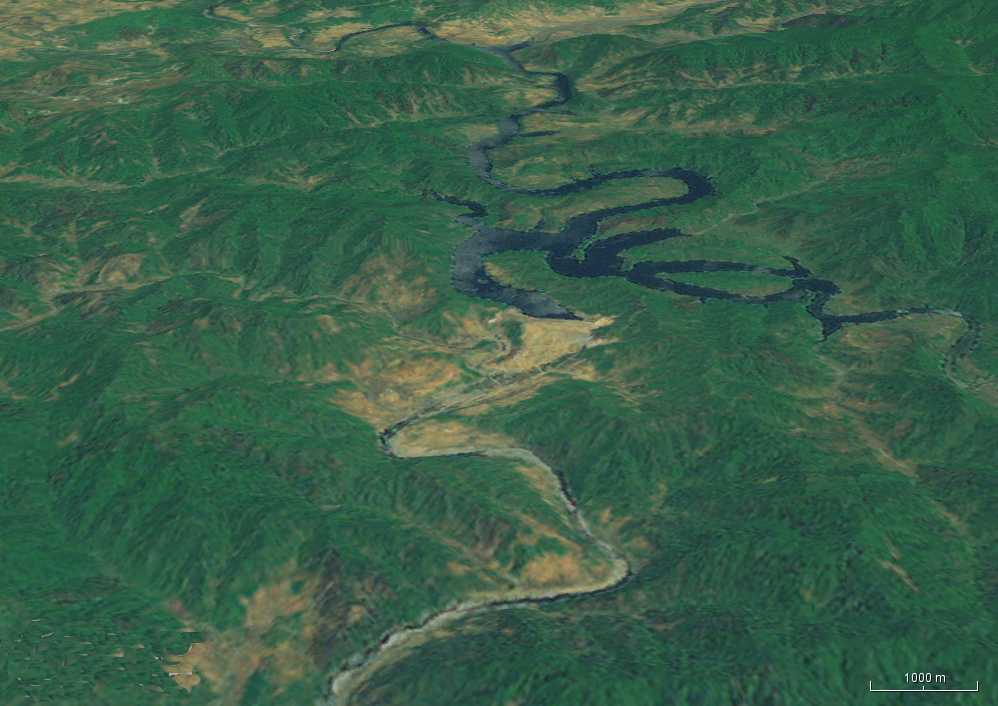
- View of the dam as seen by Landsat, 3D elevation model (yellow item in the middle of the image).

- Location within North Korea
- Location: Kimhwa County, Kangwon Province, North Korea
- Coordinates: 38°25′21″N 127°47′32″E
- Construction began: 1986
- Opening date: 2003

Dam and spillways
- Impounds: Bukhan River
- Height: 399 ft (122 m)
- Length: 2,329 ft (710 m)

- Imnam Dam
- Hangul: 임남언제
- Hanja: 任南堰堤
- Revised Romanization: imnam eonje
- McCune–Reischauer: imnam ŏnje

Imnam Dam (Korean: 임남언제) is a dam on the Bukhan River in North Korea, completed in 2003.

Construction began in 1986. The dam was immediately seen as a threat by the South Korean government. The Bukhan River is a tributary of the Han River, and war scenarios foresaw North Korea releasing flood waters that could engulf the South Korean capital of Seoul. Though fears of a "water attack" have diminished, 2002 satellite photos of cracks in the North Korean dam caused fears it could collapse following heavy rains. In September 2005, without warning, North Korea released a massive amount of water from the dam, causing large floods in South Korea.

To protect itself against the perceived threat, South Korea built the Peace Dam across the border, 22 miles to the south.

Since Imnam Dam was built, water inflow to the Han River has decreased by 12 percent. This has caused environmental problems and water shortages in the Seoul metropolitan area.

Imnam Dam is 710 meters wide, 121.5 meters high, and has a claimed capacity of 2.62 billion tons of water.
