= Cheorwon station =

Closed railway station in South Korea

Coordinates: 38°16′37″N 127°11′48″E

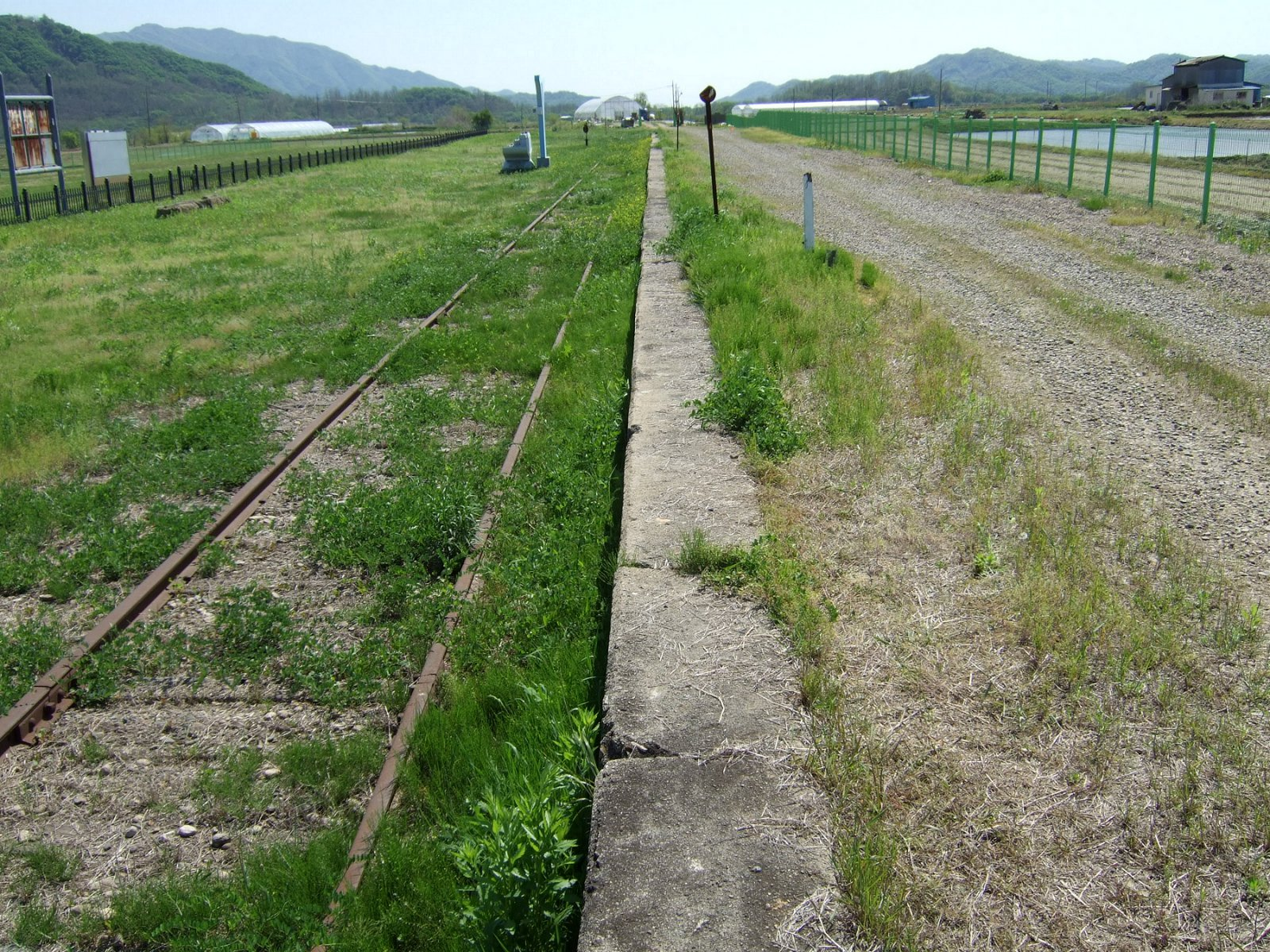
Abandoned station platform, seen in 2013.

Cheorwon station is a closed railway station on the Gyeongwon Line in South Korea. This station was also the starting point of the former Geumgangsan Line.

It was originally opened by the Chosen Government Railway on 21 October 1912 as part of the 24.1 km (15.0 mi) long Yeoncheon–Cheorwon section of the Gyeongwon Line. After the partition of Korea in 1945, the station was located in North Korea, where it was operated by the Korean State Railway as part of the northern section of the Gyeongwon Line until September 1950. It was closed in 1950 due to the Korean War, but was restored and reopened as a museum in 1988.

== Gallery ==
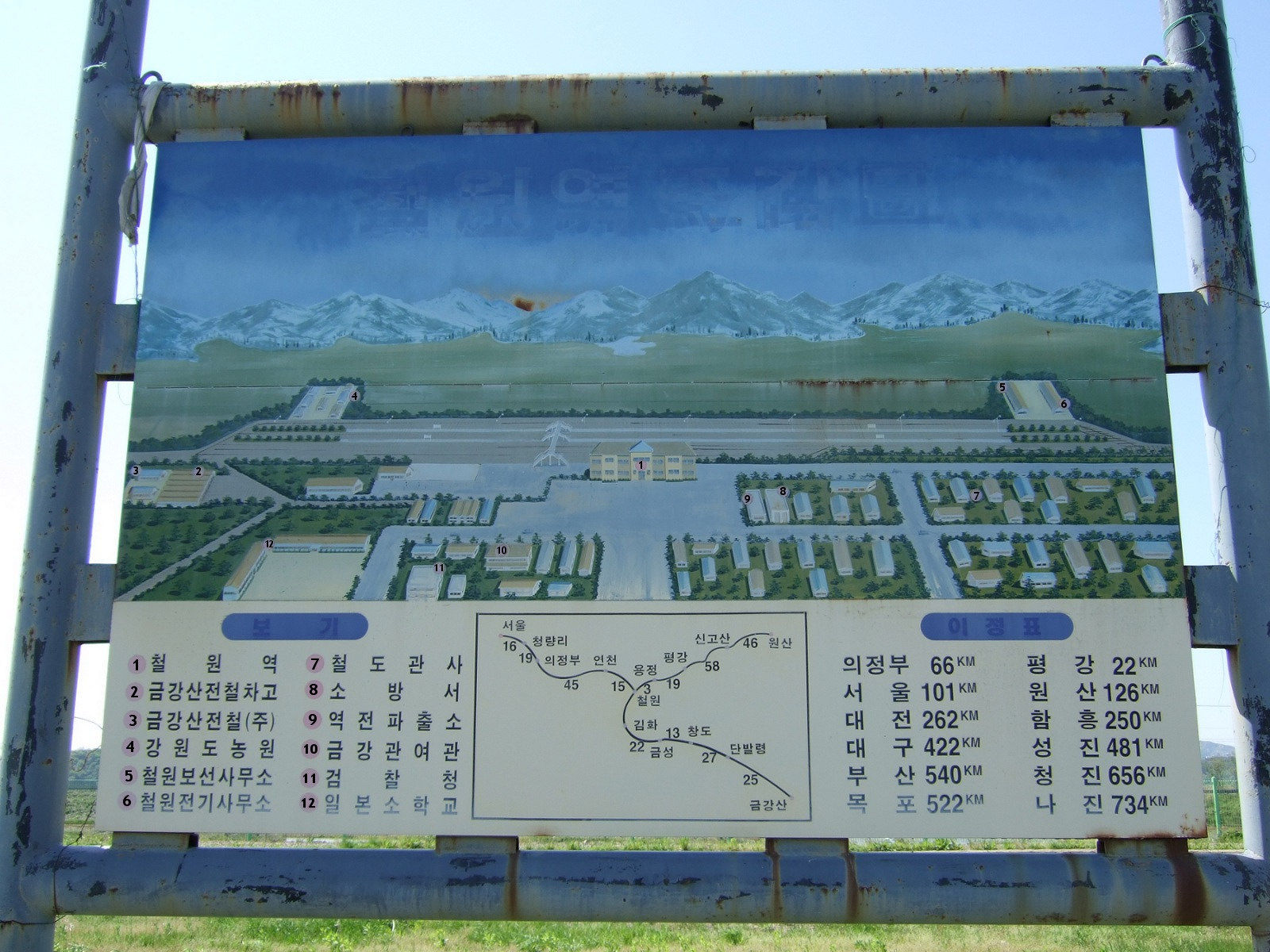
Diagram of the original station

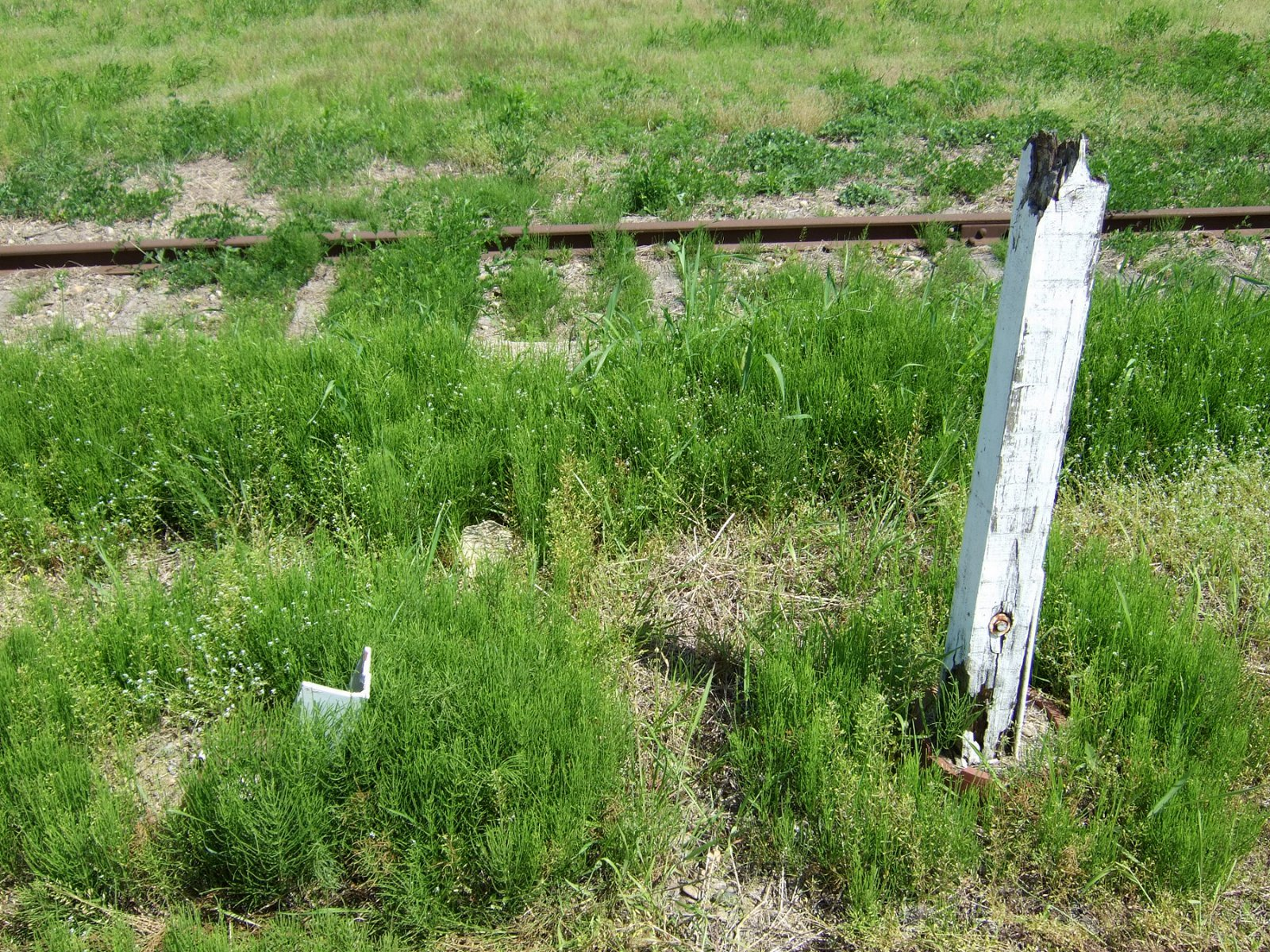
Broken platform sign

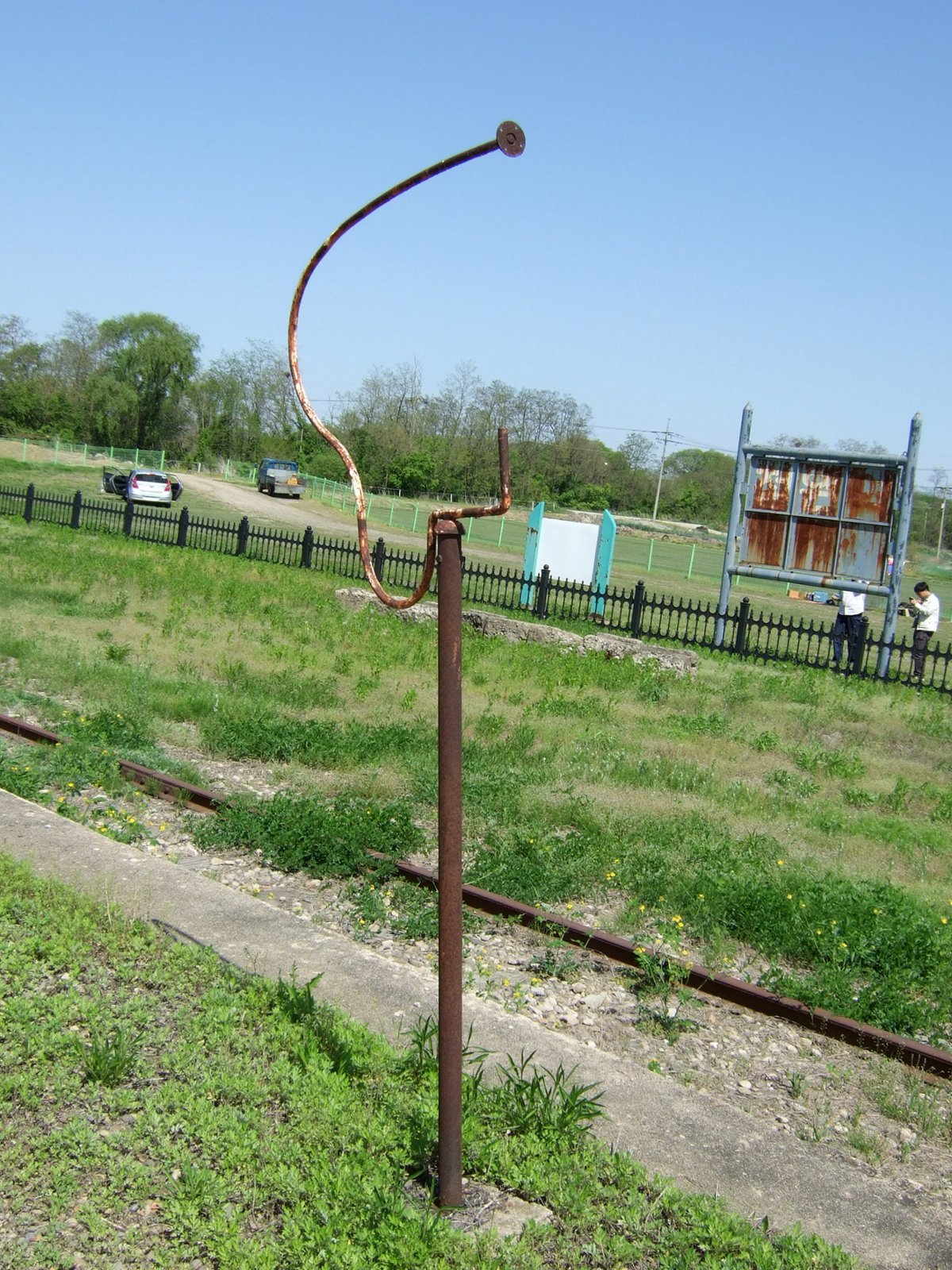
Mail hook on the platform

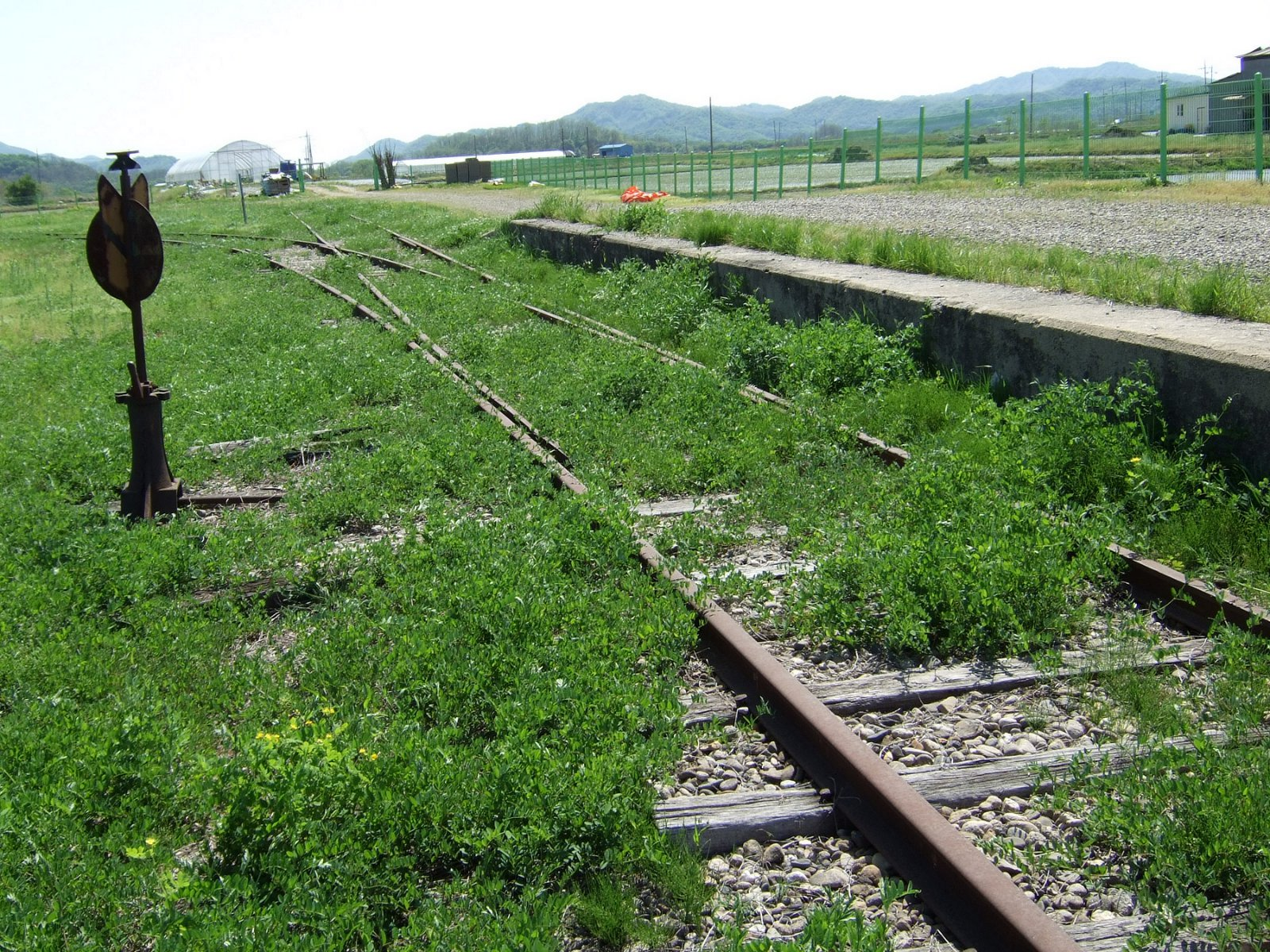
The track towards Baengmagoji and Yongsan

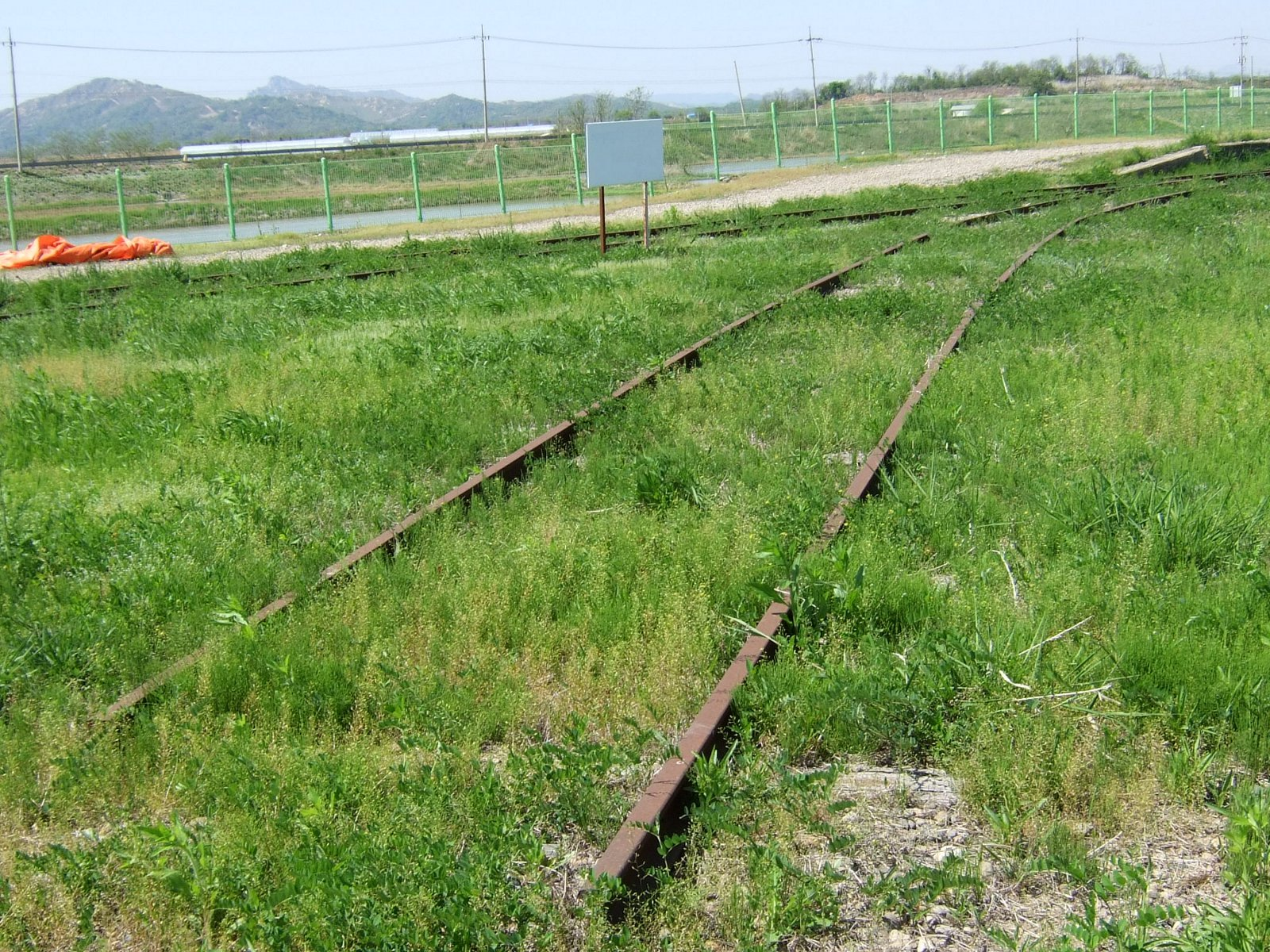
Track of the former Geumgangsan Electric Railway

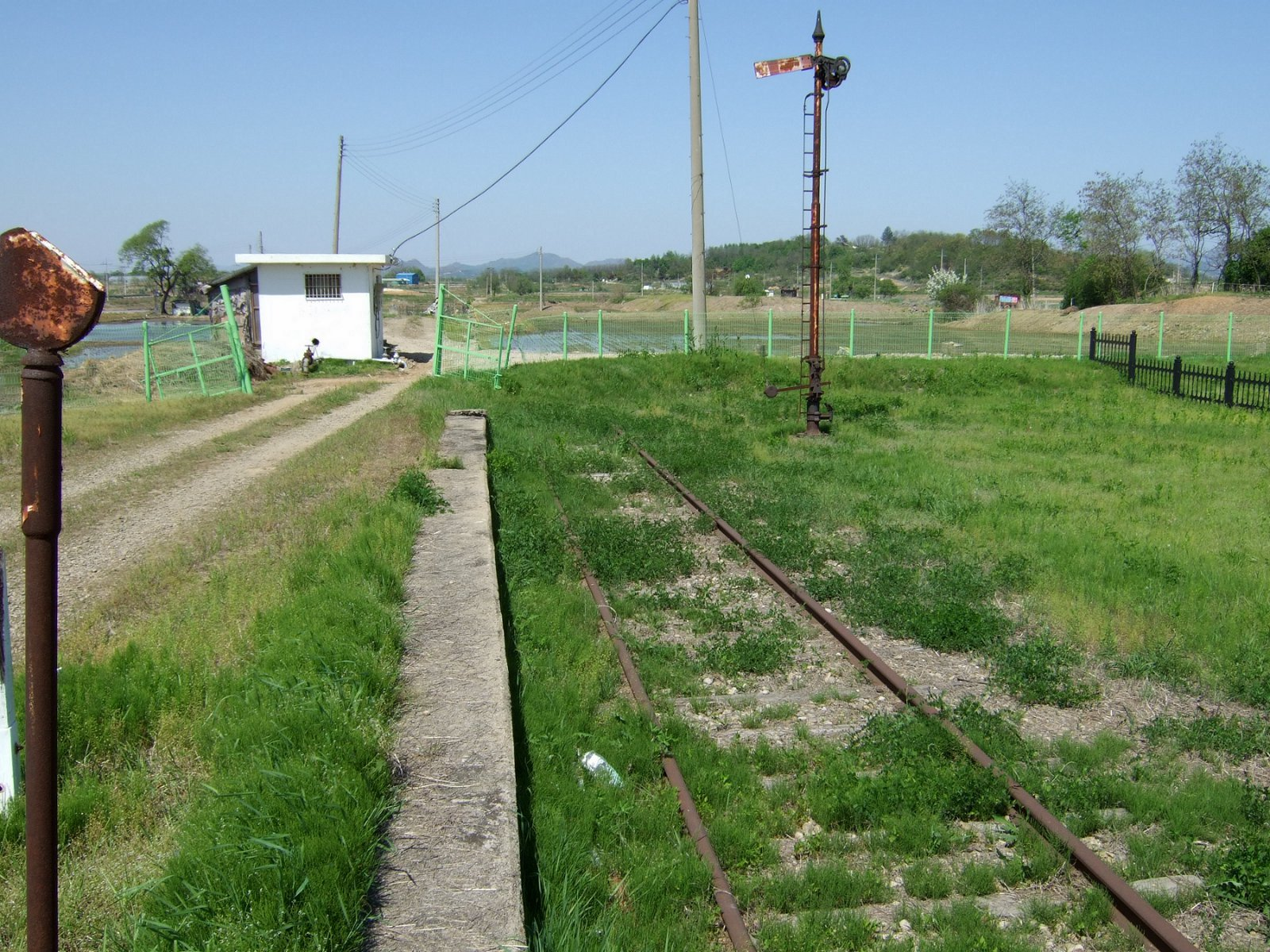
The track towards Woljeongni and Wonsan

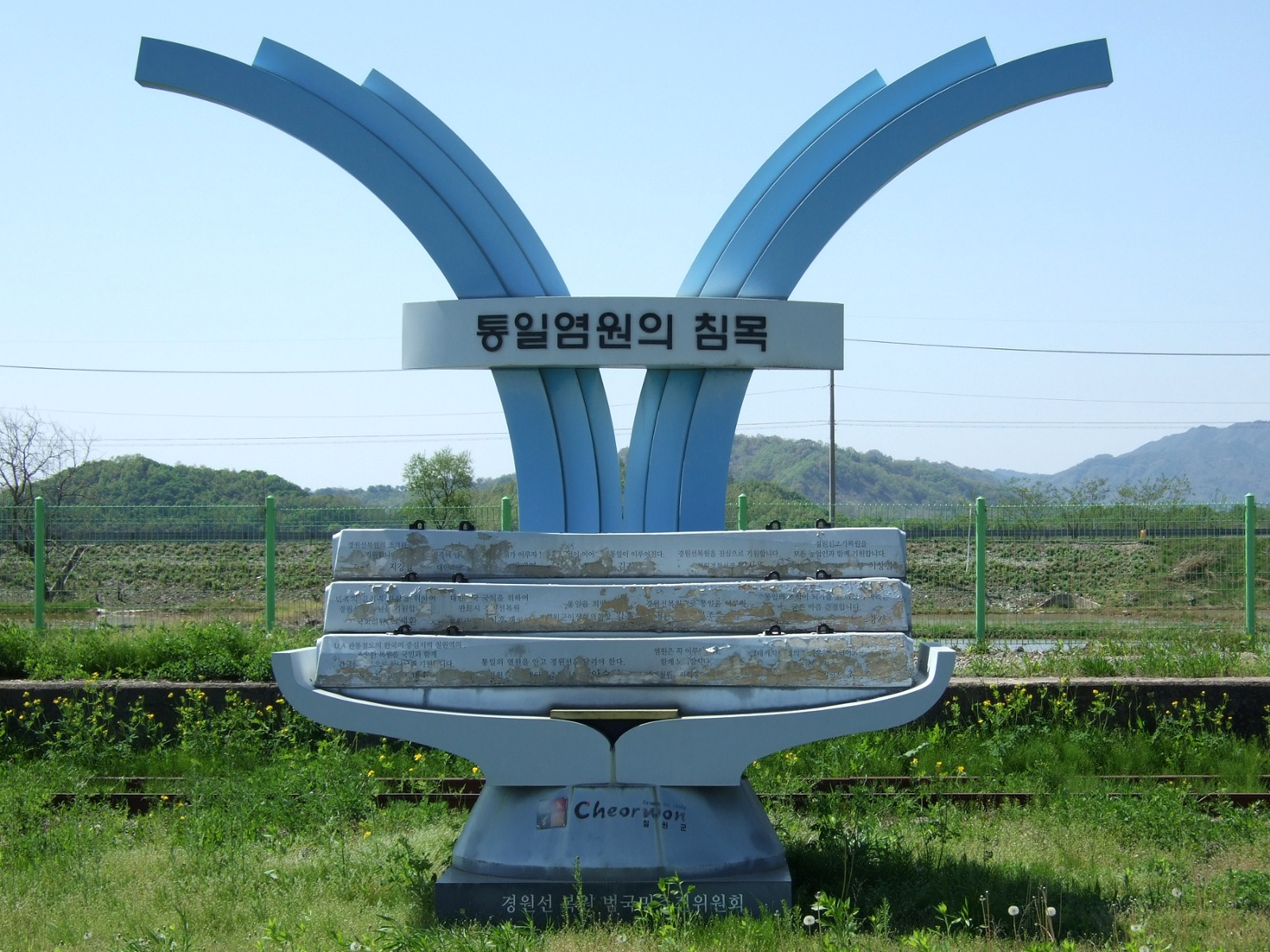
Unification monument
