= Hwacheon County =

Coordinates: 38°06′27″N 127°42′52″E

Hwacheon
- County
- Panoramic view of Hwacheon-eup

- Flag Emblem of Hwacheon

- Location in South Korea
- Country: South Korea
- State: Gangwon
- Administrative divisions: 1 eup, 4 myeon

Area
  - Total: 909.45 km^{2} (351.14 sq mi)

Population (September 2024)
  - Total: 22,965
  - Density: 26.2/km^{2} (68/sq mi)

Korean name
- Hangul: 화천군
- Hanja: 華川郡
- RR: Hwacheon-gun
- MR: Hwach'ŏn-gun

Hwacheon County (Korean: 화천군) is a county in the state of Gangwon-do, South Korea. The northern border is, in some places, within nine kilometres of the Korean Demilitarized Zone. Neighboring counties are Cheorwon to the northwest and north, Yanggu to the east, Chuncheon to the south, and the Gyeonggi-do province to the southwest. The county consists largely of mountains and rivers, between which are small farming communities, military bases and military training grounds. The area is renowned for its rivers, lake trout, indigenous otters, and natural scenery.

== Demographics ==
As of 2005, the population of Hwacheon stood at 23,822. 12,471 of these people were male; 11,351 were female. Only 90 of these people (0.38%) were foreign residents - 20 male and 70 female. The average household was home to 2.4 people, and 3,577 of the population (15%) was aged 65 or older. These numbers do not reflect soldiers stationed in the area, which are estimated at approximately 35,000 personnel.

== Administrative divisions ==
The county administers 4 myeon and 1 eup.

- Hwacheon-eup
- Gandong-myeon
- Sangseo-myeon
- Sanae-myeon
- Hanam-myeon

== History ==
=== Prehistory and the Three Kingdoms period ===
Artifacts from the Neolithic period were found in Wirari area in 1964.An ancient residential area was found in Yongamri. The discovery of the remains in Woncheonri in 2011 showcased the presence of Baekje influence in the region.

=== Goryeo and Joseon periods ===
The region was called Nangcheon County during the Goryeo period, and was a dependent county of Chuncheon. In 1644, the county was abolished and was merged under Kimhwa County, but the county was restored in 1653.The county received its current name in 1897.

=== Modern history ===
Before 1900, Hwacheon was extremely sparsely populated, with only a few small villages alongside major rivers, due to its rugged terrain and harsh winters. In 1919, the region participated in protests as part of the March 1st movement on March 23 and March 28, with the March 23 protest led by Cheondoists. Hwacheon Dam was completed in 1944 and the electricity it generated proved to be a boon. After liberation of korea in 1945, the region was initially administered by the DPRK until the ROK took administration from the DPRK during the korean war. The region was the source of conflict during the Korean War due to its strategic value as both a power plant and potential weapon (by intentionally flooding downstream areas). It ended up well inside allied territory with the establishment of the DMZ to the north in 1953.

== Culture ==
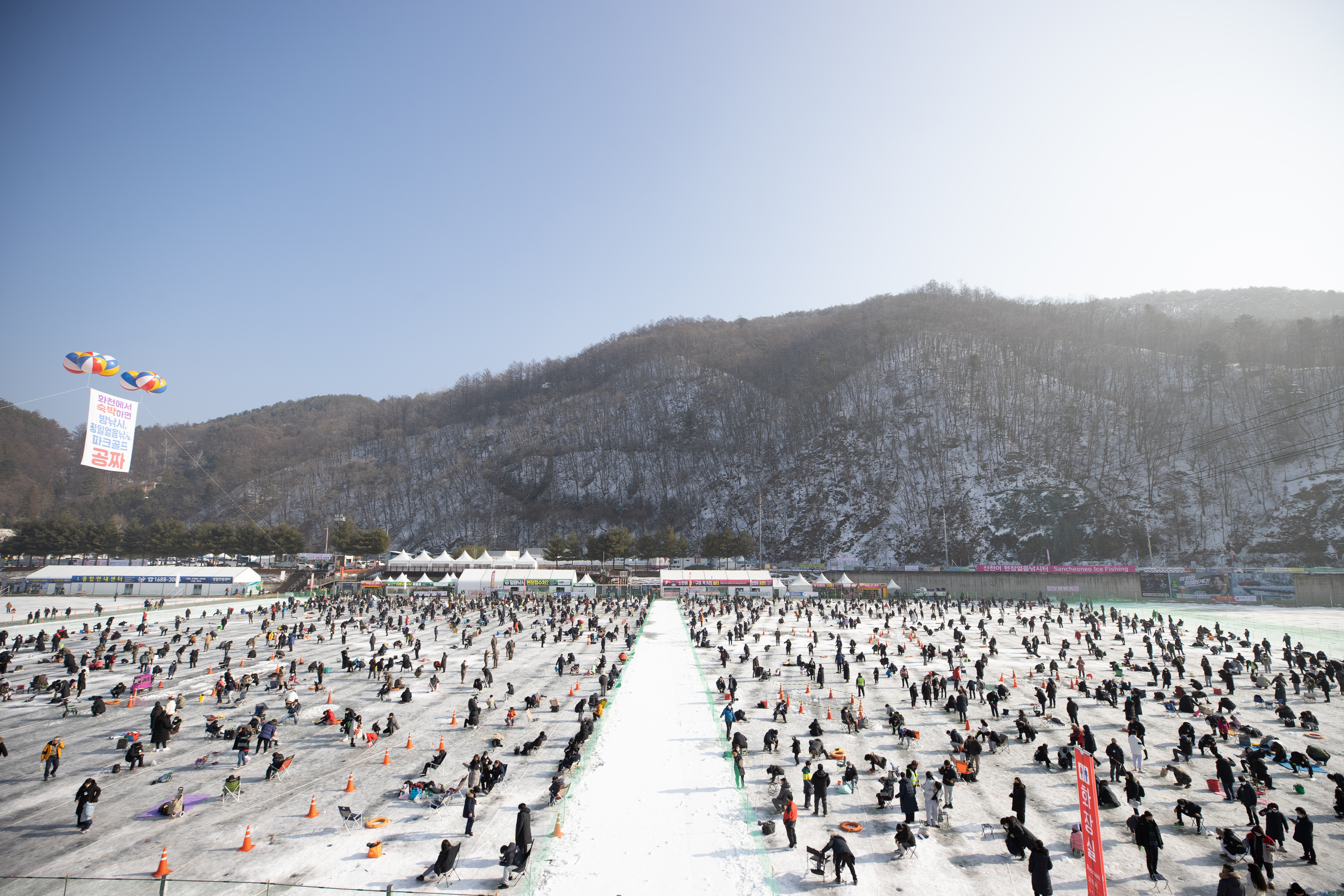
Hwacheon Sancheoneo Festival

As Gangwon Province is South Korea's coldest region, Hwacheon is home to the yearly Hwacheon Sancheoneo ice fishing festival in which thousands of visitors try to catch as many sancheoneo (Korean: 산천어, wild trout) as possible. This takes place in the Hwacheoncheon (stream) during nearly the entire month of January. The festival organizers claim there are roughly 1,000,000 visitors annually. The Hwacheon Sancheoneo Festival is classified by CNN as one of the 7 wonders of winter.

Other annual events in Hwacheon include the jjokbae (Korean: 쪽배, water raft) Festival in late July, the Tomato Festival in mid-August, and the Dragon Festival.

== Food ==
Hwacheon is famous for its samgyeopsal, a pork dish offered at nearly every restaurant in town. Pork is cooked on a grill over hot coals, cut into bite-sized pieces, and wrapped in a lettuce leaf along with garlic, hot peppers, rice, and various other vegetables and sauces, then eaten by hand. Variants of the meal include using marinated beef.

== Tourism ==
=== Paroho lake ===
Paroho is an artificial lake measuring 38.9 km^{2} (15.0 sq mi) in area. Built during the Japanese colonial rule in 1944, the hydroelectric power station was constructed by the Japanese in order to support the defense industry for their ongoing invasion of the continent.

=== Peace Dam ===
Peace Dam is correspondence dam completed on October 19, 2005, under construction Geumgangsandaem by North Korea. Total storage capacity, one hundred million tons 26.3, length 601 m, height 125 m is a large dam. There are the Bimokpark and Mulmunhall on the left the entrance. Mulmunhall promote the importance of water resources and has been operating a restaurant and other facilities.

== Symbol Mark ==
The image of the flowing water is derived from Hwacheon's resource, "water," which means high-level welfare through informationization and ideal administrative services. Combining the image of a bird and the shape of water, Hwacheon's Korean initial ㅎ is modeled.

== Sister cities ==
- Seocho-gu, Seoul
- Chatham-Kent, Ontario, Canada
