= Uijeongbu City Hall station =

Metro station in Uijeongbu, South Korea

의정부시청; Uijeongbu City Hall
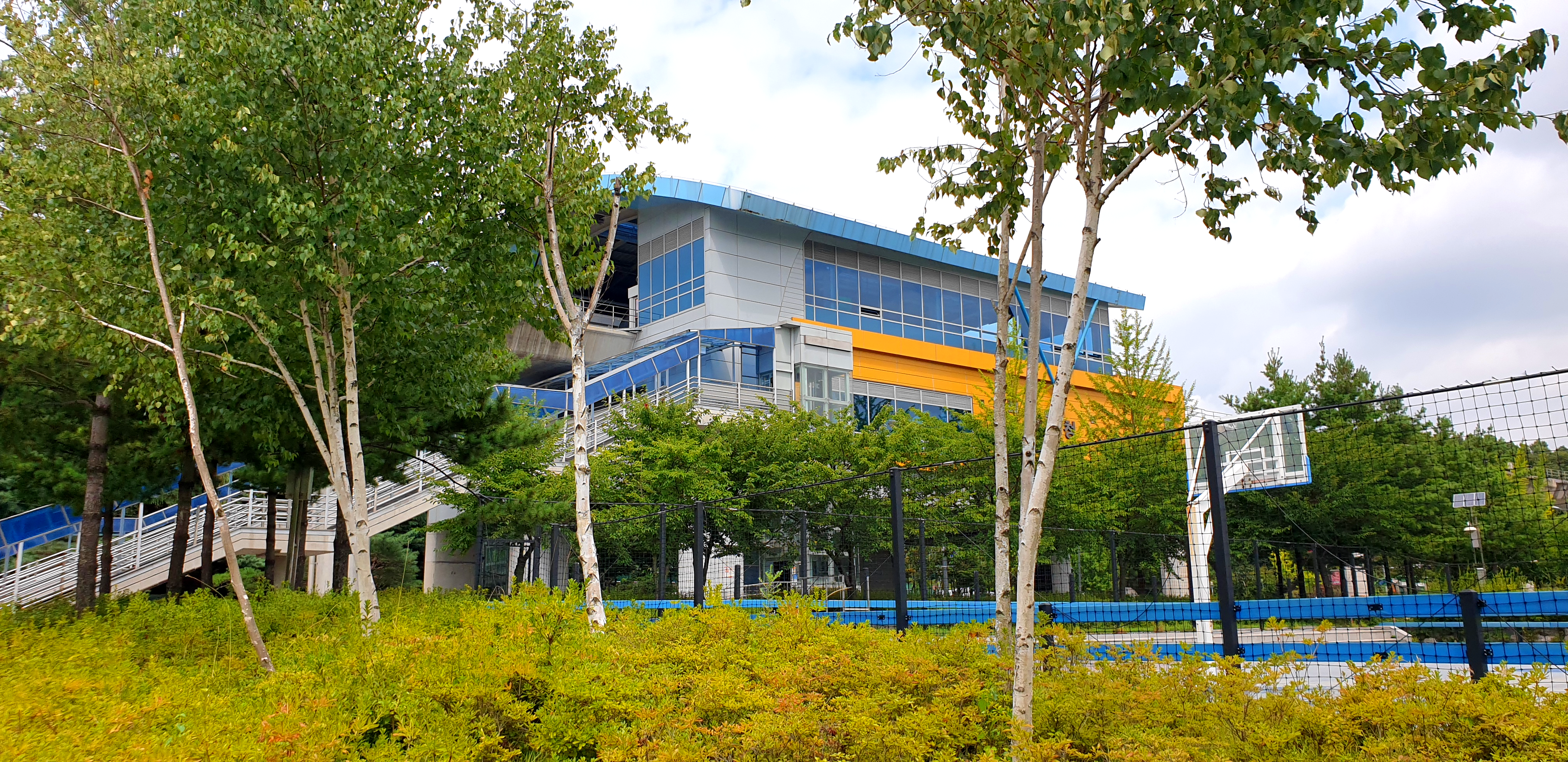

Korean name
- Hangul: 의정부시청역
- Hanja: 議政府市廳驛
- Revised Romanization: Uijeongbu sicheong yeok
- McCune–Reischauer: Ŭijŏngbu sich'ŏng yŏk

General information
- Location: Uijeongbu-dong, Uijeongbu, Gyeonggi-do
- Coordinates: 37.7391°N 127.0348°E
- Operator: Uijeongbu Light Rail Transit Co., Ltd
- Line: U Line
- Platforms: 2
- Tracks: 2

Construction
- Structure type: Aboveground

History
- Opened: July 1, 2012

Services
Preceding station	Seoul Metropolitan Subway	Following station
LRT Uijeongbu towards Balgok	U Line	Heungseon towards Depot Temporary Platform
Location

Uijeongbu City Hall Station (Korean: 의정부시청역; Hanja: 議政府市廳驛) is a station of the U Line in Uijeongbu-dong, Uijeongbu, Gyeonggi-do, South Korea.

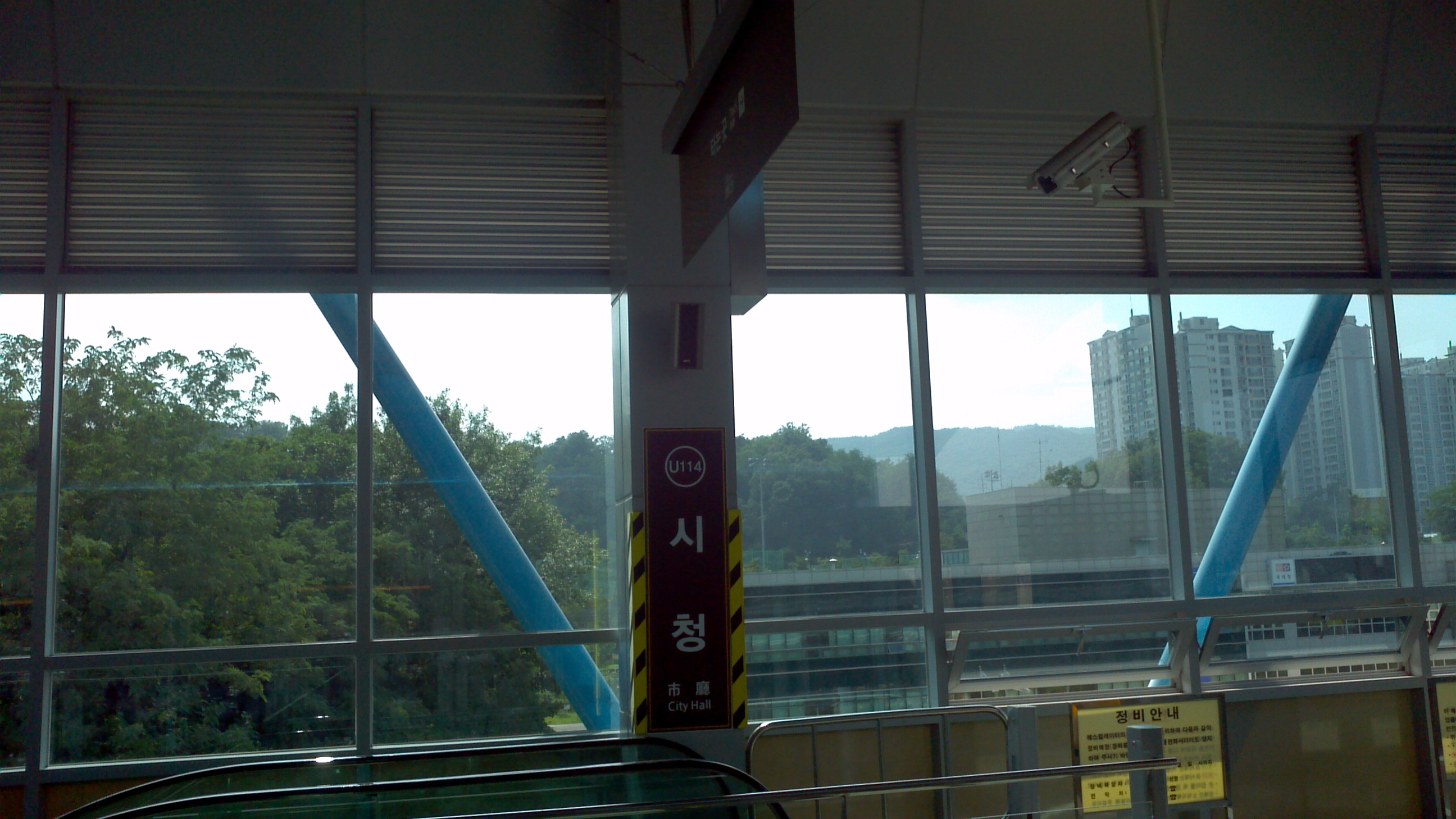

== Station layout ==
L2; Platform level	Side platform, doors will open on the left
L2; Platform level	Westbound	← U Line toward Balgok (LRT Uijeongbu)
L2; Platform level	Eastbound	U Line toward Depot Temporary Platform (Heungseon) →
L2; Platform level	Side platform, doors will open on the left

L1; Concourse	Lobby	Customer Service, Shops, Vending machines, ATMs

G	Street level	Exit
