= Heungseon station =

Metro station in Uijeongbu, South Korea

흥선; Heungseon
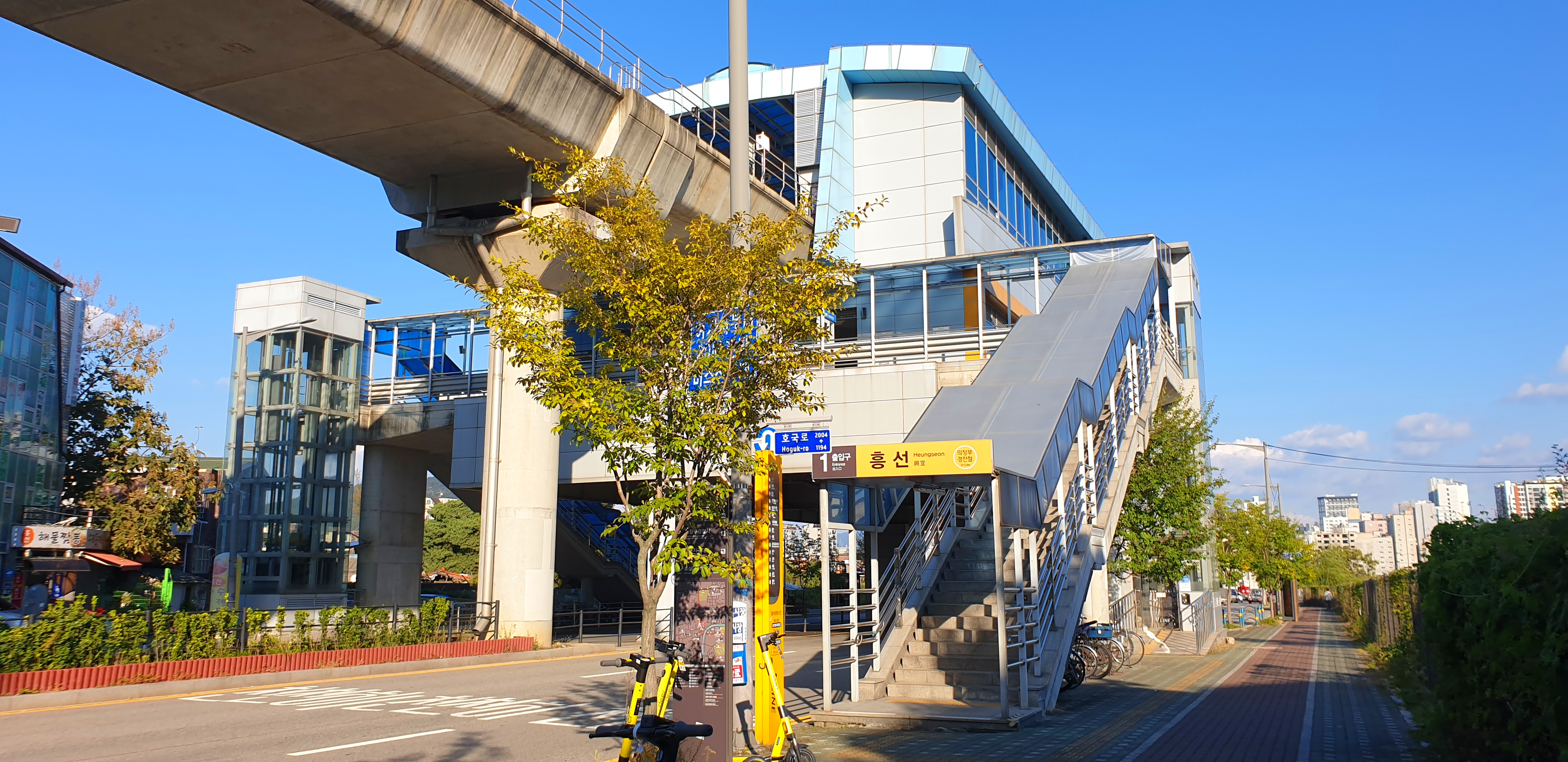
- Station Building

Korean name
- Hangul: 흥선역
- Hanja: 興宣驛
- Revised Romanization: Heungseon yeok
- McCune–Reischauer: Hŭngsŏn yŏk

General information
- Location: Uijeongbu-dong, Uijeongbu, Gyeonggi-do
- Coordinates: 37.7432°N 127.0370°E
- Operator: Uijeongbu Light Rail Transit Co., Ltd
- Line: U Line
- Platforms: 2
- Tracks: 2

Construction
- Structure type: Aboveground
- Cycle facilities: Yes

History
- Opened: July 1, 2012

Services
Preceding station	Seoul Metropolitan Subway	Following station
Uijeongbu City Hall towards Balgok	U Line	Uijeongbu Jung-ang towards Depot Temporary Platform
Location

Heungseon Station (Korean: 흥선역) is a station of the U Line in Uijeongbu-dong, Uijeongbu, Gyeonggi-do, South Korea.

== Station layout ==
L2; Platform level	Side platform, doors will open on the left
L2; Platform level	Westbound	← U Line toward Balgok (Uijeongbu City Hall)
L2; Platform level	Eastbound	U Line toward Depot Temporary Platform (Uijeongbu Jung-ang) →
L2; Platform level	Side platform, doors will open on the left

L1; Concourse	Lobby	Customer Service, Shops, Vending machines, ATMs

G	Street level	Exit

== Gallery ==
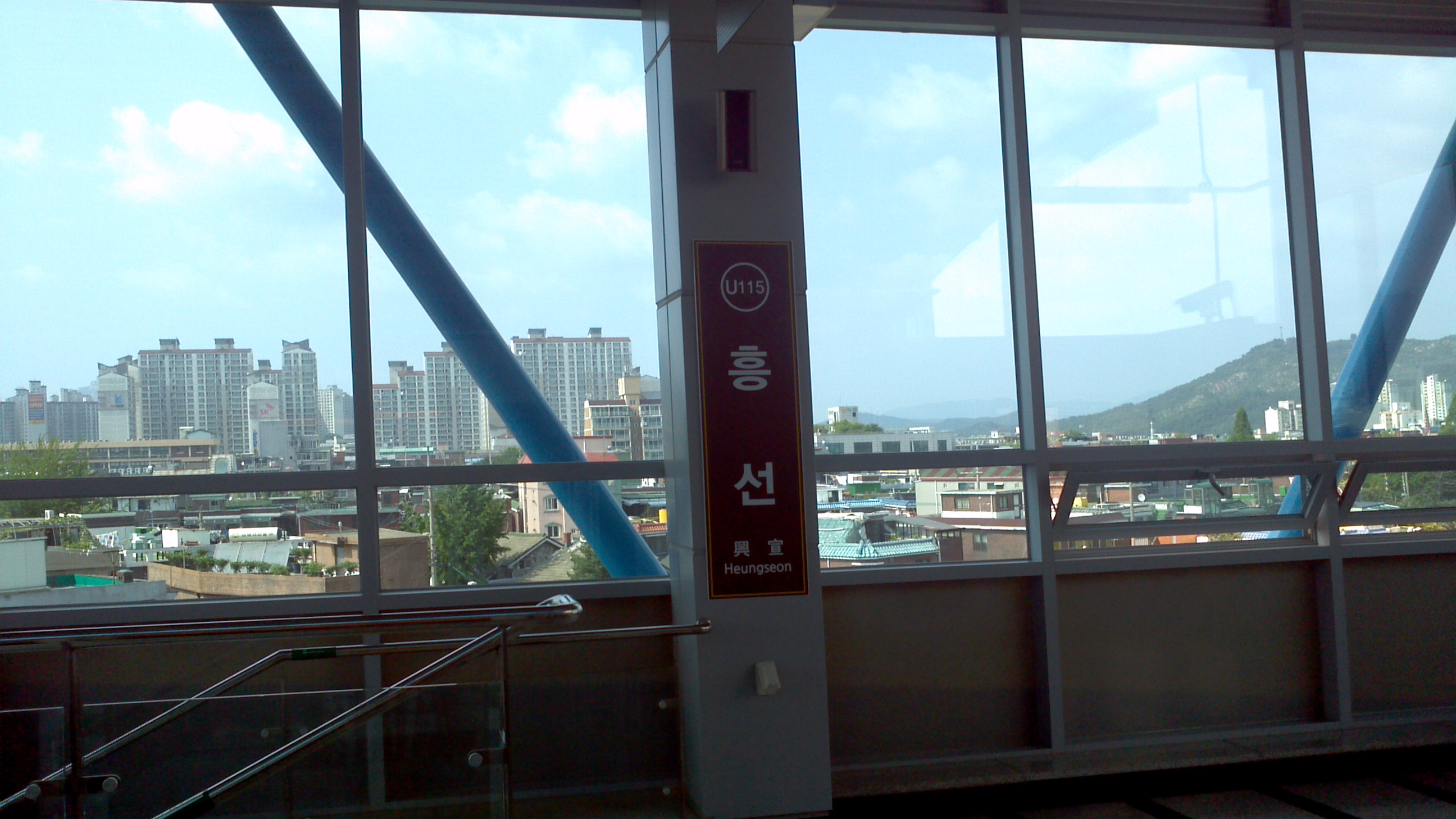
Station Sign
