= Songsan station =

Metro station in Uijeongbu, South Korea

| 송산; Songsan |
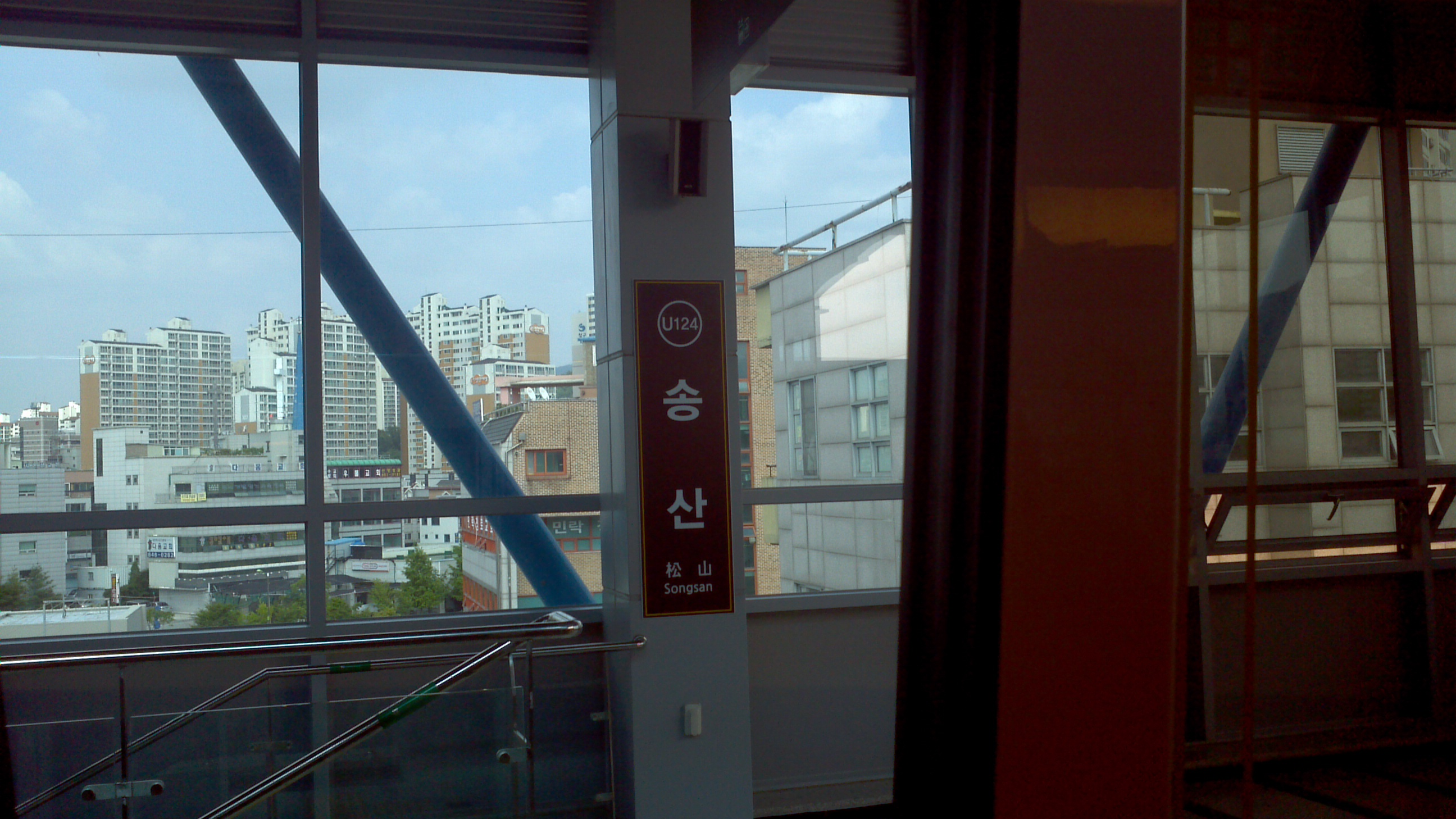

Korean name
- Hangul: 송산역
- Hanja: 松山驛
- Revised Romanization: Songsan yeok
- McCune–Reischauer: Songsan yŏk

General information
- Location: Yonghyeon-dong, Uijeongbu, Gyeonggi-do
- Coordinates: 37.7372°N 127.0872°E
- Operator: Uijeongbu Light Rail Transit Co., Ltd
- Line: U Line
- Platforms: 2
- Tracks: 2

Key dates
- July 1, 2012: U Line opened
Location

Songsan Station (Korean: 송산역; Hanja: 松山驛) is a station of the U Line in Yonghyeon-dong, Uijeongbu, Gyeonggi-do, South Korea.

| Preceding station | Seoul Metropolitan Subway | Following station |
|---|---|---|
| Eoryong towards Balgok | U Line | Tapseok towards Depot Temporary Platform |
