= Tapseok station =

Metro station in Uijeongbu, South Korea

탑석; Tapseok
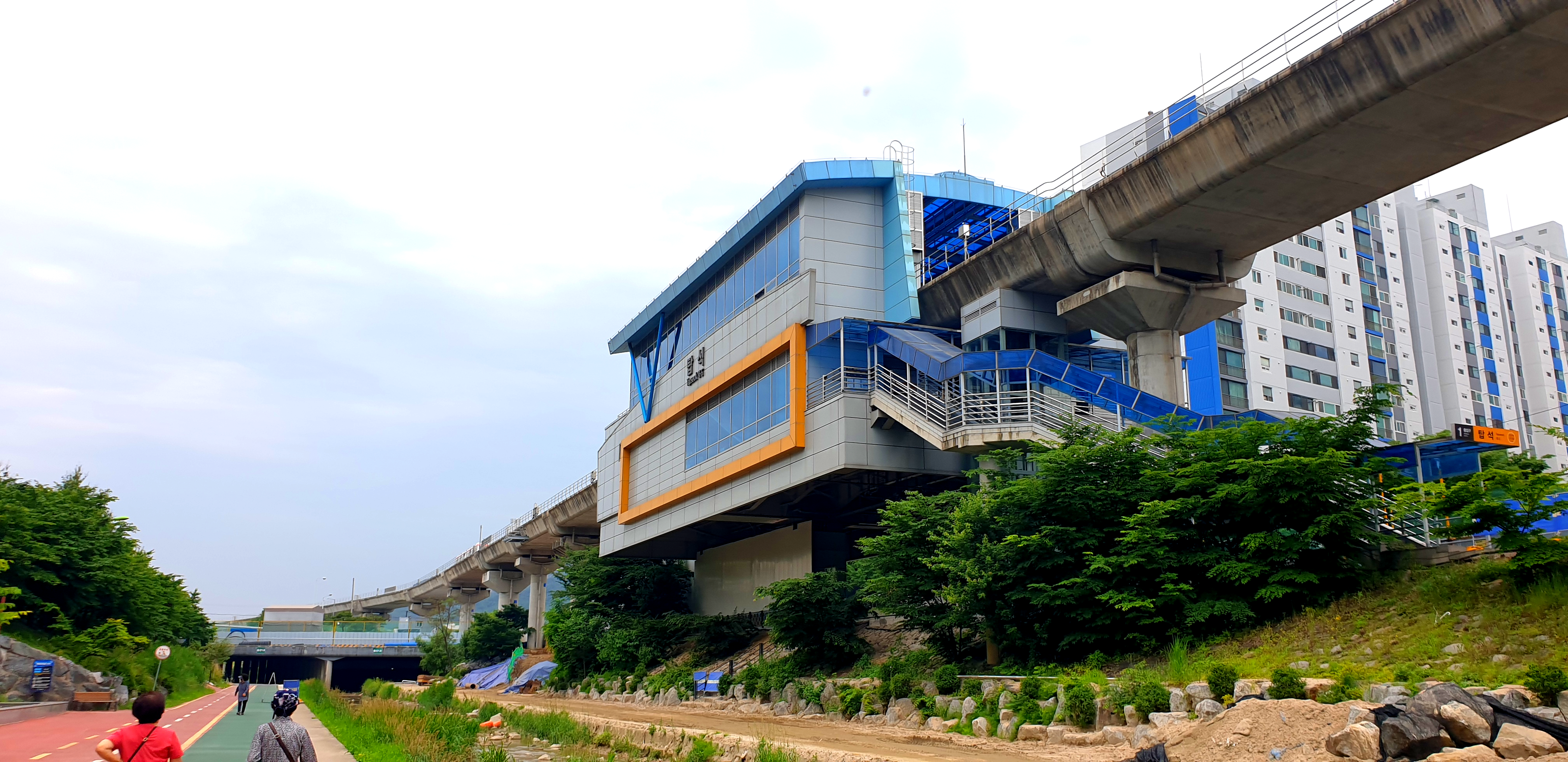

Korean name
- Hangul: 탑석역
- Hanja: 塔石驛
- Revised Romanization: Tabseok yeok
- McCune–Reischauer: T'apsŏk yŏk

General information
- Location: Yonghyeon-dong, Uijeongbu, Gyeonggi-do
- Coordinates: 37.7335°N 127.0889°E
- Operator: Uijeongbu Light Rail Transit Co., Ltd
- Line: U Line
- Platforms: 2
- Tracks: 2

Construction
- Structure type: Aboveground

Key dates
- July 1, 2012: U Line opened
Location

Tapseok Station (Korean: 탑석역; Hanja: 塔石驛) is a station of the U Line in Yonghyeon-dong, Uijeongbu, Gyeonggi-do, South Korea. Line 7 on the Seoul Subway is planned to be extended towards Pocheon, via this station.

== Gallery ==
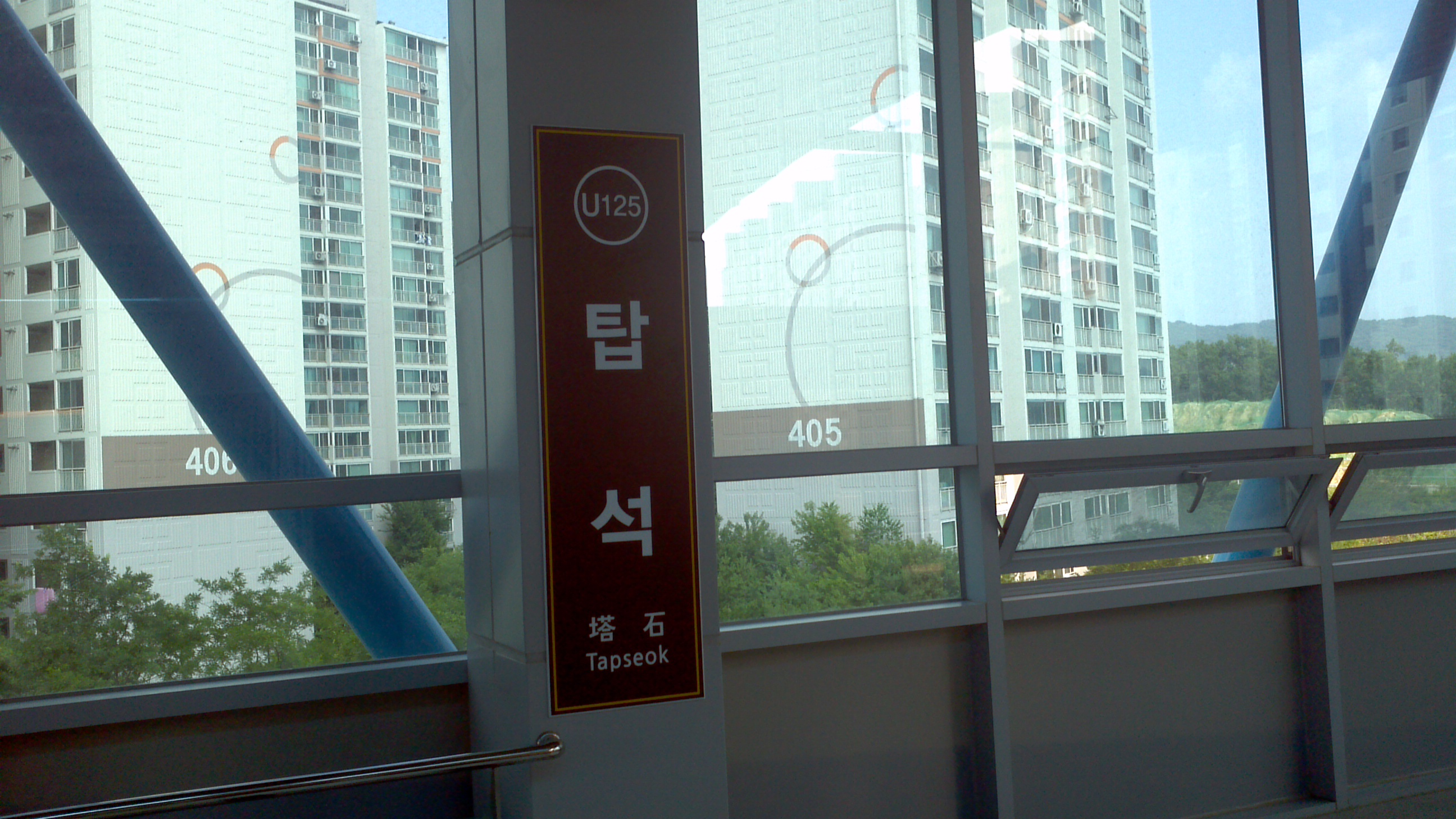
Running in board

Preceding station	Seoul Metropolitan Subway	Following station
Songsan towards Balgok	U Line	Depot Temporary Platform Terminus
