= Gonje station =

Metro station in Uijeongbu, South Korea

곤제; Gonje
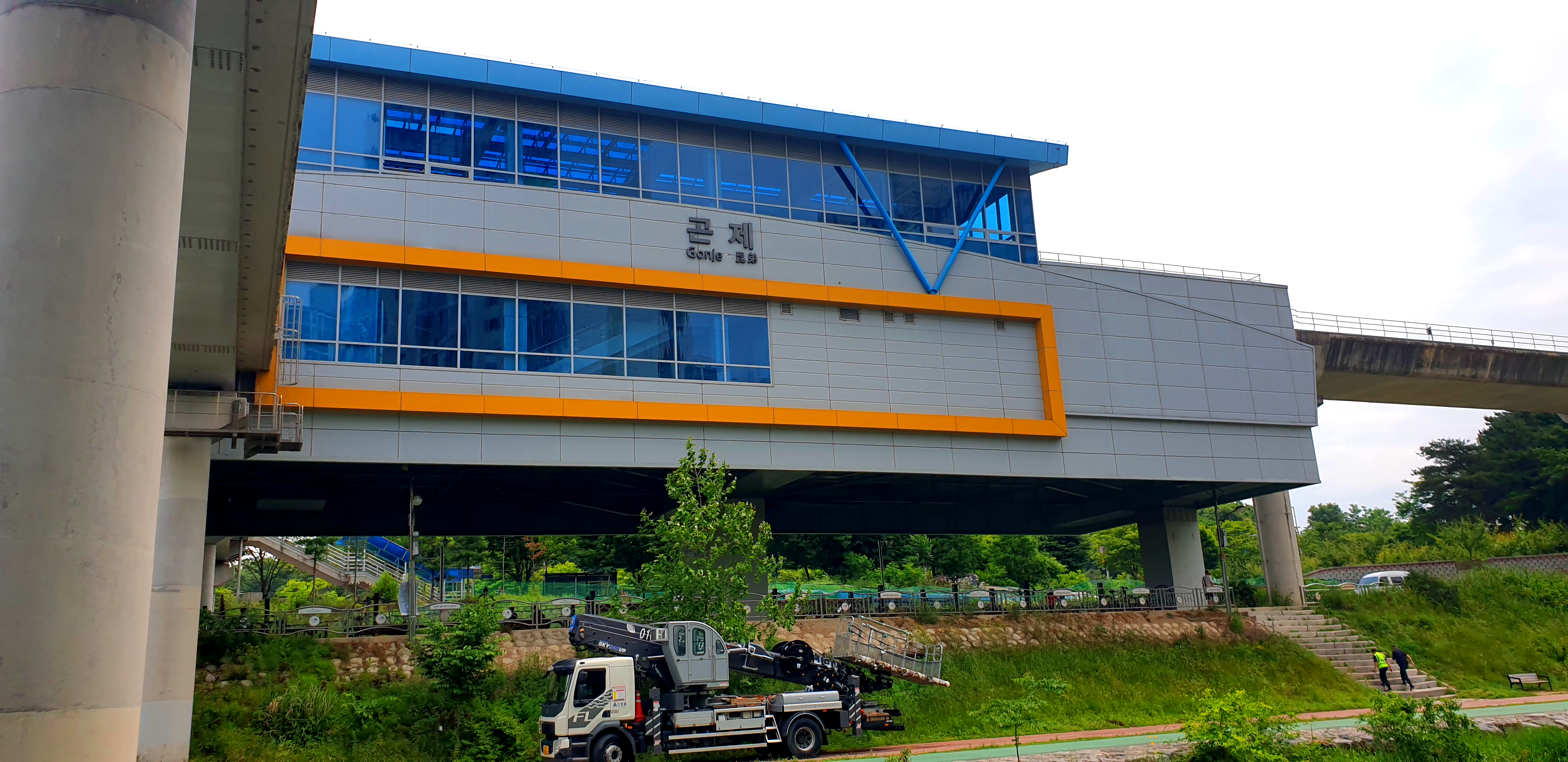

Korean name
- Hangul: 곤제역
- Hanja: 昆弟驛
- Revised Romanization: Gonje-yeok
- McCune–Reischauer: Konche-yŏk

General information
- Location: Geumo-dong, Uijeongbu, Gyeonggi-do
- Coordinates: 37.7505°N 127.0837°E
- Operator: Uijeongbu Light Rail Transit Co., Ltd
- Line: U Line
- Platforms: 2
- Tracks: 2

Key dates
- July 1, 2012: U Line opened
Location

Gonje Station (Korean: 곤제역) is a station of the U Line in Geumo-dong, Uijeongbu, Gyeonggi-do, South Korea.

== Gallery ==
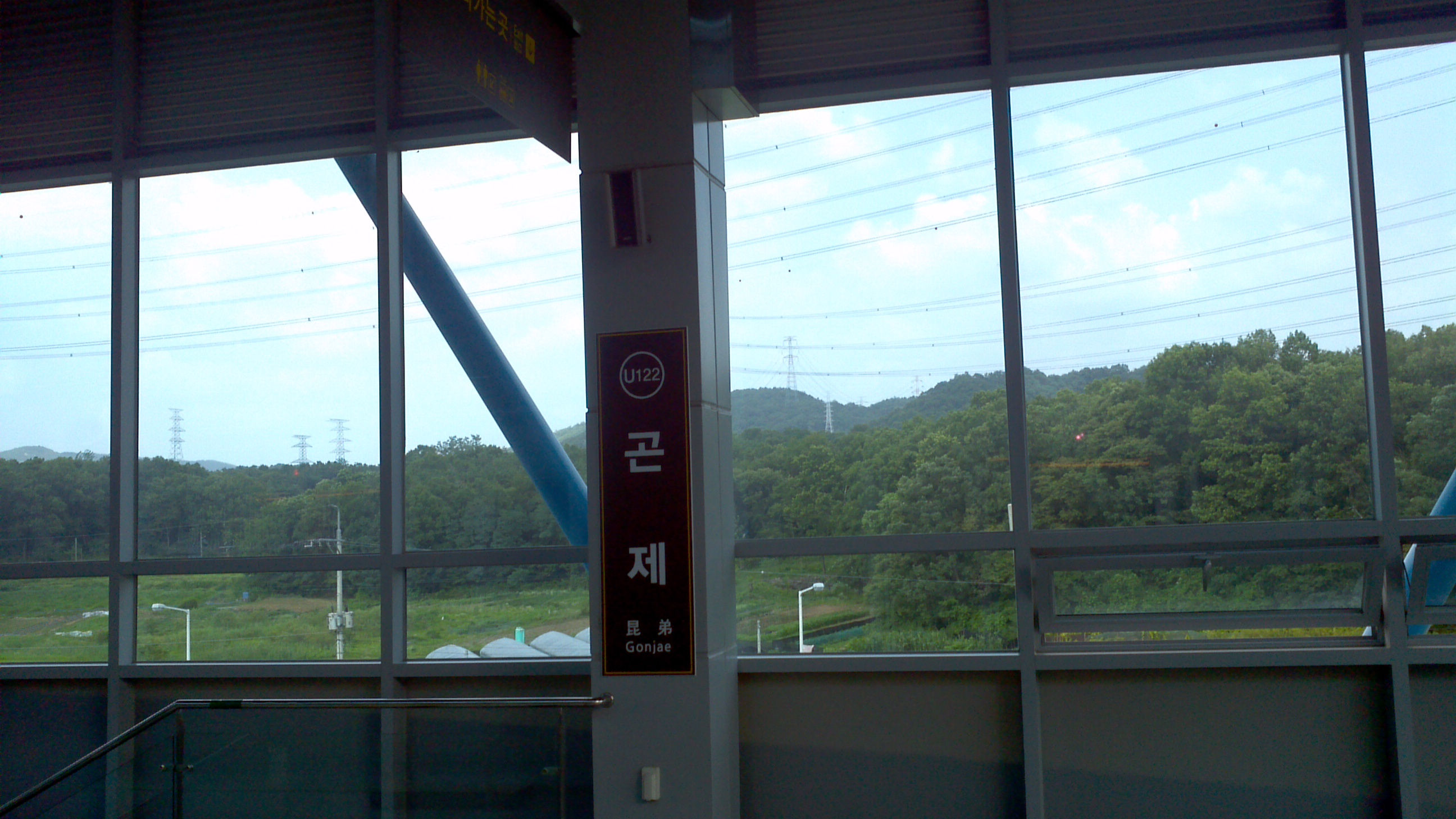
Running in board

Preceding station	Seoul Metropolitan Subway	Following station
Hyoja towards Balgok	U Line	Eoryong towards Depot Temporary Platform
