= Gyeonggi Provincial Government Northern Office station =

Metro station in Uijeongbu, South Korea

Coordinates: 37.7507°N 127.0716°E

| 경기도청북부청사; Gyeonggi Prov Govt North Ofc |
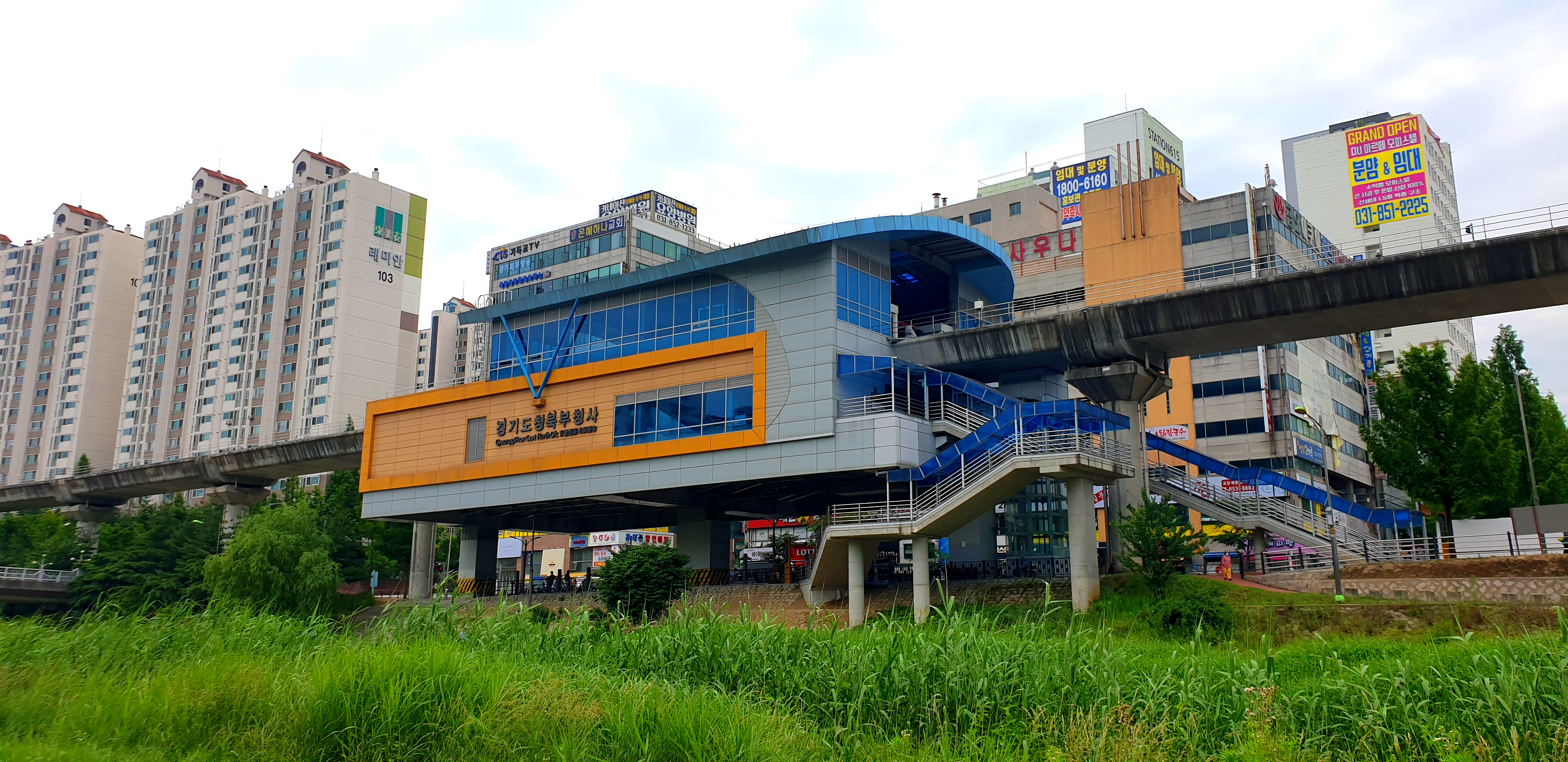

Korean name
- Hangul: 경기도청북부청사역
- Hanja: 京畿道廳北部廳舍驛
- Revised Romanization: Gyeonggi Docheongbukbucheongsa-yeok
- McCune–Reischauer: Kyŏnggi Toch'ŏngbukpuch'ŏngsa-yŏk

General information
- Location: Shingok-dong, Uijeongbu, Gyeonggi-do
- Operator: Uijeongbu Light Rail Transit Co., Ltd
- Line: U Line
- Platforms: 2
- Tracks: 2

Key dates
- July 1, 2012: U Line opened
Location

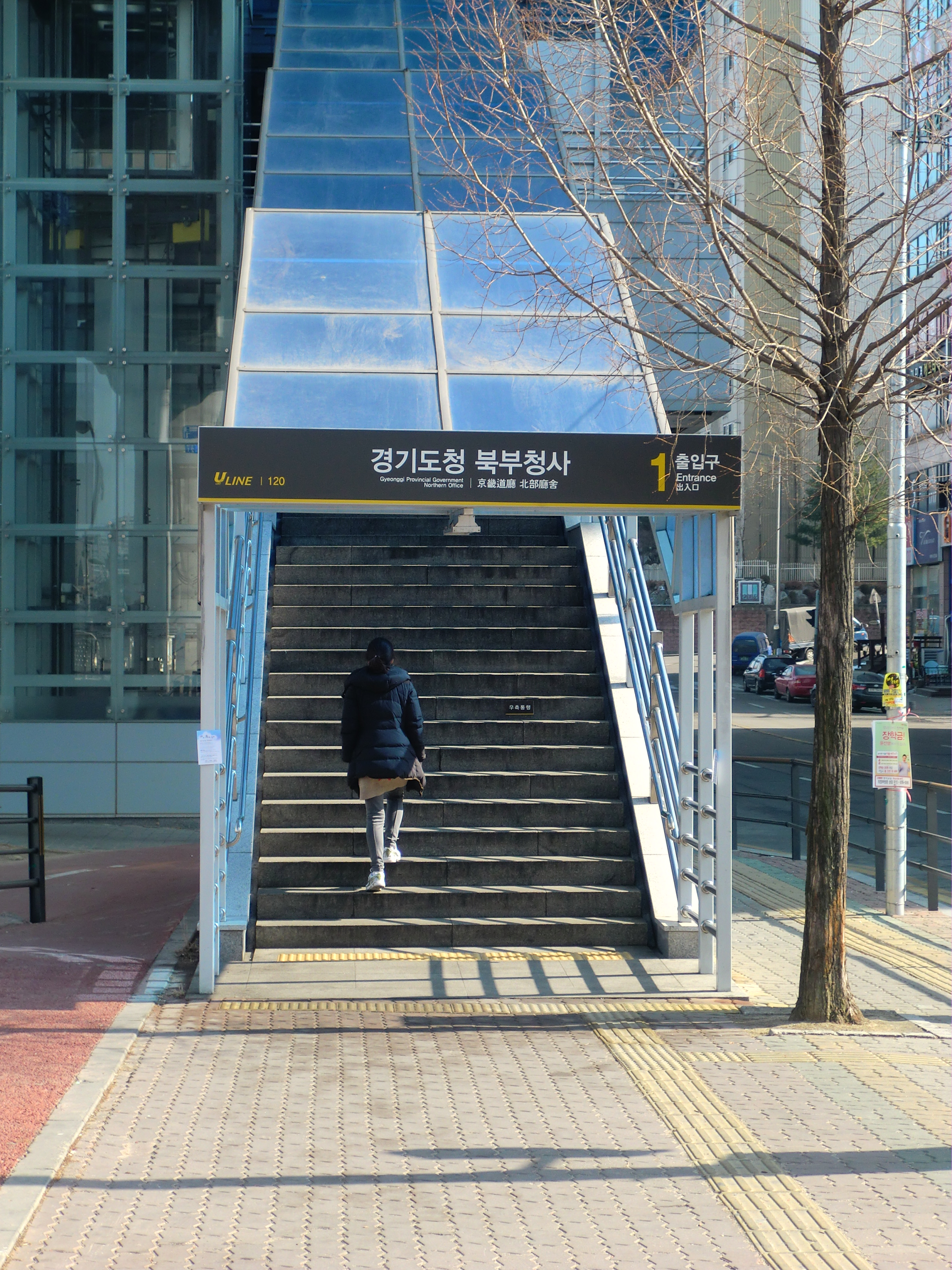
No.1 entrance with full name of this station "Gyeonggi Provincial Government Northern Office"

Gyeonggi Provincial Government Northern Office (Korean: 경기도청북부청사) is a station on the U Line in Shingok-dong, Uijeongbu, Gyeonggi-do, South Korea.

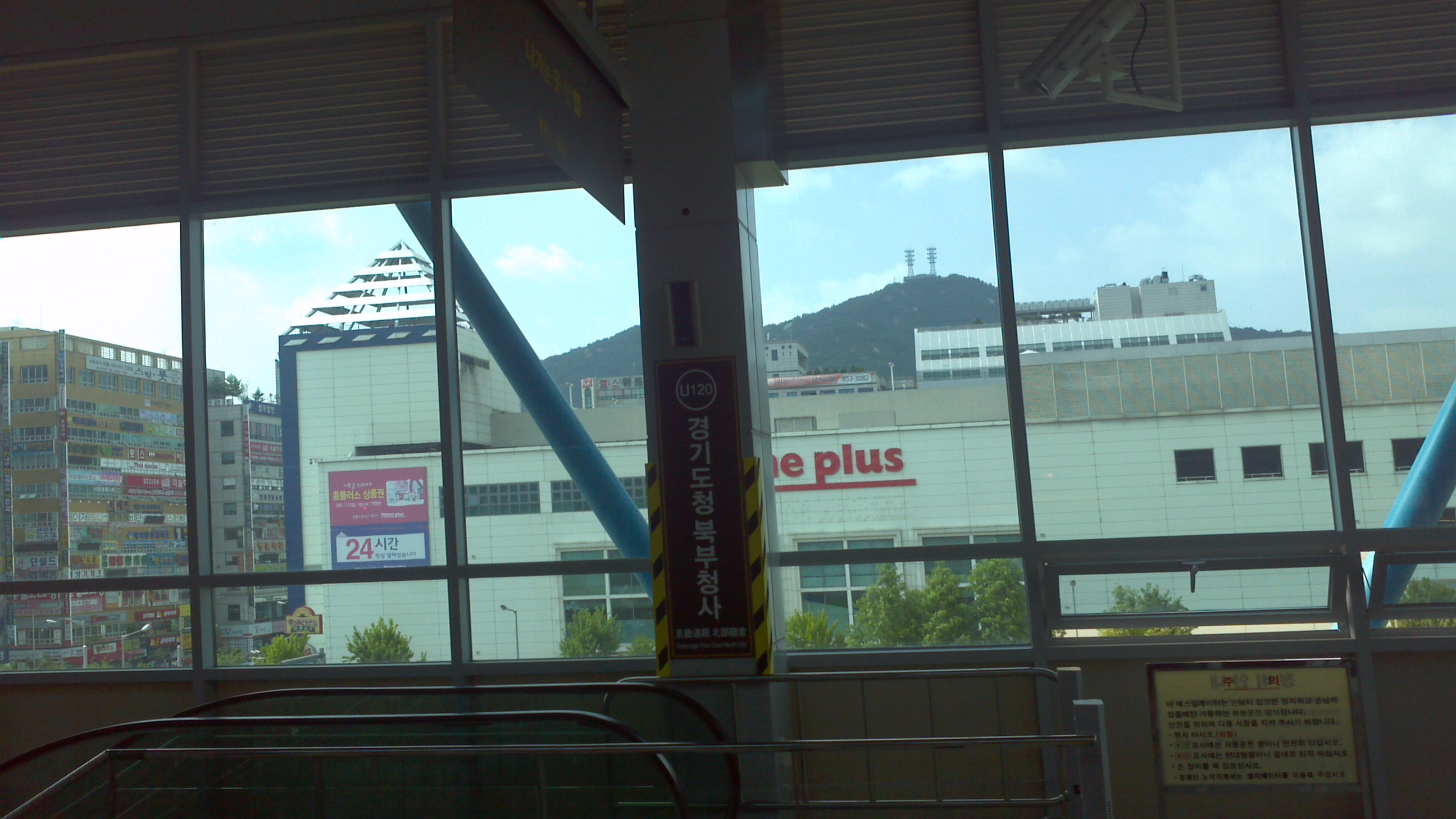

| Preceding station | Seoul Metropolitan Subway | Following station |
|---|---|---|
| Sae-mal towards Balgok | U Line | Hyoja towards Depot Temporary Platform |
