= Dong-o station =

Metro station in Uijeongbu, South Korea

동오; Dong-o
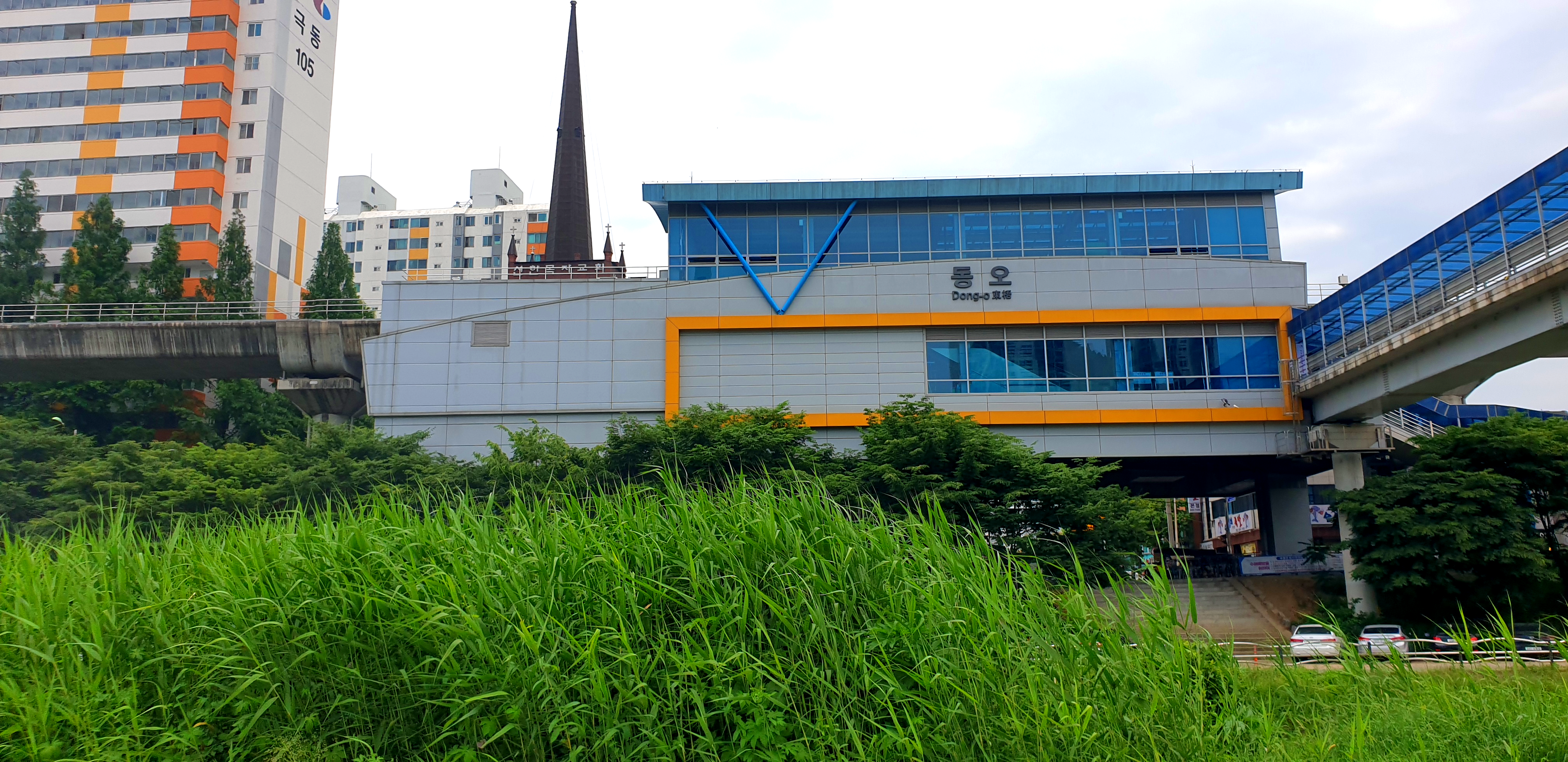

Korean name
- Hangul: 동오역
- Hanja: 東梧驛
- Revised Romanization: Dongo-yeok
- McCune–Reischauer: Tongo-yŏk

General information
- Location: Shingok-dong, Uijeongbu, Gyeonggi-do
- Coordinates: 37.7452°N 127.0569°E
- Operator: Uijeongbu Light Rail Transit Co., Ltd
- Line: U Line
- Platforms: 2
- Tracks: 2

Key dates
- July 1, 2012: U Line opened
Location

Dong-o station (Korean: 동오역) is a station on the U Line in the Shingok neighborhood of Uijeongbu, Gyeonggi Province, South Korea.

== Gallery ==
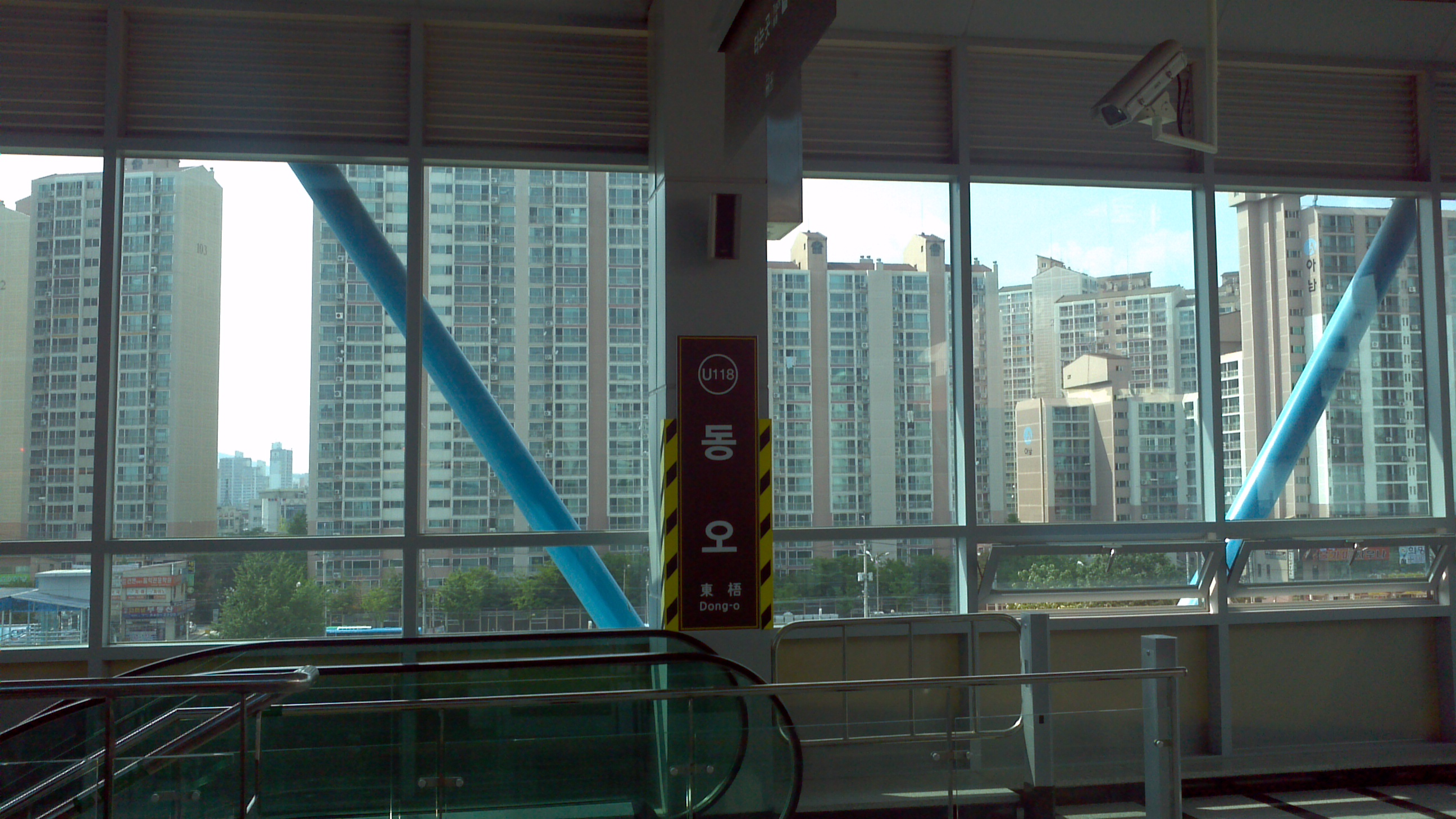
Running in board

Preceding station	Seoul Metropolitan Subway	Following station
Uijeongbu Jung-ang towards Balgok	U Line	Sae-mal towards Depot Temporary Platform
