= Beomgol station =

Metro station in Uijeongbu, South Korea

| 범골; Beomgol |
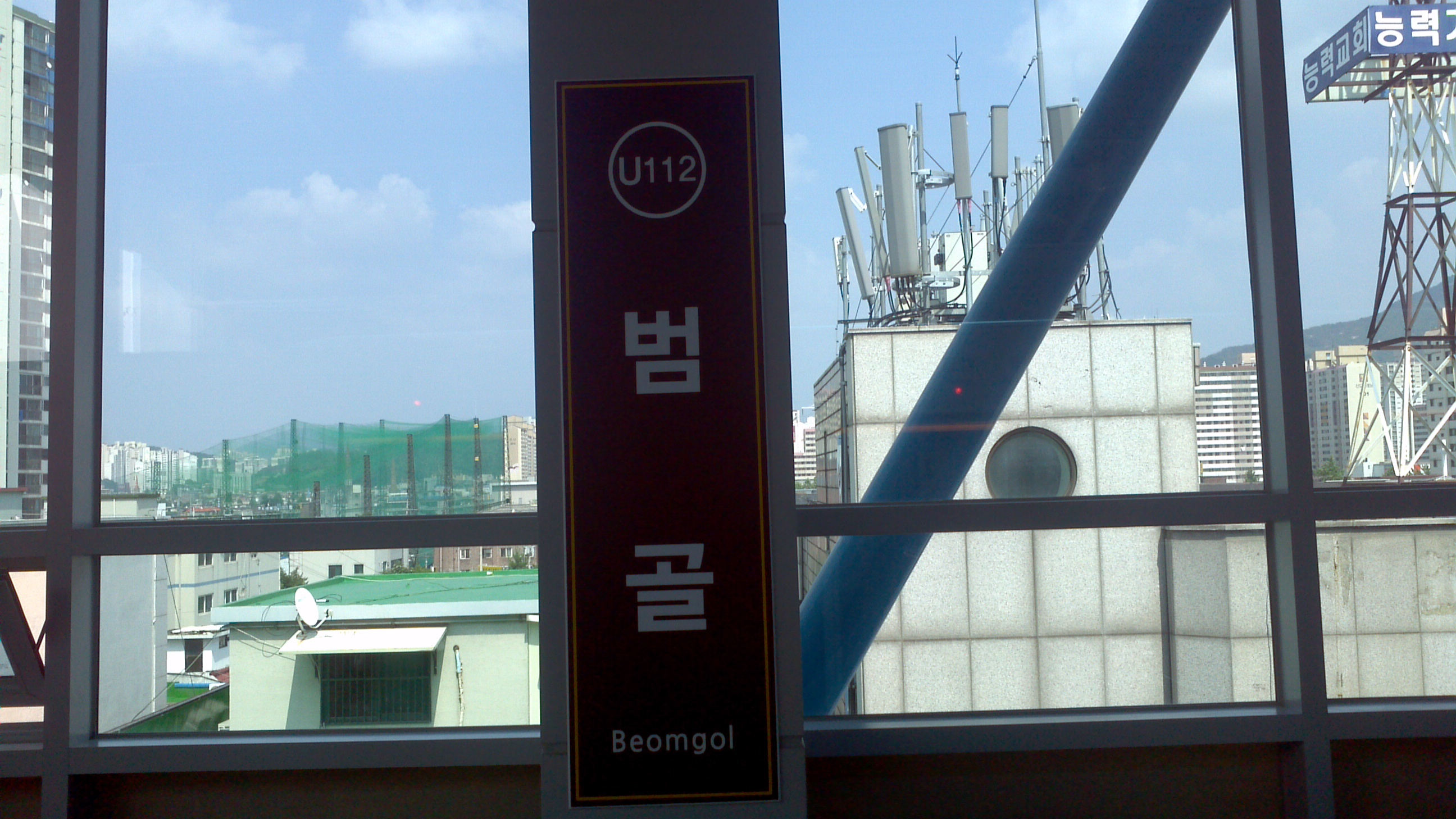

Korean name
- Hangul: 범골역
- Revised Romanization: Beomgol-yeok
- McCune–Reischauer: Pŏmgol-yŏk

General information
- Location: Shingok-dong, Uijeongbu, Gyeonggi-do
- Coordinates: 37.7287°N 127.0436°E
- Operator: Uijeongbu Light Rail Transit Co., Ltd
- Line: U Line
- Platforms: 2
- Tracks: 2

Construction
- Structure type: Aboveground

History
- Opened: July 1, 2012

Services
| Preceding station | Seoul Metropolitan Subway | Following station |
|---|---|---|
| Hoeryong towards Balgok | U Line | LRT Uijeongbu towards Depot Temporary Platform |
Location

Beomgol Station (Korean: 범골역) is a station of the U Line in Shingok-dong, Uijeongbu, Gyeonggi Province, South Korea.

== Station layout ==
| L2; Platform level | Side platform, doors will open on the right |
| L2; Platform level | Westbound | ← U Line toward Balgok (Hoeryong) |
| L2; Platform level | Eastbound | U Line toward Depot Temporary Platform (LRT Uijeongbu) → |
| L2; Platform level | Side platform, doors will open on the right |

| L1; Concourse | Lobby | Customer Service, Shops, Vending machines, ATMs |

| G | Street level | Exit |
