= LRT Uijeongbu station =

Metro station in Uijeongbu, South Korea

경전철의정부; LRT Uijeongbu
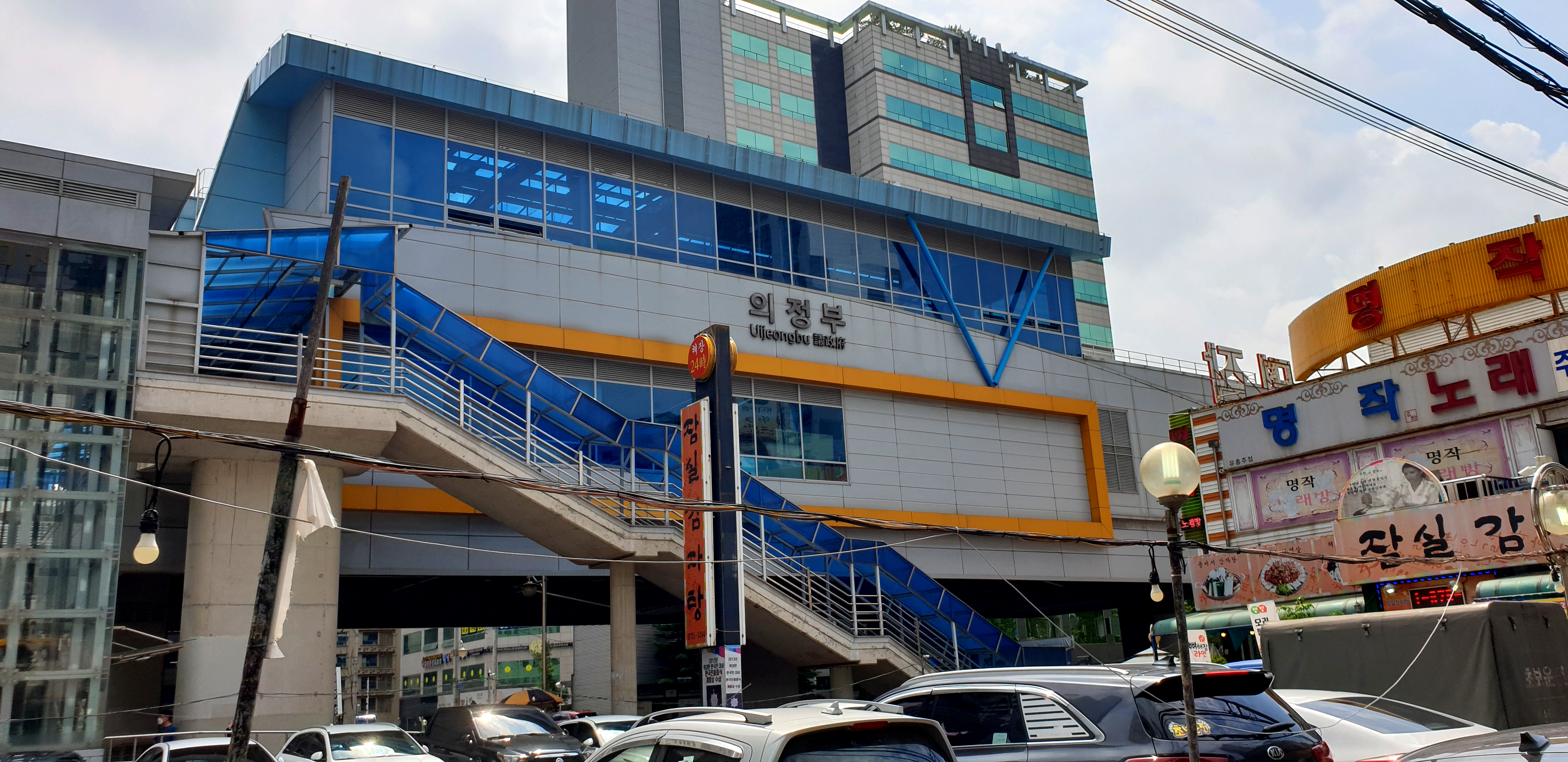

Korean name
- Hangul: 경전철의정부역
- Hanja: 輕電鐵議政府驛
- Revised Romanization: Gyeongjeoncheol Uijeongbu yeok
- McCune–Reischauer: Kyŏngjŏnch'ŏl Ŭijŏngbu yŏk

General information
- Location: Uijeongbu-dong, Uijeongbu, Gyeonggi-do
- Coordinates: 37.7373°N 127.0433°E
- Operator: Uijeongbu Light Rail Transit Co., Ltd
- Line: U Line
- Platforms: 2
- Tracks: 2

Construction
- Structure type: Aboveground

History
- Opened: July 1, 2012

Services
Preceding station	Seoul Metropolitan Subway	Following station
Beomgol towards Balgok	U Line	Uijeongbu City Hall towards Depot Temporary Platform
Location

LRT Uijeongbu station (Korean: 경전철의정부역; Hanja: 輕電鐵議政府驛) is a station of the U Line in Uijeongbu-dong, Uijeongbu, Gyeonggi-do, South Korea. The station is unrelated to the Uijeongbu station of Korail.

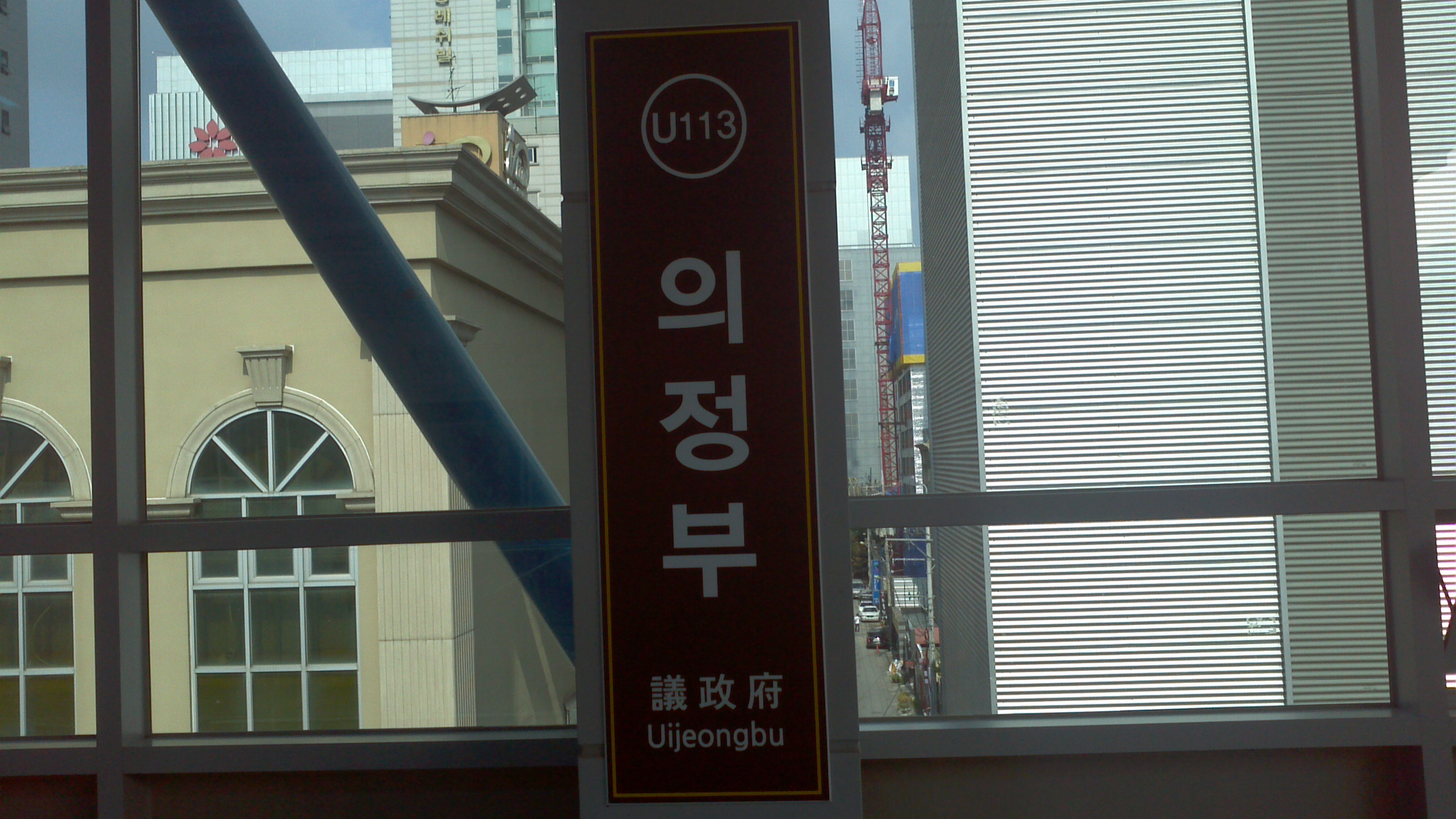

== Station layout ==
L2; Platform level	Side platform, doors will open on the right
L2; Platform level	Westbound	← U Line toward Balgok (Beomgol)
L2; Platform level	Eastbound	U Line toward Depot Temporary Platform (Uijeongbu City Hall) →
L2; Platform level	Side platform, doors will open on the right

L1; Concourse	Lobby	Customer Service, Shops, Vending machines, ATMs

G	Street level	Exit
