= Eoryong station =

Metro station in Uijeongbu, South Korea

어룡 (용현산업단지); Eoryong (Yonghyeon Industrial Complex)
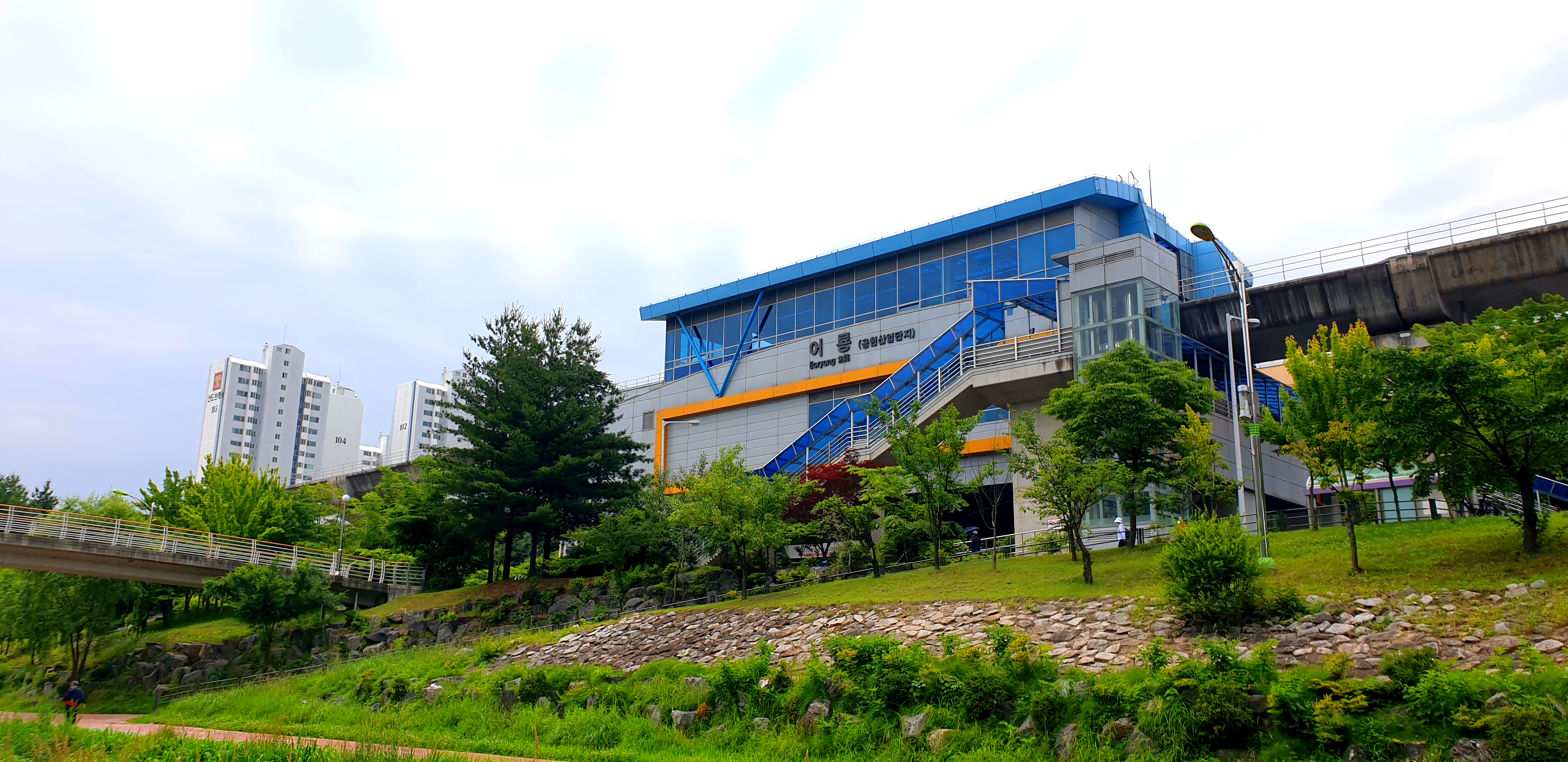

Korean name
- Hangul: 어룡역
- Hanja: 魚龍驛
- Revised Romanization: Eoryong-yeok
- McCune–Reischauer: Ŏryong-yŏk

General information
- Location: Yonghyeon-dong, Uijeongbu, Gyeonggi-do
- Coordinates: 37.7427°N 127.0852°E
- Operator: Uijeongbu Light Rail Transit Co., Ltd
- Line: U Line
- Platforms: 2
- Tracks: 2

Key dates
- July 1, 2012: U Line opened
Location

Eoryong station (Korean: 어룡역) is a light rail station on the U Line in the Yonghyeon neighborhood of Uijeongbu, Gyeonggi Province.

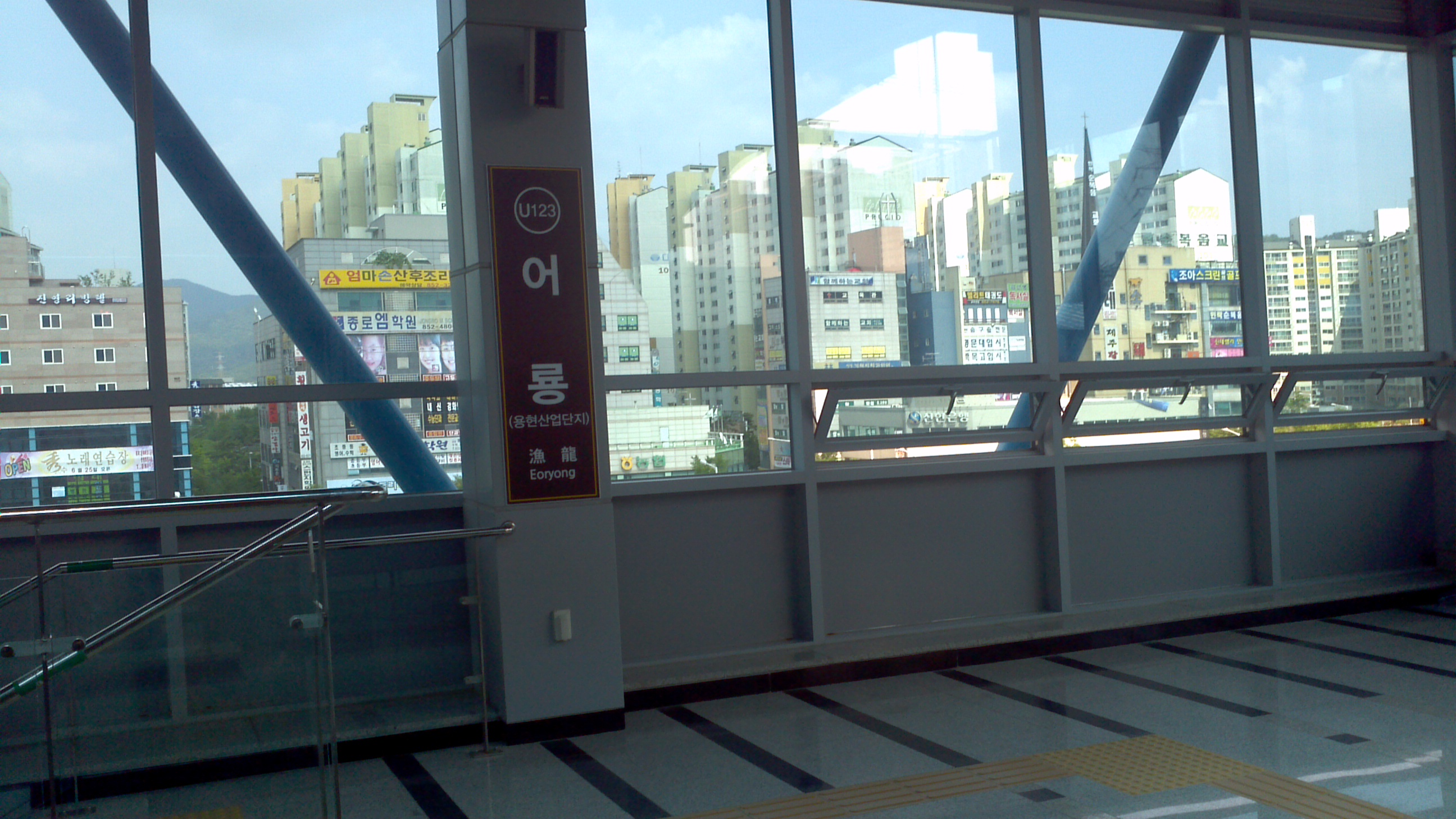

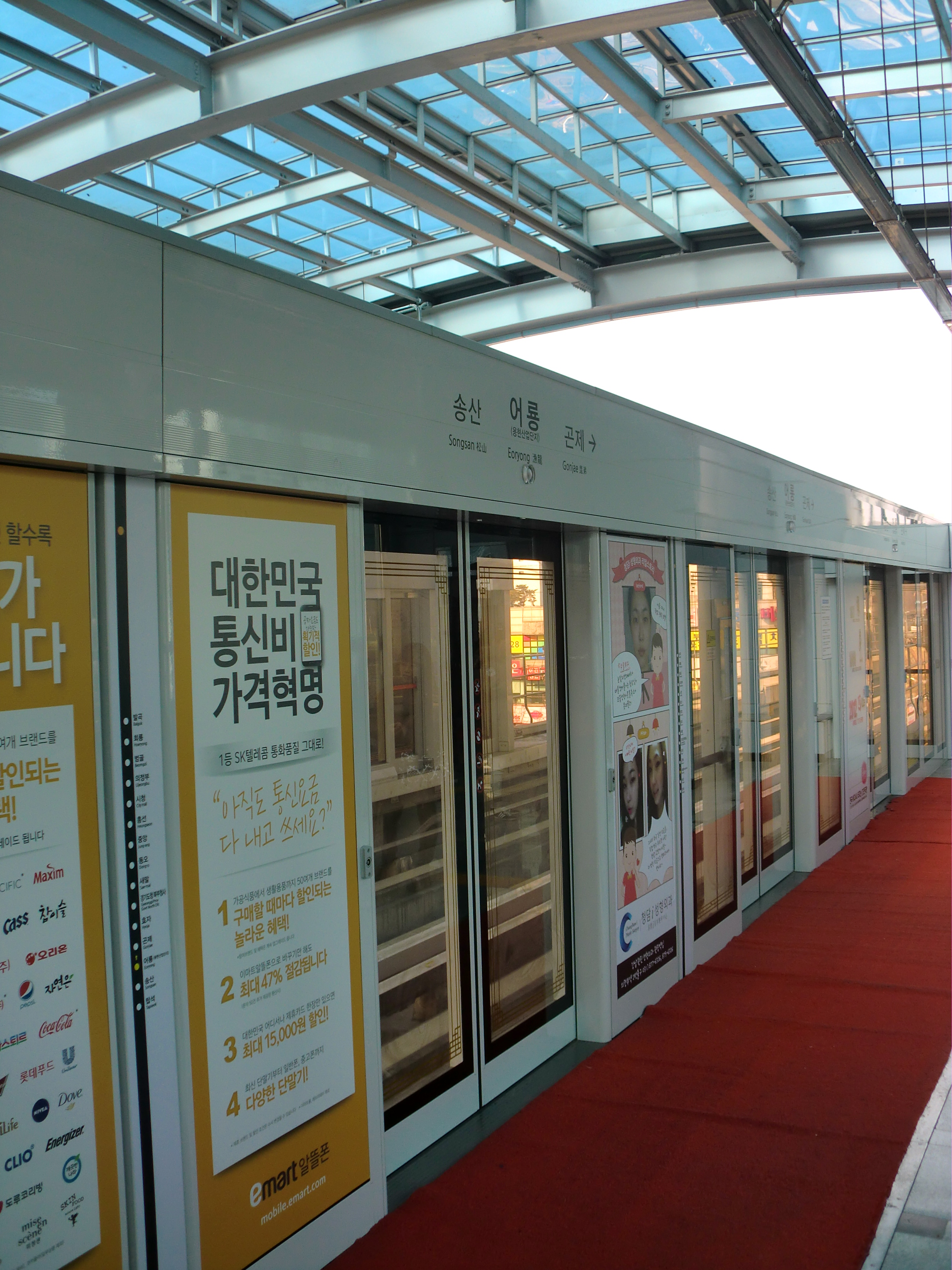

Preceding station	Seoul Metropolitan Subway	Following station
Gonje towards Balgok	U Line	Songsan towards Depot Temporary Platform
