= Uijeongbu Jung-ang station =

Metro station in Uijeongbu, South Korea

| 의정부중앙; Uijeongbu Jung-ang |
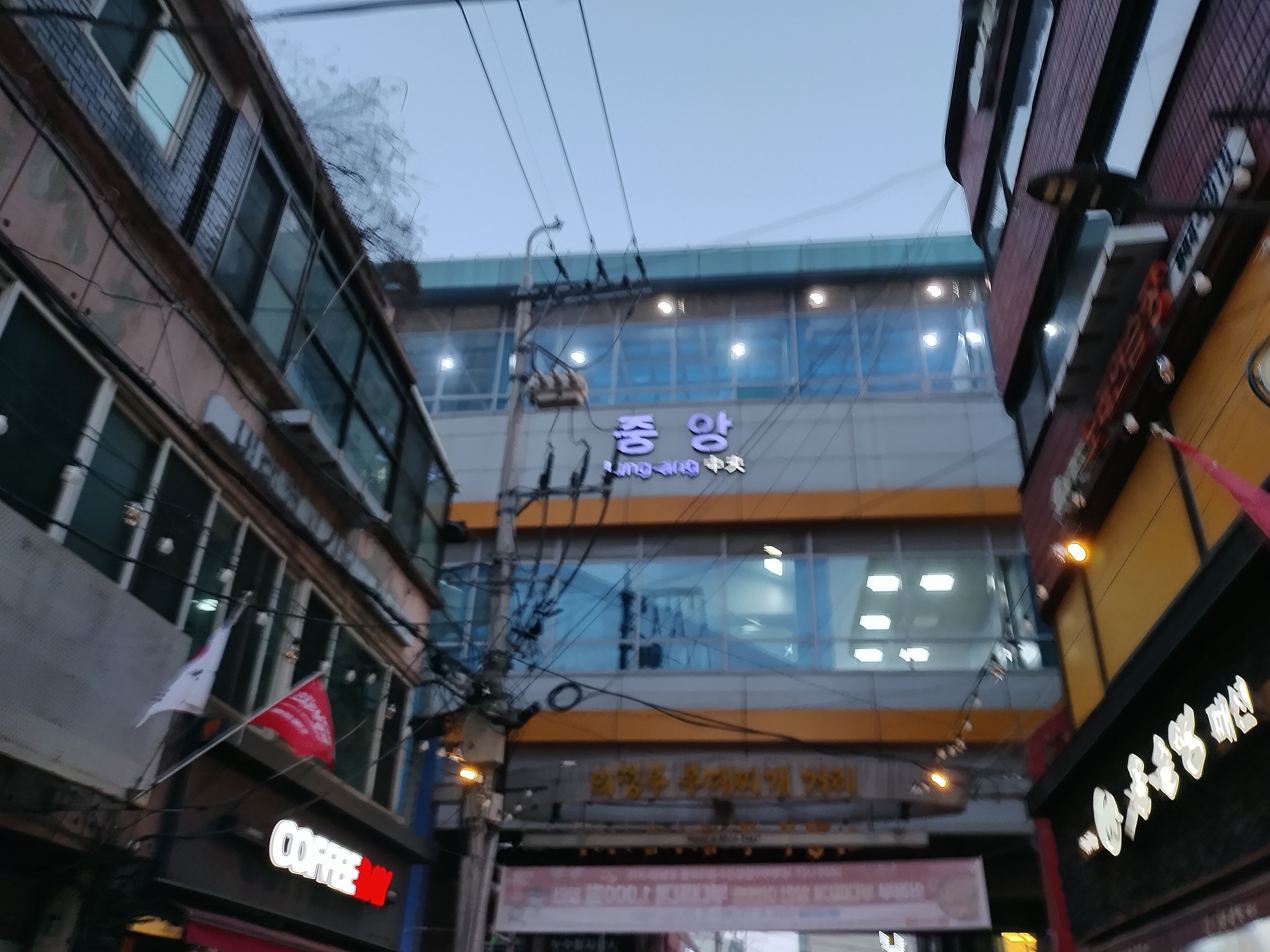

Korean name
- Hangul: 의정부중앙역
- Hanja: 議政府中央驛
- Revised Romanization: Uijeongbu jungang yeok
- McCune–Reischauer: Ŭijŏngbu chungang yŏk

General information
- Location: Uijeongbu-dong, Uijeongbu, Gyeonggi-do
- Coordinates: 37.7436°N 127.0496°E
- Operator: Uijeongbu Light Rail Transit Co., Ltd
- Line: U Line
- Platforms: 2
- Tracks: 2

Construction
- Structure type: Aboveground
- Cycle facilities: Yes

History
- Opened: July 1, 2012

Services
| Preceding station | Seoul Metropolitan Subway | Following station |
|---|---|---|
| Heungseon towards Balgok | U Line | Dong-o towards Depot Temporary Platform |
Location

Uijeongbu Jung-ang station (Korean: 의정부중앙역; Hanja: 議政府中央驛) is a station of the U Line in Uijeongbu-dong, Uijeongbu, Gyeonggi-do, South Korea.

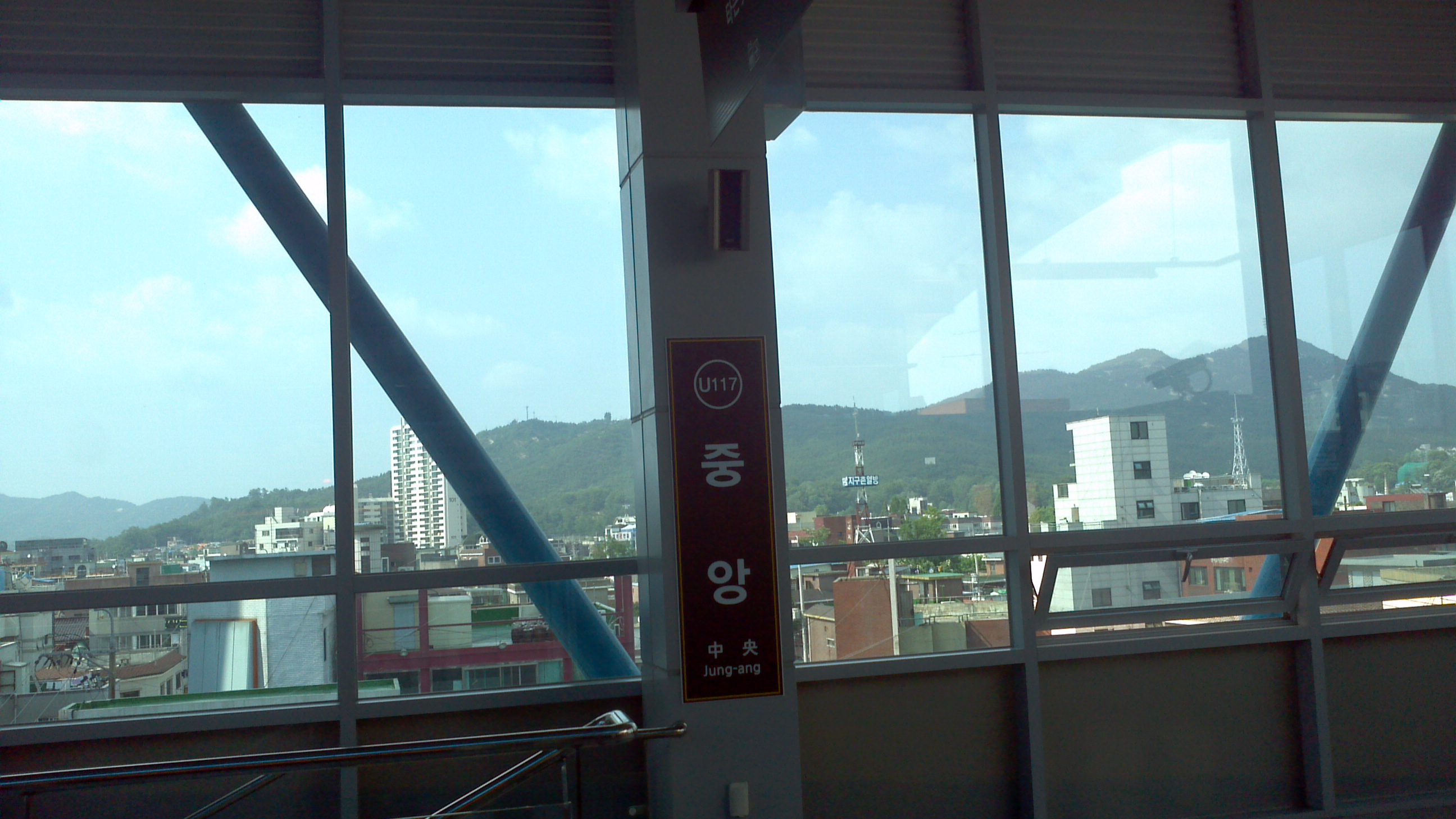

== Station layout ==
| L2; Platform level | Side platform, doors will open on the left |
| L2; Platform level | Westbound | ← U Line toward Balgok (Heungseon) |
| L2; Platform level | Eastbound | U Line toward Depot Temporary Platform (Dong-o) → |
| L2; Platform level | Side platform, doors will open on the left |

| L1; Concourse | Lobby | Customer Service, Shops, Vending machines, ATMs |

| G | Street level | Exit |

== Vicinity ==
- Exit 1: Uijeongbu Bubudae Jjigae Street
- Exit 2: Bicycle facilities
