= Sae-mal station =

Metro station in Uijeongbu, South Korea

새말; Sae-mal
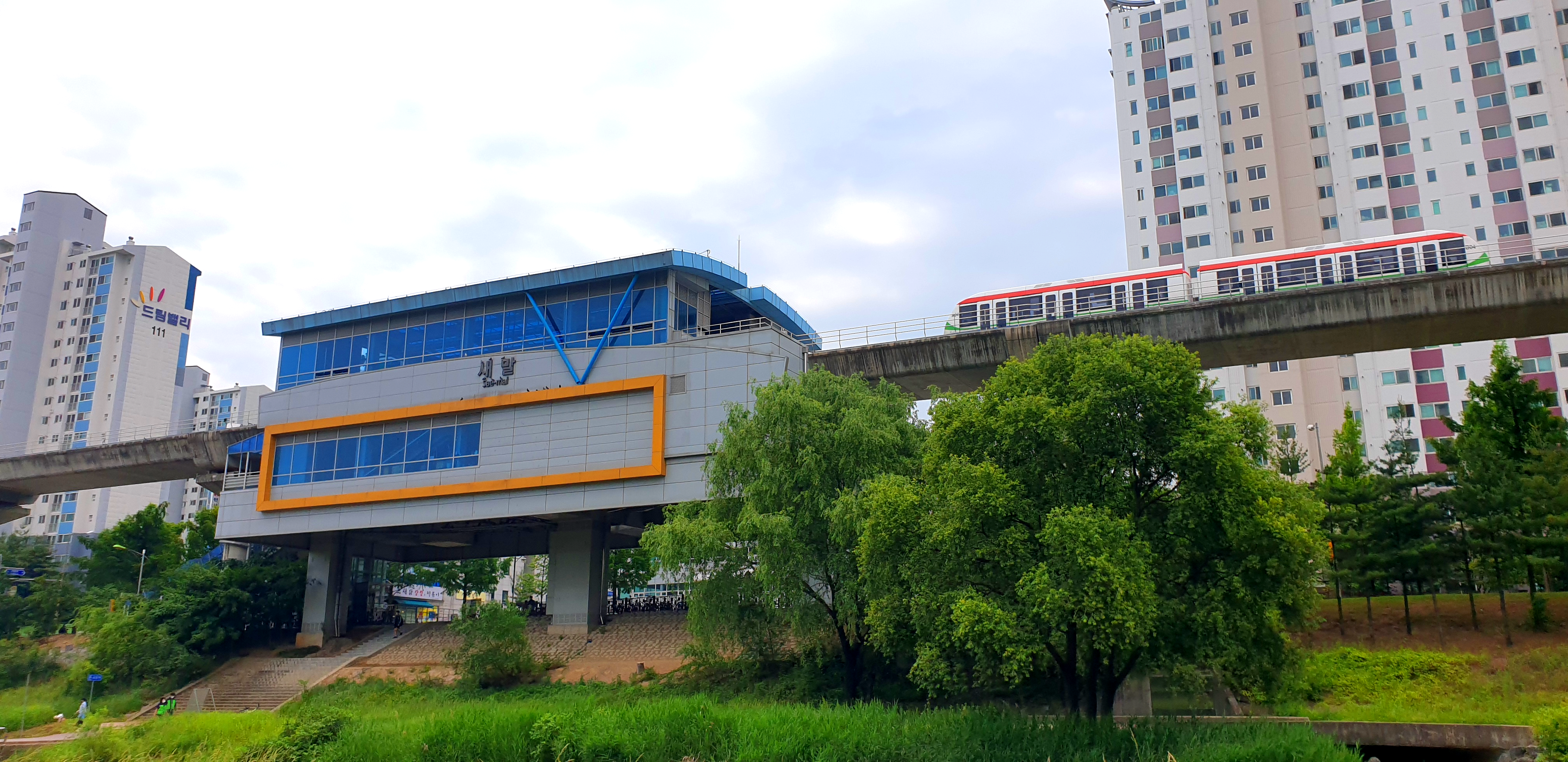

Korean name
- Hangul: 새말역
- Revised Romanization: Saemal yeok
- McCune–Reischauer: Saemal yŏk

General information
- Location: Shingok-dong, Uijeongbu, Gyeonggi-do
- Coordinates: 37.7488°N 127.0637°E
- Operator: Uijeongbu Light Rail Transit Co., Ltd
- Line: U Line
- Platforms: 2
- Tracks: 2

Key dates
- July 1, 2012: U Line opened
Location

Sae-mal Station (Korean: 새말역) is a station of the U Line in Shingok-dong, Uijeongbu, Gyeonggi-do, South Korea.

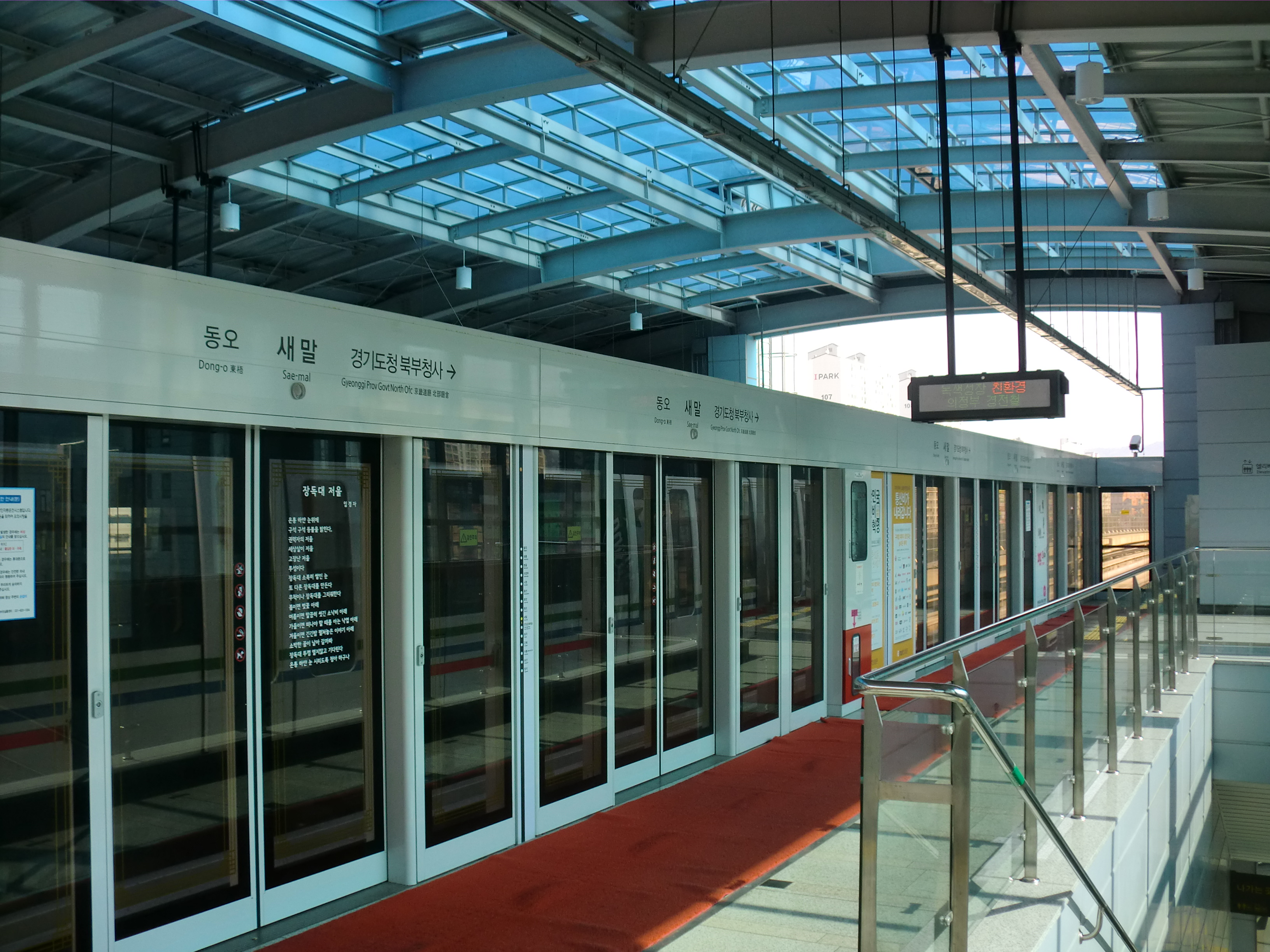
The platform

Preceding station	Seoul Metropolitan Subway	Following station
Dong-o towards Balgok	U Line	Gyeonggi Provincial Government Northern Office towards Depot Temporary Platform
