= Hyoja station =

Metro station in Uijeongbu, South Korea

효자; Hyoja
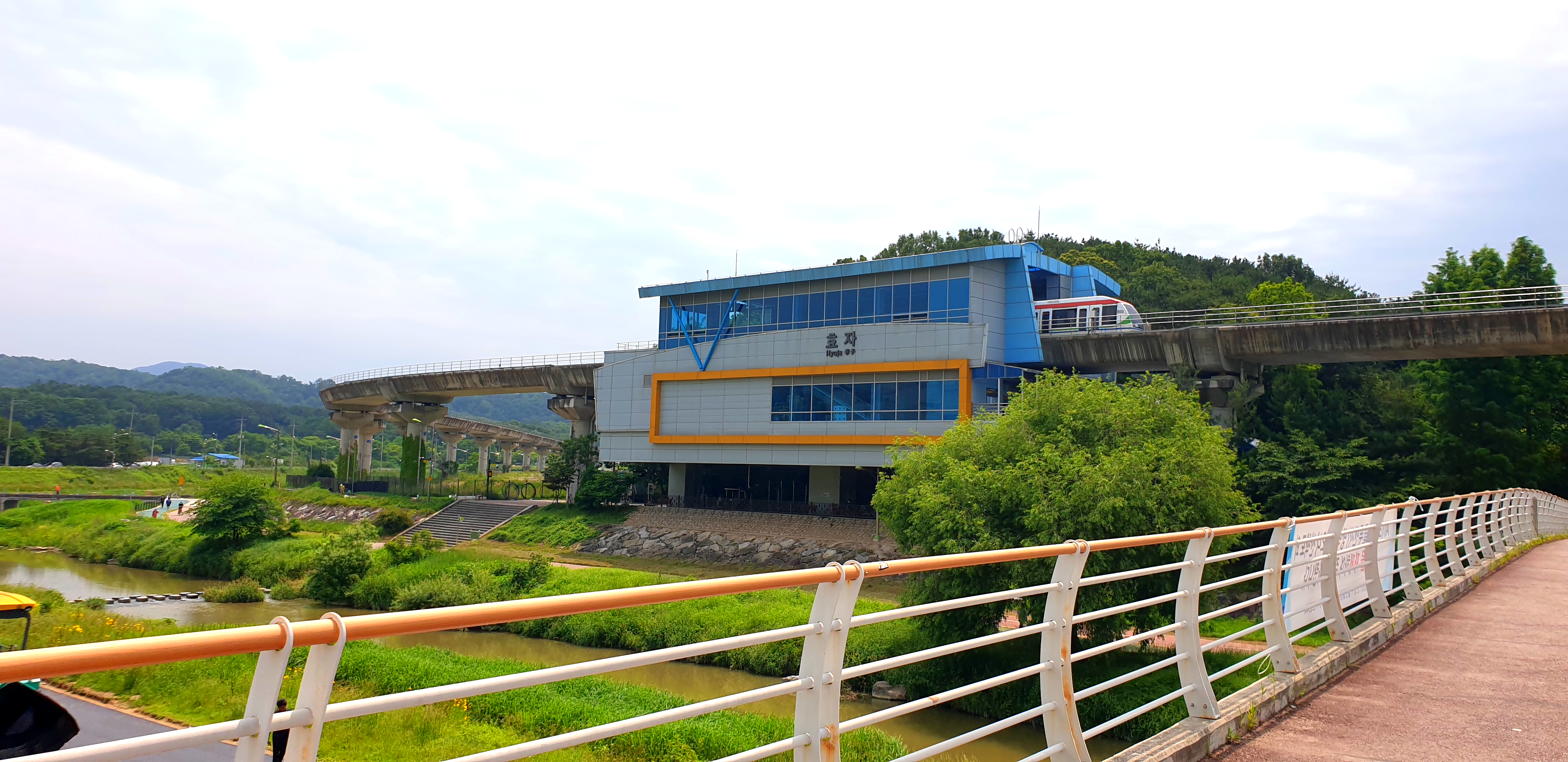

Korean name
- Hangul: 효자역
- Hanja: 孝子驛
- Revised Romanization: Hyoja yeok
- McCune–Reischauer: Hyocha yŏk

General information
- Location: Shingok-dong, Uijeongbu, Gyeonggi-do
- Coordinates: 37.7539°N 127.0772°E
- Operator: Uijeongbu Light Rail Transit Co., Ltd
- Line: U Line
- Platforms: 2
- Tracks: 2

Key dates
- July 1, 2012: U Line opened
Location

Hyoja Station (Korean: 효자역; Hanja: 孝子驛) is a station of the U Line in Shingok-dong, Uijeongbu, Gyeonggi-do, South Korea.

== Gallery ==
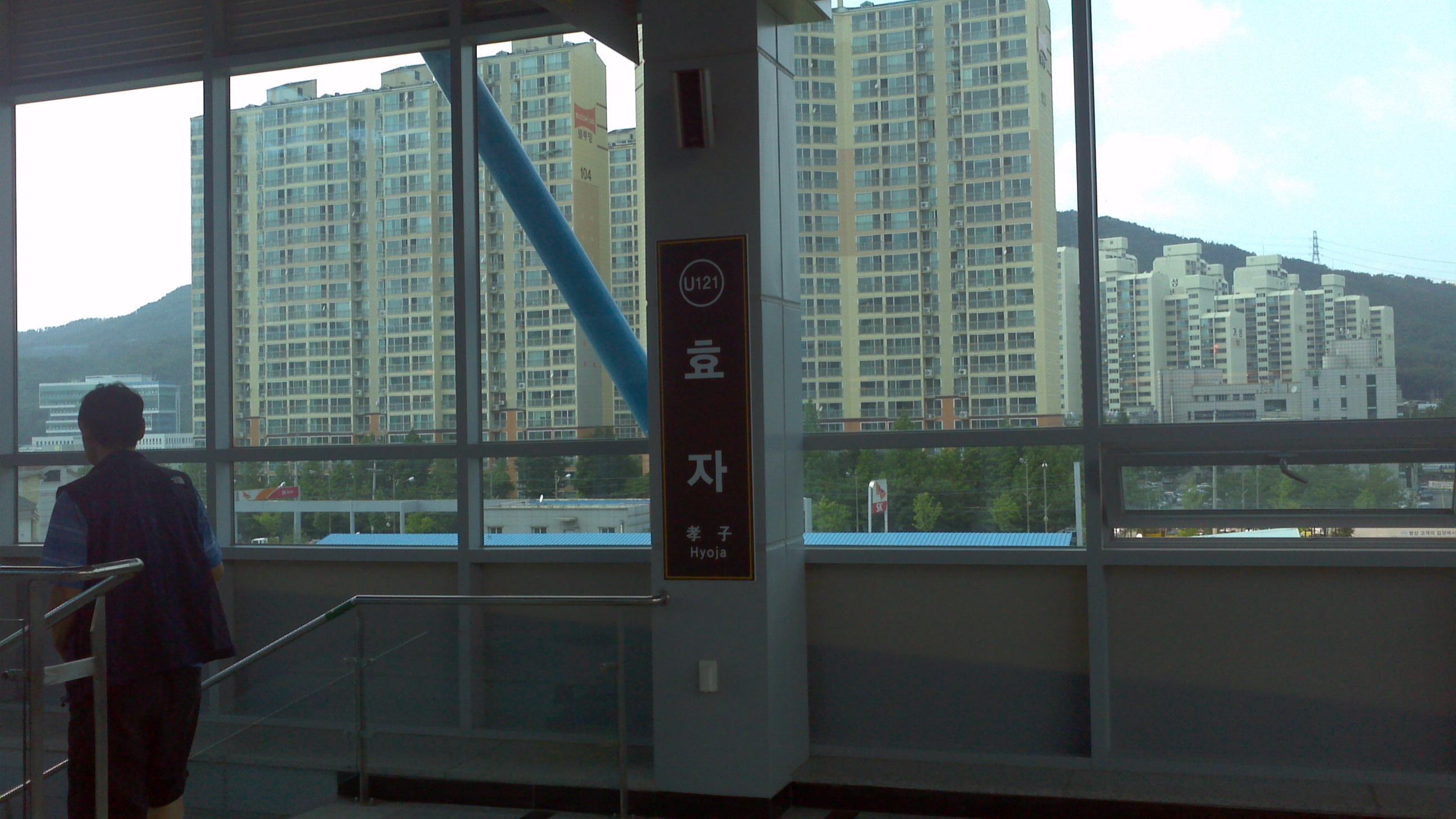
Running in board

Preceding station	Seoul Metropolitan Subway	Following station
Gyeonggi Provincial Government Northern Office towards Balgok	U Line	Gonje towards Depot Temporary Platform
