= 孝子驛 =

孝子驛 or 孝子駅 may refer to:

- Hyoja Station
- Kyōshi Station
