= Jungang station =

Jungang Station (Central station) may refer to the following stations in South Korea:

- Jungang Station (Ansan), a station on the Seoul Subway line 4 and the Suin–Bundang Line
- Jungang Station (Uijeongbu), a station of the U Line in Uijeongbu
- Jungang Station (Busan), a station on the Busan Metro line 1
- Dongducheon Jungang Station, a station on the Seoul Subway line 1 and the Gyeongwon train line
- Changwon Jungang Station, a train station on the Gyeongjeon Line
- Gwanggyo Jungang Station, a station on the Sinbundang line in Yongin
- Samseong Jungang Station, a station on the Seoul Subway line 9

== See also ==
- Central Station (disambiguation)
