= U Line =

Light rail line in Gyeonggi-do, South Korea

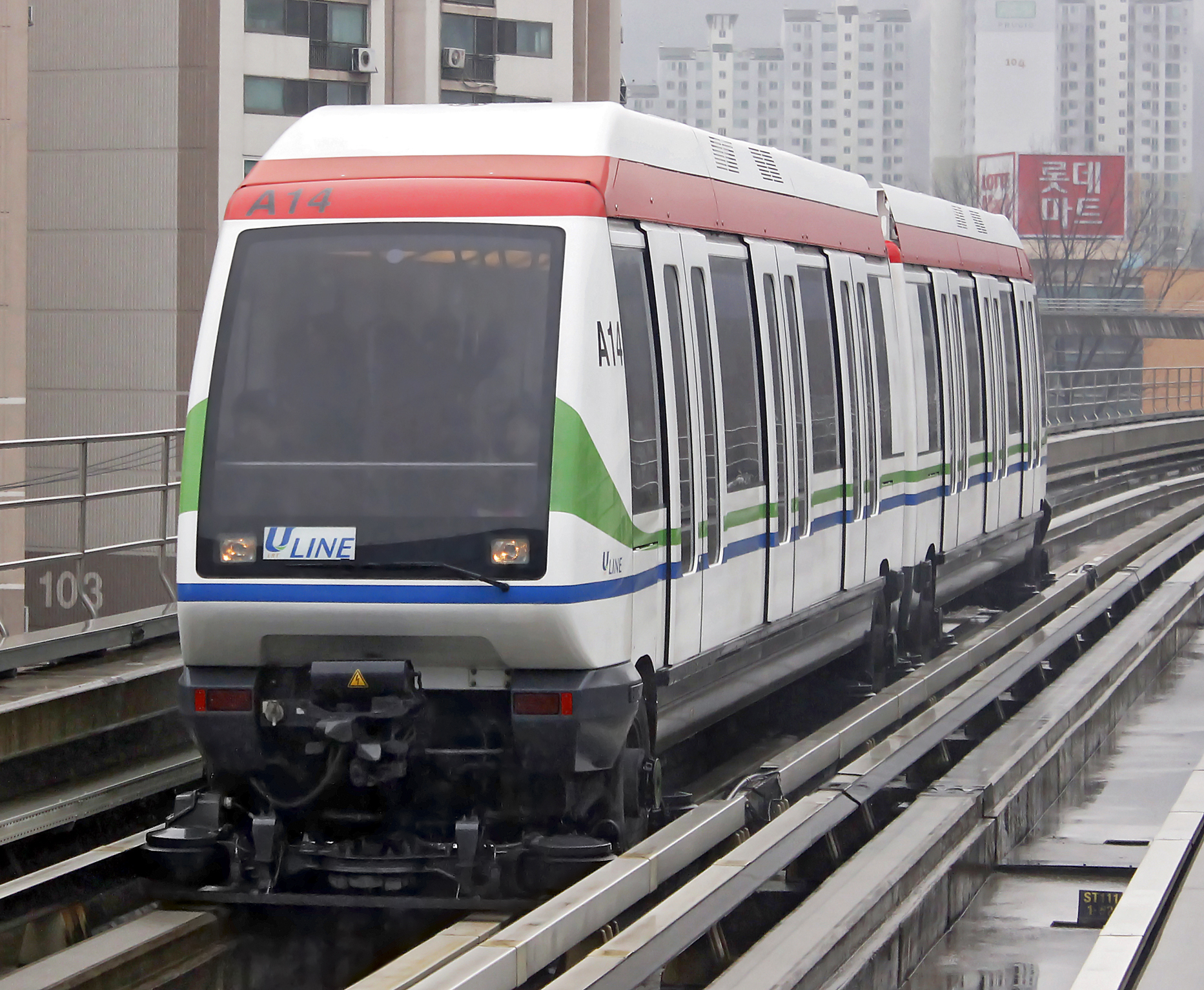

Overview
- Native name: 의정부경전철; Uijeongbu-Gyeongjeoncheol
- Status: Operational
- Termini: Balgok; Depot Temporary Platform
- Stations: 16

Service
- Type: Rubber-tyred light metro
- System: Seoul Metropolitan Subway
- Operator(s): Uijeongbu Light Rail Transit Co., Ltd
- Rolling stock: 15 × Siemens VAL 208 U100

History
- Opened: 29 June 2012 (trial); 1 July 2012 (revenue)

Technical
- Line length: 11.3 km (7.0 mi)
- Num of tracks: 2
- Track gauge: 1,620 mm (5 ft 3 25/32 in)
- Electrification: 750 V DC third rail
- Operating speed: 80 km/h (50 mph)

The U Line is a driverless, fully automatic, grade-separated rubber-tyred light metro line in Uijeongbu, Seoul Capital Area, South Korea. The "U" is short for the city Uijeongbu. The line uses Véhicule Automatique Léger (VAL) 208 trains built by Siemens Transportation Systems. The system is very similar to the Lille Metro, Toulouse Metro and Rennes Metro in France. The line color is amber.

The line is 11.2 km (7.0 mi) long on elevated track and offers a transfer to Line 1 at Hoeryong Station. Single rides cost 1,550 won. During rush hours trains come every 3 and a half minutes with trains coming every 6 to 10 minutes during all other hours. Trains are in service 19.5 hours a day, from 5 am until 12:30 am. From Balgok Station to Tapseok Station, the U Line will take riders 19 minutes and 54 seconds, versus a car, at 31 minutes 6 seconds, or a public bus, taking 40 minutes and 6 seconds. Two extensions are planned.

After four and a half years of operating at a continual loss, a debt of 240 billion won prompted board members of the Uijeongbu Light Rail Transit Company to file for bankruptcy in late 2016. If the Seoul Central District Court agrees to the filing then operation reverts to the city government. On 5 January 2017, Uijeongbu Mayor Ahn Byung-yong promised the line would continue operation.

== History ==
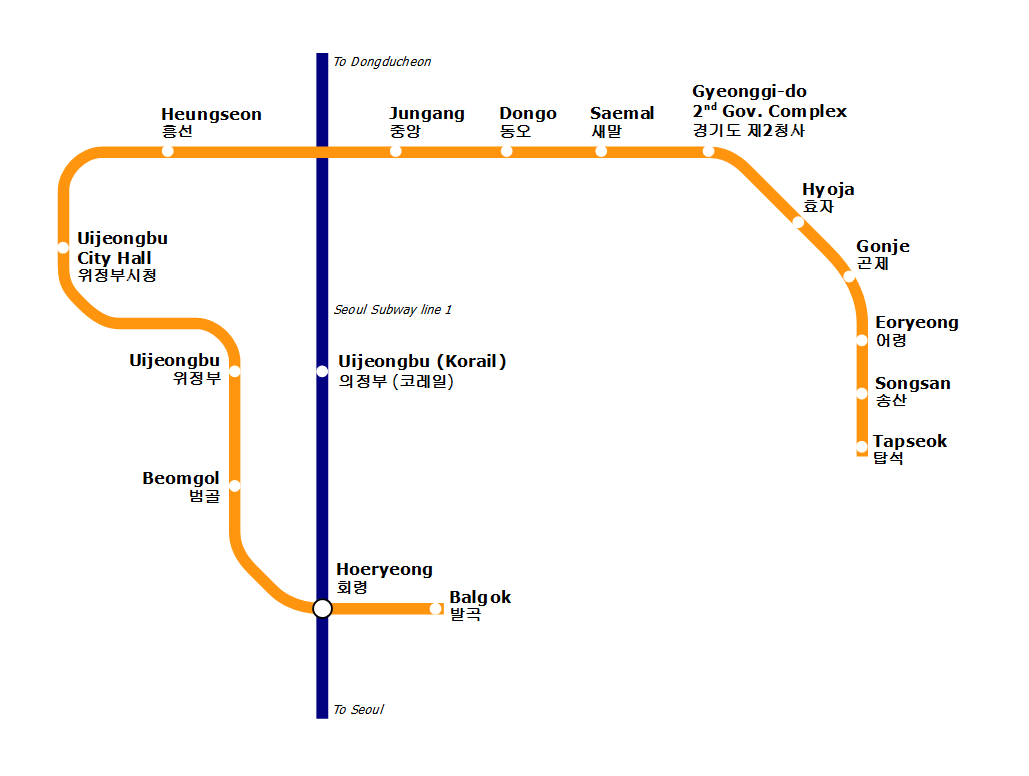
VAL network map

- 1995 December – Initial planning
- 2004 August – GS Construction Consortium is picked
- 2005 October – Operating company is established
- 2007 July – Construction groundbreaking ceremony
- 2007 August – Full construction begins
- 2011 Summer – All track has been laid
- 2011 Fall – Signal work completion
- 2012 February to June- Testing of system
- 2012 June 29–30 – Free rides prior to official opening
- 2012 July 1 – Revenue service begins
- 2014 December 6 – Joins metropolitan unity fare allowing transfers to other lines and buses. Fares start from 1,350, with a flat 300 won extra charge if transferring from Line 1.

== Fares ==
The U Line is physically connected to the Seoul Metropolitan Subway system and allows payment via the T-money smart card. It allows transfer to other lines and buses since 6 December 2014. Discounts are available for youth and free rides exist for those over 65 years of age.

== Rolling stock ==
The line uses VAL 208 rolling stock also used on the metros in Lille, Toulouse, Rennes (Line A only), and Turin, as well as the CDGVAL at Charles de Gaulle Airport in Paris. However, unlike those cities, the trains have air conditioning to suit the more humid climate of South Korea.

== Stations ==
There is no station numbered U116.

All stations are in Uijeongbu, Gyeonggi-do.

Station number	Station name		Transfer	Station distance	Total distance
Station number	Romanized	Hangul	Transfer	in km	
U110	Balgok	발곡		---	0.0
U111	Hoeryong	회룡	Seoul Subway Line 1	0.8	0.8
U112	Beomgol	범골		0.6	1.4
U113	LRT Uijeongbu	경전철의정부		1.0	2.4
U114	Uijeongbu City Hall	의정부시청		0.9	3.3
U115	Heungseon	흥선		0.6	3.9
U117	Uijeongbu Jung-ang	의정부중앙		1.1	5.0
U118	Dong-o	동오		0.7	5.7
U119	Sae-mal	새말		0.8	6.5
U120	Gyeonggi Provincial Government Northern Office	경기도청북부청사		0.6	7.2
U121	Hyoja	효자		0.6	7.8
U122	Gonje	곤제		0.8	8.6
U123	Eoryong (Yonghyeon Industrial Complex)	어룡 (용현산업단지)		0.9	9.5
U124	Songsan	송산		0.6	10.1
U125	Tapseok	탑석	(planned)	0.5	10.6
U126	Depot Temporary Platform (Cultural Convergence Complex)	차량기지 임시승강장 (복합문화융합단지)		0.7	11.3

== See also ==
- Subways in South Korea
- Seoul Metropolitan Subway
