= Hoeryong station =

Metro station in Uijeongbu, South Korea

Coordinates: 37°43′25″N 127°02′52″E

회룡; Hoeryong
회룡; Hoeryong
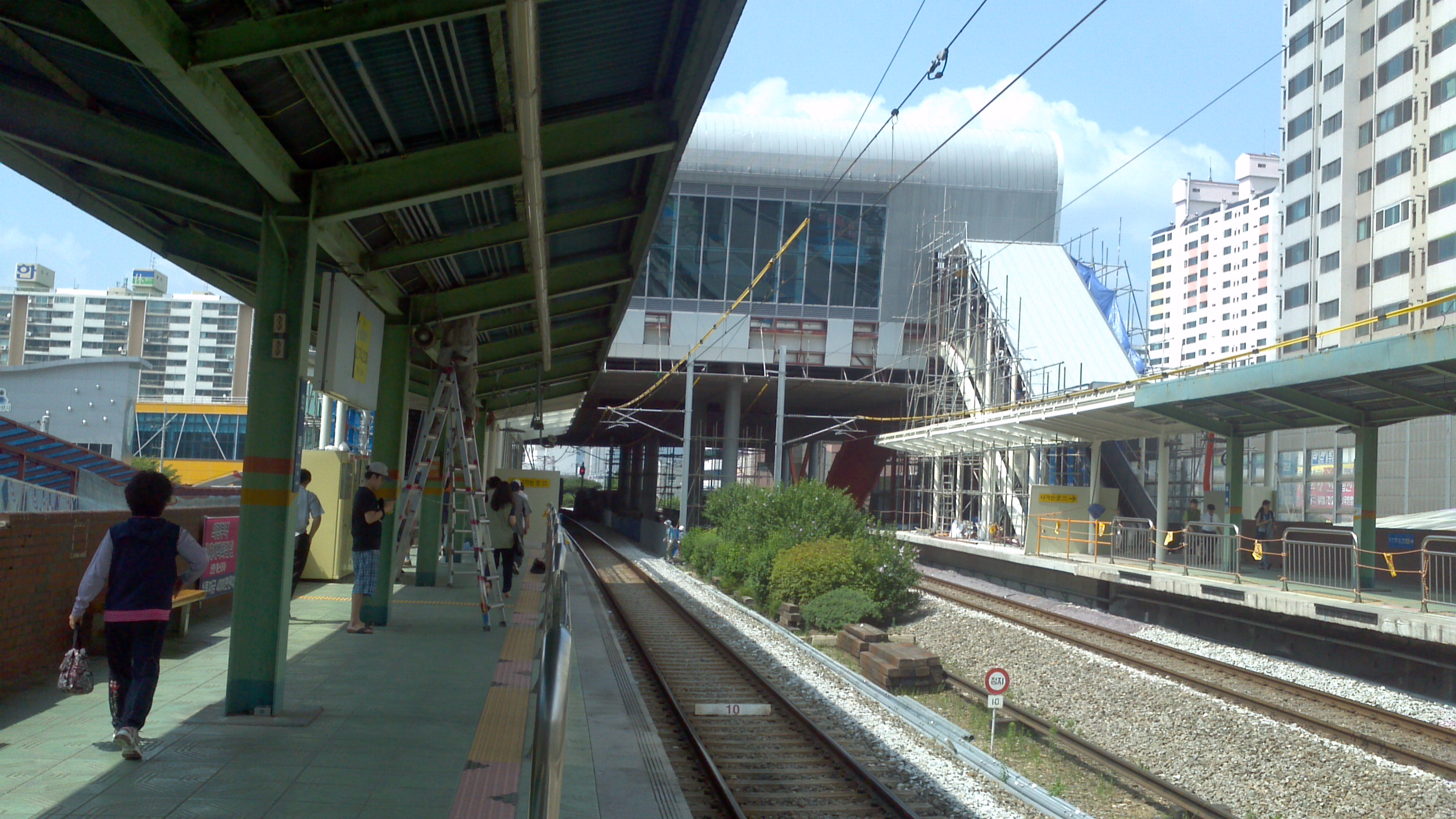
- Line 1 platform

Korean name
- Hangul: 회룡역
- Hanja: 回龍驛
- Revised Romanization: Hoeryongnyeok
- McCune–Reischauer: Hoeryongnyŏk

General information
- Location: 50-5 Howon 2-dong, 363 Pyeonghwa-ro, Uijeongbu-si, Gyeonggi-do
- Operator: Korail; Uijeongbu Light Rail Transit Co., Ltd
- Lines: Line 1 U Line
- Platforms: 4
- Tracks: 4

Construction
- Structure type: Aboveground (U Line); Ground (Line 1)

Key dates
- September 2, 1986: Line 1 opened
- July 1, 2012: U Line opened
Services
Preceding station	Seoul Metropolitan Subway	Following station
Uijeongbu towards Yeoncheon	Line 1	Mangwolsa towards Incheon
Uijeongbu towards Dongducheon	Line 1 Gyeongwon Express	Dobongsan towards Incheon
Balgok Terminus	U Line	Beomgol towards Depot Temporary Platform
Location

Hoeryong Station is a metro station on Seoul Subway Line 1. In July 2012, it became a transfer station on the U Line. It lies in the city of Uijeongbu.

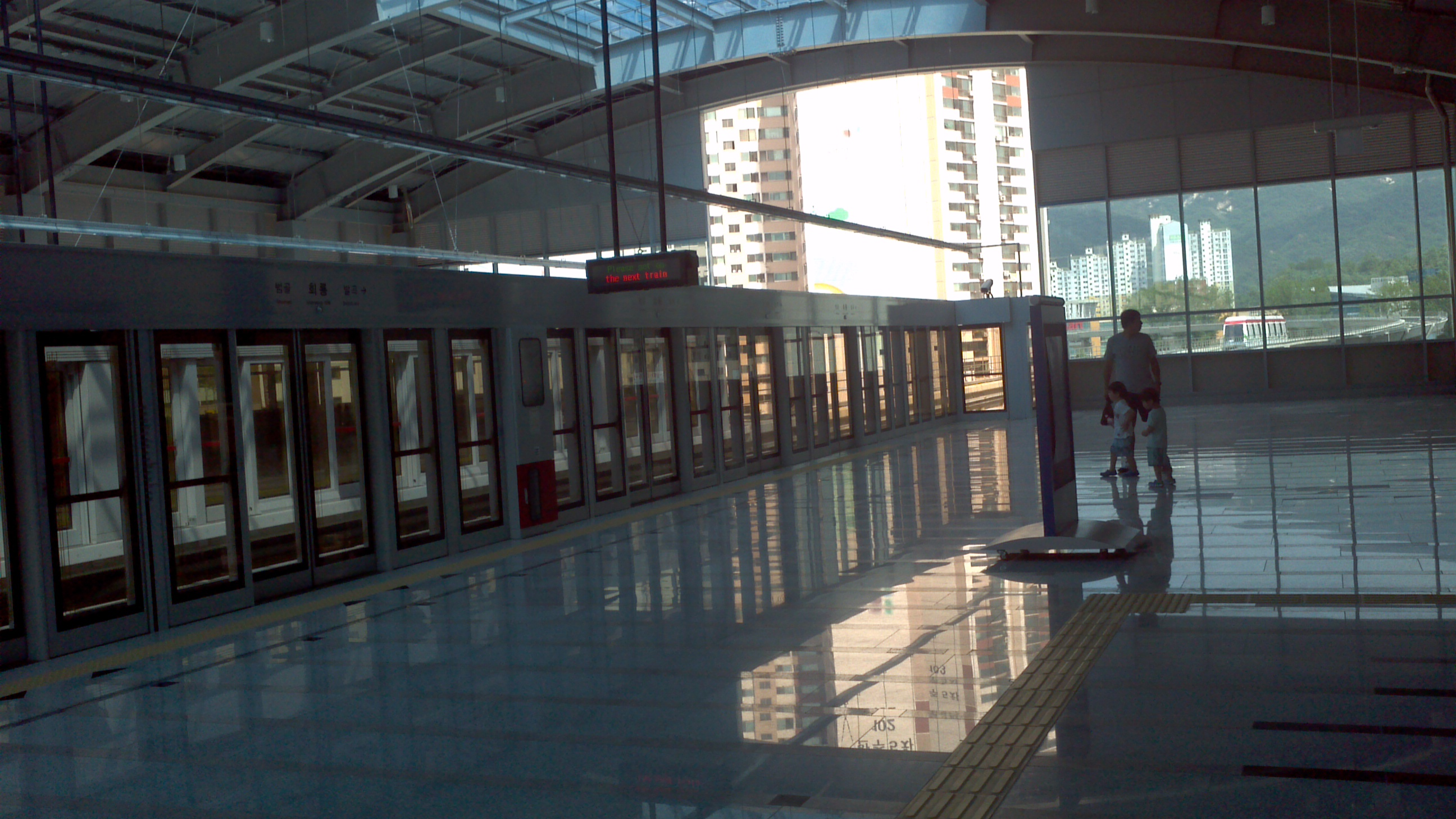
U Line platform
