= Balgok station =

Metro station in Uijeongbu, South Korea

Coordinates: 37.726984°N 127.052889°E

발곡; Balgok
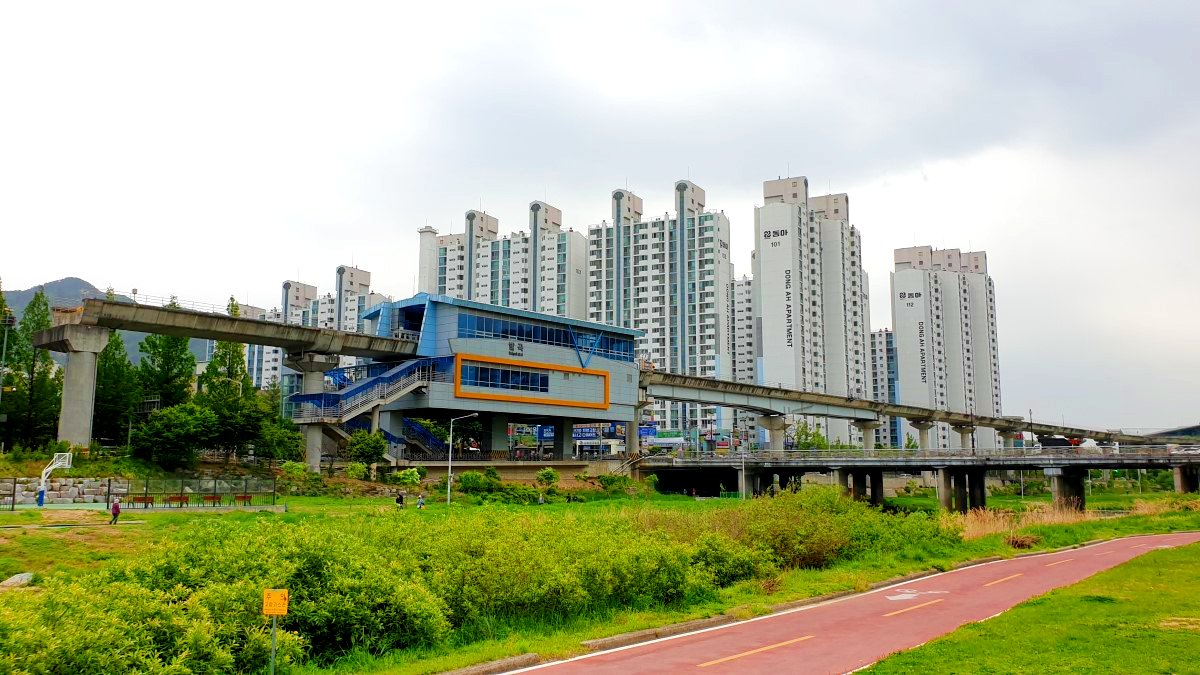
- Station Building

Korean name
- Hangul: 발곡역
- Hanja: 鉢谷驛
- Revised Romanization: Balgong-nyeok
- McCune–Reischauer: Palgong-nyŏk

General information
- Location: 741-3 Singok-dong, 258 Janggok-ro, Uijeongbu-si, Gyeonggi-do
- Operator: Uijeongbu Light Rail Transit Co., Ltd
- Line: U Line
- Platforms: 2
- Tracks: 2

Construction
- Structure type: Aboveground

History
- Opened: July 1, 2012

Services
Preceding station	Seoul Metropolitan Subway	Following station
Terminus	U Line	Hoeryong towards Depot Temporary Platform
Location

Balgok station (Korean: 발곡역; Hanja: 鉢谷驛) is the first stop of the U Line, in Uijeongbu, South Korea. It opened to the public on June 29, 2012, with revenue starting on July 1.

== Station layout ==
L2; Platform level	Side platform, doors will open on the right
L2; Platform level	Westbound	U Line toward Depot Temporary Platform (Hoeryong) →
L2; Platform level	Eastbound	Not in use
L2; Platform level	Side platform, doors will open on the left

L1; Concourse	Lobby	Customer service, shops, vending machines, ATMs

G	Street level	Exit

== Gallery ==
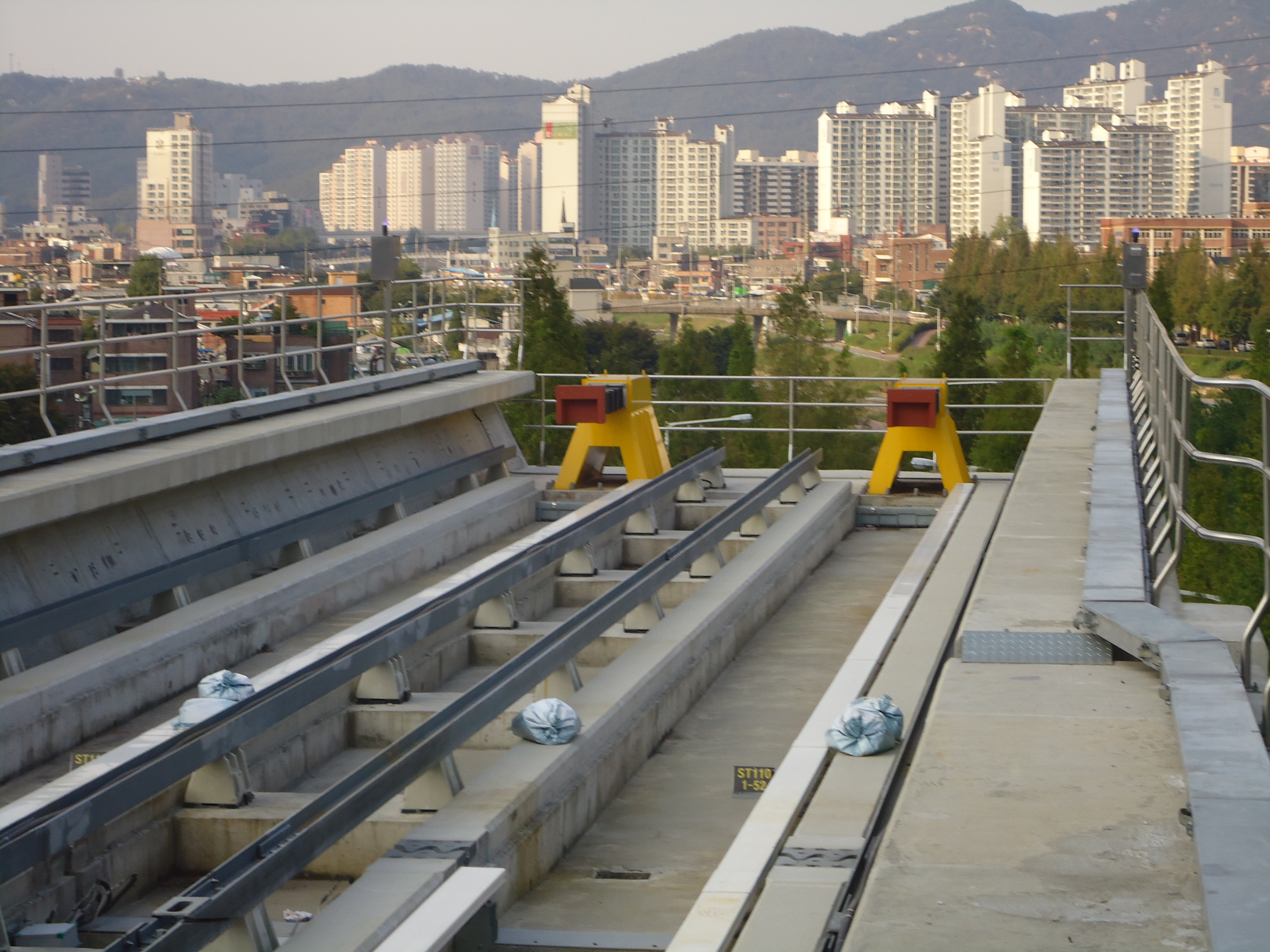
Track end

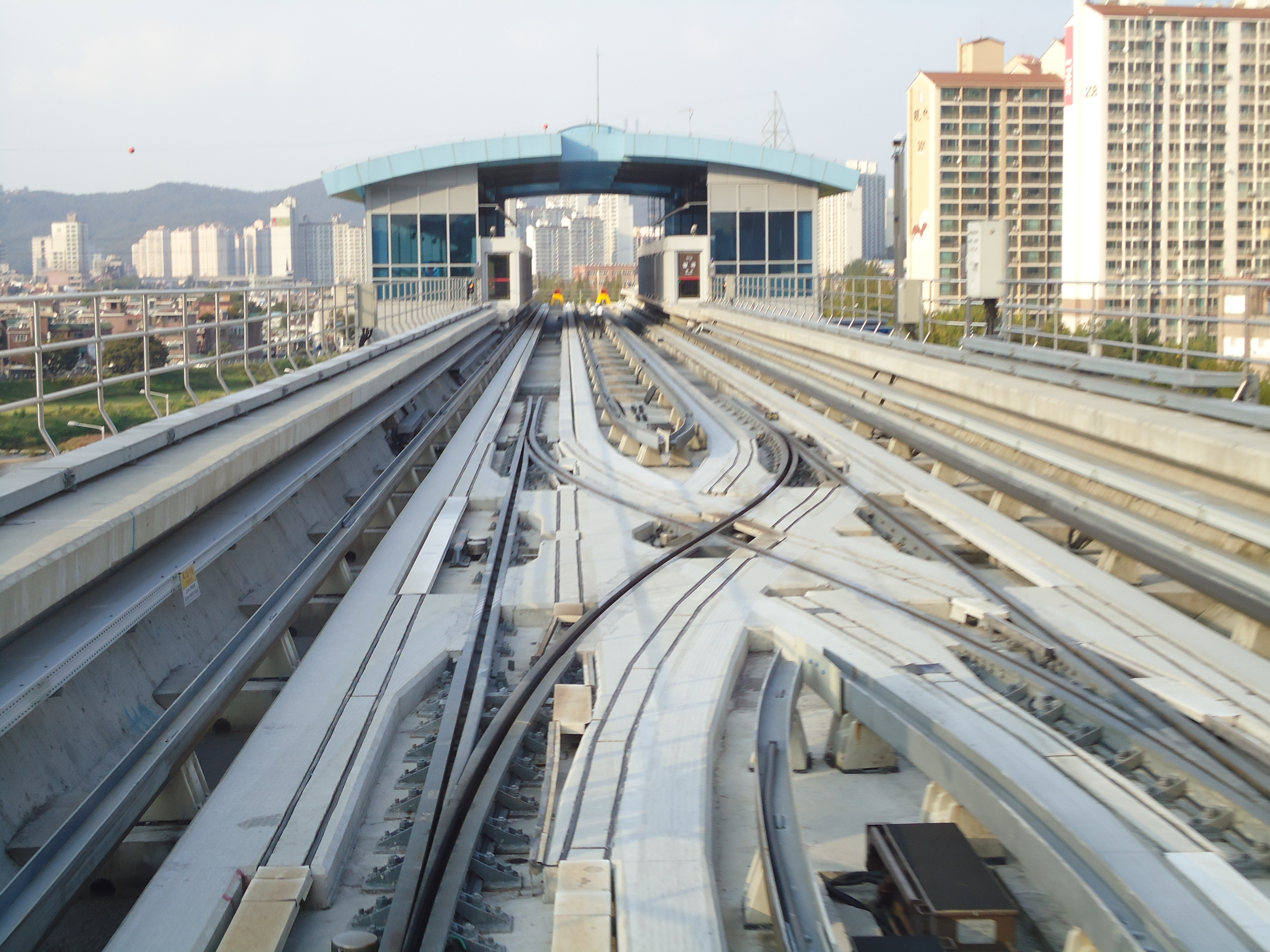
Approaching to Balgok station
