= Uijeongbu =

City in Gyeonggi, South Korea

- Municipal city
- Panoramic view of Uijeongbu

- Flag Emblem of Uijeongbu
- Interactive map of Uijeongbu
- Coordinates: 37°44′55″N 127°02′20″E
- Country: South Korea
- Province: Gyeonggi
- Administrative divisions: 15 dong

Area
  - Total: 81.59 km^{2} (31.50 sq mi)

Population (September 2024)
  - Total: 460,284
  - Density: 5,350.3/km^{2} (13,857/sq mi)
  - Dialect: Seoul
- Website: https://www.ui4u.go.kr/main.do (in Korean)

Korean name
- Hangul: 의정부시
- Hanja: 議政府市
- RR: Uijeongbu-si
- MR: Ŭijŏngbu-si

Uijeongbu (Korean: 의정부; Korean pronunciation: [ɰi.dʑʌŋ.bu]) is a city in Gyeonggi Province, South Korea. It is the tenth-most populous city in the province and a suburb of Seoul within the greater Seoul Metropolitan Area.

== History ==
Uijeongbu was established in 1400, during the reign of Jeongjong. The city housed the Yeonguijeong (Chief State Councillor), Jwauijeong (Left State Councillor) and Uuijeong (Right State Councillor) who oversaw state affairs while assisting the monarch until 1907.

== Overview ==
Uijeongbu is located north of the South Korean capital Seoul; it lies inside a defile, with mountains on two sides, and commands a natural choke point across the main traditional invasion route from the North into Seoul. As such it has a continued military significance and it contains U.S. and South Korean military bases, positioned for the defense of the South Korean capital. The U.S. Second Infantry Division has established a headquarters post in Uijeongbu, with the main troops being deployed from Dongducheon. U.S. military bases in Uijeongbu have since closed.

Despite being known for its military presence, the area has boomed into a satellite community of Seoul with shops, cinemas, restaurants and bars, internet cafes, and DVD bangs. In addition to U.S. personnel, it is popular with the English hagwon (a for-profit private institute, academy or cram school). There are several mountains such as Mt. Dobong (Dobongsan), Mt. Surak and Mt. Soyo. The mountains are popular recreational areas for hiking and are frequented by residents living in the Seoul Metropolitan area.

This city is also famous for its budae-jjigae (lit. 'army base stew'), made with hot dogs and SPAM. In the late 20th century, many wanted the dish to be referred as Uijeongbu jjigae to remove the military or war-time connotations it had associated with it. However, not many restaurants followed this guideline. Some restaurants have begun calling their product Uijeongbu budae jjigae. The city also contains what locals refer to as "buddaejjigae street", a street where there is a high concentration of army base stew restaurants.

== Transport ==
VAL network map

A VAL driverless metro system, U Line, is an elevated line, 11.067 km (6.877 mi) long, covering 15 stations. It had its grand opening on 26 June 2012 with normal passenger operations on 1 July 2012.

Uijeongbu is also served by the Seoul Metropolitan Subway's Line 1 and Line 7. The six stations within the city boundaries are Nogyang, Ganeung, Uijeongbu, Hoeryong, Mangwolsa, and Jangam. It takes around 40 minutes to reach Uijeongbu from central Seoul by subway.

Extensive bus routes cover north-eastern Gyeonggi Province. There are three basic kinds: ilban bus, normal bus; jwaseok bus, larger and slightly more expensive; and maeul bus, "village bus", a smaller bus with fewer seats. An intercity bus station is available for longer distances. Airport limousine buses run frequently to both Incheon and Gimpo airports.

== Education ==
The South Korean educational system, regarded as one of the most difficult in the world, officially incorporates Primary or Elementary, Middle, Secondary, Vocational and Tertiary levels. Anything below primary school is not required. Uijeongbu is home to several educational establishments, most of which are available to both South Korean citizens and foreign nationals. Some schools, however, are only accessible to the families and other affiliates of the US Army. The schools in Uijeongbu range from the standard Korean high school, such as Gyeonggi High School, to the Americanized, International Christian School which lies in the northern part of the city, close to Nogyang Station. Earlier forms of education, such as kindergarten, are not compulsory in South Korea and young children traditionally remain with the family as long as possible, but many are still available. One such establishment is the privately run kindergarten, Yebbeun Kindergarten or Pretty Kindergarten (예쁜유치원) which is located near Saemal Station. From the age of six, school children in Uijeongbu, like most of South Korea, begin attending elementary school. There are several elementary schools throughout Uijeongbu, such as Yonghyun primary school (용현초등학교), or 방학초등학교, and Vocational Elementary school, so a wide variety is provided. The next stage of schooling begins around the age of thirteen and is a part of middle school education. Uijeongbu has a few middle schools, such as Solmoe Middle School (솔뫼중학교), located in the southeastern part of the city, right off Route 43. The high school or secondary level of education is widely available in Uijeongbu as well. With high schools like the aforementioned Gyeonggi High School, or Uijeongbu High School which is known for its unusual graduation "dress up" ritual. There is an apparent lack of vocational high schools or those that focus on specialized curricula, such as fishery or economics. However, there are several higher education options at the tertiary level available in Uijeongbu. One such school is the Shinhan University, which has an extensive array of choices for majors ranging from culinary to nursing. Uijeongbu is also the site of Kyungmin College, which prepares teachers.

== Land usage ==
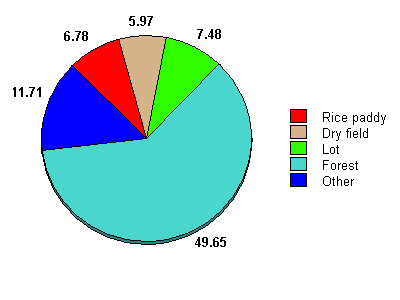

== Climate ==
Uijeongbu has a monsoon-influenced humid continental climate (Köppen: Dwa) with cold, dry winters and hot, rainy summers.

Climate data for Uijeongbu (1993–2020 normals)
Month	Jan	Feb	Mar	Apr	May	Jun	Jul	Aug	Sep	Oct	Nov	Dec	Year
Mean daily maximum °C (°F)	1.8 (35.2)	5.1 (41.2)	11.5 (52.7)	18.4 (65.1)	24.1 (75.4)	28.0 (82.4)	29.3 (84.7)	30.3 (86.5)	26.2 (79.2)	20.0 (68.0)	11.7 (53.1)	3.6 (38.5)	17.5 (63.5)
Daily mean °C (°F)	−3.5 (25.7)	−0.5 (31.1)	5.1 (41.2)	11.7 (53.1)	17.4 (63.3)	22.0 (71.6)	25.0 (77.0)	25.2 (77.4)	20.1 (68.2)	13.3 (55.9)	6.0 (42.8)	−1.5 (29.3)	11.7 (53.1)
Mean daily minimum °C (°F)	−8.7 (16.3)	−5.8 (21.6)	−0.6 (30.9)	5.5 (41.9)	11.4 (52.5)	16.9 (62.4)	21.3 (70.3)	21.5 (70.7)	15.5 (59.9)	7.5 (45.5)	0.7 (33.3)	−6.5 (20.3)	6.6 (43.9)
Average precipitation mm (inches)	16.0 (0.63)	25.2 (0.99)	33.3 (1.31)	72.4 (2.85)	99.6 (3.92)	127.4 (5.02)	425.7 (16.76)	399.2 (15.72)	133.9 (5.27)	54.3 (2.14)	48.6 (1.91)	20.6 (0.81)	1,456.2 (57.33)
Average precipitation days (≥ 0.1 mm)	3.0	3.5	5.5	6.7	7.4	7.4	13.3	12.1	6.9	5.3	6.6	4.6	82.3
Source: Korea Meteorological Administration

== Sister cities ==
- Shibata, Niigata, Japan
- Dandong, Liaoning, China
- Harbin, Heilongjiang, China
- Gokseong County, South Jeolla Province, South Korea
- Richmond, Virginia, United States
- Davao City, Mindanao, Philippines

== In popular culture ==
- In the TV series M*A*S*H, the city (then just a village) was the location of the fictional 4077th Mobile Army Surgical Hospital.
- Joey Lawrence's character on the TV series Melissa & Joey was born in an unspecified U.S. Army hospital in the city.

== Notable people ==
- Yoo Na-ul, member of R&B group Brown Eyed Soul
- Dong Young-bae (Taeyang), member of K-pop boy group BigBang
- Lee Min-hyuk, member of K-pop boy group Monsta X
- Lee Chan-hyuk, member of K-pop duo AKMU
- Lee Su-hyun, member of K-pop duo AKMU
- Lee Jun-young, member of K-pop boy group U-KISS
- Jun.Q, member of K-pop boy group Myname
- Jung Ha-na, former member of K-pop girl group Secret
- Hwang In-youp, actor and model
- Olivia Hye, member of K-pop girl group Loona

== See also ==
- List of cities in South Korea
- Gyeonggibuk Science High School, in Uijeongbu
