= Chaokai railway =

Railway line in China

Chaokai railway 朝开铁路

Overview
- Status: Operational
- Owner: Tiantu Railway (1923–1933); Manchukuo National Railway (1933–1945); China Railway (since 1945)
- Locale: Jilin
- Termini: Chaoyangchuan; Kaishantun, formerly Sambong, Korea
- Stations: 6

Service
- Type: Heavy rail, Regional rail

History
- Opened: 1923 (Tiantu Ry, narrow gauge); March 1934 (Manchukuo National Ry, std gauge)

Technical
- Line length: 58.4 km (36.3 mi)
- Track gauge: 1,435 mm (4 ft 8 1/2 in) standard gauge
- Old gauge: 762 mm (2 ft 6 in)

The Chaokai railway (simplified Chinese: 朝开铁路; traditional Chinese: 朝開鐵路; pinyin: Cháokāi Tiělù) is a 58.4 km (36.3 mi) freight-only railway line of the China Railway in Jilin, connecting Chaoyangchuan on the Changtu Railway with Kaishantun. The line formerly crossed the Tumen River to reach Sambong in modern-day North Korea, but the bridge has since had the tracks removed, and is in use as a road crossing.

== History ==
In 1917, the Chosen Government Railway's (Sentetsu) Hamgyeong Line reached Hoeryeong. Soon afterwards the Domun Railway began construction of its mainline from Hoeryeong to Donggwanjin, reaching Sambong (then called Sangsambong) in 1920, Jongseon in 1922 and finally Donggwanjin in 1924. The narrow-gauge Tiantu Railway (天圖鐵道, Chinese pinyin: Tiāntú Tiědào; Japanese: Tento Tetsudō), opened in 1923, signed a cross-border operational agreement with the Domun Railway on 26 June 1926, after which a bridge across the Tumen River between Sangsambong and Kaishantun was opened on 30 September 1927. In 1929 the Domun Railway was nationalised and absorbed by Sentetsu, and on 1 August 1933, Sentetsu's new line from the port at Unggi to Hoeryoeng was completed. In the same year, the Manchukuo National Railway ("MNR") completed its Jingtu Line from Xinjing (now Changchun), the capital of Manchukuo, to Tumen.

In October 1933, the South Manchuria Railway (Mantetsu) took over management of Sentetsu's entire line from Ch'ŏngjin to Unggi, and at that time, the Hoeryŏng–Sangsambong section was added to the existing (Wŏnsan–Ch'ŏngjin) Hamgyŏng Line, the Sambong–Namyang section was renamed the North Chosen West Line (Puksŏn-sŏbusŏn, 북선서부선), and the Namyang–Unggi section was renamed North Chosen East Line (Puksŏn-tongbusŏn, 북선동부선). Connecting the Jingtu Line with the North Chosen East Line would create a short, direct route from Japan to Xinjing and Harbin, and so National Railway bought the Tiantu Railway in 1933.

The MNR began work on the Chaokai Line in 1933, regauging the Tiantu Railway's line from 762 mm (2 ft 6 in) narrow gauge to standard gauge (1,435 mm (4 ft 8 1/2 in)) and making a shorter, more direct line from Kaishantun to Chaoyangchuan on the Jingtu Line, opening the new line for use at the end of March 1934. The line at once became a very important link between Japan and the Asian mainland via the Korean port of Rajin.

In 1940 there were seven passenger trains between Chaoyangchuan and Sambong and eight from Sambong to Chaoyanghcuan, with a second-class ticket for the full distance costing 1 Manchukuo yuan 8 chiao 3 fen, and a third-class ticket costing 1 yuan 1 chiao. Travel time ranged from as short as 3 hours (Train 1220, leaving Sambong at 9:55 am and arriving at Chaoyangchuan at 2:05 pm), to as long as 4 hours 5 minutes (Train 1222, leaving Sambong at 4:40 pm and arriving at Chaoyangchuan at 8:45 pm). There were also several trains over shorter relations, including Chaoyangchuan–Badaohe and Chaoyangchuan–Longjing. Two KiHa-3 class railcars were assigned to passenger services on this line.

By the time the last timetable was issued prior to the start of the Pacific War in November 1942, service on the line had been cut back to three return trips between Chaoyangchuan and Sambong – one each in the morning, afternoon, and evening. These were still operated by 3rd class railcar.

== Route ==
Distance		Station name			
Total; km	S2S; km	Current name	Former name	Opened	Connections
0.0	0.0	Chaoyangchuan 朝阳川		1923	Changtu Railway
9.7	9.7	Sangfengdong 三峰洞		1923	
18.6	8.9	Longjing 龙井		1923	Helong Railway (zh)
28.7	10.1	Dongshengyong 东盛涌		1923	
41.4	12.7	Badaohe 八道河		1923	
58.4	17.0	Kaishantun 开山屯		1923	
		Tumen River	China–North Korea border	1927	Closed 1945
60.6	2.2	Sambong 삼봉	Sangsambong 상삼봉	1920	Korean State Railway Hambuk Line
