= Songpyong station =

Railway station in North Korea

Sŏngp'yŏng 성평역

Korean name
- Hangul: 성평역
- Hanja: 城坪驛
- Revised Romanization: Seongpyeong-yeok
- McCune–Reischauer: Sŏngp'yŏng-yŏk

General information
- Location: Kangal-li, Onsŏng, North Hamgyŏng; North Korea
- Owner: Korean State Railway

History
- Opened: 1 December 1922
- Original company: Tomun Railway

Services
Preceding station	Korean State Railway	Following station
Kangal-li Terminus	Sŏngp'yŏng Line	Terminus

Sŏngp'yŏng station is a railway station in Kangal-li, Onsŏng County, North Hamgyŏng, North Korea; it is the endpoint of the Sŏngp'yŏng Line of the Korean State Railway.

== History ==
The station was opened by the Tomun Railway Company on 1 December 1922, together with the rest of the Sŏngp'yŏng Line as well as the Sangsambong–Chongsŏng section of their mainline from Hoeryŏng to Tonggwanjin. On 1 April 1929 the Tomun Railway was nationalised and became the West Tomun Line of the Chosen Government Railway.
