= Kanpyong station =

Railway station in North Korea

Kanp'yŏng 간평
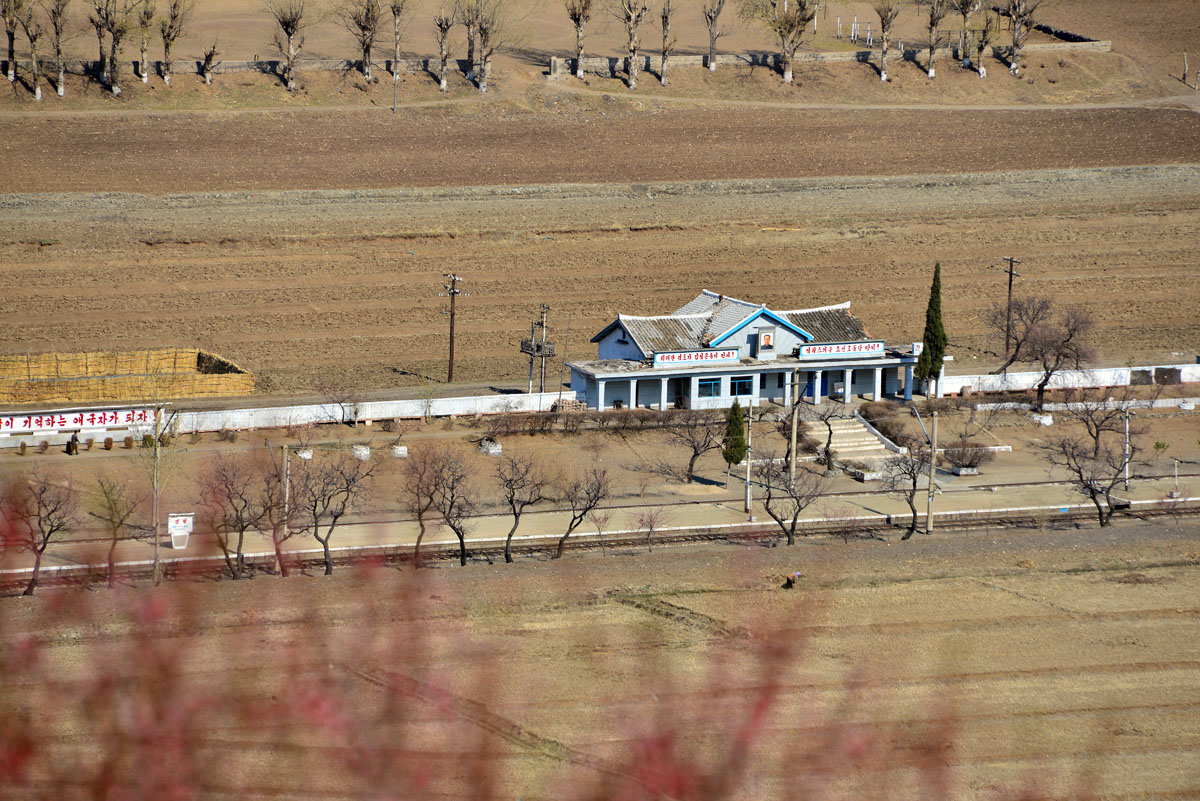
- Kanp'yŏng station

Korean name
- Hangul: 간평역
- Hanja: 間坪驛
- Revised Romanization: Ganpyeong-yeok
- McCune–Reischauer: Kanp'yŏng-yŏk

General information
- Location: Hoeryŏng-si, North Hamgyŏng; North Korea
- Owner: Korean State Railway

History
- Opened: 5 January 1920

Services
Preceding station	Korean State Railway	Following station
Sambong towards Rajin	Hambuk Line	Sinjŏn towards Ch'ŏngjin Ch'ŏngnyŏn
Location

Kanp'yŏng station is a railway station in Hoeryŏng-si, North Hamgyŏng, North Korea, on the Hambuk Line of the Korean State Railway.

== History ==
It was opened by the Tomun Railway Company on 5 January 1920, together with the rest of the Hoeryŏng-Sangsambong section of their line (Hoeryŏng-Tonggwanjin), which on 1 April 1929 was nationalised and became the West Tomun Line of the Chosen Government Railway.
