= Kumsaeng station =

Railway station in North Korea

Kŭmsaeng 금생
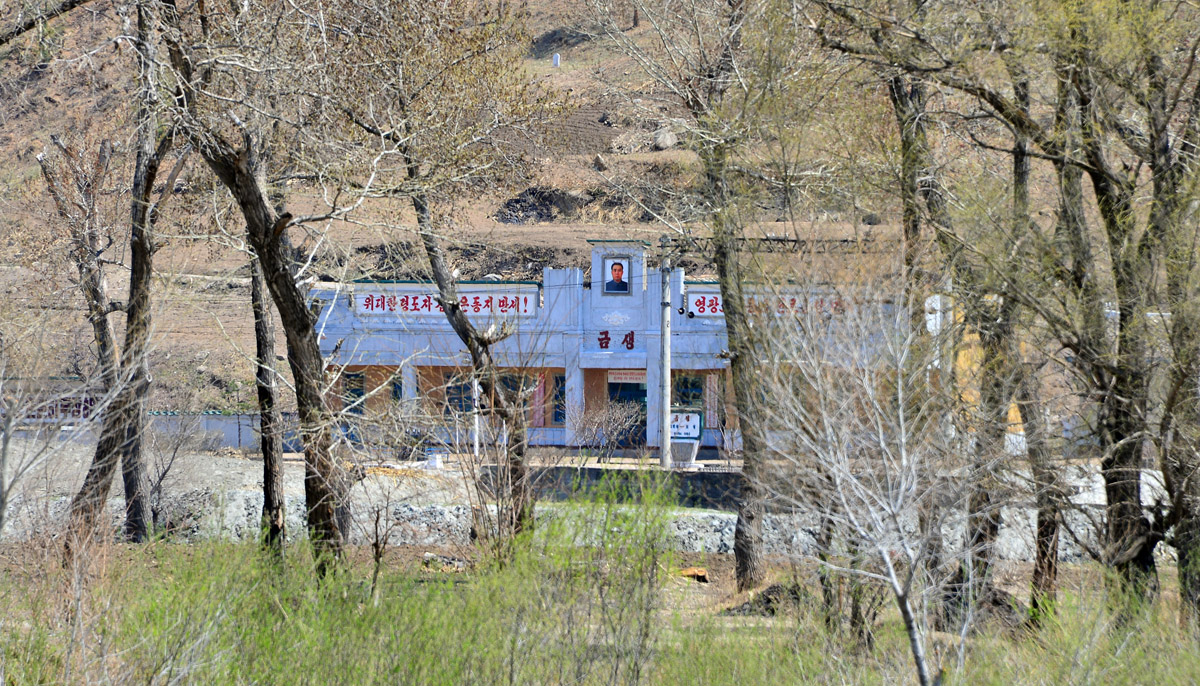
- Kŭmsaeng station

Korean name
- Hangul: 금생역
- Hanja: 金生驛
- Revised Romanization: Geumsaeng-yeok
- McCune–Reischauer: Kŭmsaeng-yŏk

General information
- Location: Kŭmsaeng-ri, Hoeryŏng-si, North Hamgyŏng; North Korea
- Coordinates: 42.4782°N 129.7459°E
- Owner: Korean State Railway

History
- Opened: 5 January 1920

Services
Preceding station	Korean State Railway	Following station
Koryŏngjin towards Rajin	Hambuk Line	Hoeryŏng Ch'ŏngnyŏn towards Ch'ŏngjin Ch'ŏngnyŏn
Location

Kŭmsaeng station is a railway station in Kŭmsaeng-ri, greater Hoeryŏng city, North Hamgyŏng, North Korea, on the Hambuk Line of the Korean State Railway.

== History ==
It was opened by the Tomun Railway Company on 5 January 1920, together with the rest of the Hoeryŏng-Sangsambong section of their line (Hoeryŏng-Tonggwanjin), which on 1 April 1929 was nationalised and became the West Tomun Line of the Chosen Government Railway.
