= Songpyong Line =

Railway line in North Korea

Sŏngp'yŏng Line

Overview
- Native name: 성평선(城坪線)
- Status: Closed
- Owner: Tomun Railway (1924–1929); Chosen Government Railway (1929–1934); South Manchuria Railway (1934–1940); Chosen Government Railway (1940–1945); Korean State Railway (since 1945)
- Locale: North Hamgyŏng
- Termini: Kangalli; Sŏngp'yŏng
- Stations: 2

Service
- Type: Heavy rail, Freight rail Regional rail

History
- Opened: 1924
- Closed: ?

Technical
- Line length: 11.5 km (7.1 mi)
- Number of tracks: Single track
- Track gauge: 1,435 mm (4 ft 8 1/2 in) standard gauge

- Songpyong Line
- Hangul: 성평선
- Hanja: 城坪線
- RR: Seongpyeongseon
- MR: Sŏngp'yŏngsŏn

The Sŏngp'yŏng Line was a non-electrified 11.5 km (7.1 mi) long railway line of the Korean State Railway in North Korea, connecting Kangalli on the Hambuk Line with Sŏngp'yŏng.

== History ==
The line was originally opened by the privately owned Tomun Railway as a branch of its Hoeryŏng−Tonggwanjin mainline, subsequently becoming part of the Chosen Government Railway after the nationalisation of the Tomun Railway in 1929. The line was dismantled sometime after the mid 1980s, but the exact date of closure is unknown.

== Services ==
Until the 1980s, coal was shipped from mines on this line to the Kim Chaek Iron & Steel Complex at Kimchaek and the Ch'ŏngjin Steel Works in Ch'ŏngjin, with the order of collection from each line arranged in the order of the total weight of the outbound cars.

== Route ==
A yellow background in the "Distance" box indicates that section of the line is not electrified.

Distance (km)		Station Name		Former Name		
Total	S2S	Transcribed	Chosŏn'gŭl (Hanja)	Transcribed	Chosŏn'gŭl (Hanja)	Connections
0.0	0.0	Kangalli	강안리 (江岸里)	Tonggwan	동관 (東關)	Hambuk Line
		Namju-dong	남주동 (南州洞)			Closed.
~~11.5~~	~~11.5~~	Sŏngp'yŏng	성평 (城坪)			Closed.
