= Tongpo Line =

Railway line in North Korea

Tongp'o Line

Overview
- Native name: 동포선 (東浦線)
- Status: Closed
- Owner: Tomun Railway (1924–1929); Chosen Government Railway (1929–1934); South Manchuria Railway (1934–1945); Korean State Railway (since 1945)
- Locale: North Hamgyŏng
- Termini: Chongsŏng; Tongp'o
- Stations: 2

Service
- Type: Heavy rail, Freight rail Regional rail

History
- Opened: 1 November 1924
- Closed: ?

Technical
- Line length: 15.6 km (9.7 mi)
- Number of tracks: Single track
- Track gauge: 1,435 mm (4 ft 8 1/2 in) standard gauge

- Tongpo Line
- Hangul: 동포선
- Hanja: 東浦線
- RR: Dongposeon
- MR: Tongp'osŏn

The Tongp'o Line was a non-electrified 15.6 km (9.7 mi) long railway line of the Korean State Railway in North Korea, connecting Chongsŏng on the Hambuk Line with Tongp'o.

== History ==
It was originally opened by the Tomun Railway together with the Sangsambong−Chongsŏng section of the West Tomun Line on 1 November 1924. It was subsequently nationalised by the Chosen Government Railway in 1929, and from 1934 to 1945 it was managed by the South Manchuria Railway. Finally, after the partition of Korea it became part of the Korean State Railway. The date of closure is not known.

== Services ==
Coal was shipped from mines on this line to the Kim Chaek Iron & Steel Complex at Kimchaek and the Ch'ŏngjin Steel Works in Ch'ŏngjin, with the order of collection from each line arranged in the order of the total weight of the outbound cars.

== Route ==
A yellow background in the "Distance" box indicates that section of the line is not electrified.

Distance (km)		Station Name		Former Name		
Total	S2S	Transcribed	Chosŏn'gŭl (Hanja)	Transcribed	Chosŏn'gŭl (Hanja)	Connections
0.0	0.0	Chongsŏng	종성 (鍾城)			Hambuk Line
~~15.6~~	~~15.6~~	Tongp'o	동포 (東浦)			Closed.
