= Sechon Line =

Railway line in North Korea

Sech'ŏn Line

Overview
- Native name: 세천선 (細川線)
- Status: Operational
- Owner: Tomun Railway (1920–1929); Chosen Government Railway (1929-1934); South Manchuria Railway (1934-1940); Chosen Government Railway (1940-1945); Korean State Railway (since 1945)
- Locale: North Hamgyŏng
- Termini: Sinhakp'o; Chungbong
- Stations: 3

Service
- Type: Heavy rail, Freight rail Regional rail

History
- Opened: 1920

Technical
- Line length: 14.4 km (8.9 mi)
- Number of tracks: Single track
- Track gauge: 1,435 mm (4 ft 8 1/2 in) standard gauge
- Electrification: 3000 V DC

- Sechon Line
- Hangul: 세천선
- Hanja: 細川線
- RR: Secheonseon
- MR: Sech'ŏnsŏn

The Sech'ŏn Line is an electrified 14.4 km (8.9 mi) long railway line of the Korean State Railway in North Korea, connecting Sinhakpo on the Hambuk Line with Chungbong.

== History ==
The line was opened in 1920 by the privately owned Tomun Railway, at the same time as the rest of the first stage of its mainline, from Hoeryŏng to Sangsambong. It was subsequently nationalised by the Chosen Government Railway in 1929, and from 1934 to 1940 it was managed by the South Manchuria Railway. Finally, after the partition of Korea it became part of the Korean State Railway.

== Services ==
Coal is shipped from mines on this line to the Kim Chaek Iron & Steel Complex at Kimchaek and the Ch'ŏngjin Steel Works in Ch'ŏngjin, and there are commuter trains that operate between Hoeryŏng and Sech'ŏn via Sinhakp'o.

== Route ==
A yellow background in the "Distance" box indicates that section of the line is not electrified.

Distance (km)		Station Name		Former Name		
Total	S2S	Transcribed	Chosŏn'gŭl (Hanja)	Transcribed	Chosŏn'gŭl (Hanja)	Connections
0.0	0.0	Sinhakp'o	신학포 (新鶴浦)			Hambuk Line
8.6	8.6	Sech'ŏn	세천 (細川)			
14.4	5.8	Chungbong	중봉 (仲峰)			
