= Tongpo station =

Railway station on Hambuk Line, North Korea

Tongp'o 동포

Korean name
- Hangul: 동포역
- Hanja: 東浦驛
- Revised Romanization: Dongpo-yeok
- McCune–Reischauer: Tongp'o-yŏk

General information
- Location: Tongp'o-rodongjagu, Hoeryŏng, North Hamgyŏng; North Korea
- Owner: Korean State Railway
- Line: Hambuk Line

History
- Opened: 1922
- Original company: Tomun Railway

Services
Preceding station	Korean State Railway	Following station
Chongsŏng Terminus	Tongp'o Line	Terminus
Location

Tongp'o station is a railway station in Sech'ŏn-dong, Hoeryŏng county, North Hamgyŏng province, North Korea on the Sech'ŏn branch of the Hambuk Line of the Korean State Railway.

The station was opened in 1922 by the privately owned Tomun Railway Company, at the same time as the rest of the second stage of its mainline, from Sangsambong to Chongsŏng Station. It was subsequently nationalised by the Chosen Government Railway in 1929, and from 1934 to 1940 it was managed by the South Manchuria Railway. Finally, after the partition of Korea it became part of the Korean State Railway.
