= Chungbong station =

Railway station in North Korea

Chungbong 중봉

Korean name
- Hangul: 중봉역
- Hanja: 仲峰驛
- Revised Romanization: Jungbong-yeok
- McCune–Reischauer: Chungbong-yŏk

General information
- Location: Chungbong-dong, Hoeryŏng, North Hamgyŏng; North Korea
- Coordinates: 42.5855°N 129.8860°E
- Owner: Korean State Railway
- Line: Sech'ŏn Line

History
- Opened: 1920
- Original company: Tomun Railway

Services
Preceding station	Korean State Railway	Following station
Terminus	Sech'ŏn Line	Sech'ŏn towards Sinhakp'o
Location

Chungbong station is a railway station in Chungbong-dong, Hoeryŏng county, North Hamgyŏng province, North Korea. It is the terminus of the Sech'ŏn branch of the Hambuk Line of the Korean State Railway.

The station was opened in 1920 by the privately owned Tomun Railway Company, at the same time as the rest of the first stage of its mainline, from Hoeryŏng to Sangsambong. It was subsequently nationalised by the Chosen Government Railway in 1929, and from 1934 to 1940 it was managed by the South Manchuria Railway. Finally, after the partition of Korea it became part of the Korean State Railway. The station is part of the complex of the former Hoeryong concentration camp.

== See also ==
- Hoeryong concentration camp
