= Sinhakpo station =

Railway station in North Korea

Sinhakp'o 신학포

Korean name
- Hangul: 신학포역
- Hanja: 新鶴浦驛
- Revised Romanization: Sinhakpo-yeok
- McCune–Reischauer: Sinhakp'o-yŏk

General information
- Location: Hakp'o-ri, Hoeryŏng, North Hamgyŏng; North Korea
- Coordinates: 42.5748°N 129.7392°E
- Owner: Korean State Railway
- Lines: Hambuk Line; Sech'ŏn Line

History
- Opened: 1920
- Original company: Tomun Railway

Services
Preceding station	Korean State Railway	Following station
Sech'ŏn towards Chungbong	Sech'ŏn Line	Terminus
Hakp'o towards Rajin	Hambuk Line	Koryŏngjin towards Ch'ŏngjin Ch'ŏngnyŏn
Location

Sinhakp'o station is a railway station in Hakp'o-ri, Hoeryŏng county, North Hamgyŏng province, North Korea. It is the starting point of the Sechŏn branch Hambuk Line of the Korean State Railway to Chungbong station.

The station was opened in 1920 by the privately owned Tomun Railway, at the same time as the rest of the first stage of its mainline, from Hoeryŏng to Sangsambong. It was subsequently nationalised by the Chosen Government Railway in 1929, and from 1934 to 1940 it was managed by the South Manchuria Railway. Finally, after the partition of Korea it became part of the Korean State Railway.
