= Sechon station =

Railway station in North Korea

Sech'ŏn 세천

Korean name
- Hangul: 세천역
- Hanja: 細川驛
- Revised Romanization: Secheon-yeok
- McCune–Reischauer: Sech'ŏn-yŏk

General information
- Location: Sech'ŏn-dong, Hoeryŏng, North Hamgyŏng; North Korea
- Coordinates: 42.5775°N 129.8296°E
- Owner: Korean State Railway
- Line: Sech'ŏn

History
- Opened: 1920
- Original company: Tomun Railway

Services
Preceding station	Korean State Railway	Following station
Chungbong Terminus	Sech'ŏn Line	Sinhakp'o Terminus
Location

Sech'ŏn station is a railway station in Sech'ŏn-dong, Hoeryŏng county, North Hamgyŏng province, North Korea on the Sech'ŏn branch of the Hambuk Line of the Korean State Railway.

The station was opened in 1920 by the privately owned Tomun Railway Company, at the same time as the rest of the first stage of its mainline, from Hoeryŏng to Sangsambong. It was subsequently nationalised by the Chosen Government Railway in 1929, and from 1934 to 1940 it was managed by the South Manchuria Railway. Finally, after the partition of Korea it became part of the Korean State Railway.
