= Hoeryong Tangwang Line =

Railway line in North Korea

Hoeryŏng Colliery Line
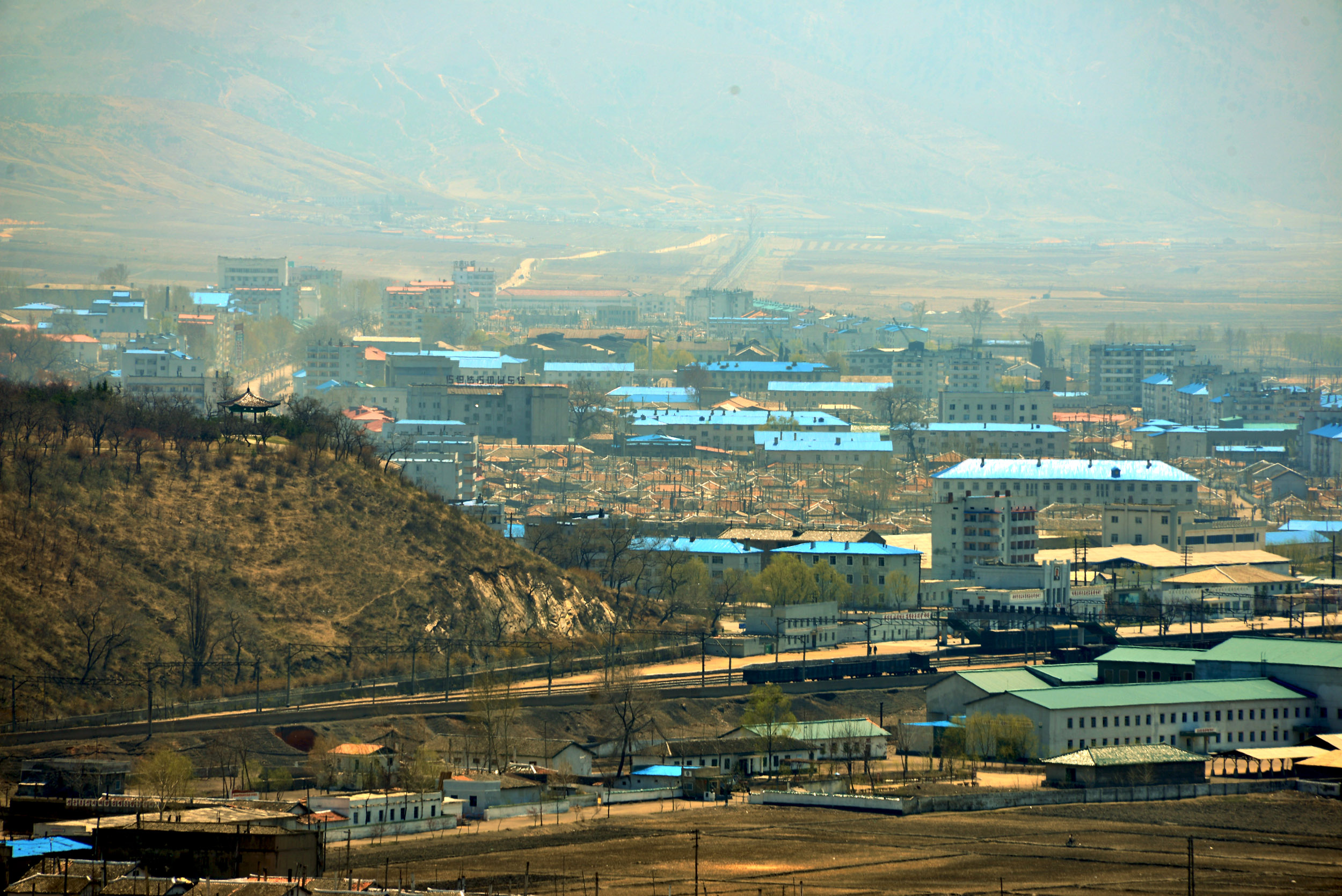
- Hoeryŏng Ch'ŏngnyŏn Station

Overview
- Native name: 회령탄광선(會寧炭鑛線)
- Status: Operational
- Owner: Tomun Railway (1928–1929); Chosen Government Railway (1929–1933); South Manchuria Railway (1933–1940); Chosen Government Railway (1940–1945); Korean State Railway (since 1945)
- Locale: Hoeryŏng-si, North Hamgyŏng
- Termini: Hoeryŏng Ch'ŏngnyŏn; Yusŏn
- Stations: 2 (formerly 5)

Service
- Type: Heavy rail, Freight rail

History
- Opened: 11 August 1928

Technical
- Line length: 10.6 km (6.6 mi)
- Number of tracks: Single track
- Track gauge: 1,435 mm (4 ft 8 1/2 in) standard gauge
Route map
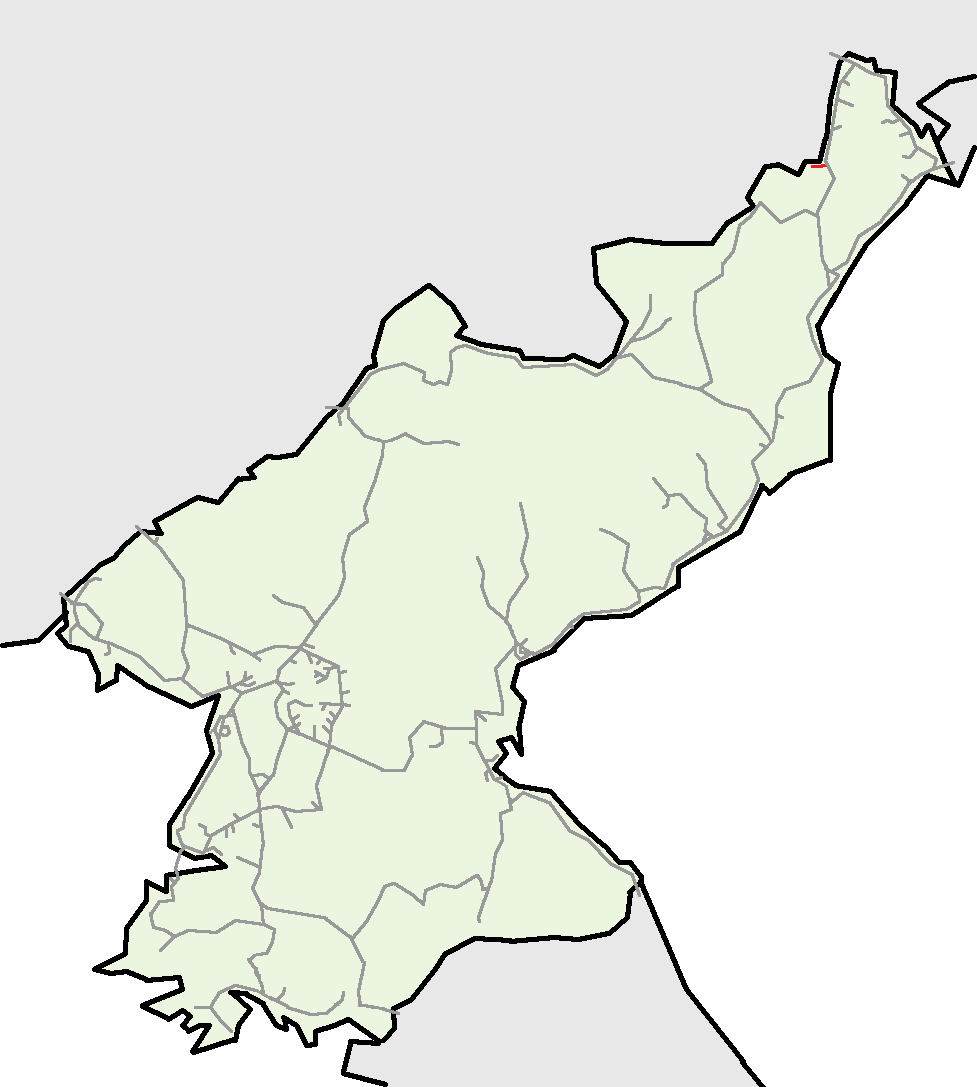

- Hoeryong Tangwang Line
- Chosŏn'gŭl: 회령탄광선
- Hancha: 會寧炭鑛線
- Revised Romanization: Hoeryeongtangwang-seon
- McCune–Reischauer: Hoeryŏngt'an'gwang-sŏn

The Hoeryŏng T'an'gwang Line (Hoeryŏng Colliery Line) is a non-electrified standard-gauge freight-only secondary line of the Korean State Railway in North Korea, running from Hoeryŏng Ch'ŏngnyŏn on the Hambuk Line to Yusŏn.

== History ==
The Tomun Railway, which had completed its mainline from Hoeryŏng to Tonggwanjin on 1 November 1924, expanded its network in order to serve the collieries around Hoeryŏng by building a 10.6 km (6.6 mi) branchline from Hoeryŏng to Kyerim, which was opened for service on 11 August 1928.

Less than a year later, on 1 April 1929 the Tomun Railway was nationalised and absorbed by the Chosen Government Railway (Sentetsu). Sentetsu continued to operate the line, and then further expanded it with the addition of a 1.1 km (0.68 mi) extension to Singyerim; this extension was opened on 21 December 1932, but was subsequently closed.

The line has changed hands several times since its construction. Following the absorption of the Tomun Railway by Sentetsu in 1929, on 1 October 1933 the Hoeryŏng Colliery Line, along with the rest of Sentetsu's Tomun Line to Unggi, were transferred to the South Manchuria Railway (Mantetsu). Mantetsu took over the management, operation and maintenance of these lines, until finally on 1 July 1940 it was transferred back to Sentetsu.

Following the partition of Korea, all railways located in the Soviet zone of occupation, including the Hoeryŏng Colliery Line, were nationalised by the Provisional People’s Committee for North Korea on 10 August 1946, and following the establishment of North Korea, the Korean State Railway was created. At some point, the stations at Yŏngsu and Pongŭi were closed, and Kyerim station was renamed Yusŏn.

== Services ==
Coal is shipped from mines on this line to the Kim Chaek Iron & Steel Complex at Kimchaek and the Ch'ŏngjin Steel Works in Ch'ŏngjin, with the order of collection from each line arranged in the order of the total weight of the outbound cars. This line also serves the Hoeryŏng Tobacco Factory located near the former station of Yŏngsu.

== Route ==
A yellow background in the "Distance" box indicates that section of the line is not electrified.

Distance (km)		Station Name		Former Name		
Total	S2S	Transcribed	Chosŏn'gŭl (Hanja)	Transcribed	Chosŏn'gŭl (Hanja)	Connections
0.0	0.0	Hoeryŏng Ch'ŏngnyŏn	회령청년 (會寧靑年)	Hoeryŏng	회령 (會寧)	Hambuk Line
~~5.3~~	~~5.3~~	Yŏngsu	영수 (永綏)			Closed.
~~9.2~~	~~3.9~~	Pongŭi	봉의 (鳳儀)			Closed.
10.6	1.4	Yusŏn	유선 (遊仙)	Kyerim	계림 (鷄林)	
~~11.7~~	~~1.1~~	Singyerim	신계림 (新鷄林)			Closed.
