= Kangyang station =

Railway station in North Korea

Kangyang 강양
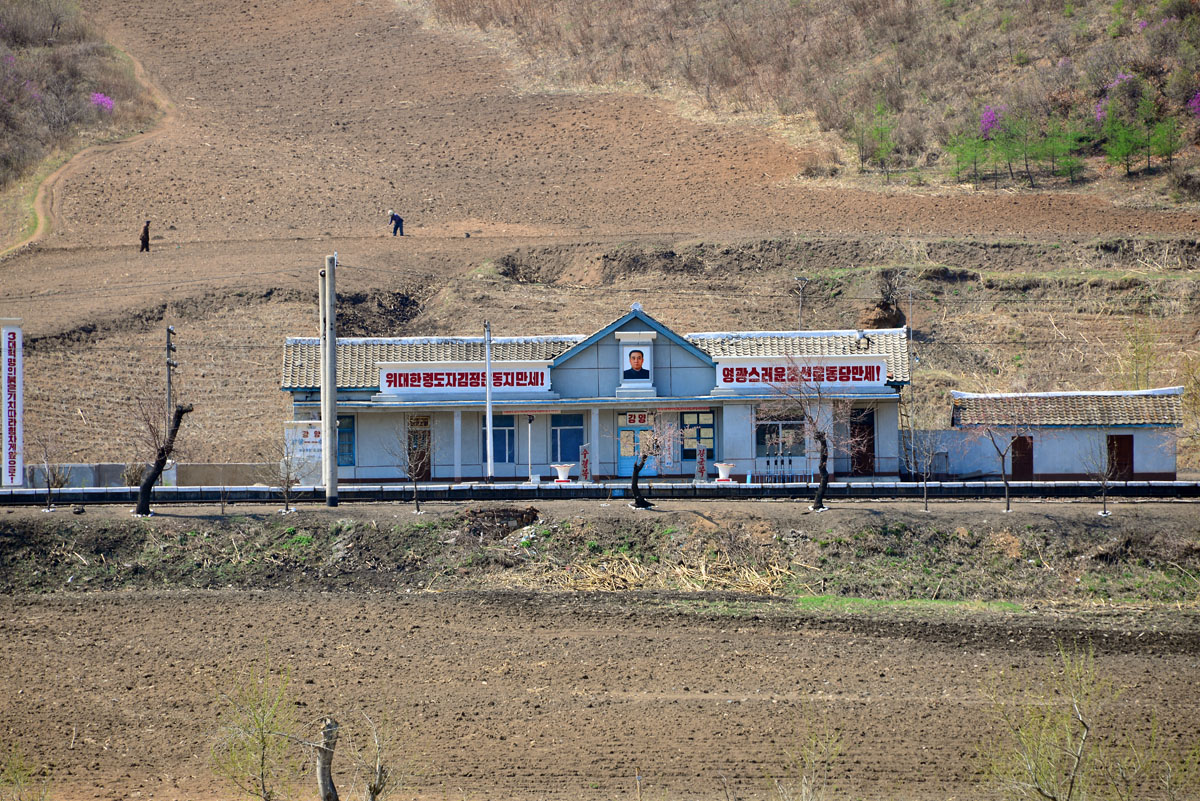
- Kangyang station

Korean name
- Hangul: 강양역
- Hanja: 江陽驛
- Revised Romanization: Gangyang-yeok
- McCune–Reischauer: Kangyang-yŏk

General information
- Location: Onsŏng, North Hamgyŏng; North Korea
- Coordinates: 42.9189°N 129.8525°E
- Owner: Korean State Railway

History
- Opened: 1 August 1933

Services
Preceding station	Korean State Railway	Following station
Namyang towards Rajin	Hambuk Line	Sugup'o towards Ch'ŏngjin Ch'ŏngnyŏn
Location

Kangyang station is a railway station in Onsŏng County, North Hamgyŏng, North Korea, on the Hambuk Line of the Korean State Railway.

== History ==
It was opened by the Chosen Government Railway on 1 August 1933, together with the rest of the Tonggwanjin-Namyang section of the former East Tomun Line (Tonggwanjin-Unggi).
