= Qinglong Manchu Autonomous County =

Qinglong County 青龙县 ᠨᡳᠣᠸᠠᠩᡤᡳᠶᠠᠨ ᡥᡳᠶᠠᠨ
- Autonomous county
- 青龙满族自治县 • ᠨᡳᠣᠸᠠᠩᡤᡳᠶᠠᠨ ᠮᡠᡩᡠᡵᡳ ᠮᠠᠨᠵᡠ ᡠᡴᠰᡠᡵᠠ ᡯᡳᡷᠶ ᡥᡳᠶᠠᠨ; Qinglong Manchu Autonomous County
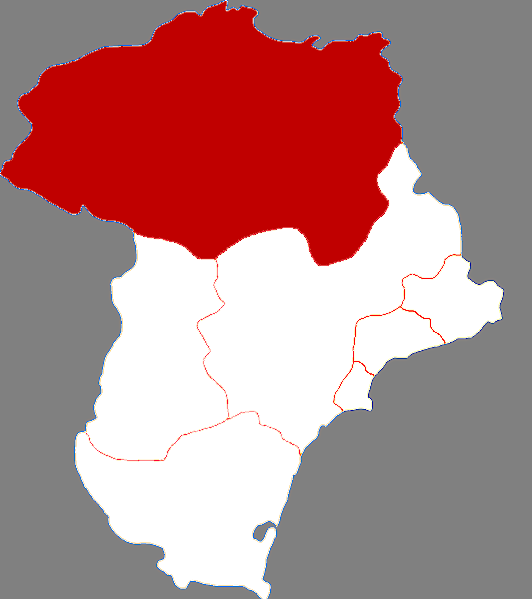
- Qinglong in Qinhuangdao

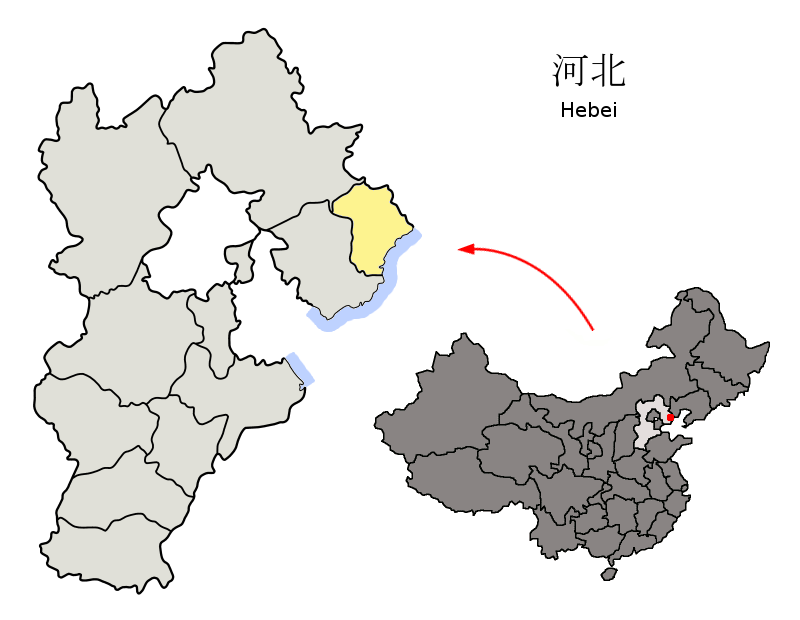
- Qinhuangdao in Hebei
- Coordinates: 40°24′27″N 118°56′59″E
- Country: China
- Province: Hebei
- Prefecture-level city: Qinhuangdao
- County seat: Qinglong Town

Area
  - Total: 3,309 km^{2} (1,278 sq mi)
- Elevation: 239 m (784 ft)

Population (2020 census)
  - Total: 431,138
  - Density: 130.3/km^{2} (337.5/sq mi)
- Time zone: UTC+8 (China Standard)
- Postal code: 066500
- Area code: +86 335
- Website: www.chinaqinglong.gov.cn

Qinglong Manchu Autonomous County

Chinese name
- Simplified Chinese: 青龙满族自治县
- Traditional Chinese: 青龍滿族自治縣
- Literal meaning: Blue (or teal) Dragon Manchu-ethnicity Autonomous County
Transcriptions
Standard Mandarin
- Hanyu Pinyin: Qīnglóng Mǎnzú Zìzhìxiàn

Manchu name
- Manchu script: ᠨᡳᠣᠸᠠᠩᡤᡳᠶᠠᠨ ᠮᡠᡩᡠᡵᡳ ᠮᠠᠨᠵᡠ ᡠᡴᠰᡠᡵᠠ ᡯᡳᡷᠶ ᡥᡳᠶᠠᠨ
- Möllendorff: niowanggiyan muduri manju uksura dzijy hiyan

Qinglong Manchu Autonomous County (Chinese: 青龙满族自治县, Manchu: ᠨᡳᠣᠸᠠᠩᡤᡳᠶᠠᠨ ᠮᡠᡩᡠᡵᡳ ᠮᠠᠨᠵᡠ ᡠᡴᠰᡠᡵᠠ ᡯᡳᡷᠶ ᡥᡳᠶᠠᠨ) is a Manchu autonomous county in northeastern Hebei province, China, bordering Liaoning Province to the north and east and located in the eastern part of the Yan Mountains. It is under the administration of the prefecture-level city of Qinhuangdao, and, as of 2004, had a population of 520,000 residing in an area of 3,309 km^{2} (1,278 sq mi). Bordering county-level divisions are: Lingyuan and Jianchang County (Liaoning) to the north, Liaoning's Suizhong County and Qinhuangdao city proper to the east, Qian'an and Lulong County to the south, and Kuancheng Manchu Autonomous County and Qianxi County to the west.

During the 1976 Tangshan earthquake 180,000 buildings in Qinglong collapsed, but no fatalities occurred.

== Administrative divisions ==
Qinglong administers 1 subdistrict, 11 towns and 14 townships:

Name	Simplified Chinese	Hanyu Pinyin	Manchu	Möllendorff
Subdistricts
Duyanglu Subdistrict	都阳路街道	Duyánglù Jiēdào	ᡩᡠ ᠶᠠᠩ ᠯᡠ ᠵᡠᡤᡡᠨ ᡤᡳᠶᠠ	du yang lu jugūn giya
Towns
Qinglong Town	青龙镇	Qīnglóng Zhèn	ᠨᡳᠣᠸᠠᠩᡤᡳᠶᠠᠨ ᠮᡠᡩᡠᡵᡳ ᡴᠠᡩᠠᠯᠠᠩᡤᠠ	niowanggiyan muduri kadalangga
Zushan Town	祖山镇	Zǔshān Zhèn	ᡯᡠ ᠰᡥᠠᠨ ᡴᠠᡩᠠᠯᠠᠩᡤᠠ	dzu shan kadalangga
Mutoudeng Town	木头凳镇	Mùtóudèng Zhèn	ᠮᡠ ᡨᠣᡡ ᡩᡝᠩ ᡴᠠᡩᠠᠯᠠᠩᡤᠠ	mu toū deng kadalangga
Shuangshanzi Town	双山子镇	Shuāngshānzǐ Zhèn	ᠰᡥᡠᠠᠩᠰᡥᠠᠨᡯᡳ ᡴᠠᡩᠠᠯᠠᠩᡤᠠ	šuangšandzi kadalangga
Maquanzi Town	马圈子镇	Mǎquānzǐ Zhèn	ᠮᠠᠴᡠᠠᠨᡯᡳ ᡴᠠᡩᠠᠯᠠᠩᡤᠠ	macuandzi kadalangga
Xiaoyingzi Town	肖营子镇	Xiāoyíngzǐ Zhèn	ᠰᡥᡳᠠᡡᠶᡳᠩᡯᡳ ᡴᠠᡩᠠᠯᠠᠩᡤᠠ	shiaūyingdzi kadalangga
Dawulan Town	大巫岚镇	Dàwūlán Zhèn	ᡩᠠ ᠸᡠ ᠯᠠᠨ ᡴᠠᡩᠠᠯᠠᠩᡤᠠ	da wu lan kadalangga
Tumenzi Town	土门子镇	Tǔménzǐ Zhèn	ᡨᡠᠮᡝᠨᡯᡳ ᡴᠠᡩᠠᠯᠠᠩᡤᠠ	tumendzi kadalangga
Badaohe Town	八道河镇	Bādàohé Zhèn	ᡰᡥᠠᡴᡠᡠᠨ ᡩᠣᡵᠣ ᡴᠠᡩᠠᠯᠠᠩᡤᠠ	rhakuun doro kadalangga
Gehetou Town	隔河头镇	Géhétóu Zhèn	ᡬᡝᡥᡝᡨᠣᡠ ᡴᠠᡩᠠᠯᠠᠩᡤᠠ	gehetou kadalangga
Louzhangzi Town	娄仗子镇	Lóuzhàngzǐ Zhèn	ᠯᠣᡡᡯᡥᠠᠩᡯᡳ ᡴᠠᡩᠠᠯᠠᠩᡤᠠ	loūdzhangdzi kadalangga
Townships
Fenghuangshan Township	凤凰山乡	Fènghuángshān Xiāng	ᡶᡝᠩ ᡥᡠᠠᠩ ᡧᠠᠨ ᡤᠠᡧᠠᠨ	feng huang šan gašan
Longwangmiao Township	龙王庙乡	Lóngwángmiào Xiāng	ᠯᡡᠩ ᠸᠠᠩ ᠮᡳᠠᡡ ᡤᠠᡧᠠᠨ	lūng wang miaū gašan
Sanxingkou Township	三星口乡	Sānxīngkǒu Xiāng	ᠰᠠᠨ ᡧᡳᠩᠺᠣᡡ ᡤᠠᡧᠠᠨ	san šingk‘oū gašan
Gangou Township	干沟乡	Gàngōu Xiāng	ᡤᠠᠨ ᡤᠣᡠ ᡤᠠᡧᠠᠨ	gan gou gašan
Dashiling Township	大石岭乡	Dàshílǐng Xiāng	ᡩᠠᡧᡰᠯᡳᠩ ᡤᠠᡧᠠᠨ	dašžling gašan
Guanchang Township	官场乡	Guānchǎng Xiāng	ᡤᡠᠠᠨ ᡮᠠᠩ ᡤᠠᡧᠠᠨ	guan ts‘ang gašan
Ciyushan Township	茨榆山乡	Cíyúshān Xiāng	ᡮᡰᠶᡠ ᡧᠠᠨ ᡤᠠᡧᠠᠨ	ts‘žyu šan gašan
Pingfangzi Township	平方子乡	Píngfāngzǐ Xiāng	ᡦᡳᠩ ᡶᠠᠩᡯᡳ ᡤᠠᡧᠠᠨ	ping fangdzi gašan
Anziling Township	安子岭乡	Ānzǐlǐng Xiāng	ᠠᠨᡯᡳ ᠯᡳᠩ ᡤᠠᡧᠠᠨ	andzi ling gašan
Zhuzhangzi Township	朱仗子乡	Zhūzhàngzǐ Xiāng	ᠰᡥᡠᡯᡥᠠᠩᡯᡳ ᡤᠠᡧᠠᠨ	shudzhangdzi gašan
Caonian Township	草碾乡	Cǎoniǎn Xiāng	ᡮᠠᡡ ᠨᡳᠠᠨ ᠶᡳᠩᡤᠠᡧᠠᠨ	ts‘aū nian gašan
Qidaohe Township	七道河乡	Qīdàohé Xiāng	ᠴᡳᡩᠠᡡᡥᡝ ᡤᠠᡧᠠᠨ	cidaūhe gašan
Sanbozi Township	三拨子乡	Sānbōzǐ Xiāng	ᠰᠠᠨᠪᠣᡯᡳ ᡤᠠᡧᠠᠨ	sanbodzi gašan
Liangshuihe Township	凉水河乡	Liángshuǐhé Xiāng	ᠯᡳᠠᠩ ᡧᡠᡳ ᡥᡝ ᡤᠠᡧᠠᠨ	liang šui he gašan

== Climate ==
Qinglong has a monsoon-influenced, humid continental climate (Köppen Dwa), with long, cold, and very dry winters, and hot, rainy summers. Spring and autumn are short with some rainfall. The monthly 24-hour average temperature in January is −8.0 °C (17.6 °F), and 24.5 °C (76.1 °F) in July, and the annual mean is 9.6 °C (49.3 °F). The mountainous location means that diurnal temperature variation is rather large, but precipitation is enhanced: the total precipitation is 656.4 millimetres (25.8 in), with close to 60% of it falling in July and August alone.

Climate data for Qinglong, elevation 254 m (833 ft), (1991–2020 normals, extremes 1971–present)
Month	Jan	Feb	Mar	Apr	May	Jun	Jul	Aug	Sep	Oct	Nov	Dec	Year
Record high °C (°F)	13.8 (56.8)	17.4 (63.3)	26.8 (80.2)	31.3 (88.3)	36.6 (97.9)	38.0 (100.4)	39.0 (102.2)	37.5 (99.5)	34.5 (94.1)	30.4 (86.7)	21.7 (71.1)	14.6 (58.3)	39.0 (102.2)
Mean daily maximum °C (°F)	0.3 (32.5)	4.2 (39.6)	10.9 (51.6)	19.1 (66.4)	25.5 (77.9)	28.8 (83.8)	30.1 (86.2)	29.4 (84.9)	25.2 (77.4)	17.9 (64.2)	8.5 (47.3)	1.7 (35.1)	16.8 (62.2)
Daily mean °C (°F)	−7.5 (18.5)	−3.3 (26.1)	4.0 (39.2)	12.3 (54.1)	18.7 (65.7)	22.5 (72.5)	24.8 (76.6)	23.6 (74.5)	18.0 (64.4)	10.1 (50.2)	1.5 (34.7)	−5.4 (22.3)	9.9 (49.9)
Mean daily minimum °C (°F)	−13.0 (8.6)	−9.3 (15.3)	−2.3 (27.9)	5.5 (41.9)	11.5 (52.7)	16.5 (61.7)	20.2 (68.4)	18.9 (66.0)	12.2 (54.0)	4.1 (39.4)	−3.7 (25.3)	−10.5 (13.1)	4.2 (39.5)
Record low °C (°F)	−26.3 (−15.3)	−23.2 (−9.8)	−18.0 (−0.4)	−6.2 (20.8)	1.6 (34.9)	6.1 (43.0)	12.1 (53.8)	9.5 (49.1)	0.1 (32.2)	−8.0 (17.6)	−19.2 (−2.6)	−22.2 (−8.0)	−26.3 (−15.3)
Average precipitation mm (inches)	2.8 (0.11)	3.4 (0.13)	8.7 (0.34)	25.1 (0.99)	49.5 (1.95)	100.6 (3.96)	223.8 (8.81)	151.3 (5.96)	53.6 (2.11)	30.5 (1.20)	11.5 (0.45)	2.6 (0.10)	663.4 (26.11)
Average precipitation days (≥ 0.1 mm)	2.1	2.3	3.5	5.2	7.7	11.3	13.3	10.6	7.3	5.0	3.3	2.1	73.7
Average snowy days	3.0	3.2	2.7	0.8	0	0	0	0	0	0.4	2.7	3.4	16.2
Average relative humidity (%)	51	47	42	44	51	65	77	77	72	65	58	55	59
Mean monthly sunshine hours	204.4	201.3	243.9	250.9	274.9	235.8	193.8	222.6	227.5	219.1	182.6	188.4	2,645.2
Percentage possible sunshine	68	66	65	63	61	53	43	53	62	64	62	66	61
Source 1: China Meteorological Administration October all-time Record
Source 2: Weather China

== See also ==
- Zushan Mountain: Mountain in the Qinglong region
