= Caonian Township =

Caonian Township 草碾乡
- Rural Township
- Cǎoniǎn Xiāng
- Location in Hebei Location in China
- Coordinates: 40°12′11″N 118°58′02″E
- Country: People's Republic of China
- Province: Hebei
- Prefecture-level city: Qinhuangdao
- Autonomous county: Qinglong

Area
  - Total: 217.1 km^{2} (83.8 sq mi)

Population (2010)
  - Total: 8,862
  - Density: 40.83/km^{2} (105.7/sq mi)
- Time zone: UTC+8 (China Standard)

Caonian Township (Chinese: 草碾乡; pinyin: Cǎoniǎn Xiāng) is a rural township located in Qinglong Manchu Autonomous County, Qinhuangdao, Hebei, China. According to the 2010 census, Caonian Township had a population of 8,862, including 4,624 males and 4,238 females. The population was distributed as follows: 1,679 people aged under 14, 6,252 people aged between 15 and 64, and 931 people aged over 65.

== See also ==
- List of township-level divisions of Hebei
