= Fenghuangshan Township =

Fenghuangshan Township 凤凰山乡
- Rural Township
- Fènghuángshān Xiāng
- Location in Hebei Location in China
- Coordinates: 40°19′55″N 119°23′59″E
- Country: People's Republic of China
- Province: Hebei
- Prefecture-level city: Qinhuangdao
- Autonomous county: Qinglong

Area
  - Total: 78.87 km^{2} (30.45 sq mi)

Population (2010)
  - Total: 8,590
  - Density: 108.9/km^{2} (282/sq mi)
- Time zone: UTC+8 (China Standard)

Fenghuangshan Township (Chinese: 凤凰山乡; pinyin: Fènghuángshān Xiāng) is a rural township located in Qinglong Manchu Autonomous County, Qinhuangdao, Hebei, China. According to the 2010 census, Fenghuangshan Township had a population of 8,590, including 4,382 males and 4,208 females. The population was distributed as follows: 1,573 people aged under 14, 6,024 people aged between 15 and 64, and 993 people aged over 65.

== See also ==
- List of township-level divisions of Hebei
