= Zushan Mountain =

Mountain in Hebei, China

- Location within Hebei

Highest point
- Elevation: 1,424 m (4,672 ft)
- Parent peak: Heavenly Goddess Peak (天女峰)
- Coordinates: 40°08′30″N 119°27′05″E

Geography
- Location: Qinglong Manchu Autonomous County, Hebei, China
- Parent range: Yan Mountains

Zushan Mountain (Chinese: 祖山; pinyin: Zǔshān) is a mountain in Qinglong, China. It is around two hours drive from Qinhuangdao in Hebei province. The main peak, the Heavenly Goddess Peak, has an elevation of 1,424 metres (4,672 ft).
