= Ciyushan Township =

Ciyushan Township 茨榆山乡
- Rural Township
- Cíyúshān Xiāng
- Location in Hebei Location in China
- Coordinates: 40°18′21″N 119°08′51″E
- Country: People's Republic of China
- Province: Hebei
- Prefecture-level city: Qinhuangdao
- Autonomous county: Qinglong

Area
  - Total: 126.5 km^{2} (48.8 sq mi)

Population (2010)
  - Total: 17,293
  - Density: 136.6/km^{2} (354/sq mi)
- Time zone: UTC+8 (China Standard)

Ciyushan Township (Chinese: 茨榆山乡; pinyin: Cíyúshān Xiāng) is a rural township located in Qinglong Manchu Autonomous County, Qinhuangdao, Hebei, China. According to the 2010 census, Ciyushan Township had a population of 17,293, including 9,092 males and 8,201 females. The population was distributed as follows: 2,734 people aged under 14, 12,877 people aged between 15 and 64, and 1,682 people aged over 65.

== See also ==
- List of township-level divisions of Hebei
