= BVG Class G =

German U-Bahn train type operated in Berlin

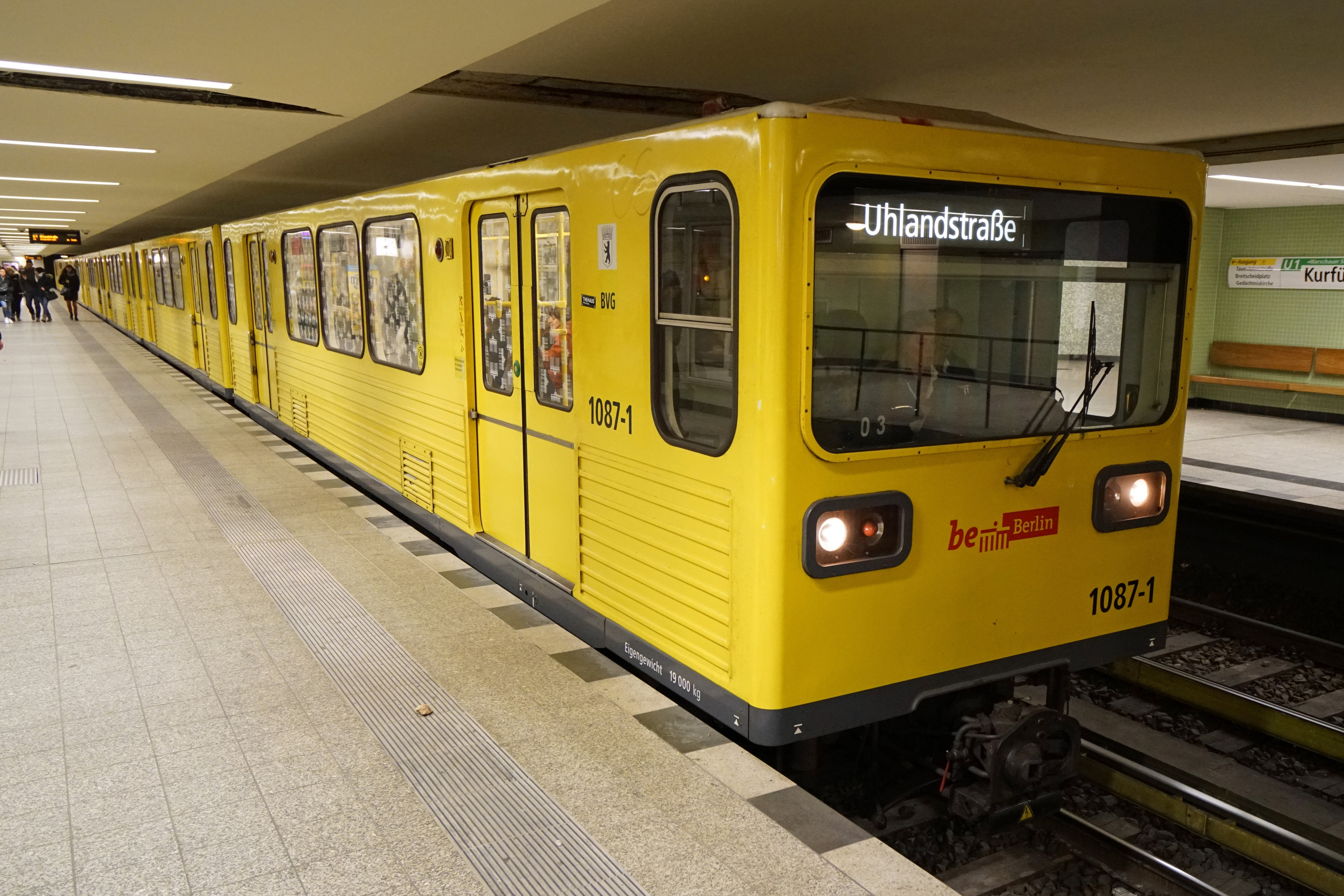
- Class G train at Kurfürstendamm station in February 2017
- In service: 1974–present
- Manufacturer: LEW Hennigsdorf
- Replaced: BVG Class A
- Constructed: 1974–1989
- Refurbished: 2005–2007
- Scrapped: 1997 (prototype cars)
- Formation: 2 cars per set
- Fleet numbers: 1070–1095
- Operators: Berliner Verkehrsbetriebe
- Lines served: U1, U2 & U3

Specifications
- Car body construction: Aluminium
- Train length: 25,660 mm (84 ft 2 1/4 in)
- Width: 2,360 mm (7 ft 8 7/8 in)
- Height: 3,190 mm (10 ft 5 5/8 in)
- Doors: 2 pairs per side (per car)
- Maximum speed: 70 km/h (43 mph)
- Weight: 37 t (36 long tons; 41 short tons)
- Power output: 120 kW per motor
- Acceleration: 1.15 m/s^{2} (3.8 ft/s^{2})
- Deceleration: 1.2 m/s^{2} (3.9 ft/s^{2}) (emergency)
- Electric system(s): 750 V DC third rail
- Current collection: Contact shoe
- Braking system(s): Electric brake, pneumatic brake
- Track gauge: 1,435 mm (4 ft 8 1/2 in)

The Class G is an electric multiple unit train type used on the Berlin U-Bahn. The trains were originally developed for the Berliner Verkehrsbetriebe of East Berlin.

== Specifications ==
=== Formation ===
Each set consists of two cars, only one of which has a driving cab. Thus, the smallest operable formation is a four-car train. Up to four two-car sets can be operated together.

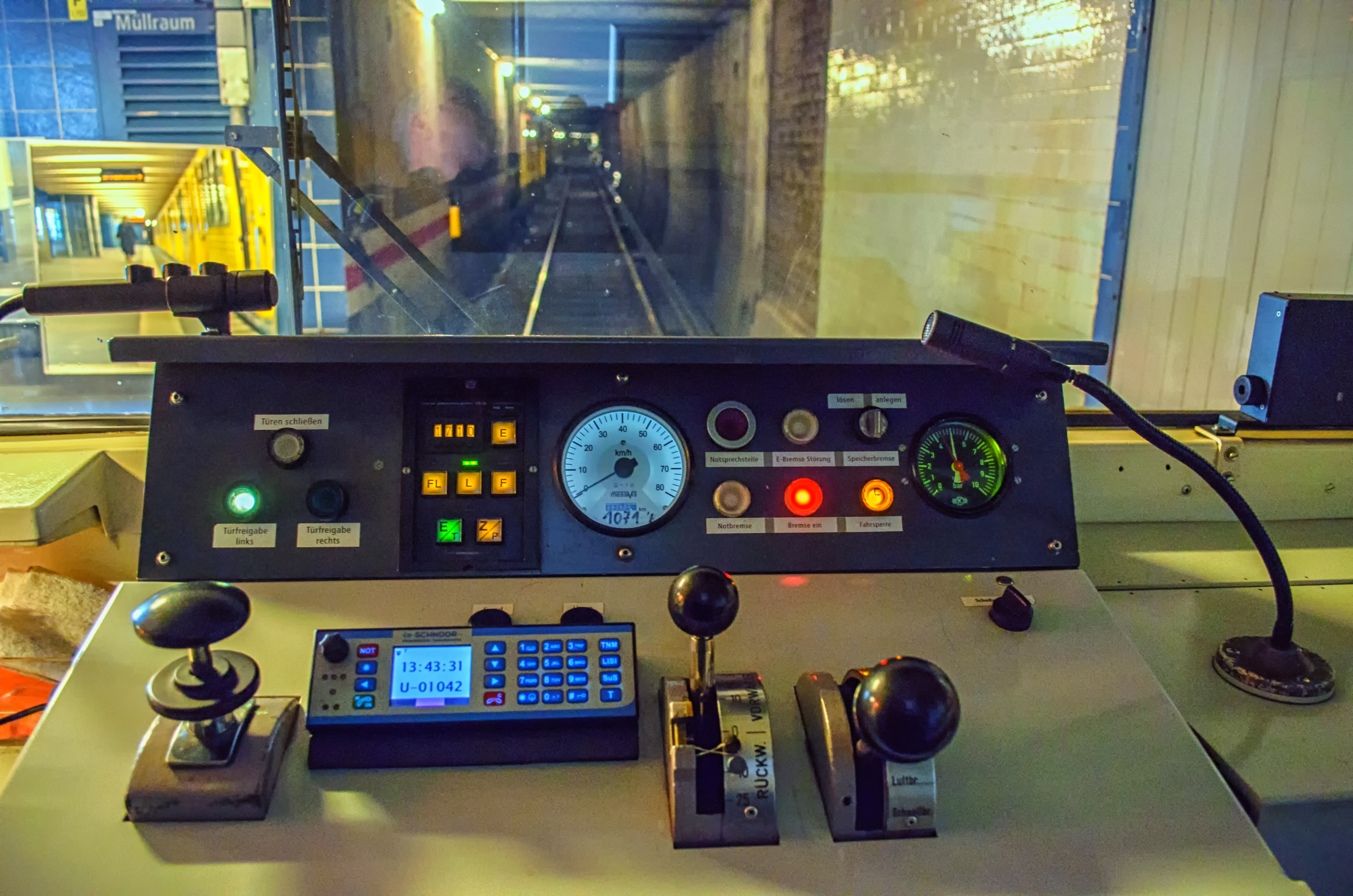
Driver's cab of a GI/1E train, April 2016

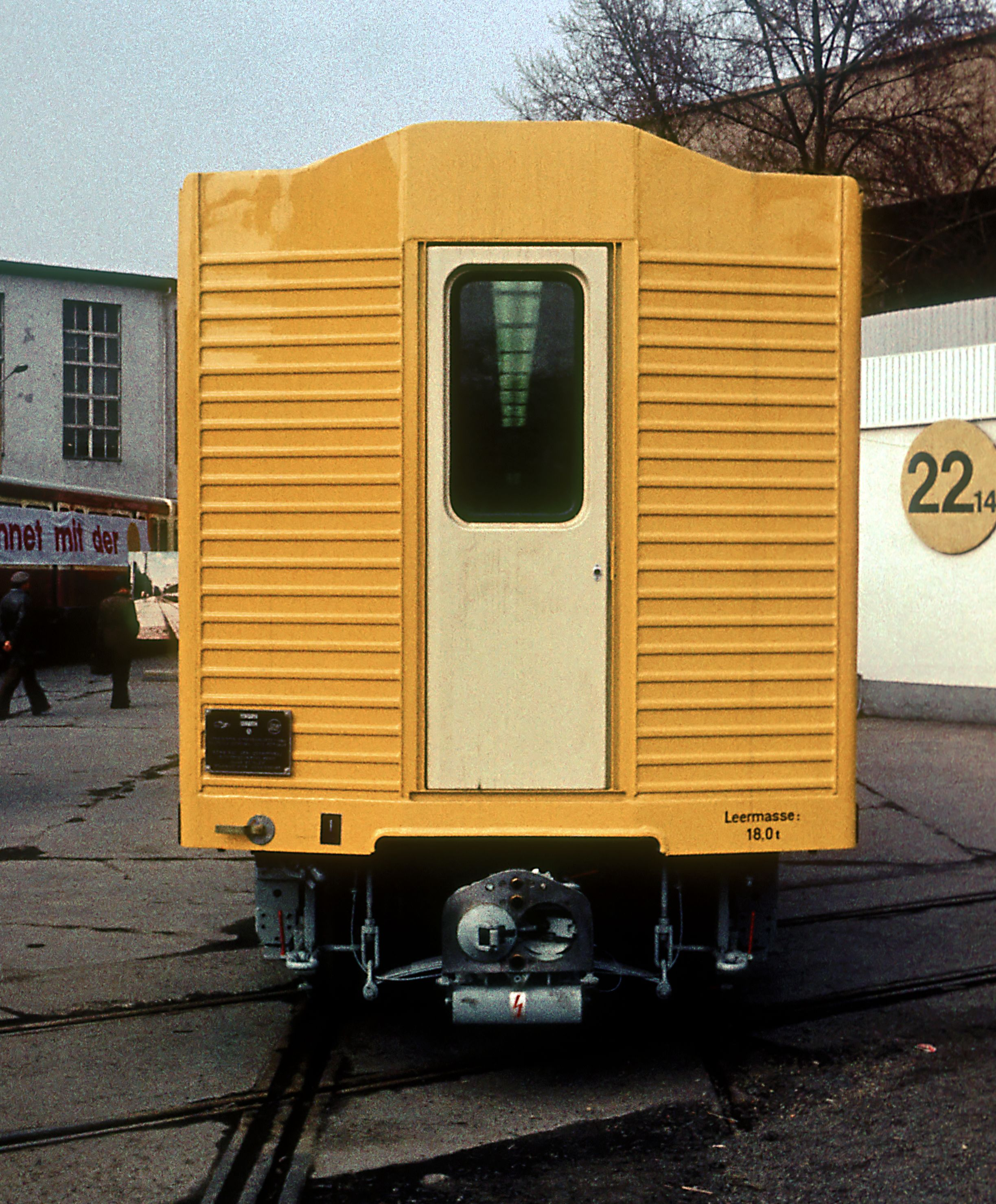
Rear without driver's cab, March 1980

=== Electric systems ===
The trains are powered by one self-ventilated motor per bogie. Both axles are powered by two hollow-shaft gears.

=== Interior ===
The interior features longitudinal seats.

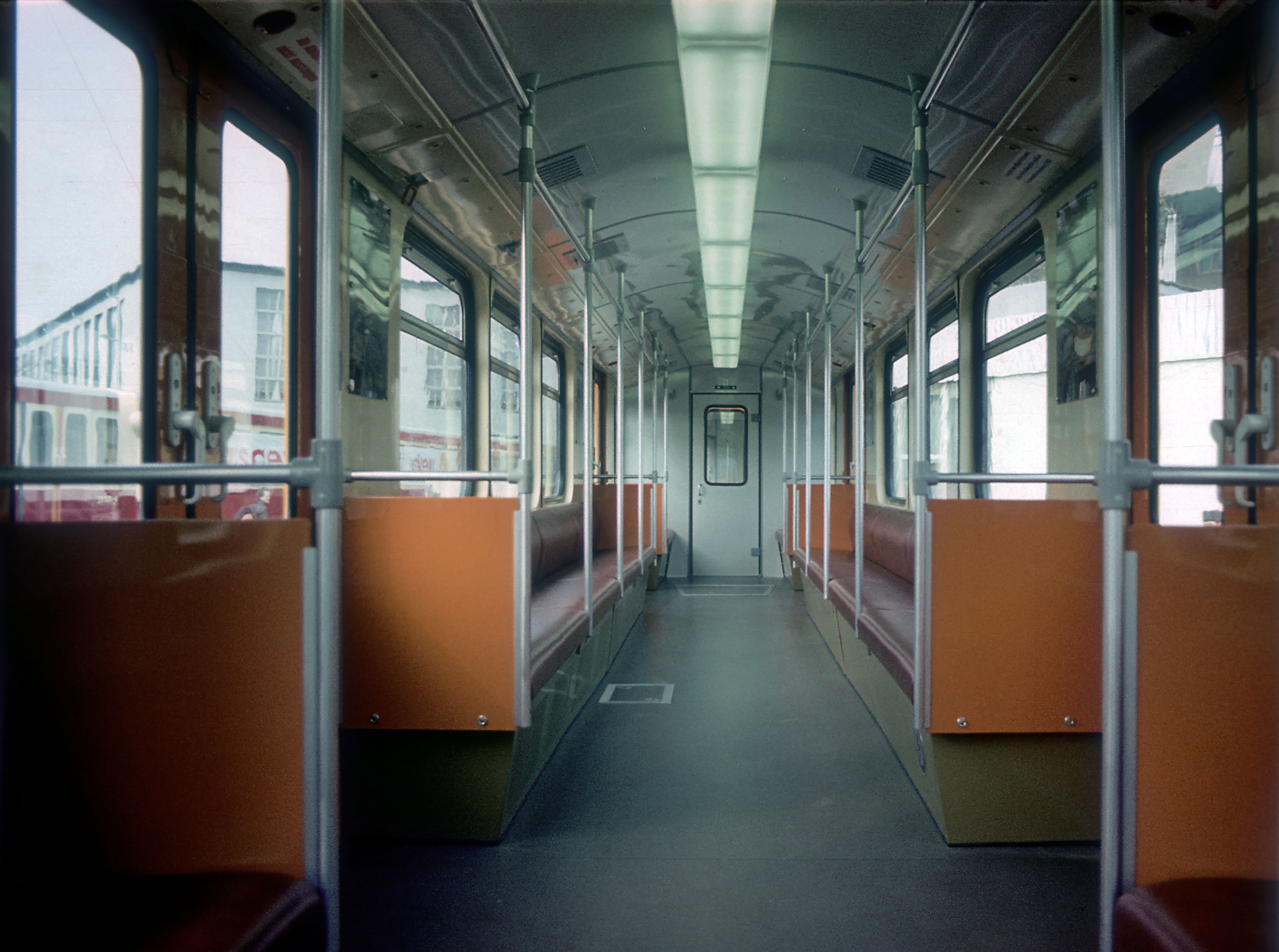
Interior, March 1980

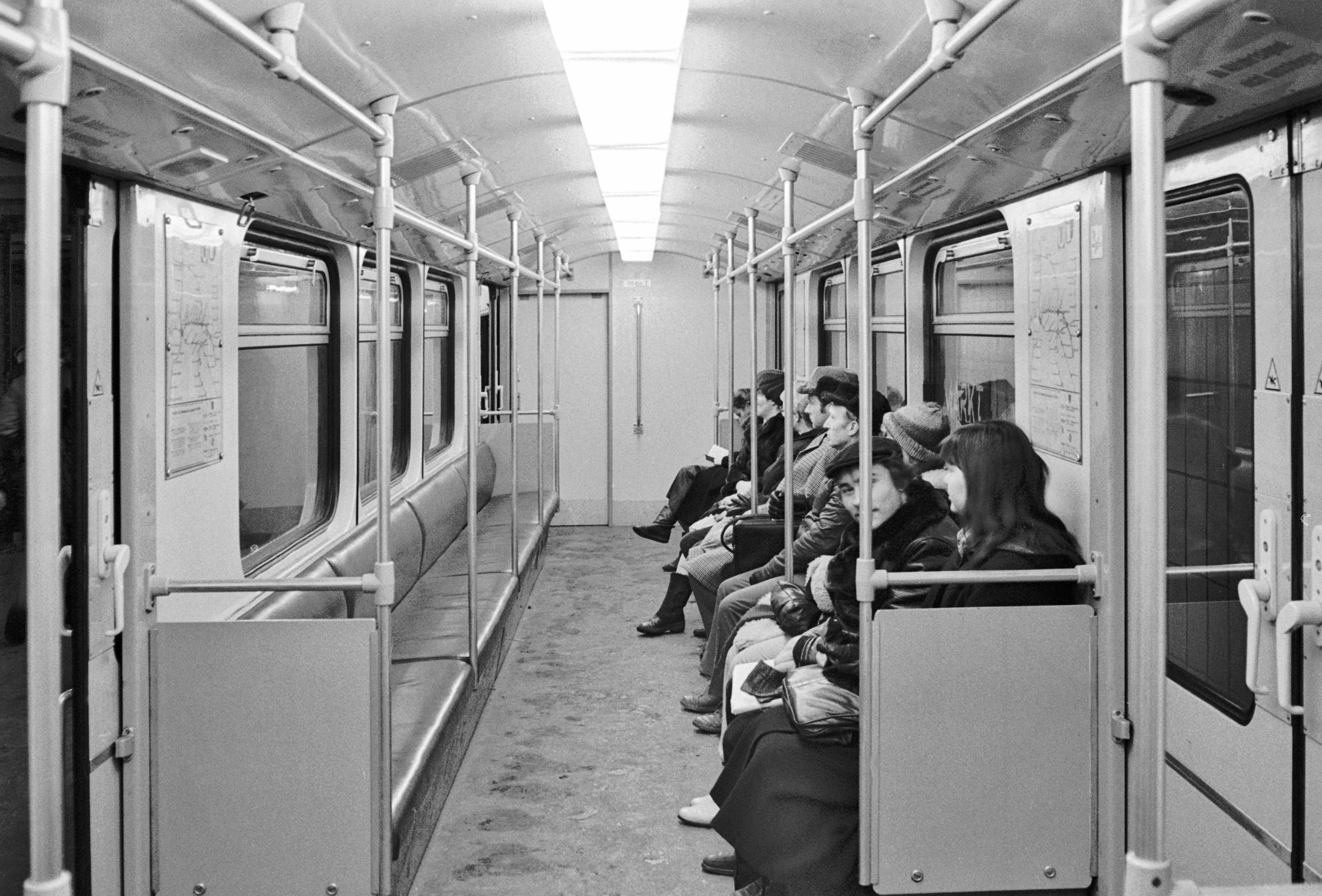
Interior, 1984

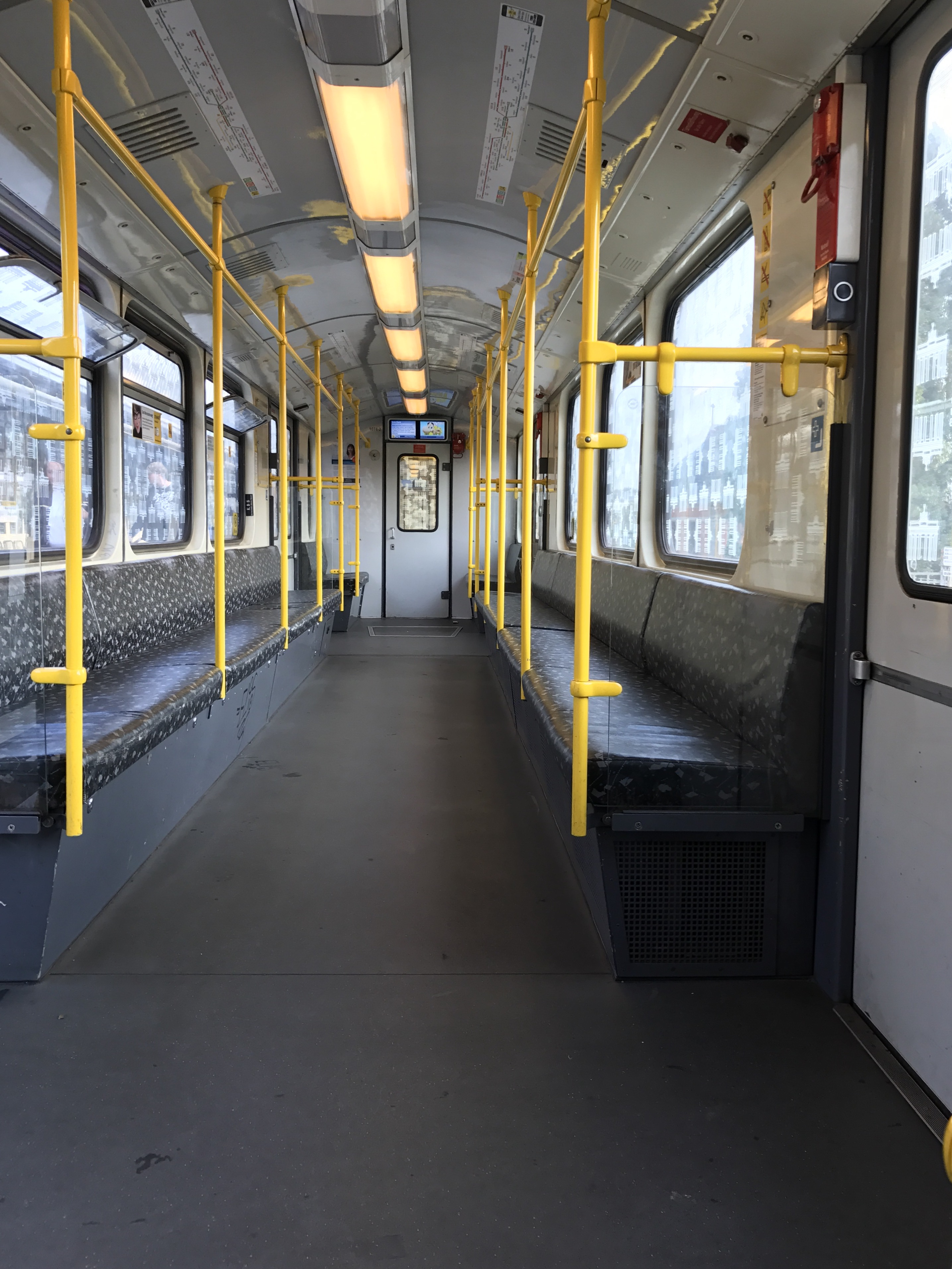
Refurbished interior, September 2016

== History ==
Twelve sets were lent to the Athens Metro between 1983 and 1985. Class GI trains replaced all Class A1 and A2 trains by 5 November 1989. In 1997, 60 sets were sold to the Pyongyang Metro in North Korea.The train received new features over the years. The automatic next station announcements that first appeared on the BVG Class H trains were implemented in the BVG Class G trains in the early 2000s. A twin LCD advisement displays were also added and since the 2010s, the left screen shows next station information. The GI/1 trains were refurbished into GI/1E trains between 2005 and 2007 giving the outside unibody a full paint livery of yellow. The refurbished interior received yellow poles, new seats and the door handles to open the doors were removed and replaced with a button. The interior of the doors was also repainted gray replacing the oak brown color.

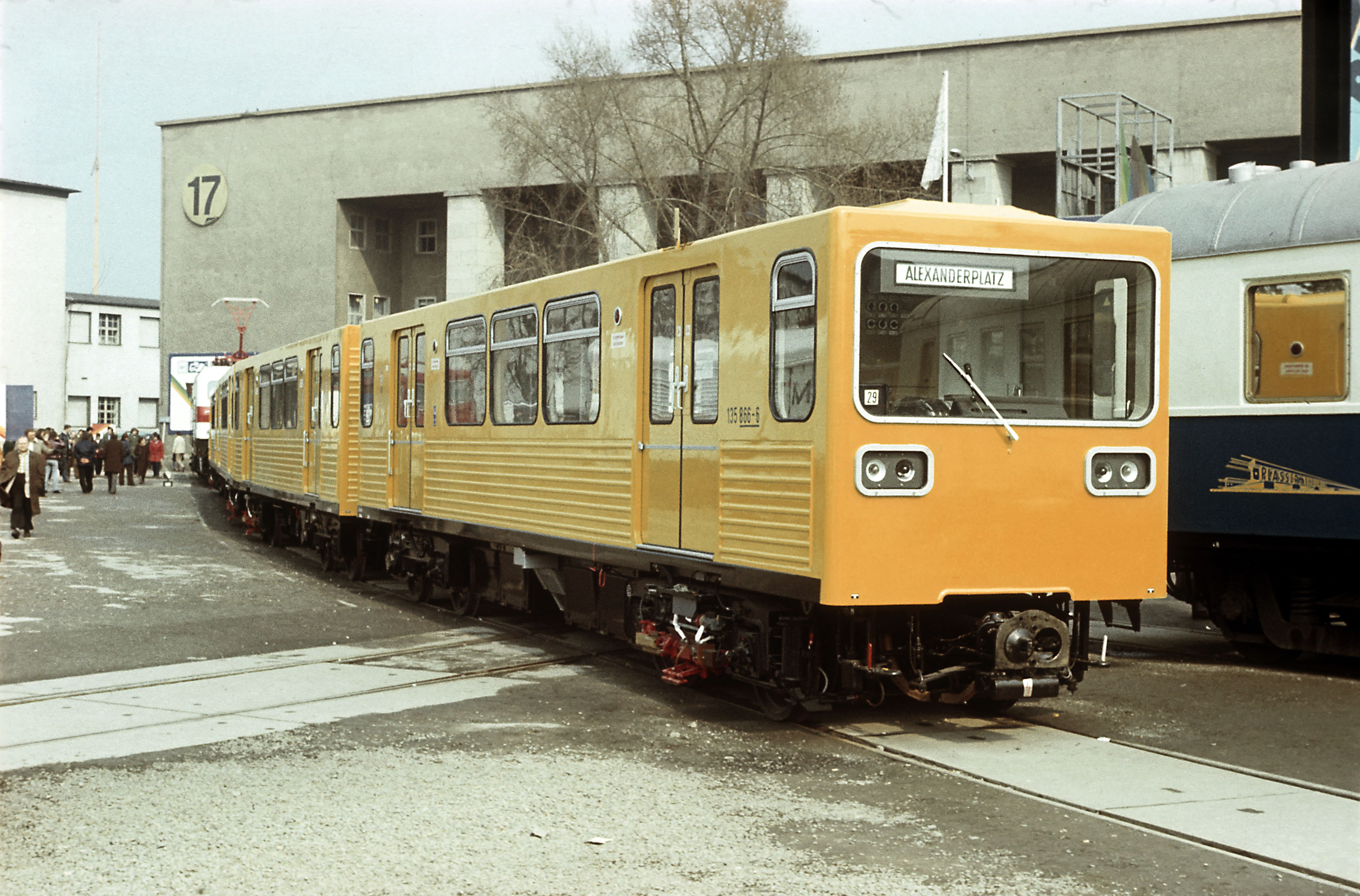
New GI train at the Leipziger Frühjahrsmesse in March 1982

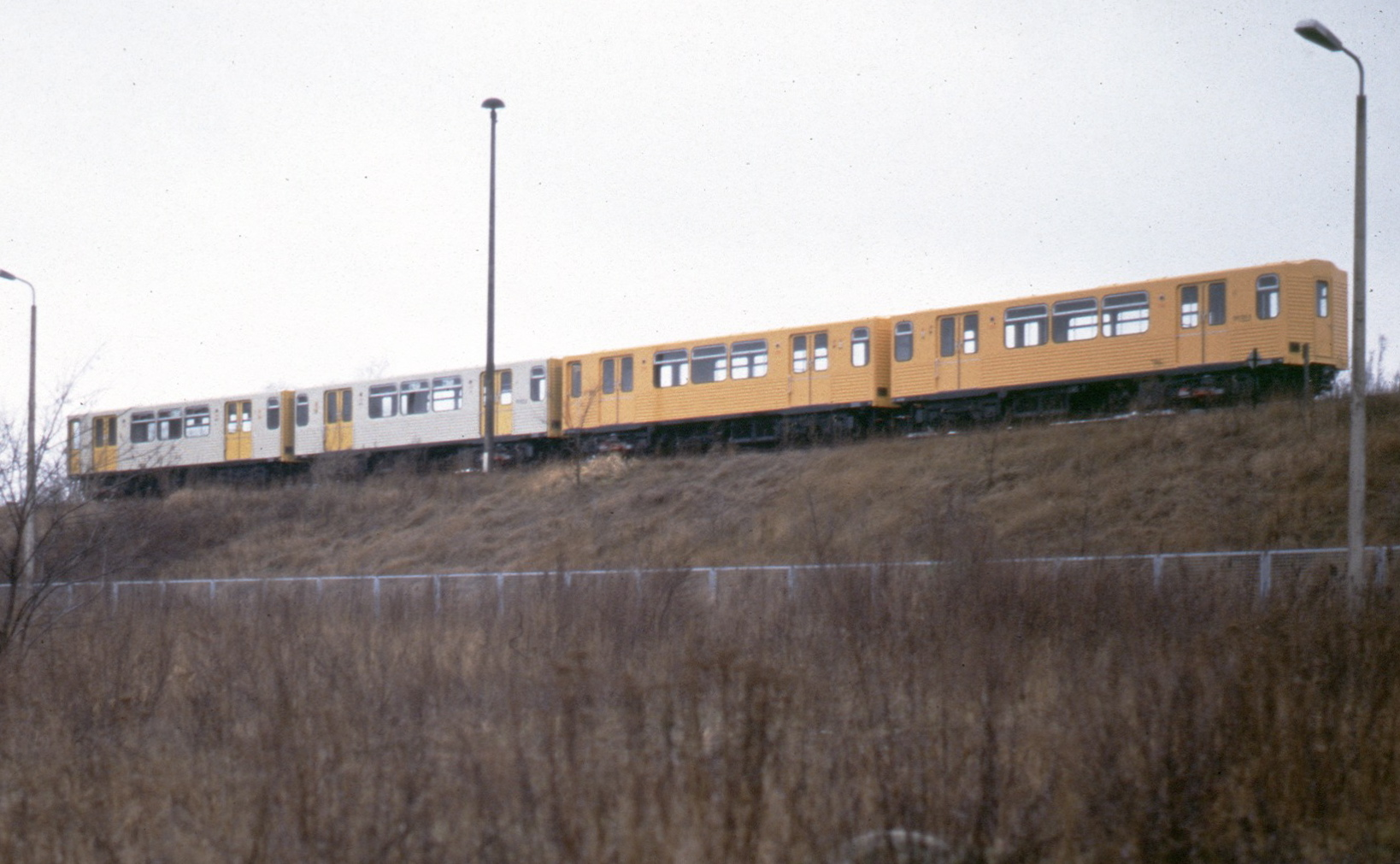
Different livery variations, BVB (left) and BVG (right), in December 1991

== Replacement ==
The Class G trains are to be replaced by the Class JK trains starting in 2025.

== Korean State Railway 500 series ==
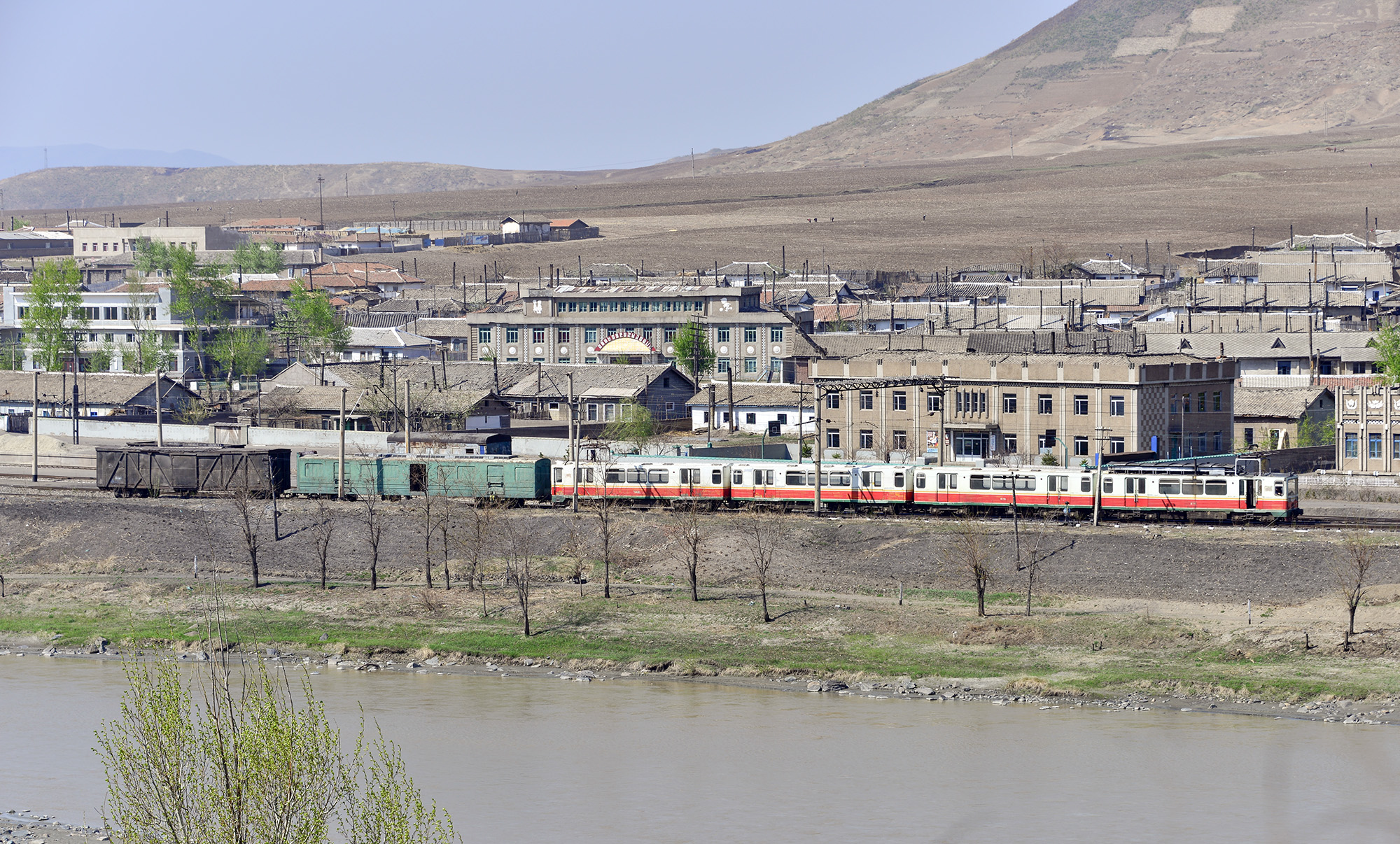
A Class GI trainset pulling a mixed train at Sambong on the Hambuk Line, North Korea.

After the GI class was withdrawn from use on the Pyongyang Metro, they were converted by the Kim Chong-t'ae Electric Locomotive Works to operate as EMUs on the national railway lines of the Korean State Railway, which numbered them in the 500 series. They are frequently seen in the northern part of North Korea, running along the Hambuk Line, the Pukpu Line, and the Manpo Line; they are occasionally seen running as mixed trains pulling regular railway freight cars.
