= Sugupo station =

Railway station in North Korea

Sugup'o 수구포
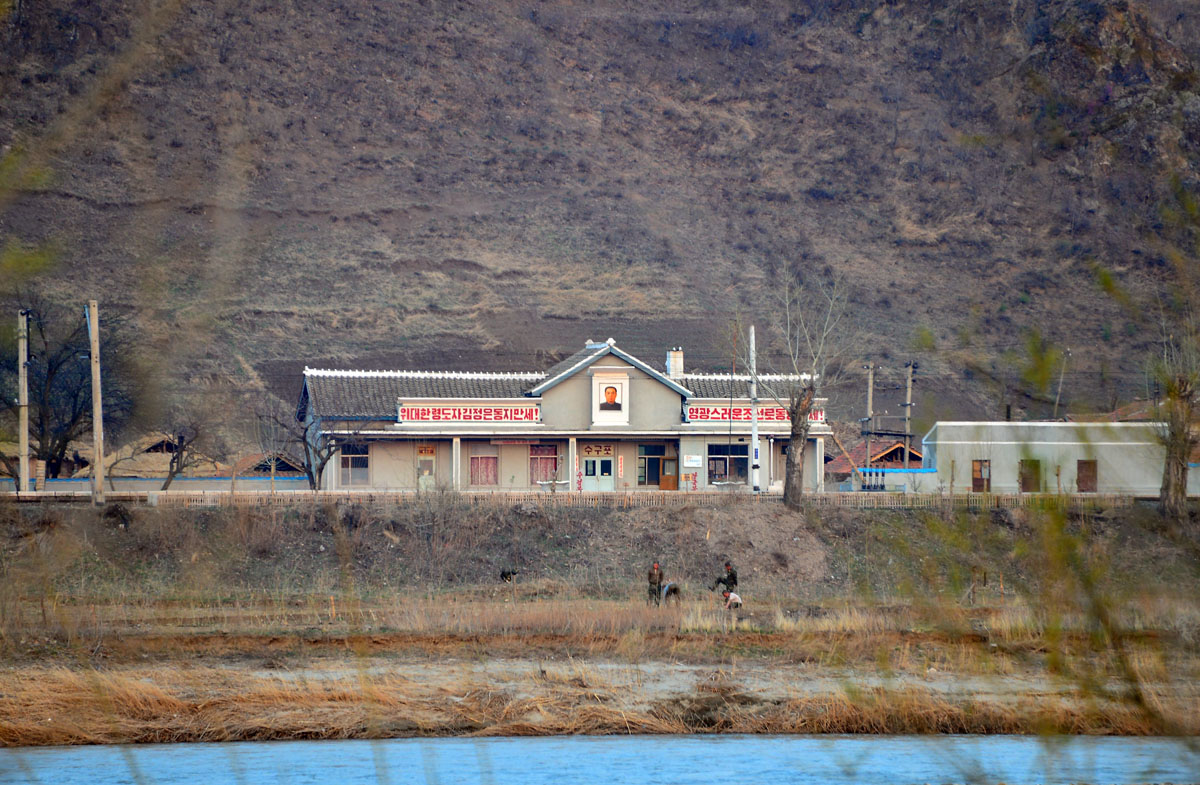

Korean name
- Hangul: 수구포역
- Hanja: 水口浦驛
- Revised Romanization: Sugupo-yeok
- McCune–Reischauer: Sugup'o-yŏk

General information
- Location: Yŏnggang-ri, Onsŏng, North Hamgyŏng; North Korea
- Coordinates: 42.8675°N 129.8406°E
- Owner: Korean State Railway

History
- Opened: 1 August 1933

Services
Preceding station	Korean State Railway	Following station
Kangyang towards Rajin	Hambuk Line	Kangalli towards Ch'ŏngjin Ch'ŏngnyŏn
Location

Sugup'o station is a railway station in Yŏnggang-ri, Onsŏng County, North Hamgyŏng, North Korea, on the Hambuk Line of the Korean State Railway.

== History ==
It was opened by the Chosen Government Railway on 1 August 1933, together with the rest of the Tonggwanjin–Namyang section of the former East Tomun Line (Tonggwanjin–Unggi).
