= BVG Class A =

U-Bahn rolling stock

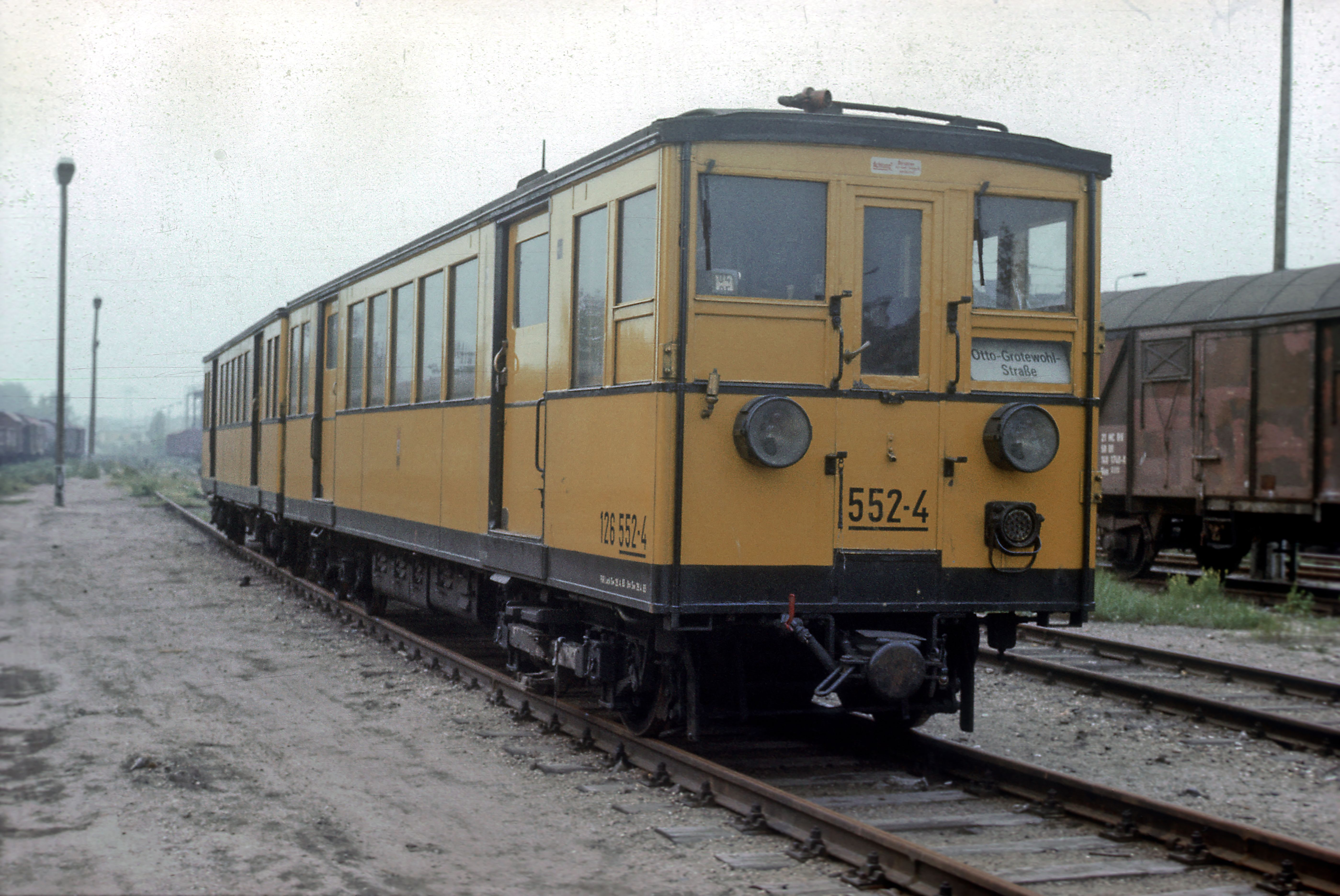
- Class A train at Berlin-Schöneweide in June 1986
- In service: 1901–1989
- Constructed: 1901–1951
- Successor: BVG Class A3; BVG Class G
- Formation: 2 cars per set
- Operator: Berliner Verkehrsbetriebe

Specifications
- Doors: 2 pairs per side (per car)
- Electric system: 750 V DC third rail
- Current collection: Contact shoe
- Track gauge: 1,435 mm (4 ft 8 1/2 in)

The A class trains were the first trains used on the Berlin U-Bahn network. These trains were used for 88 years in Berlin from 1901 to 1989, and besides the smaller profile trains, it also went to the bigger profile trains when there are not enough trains on the network, such as the case of U5, U6 and U8.

== Numbering System ==
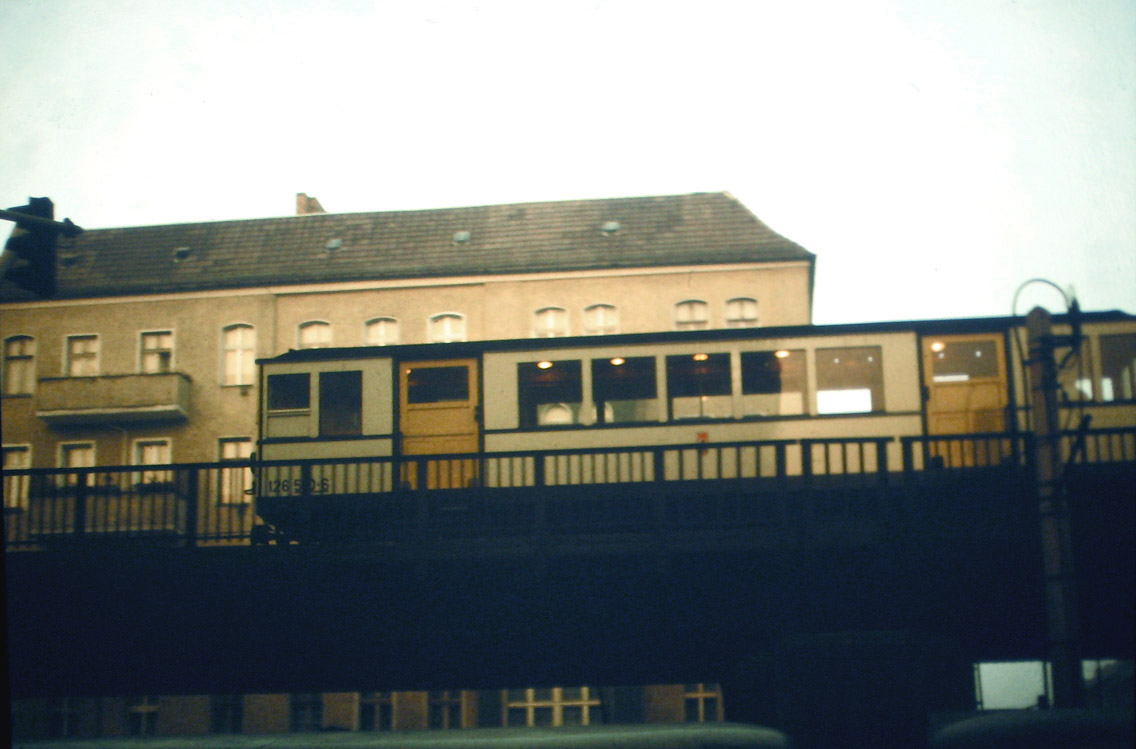

Number after 1970
Type	Number
AI	125 400–125 456; 175 401–176 457
AIU	126 500–126 580; 176 501–176 581
AII	127 600–127 646; 177 601–177 647
AIIU	128 700–128 734; 178 701–178 735

The cars of the AI and AII were numbered starting with 1, and the trailer cars were in the 200 series, before renumbering into the 500 series in 1912. The second reuse of the numbers 1 to 58 was made in 1926, before it conflicts onto the original assigned numbers.

In 1970, BVB instituted an electronic data processing system, resulting in motor cars being renumbered to 125-128 series. Trailer cars were renumbered into the 175-178 series.

== A I ==
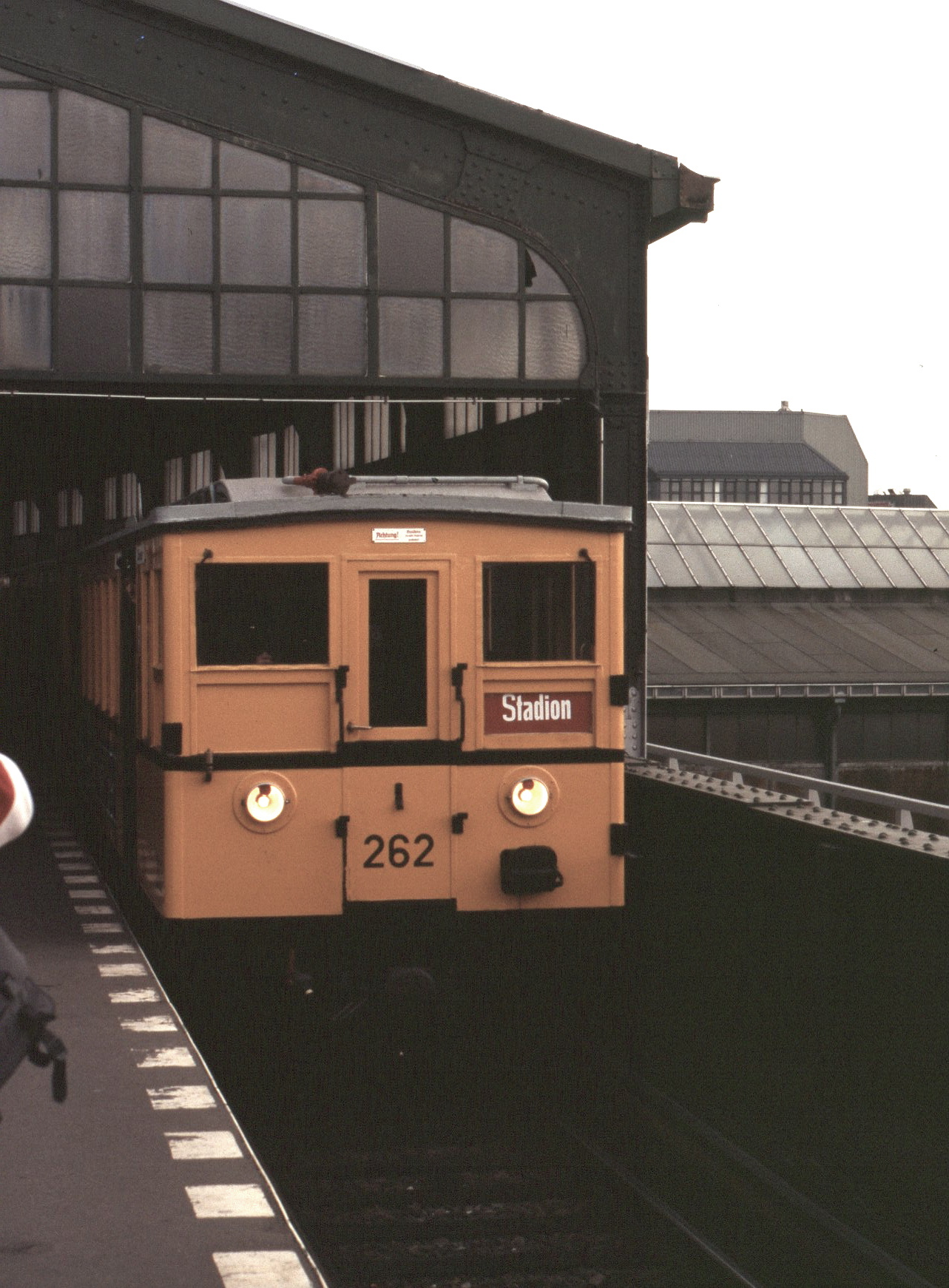
Class A at Gleisdreieck

Order	Year	Motor cars	Trailer cars (Note: before 1912, the side cars were numbered in 2xx series)
1.	1901/03	1–42	501–522
2.	1902/03	43–57	523–528
3.	1902/03	58–66	529–531
4.	1903/04		532–538

Two test vehicles were ordered for the first Berlin U-Bahn line from the Cologne coach builders, van der Zypen & Charlier. One of these vehicles was used by Wilhelm II in 1908, leading to their nickname Kaiserwagen ("emperor's coach"). The train width of 2.30 meters was already fixed at this point. At that time, trains and subways were still modelled on streetcars. The first production vehicles, which were appropriately titled A-I, were built in the Warschauer Brücke workshop. At the U-Bahn's opening in 1902, 42 motor cars and 21 trailer cars were ready for service. Unlike the test vehicles, the seating was placed along the walls of the train, which was considered more comfortable. This arrangement is still used today in Kleinprofil trains. These trains had a top speed of 50 km/h.

During the high traffic accident at Gleisdreieck on September 26, 1908; the railcar 3 was so badly damaged that it left the vehicle fleet. The other cars in an accident are repaired.

Because Berlin or more specifically the Nord-Süd-Bahn AG had no Großprofil trains for the opening of the Hallesches Tor – Stettiner Bahnhof route (now U6), the running of that route was handed to the (then) privately owned Hochbahngesellschaft, which serviced the route using Kleinprofil trains with wooden boards (the so-called Blumenbretter, "flower boards") attached to the sides.

In 1926, a total of 32 railcars were converted to sidecar to allow better operation with four-car trains. An unconverted sidecar was retired this year. These trains were retired after serious accidents in 1937. Of the eight, four were badly damaged in World War II. At Stadtmitte, the train was badly destroyed by an artillery battery. The other four came in equal parts of BVB and BVG where they were retired after the erection of Berlin Wall on 14 August 1961. Of the four deliveries of the cars, no vehicle has been preserved.

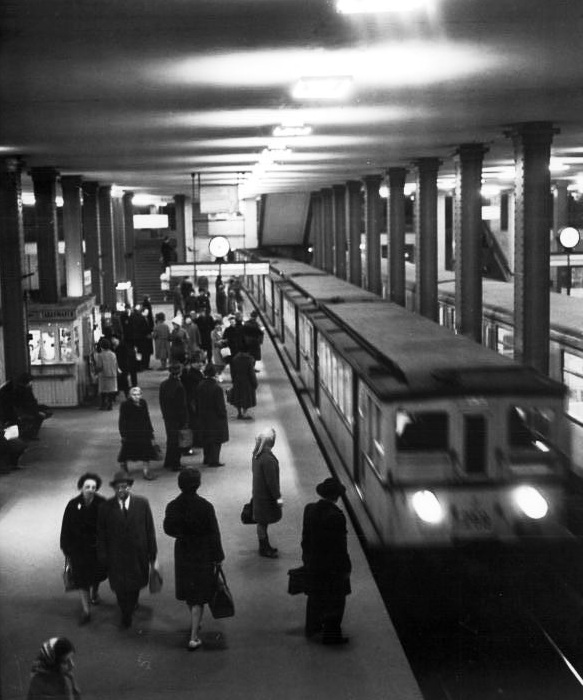
A IK trains at Alexanderplatz

=== Holzwagen Trains ===
Order	Year	Motor cars	Trailer cars
5.	1906/07	67–72	539–551
6.	1908	73–78	552–559
7.	1908	79–82	
8.	1908	83–114	558–586
9.	1909	115–120	
10.	1909	121–129	587–596
11.	1910	130–133	597–600
12.	1912	131–139	601–612
13.	1913	140–163	613–636
14.	1913	164–226	637–674
15.	1913	227–229	675–680

Between 1906 and 1913, further batches of A-I vehicles were delivered; making possible 8-car trains, which had become necessary due to rising traffic. Originally there were smoking compartments and third class cars on the U-Bahn. Different classes were abandoned in 1927. In 1935, multiple units of the 5 and 6 class were withdrawn. 22 multiple units and 26 side cars were destroyed in World War II. The trains were retired in 1966 in the BVG-West and were replaced by A3L66, and 1989 in the BVB-Ost.

=== Schöneberg Trains ===
Order	Year	BVG	Schöneberg (Note: Numbers before 1928)
1.	1910	358–369	11–22
2.	1912	765–770	23–29

In 1926 the Schöneberg U-Bahn, which had been independent and had used their own vehicles up to that point, was taken over by the main U-Bahn network. Because a connection to the rest of the network had been planned from the beginning, the Schöneberg trains had been built to the same specifications as the main network. Some trains went over to the U5 in 1945.

=== Stahlwagen Trains ===
Order	Year	Motor cars	Trailer cars
16.	1924/25	230–280	681–731
17.	1925/26	281–292	732–743
18.	1926	1–58; 293–306	751–764

One-person operation had begun in 1964, resulting in all A-I Class trains were phased out from Line AIII and Line BI, followed by AI and BII by 1966.

BVG-West had withdrawn the wooden cars by 1966 and the steel cars by 1968. The last trains ran on the Line 3 and 4 and replaced by A3L67. All the BVG-Ost trains, took their time because they did not have technology, and they were in desperate need for replacement - the G-Zug. Finally, by 5 November 1989, all the trains have been withdrawn. It is the only train that lasts during the East Berlin division.

== A II ==
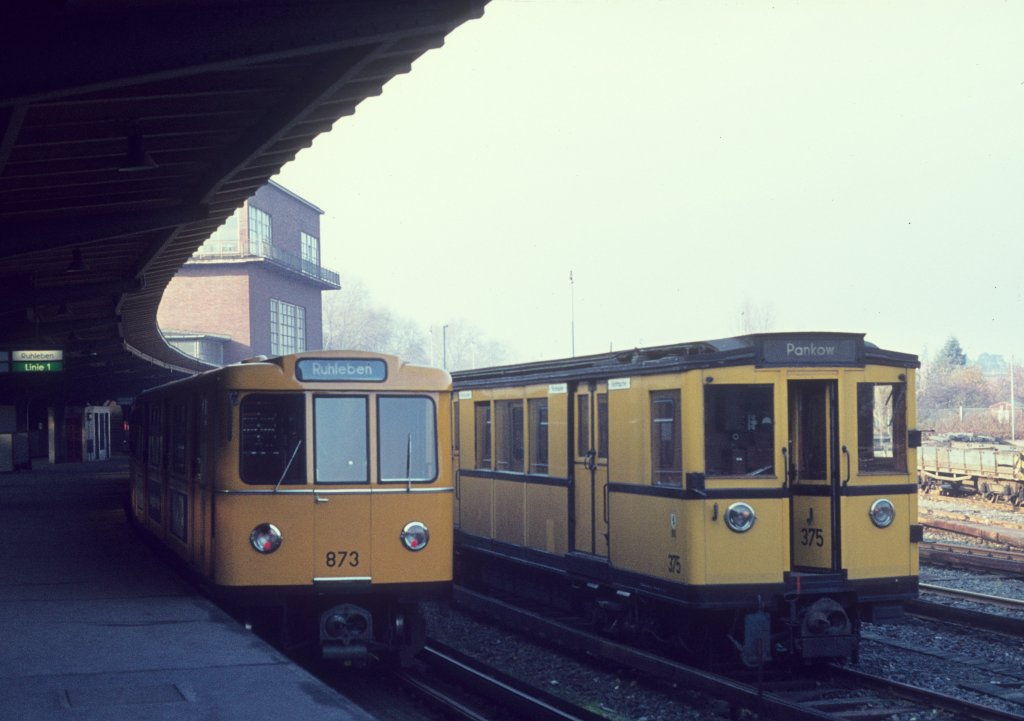
BVG A II trains at Ruhleben in 1973

Order	Year	Motor cars	Trailer cars
19.	1928	307–357	771–821
20.	1928/29	370–414	822–866
22.	1947-51	416-425	744, 747, 748

From 1928 to 1929 a new type of Kleinprofil was introduced, the A-II cars. The most notable difference to the A-I type was that the A-II only had three windows and two sliding doors. Berliners called these trains Ammanullah-cars because the Afghan king Amanullah Khan had supposedly steered one of these trains during his 1928 Berlin visit.

BVG-West had withdrawn the trains on 30 April 1973 and where formerly deployed on Line 2, A3L71 took over. The BVG-Ost took their time to withdraw the trains, and by 5 November 1989, the trains had been withdrawn. It is the only train that lasts during the East Berlin division.

The 21st order of A class trains was delivered in 1929. 207 and 209 were converted as test vehicles into 507 and 509. 515 and 867 were also there. It was converted into a maintenance and driver training vehicle after the retirement in 1976.

The 22nd order of A class trains was delivered between 1947 and 1951 replacing some of the trains badly damaged in the war. Those are 416-425 (motor car) and 744, 747 and 748 (trailer car). 748 was withdrawn in 1972 and 744 and 747 were used for the last trip on 30 April 1973.

== Preserved Units ==
In total, these are the units that were preserved in Berlin.

Number	Manufacturer	Year	Type	Place
7	Busch	1926	A1 T4	Museumsbestand BVG
86	Falkenried	1908	A1 T4	Bestand AG U-Bahn
201	Wismar	1913	A1 T4	DB Museum Nürnberg
212	MAN	1913	A1 T4	Bestand AG U-Bahn, returned to original state
262	Fuchs	1925	A1 T4	Museumsbestand BVG
294	vdZ	1926	A1 T4	Museumsbestand BVG
377	MAN	1928	A2 T	Museumsbestand BVG
359	MAN	1910	A1 SI	ex Schöneberg 12, half of them returned to original condition, from Klosterstraße
390		1928	A2U T	Bestand AG U-Bahn, condition as in 1973, rollable
404	Wismar	1928	A2 T	Museumsbestand BVG
559	Falkenried	1906	A1 B	Deutsches Technikmuseum Berlin
722	Credé	1924	A1 B	Museumsbestand BVG
737	Credé	1925	A1 B	Museumsbestand BVG
836	C&U	1928	A2 B	Museumsbestand BVG
848	C&U	1928	A2 B	Museumsbestand BVG
