= Badaohe =

Badaohe 八道河镇
- Town
- Bādàohé Zhèn
- Location in Hebei Location in China
- Coordinates: 40°23′48″N 118°46′54″E
- Country: People's Republic of China
- Province: Hebei
- Prefecture-level city: Qinhuangdao
- Autonomous county: Qinglong

Area
  - Total: 169.1 km^{2} (65.3 sq mi)

Population (2010)
  - Total: 28,499
  - Density: 168.5/km^{2} (436/sq mi)
- Time zone: UTC+8 (China Standard)

Badaohe (Chinese: 八道河镇; pinyin: Bādàohé Zhèn) is a town located in Qinglong Manchu Autonomous County, Qinhuangdao, Hebei, China. According to the 2010 census, Badaohe had a population of 28,499, including 14,987 males and 13,512 females. The population was distributed as follows: 5,446 people aged under 14, 20,779 people aged between 15 and 64, and 2,274 people aged over 65.

== See also ==
- List of township-level divisions of Hebei
