= Chaoyangchuan =

Town in Jilin, China

Coordinates: 43°10′N 129°19′E

Chaoyangchuan 朝阳川镇 · 조양천 진
- Town
- Interactive map of Chaoyangchuan
- Country: China
- Province: Jilin
- Autonomous prefecture: Yanbian
- County-level city: Yanji
- Subdivisions: List: 5 residential communities 20 villages

Chaoyangchuan is a town in Yanji, Yanbian, Jilin, China. It has a total population of 54,000 and an area of 393 sq km. 65% of the population is Korean.

Chaoyangchuan is divided into the following divisions:

Residential communities:

- Shengli Community (胜利社区)
- Wenhua Community (文化社区)
- Chunguang Community (春光社区)
- Chaoyang Community (朝阳社区)
- Heping Community (和平社区)

Villages:

- Jicheng Village (吉成村)
- Qinlao Village (勤劳村)
- Taidong Village (太东村)
- Guangshi Village (光石村)
- Dexin Village (德新村)
- Hexing Village (合成村)
- Sanfeng Village (三峰村)
- Sancheng Village (三成村)
- Dongfeng Village (东丰村)
- Changqing Village (长青村)
- Guangrong Village (光荣村)
- Chaoyang Village (朝阳村)
- Longsheng Village (龙盛村)
- Liuxin Village (柳新村)
- Hengdao Village (横道村)
- Zhongping Village (仲坪村)
- Taixing Village (太兴村)
- Badao Village (八道村)
- Changsheng Village (长胜村)
- Pingdao Village (平道村)
