= Chongsong station =

Railway station in North Korea

Chongsŏng 종성
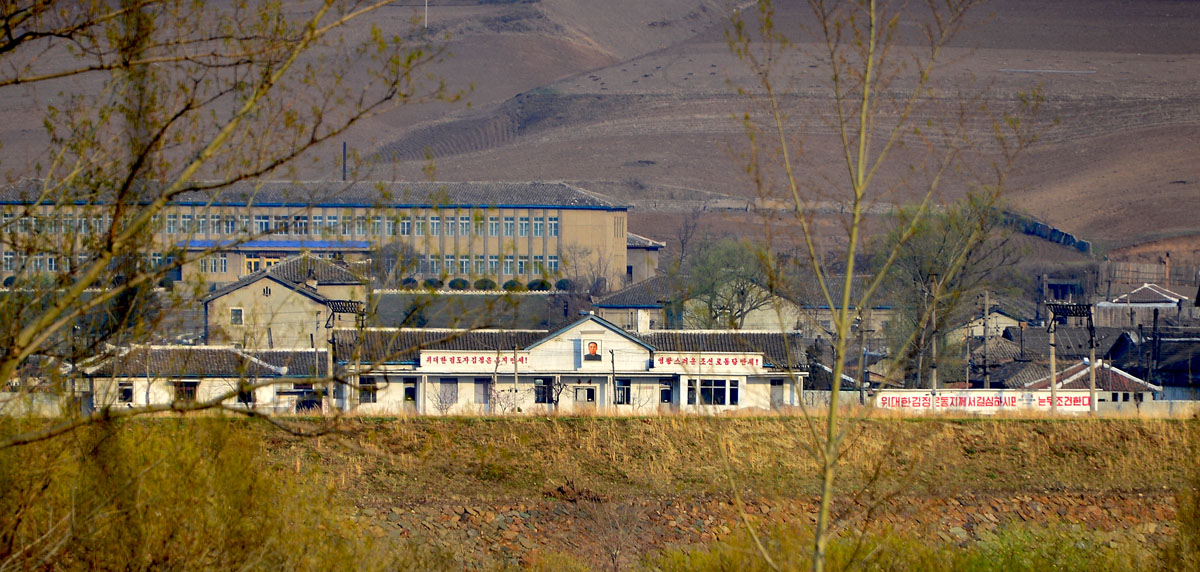

Korean name
- Hangul: 종성역
- Hanja: 鍾城驛
- Revised Romanization: Jongseong-yeok
- McCune–Reischauer: Chongsŏng-yŏk

General information
- Location: Chongsŏng-rodongjagu, Onsŏng, North Hamgyŏng; North Korea
- Coordinates: 42.7626°N 129.7901°E
- Owner: Korean State Railway

History
- Opened: 1 December 1922
- Original company: Tomun Railway

Services
Preceding station	Korean State Railway	Following station
Kangalli towards Rajin	Hambuk Line	Sambong towards Ch'ŏngjin Ch'ŏngnyŏn
Terminus	Tongp'o Line	Tongp'o Terminus
Location

Chongsŏng station is a railway station in Chongsŏng-rodongjagu, Onsŏng County, North Hamgyŏng, North Korea, on the Hambuk Line of the Korean State Railway; it is also the starting point of the 15.6 km-long branchline to Tongp'o.

== History ==
It was opened by the Tomun Railway in 1922, together with the rest of the Sangsambong–Chongsŏng section of their line (Hoeryŏng–Tonggwanjin), which on 1 April 1929 was nationalised and became the West Tomun Line of the Chosen Government Railway, and from 1934 to 1940 it was managed by the South Manchuria Railway. Finally, after the partition of Korea it became part of the Korean State Railway.
