= Kangalli station =

Railway station in North Korea

Kangalli 강안리
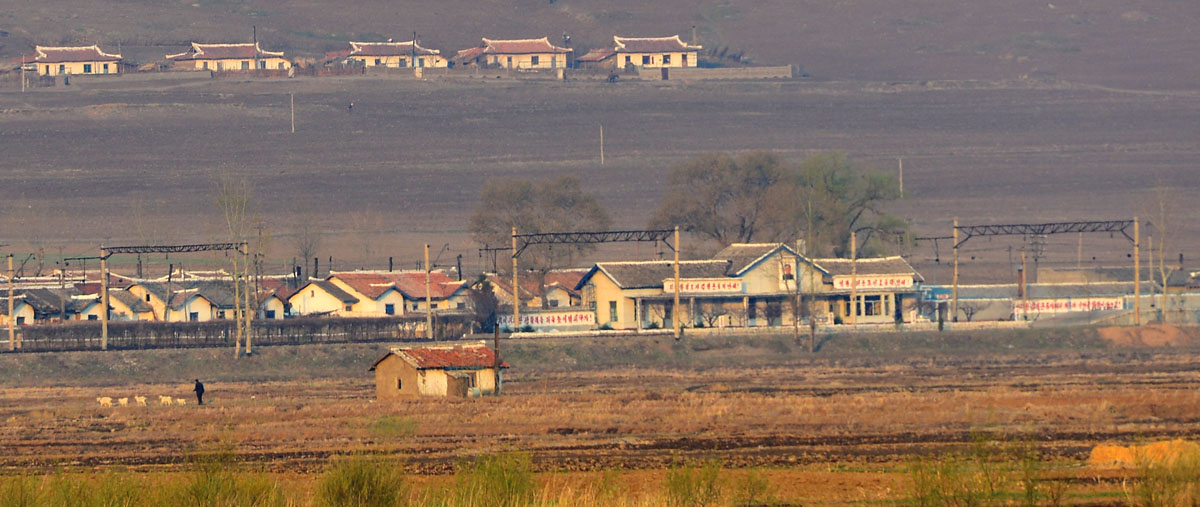

Korean name
- Hangul: 강안리역
- Hanja: 江岸里驛
- Revised Romanization: Gangalli-yeok
- McCune–Reischauer: Kangalli-yŏk

General information
- Location: Kangal-li, Onsŏng, North Hamgyŏng; North Korea
- Coordinates: 42.8239°N 129.8241°E
- Owner: Korean State Railway

History
- Opened: 1 December 1922
- Original company: Tomun Railway

Services
Preceding station	Korean State Railway	Following station
Sugup'o towards Rajin	Hambuk Line	Chongsŏng towards Ch'ŏngjin Ch'ŏngnyŏn
Terminus	Sŏngp'yŏng Line	Sŏngp'yŏng Terminus
Location

Kangalli station is a railway station in Kangal-li, Onsŏng County, North Hamgyŏng, North Korea, on the Hambuk Line of the Korean State Railway. It is also the starting point of the Sŏngp'yŏng branch to Sŏngp'yŏng.

== History ==
Originally called Tonggwanjin station, it was opened by the Tomun Railway Company on 1 December 1922, together with the rest of the Sangsambong–Chongsŏng section of their line, thereby completing the entirety of the Tomun Railway's line from Hoeryŏng to Tonggwanjin. On 1 April 1929 was nationalised and became the West Tomun Line of the Chosen Government Railway.

On 1 August 1933 the Chosen Government Railway completed their East Tomun Line from Unggi to Tonggwanjin, by closing the final gap between Namyang and here; at the same time, the station was renamed Tonggwan station.

The station received its current name after the establishment of the DPRK.
