= Hoeryong Chongnyon station =

Railway station in Hoeryong, North Korea

Hoeryŏng Ch'ŏngnyŏn 회령청년
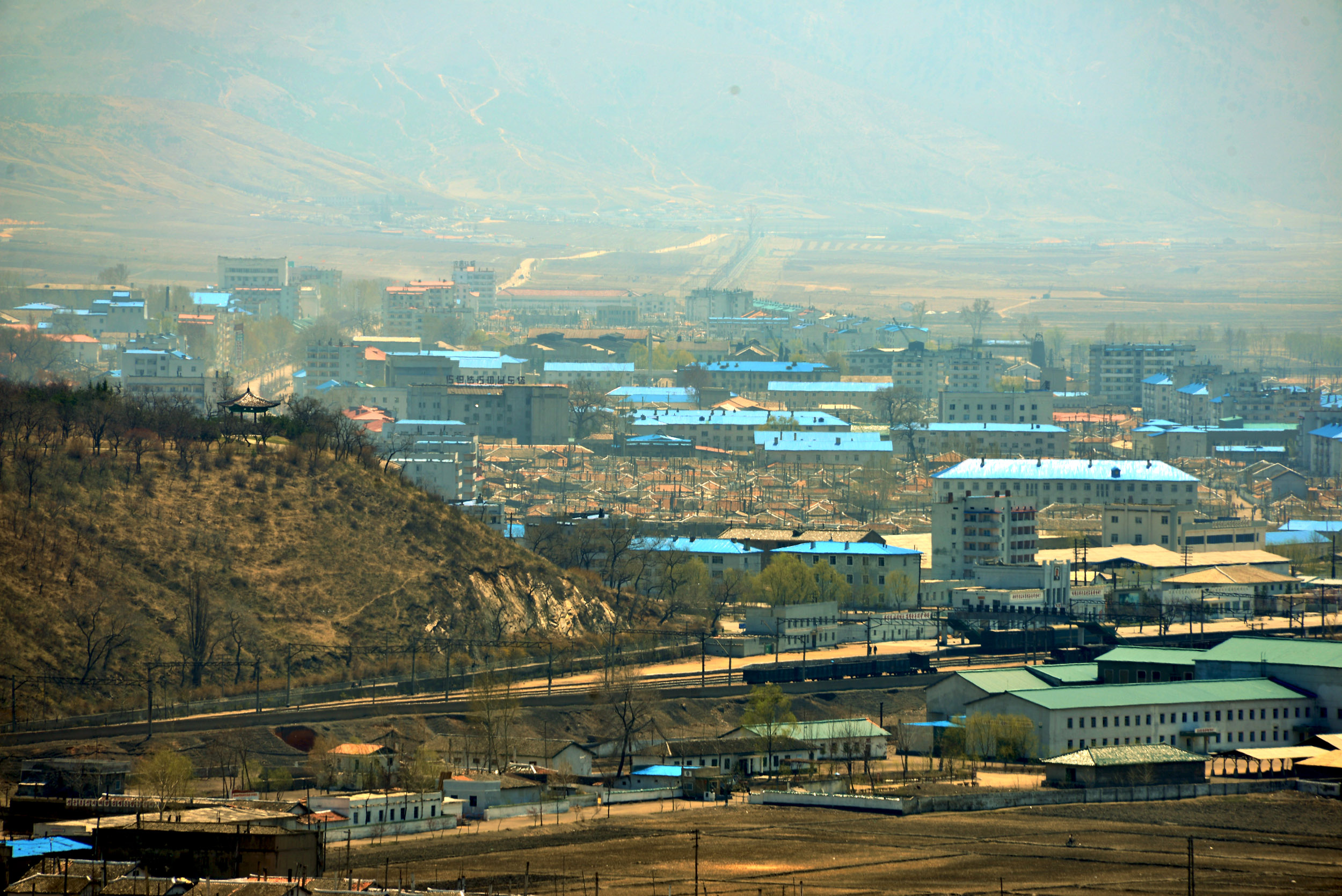
- Hoeryŏng Ch'ŏngnyŏn station

Korean name
- Hangul: 회령청년역
- Hanja: 会寧青年驛
- Revised Romanization: Hoeryeong Cheongnyeon-yeok
- McCune–Reischauer: Hoeryŏng Ch'ŏngnyŏn-yŏk

General information
- Location: Hoeryŏng, North Hamgyŏng; North Korea
- Coordinates: 42.4449°N 129.7425°E
- Owner: Korean State Railway

History
- Opened: 25 November 1917
- Former names: Hoeryŏng
- Original company: Chosen Government Railway

Services
Preceding station	Korean State Railway	Following station
Kŭmsaeng towards Rajin	Hambuk Line	Taedŏk towards Ch'ŏngjin Ch'ŏngnyŏn
Pongŭi towards Yusŏn	Hoeryŏng Colliery Line	Terminus
Location

Hoeryŏng Ch'ŏngnyŏn station is a railway station in Hoeryŏng-si, North Hamgyŏng, North Korea, on the Hambuk Line of the Korean State Railway. It is also the starting point of the 10.6-km-long freight-only Hoeryŏng Colliery Line to Yusŏn-dong, Hoeryŏng-si.

There are locomotive servicing facilities at this station.

== History ==
Originally called Hoeryŏng station, it was opened on 25 November 1917 together with the rest of the P'ungsan-Hoeryŏng section of the former Hamgyŏng Line. It received its current name after the establishment of the DPRK.

== Services ==
=== Freight ===
Trains carrying coal from mines on the Hoeryŏng Colliery Line to the Kim Chaek Iron & Steel Complex at Kimchaek and the Ch'ŏngjin Steel Works in Ch'ŏngjin run regularly through this station.

=== Passenger ===
A number of passenger trains serve Hoeryŏng Ch'ŏngnyŏn station, including the semi-express trains 113/114, operating between West P'yŏngyang and Unsŏng via Ch'ŏngjin and Hoeryŏng. There are also long-distance trains Kalma-Ch'ŏngjin-Hoeryŏng-Rajin; Ch'ŏngjin-Hoeryŏng-Rajin; Haeju-Ch'ŏngjin-Hoeryŏng-Unsŏng; and Tanch'ŏnCh'ŏngjin-Hoeryŏng-Tumangang. There is also a commuter service operated between Hoeryŏng and Sech'ŏn via Sinhakp'o.
