= Domun Railway =

Japanese colonial company in Korea

Domun Railway Co. Ltd.

Overview
- Native name: 도문철도주식회사 (Domun Cheoldo Jusikhoesa) 図們鉄道株式会社 (Tomon Tetsudō Kabushiki Kaisha)

The Tomon Railway Company (Japanese: 図們鉄道株式会社, Tomon Tetsudo Kabushiki Kaisha; Korean: 도문철도주식회사; RR: Domun Cheoldo Jusikhoesa), was a privately owned railway company in Korea, Empire of Japan.

== History ==
The Tomon Railway's line ran from Kainei to Tōkanchin, and was opened in three stages: the Kainei–Jōsanpō section (40.4 km (25.1 mi)) was completed on 5 January 1920, the Jōsanpō–Shōjō section (9.1 km (5.7 mi)) on 1 December 1922, and the Shōjō–Tōkanchin section (8.2 km (5.1 mi)) on 1 November 1924.

The narrow-gauge Tiantu Railway, opened in 1923, signed a cross-border operational agreement with the Tomon Railway on 26 June 1926, after which a bridge across the Tumen River between Jōsanpō and Kaishantun was opened on 30 September 1927.

The last line to be opened by the Tomon Railway was the 10.6 km (6.6 mi) Kainei Colliery Line from Kainei to Keirin, which was opened on 11 August 1928.

This line was nationalised on 1 April 1929, becoming the West Domun Line of the Chōsen Government Railway (Sentetsu). Subsequently, merged with Sentetsu's East Tomon Line (Tōkanchin–Yūki), the management of the entire line was transferred to the South Manchuria Railway; at that time, the merged Tomon Line was added to the existing (Genzan-Seishin) Kankyō Line. In 1933 the Manchukuo National Railway bought the Tiantu Railway, converting it to standard gauge to make a shorter, more direct line from Kaishantun to Chaoyangchuan on the MNR's Jingtu Line to Xinjing, opening the new line for use at the end of March 1934.

After the end of the Pacific War, the Provisional People’s Committee for North Korea nationalised all railways in the Soviet zone of occupation on 10 August 1946, and following the establishment of North Korea, the Korean State Railway was created. After the end of the Korean War, the restructuring of the North Korean railway system, including the rearrangement of rail lines, led to the Hoeryeong–Sambong line becoming part of the Korean State Railway's Hambuk Line running from Cheongjin to Rajin via Namyang.

== Rolling stock ==
Little is known about the Domun Railway's motive power; however, it is known that four 2-6-2T tank locomotives operated by the Domun Railway became Sentetsu's Pureko- and Purero-class locomotives after nationalisation of the company.

== Network ==
Main line
Distance		Station name					
Total; km	S2S; km	Transcribed, Korean	Transcribed, Japanese	Hunminjeongeum	Hanja/Kanji	Connections	Opened
0.0	0.0	Hoeryeong	Kainei	회령	會寧	Hoeryeong Colliery Line	5 January 1920
0.9	0.9	Sinhoeryeong	Shinkainei	신회령	新会寧		5 January 1920
3.7	2.8	Geumsaeng	Kinsei	금생	金生		5 January 1920
9.4	5.7	Goryeongjin	Kōreichin	고령진	高嶺鎮		5 January 1920
14.8	5.4	Sinhakpo	Shinkakuho	신학포	新鶴浦	Secheon Line	5 January 1920
17.8	2.9	Hakpo	Kakuho	학포	鶴浦		5 January 1920
27.2	9.4	Sinjeon	Shinden	신전	新田		5 January 1920
33.6	6.4	Ganpyeong	Kanpei	간평	間坪		5 January 1920
40.5	6.9	Sangsambong	Jōsanpō	상삼봉	上三峰	Tiantu Railway (opened 30 September 1927)	5 January 1920
43.7	3.2	Hasambong	Kasanpō	하삼봉	下三峰		1 December 1922
52.8	9.1	Jongseong	Shōjō	종성	鍾城	Tongpo Line	1 December 1922
58.0	5.2	Soam	Shōgan	소암	小岩		1 November 1924
66.2	8.2	Tonggwanjin	Tōkanchin	동관진	東関鎮	Seongpyeong Line	1 November 1924

會寧炭鑛線 - 회령탄광선 - Kainei Tankō Line - Hoeryeong Tan-gwang Line
Distance		Station name					
Total; km	S2S; km	Transcribed, Korean	Transcribed, Japanese	Hunminjeongeum	Hanja/Kanji	Connections	Opened
0.0	0.0	Hoeryeong	Kainei	회령	會寧	main line	5 January 1920
5.3	5.3	Yeongsu	Yōsui	영수	永綏		11 August 1928
9.2	3.9	Bongui	Hōgi	봉의	鳳儀		11 August 1928
10.6	1.4	Gyerim	Keirin	계림	鶏林		11 August 1928

細川線 - 세천선 - Saisen Line - Secheon Line
Distance		Station name					
Total; km	S2S; km	Transcribed, Korean	Transcribed, Japanese	Hunminjeongeum	Hanja/Kanji	Connections	Opened
0.0	0.0	Sinhakpo	Shinkakuho	신학포	新鶴浦	main line	5 January 1920
8.6	8.6	Secheon	Saisen	세천	細川		1920
14.4	5.8	Jungbong	Chūhō	중봉	仲峰		1920

東浦線 - 동포선 - Tōho Line - Tongpo Line
Distance		Station name					
Total; km	S2S; km	Transcribed, Korean	Transcribed, Japanese	Hunminjeongeum	Hanja/Kanji	Connections	Opened
0.0	0.0	Jongseong	Shōjō	종성	鍾城	main line	1 December 1922
15.6	15.6	Tongpo	Tōho	동포	東浦		1 November 1924

城坪線 - 성평선 - Seihei Line - Songpyeong Line
Distance		Station name					
Total; km	S2S; km	Transcribed, Korean	Transcribed, Japanese	Hunminjeongeum	Hanja/Kanji	Connections	Opened
66.2	8.2	Tonggwanjin	Tōkanchin	동관진	東関鎮	main line	1 November 1924
		Namjudong	Nanshūtō	남주동	南州洞		1924
11.5	11.5	Seongpyeong	Jōhei	성평	城坪		1924
