= Sambong station =

Railway station in Onsong County, North Korea

Sambong 삼봉
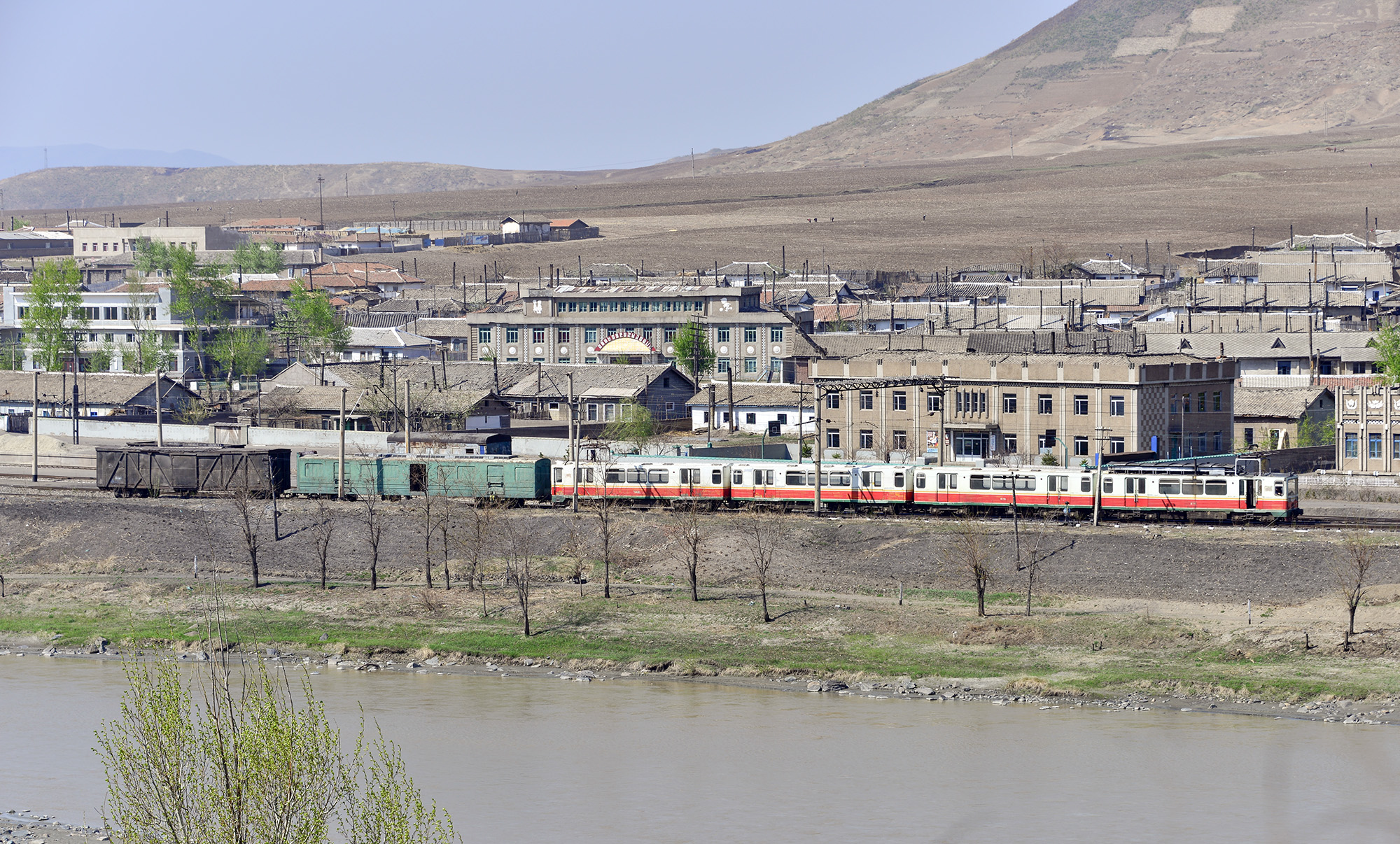
- A 500 series EMU pulling a mixed train at Sambong station

Korean name
- Hangul: 삼봉역
- Hanja: 三峰驛
- Revised Romanization: Sambong-yeok
- McCune–Reischauer: Sambong-yŏk

General information
- Location: Sambong-rodongjagu, Onsŏng, North Hamgyŏng; North Korea
- Coordinates: 42.6886°N 129.7841°E
- Owner: Korean State Railway

History
- Opened: 5 January 1920

Services
Preceding station	Korean State Railway	Following station
Chongsŏng towards Rajin	Hambuk Line	Kanp'yŏng towards Ch'ŏngjin Ch'ŏngnyŏn
Location

Sambong station is a railway station in Sambong-rodongjagu, Onsŏng County, North Hamgyŏng, North Korea, on the Hambuk Line of the Korean State Railway.

== History ==
Originally called Sangsambong station (Upper Sambong station), it was opened by the Tomun Railway Company on 5 January 1920, together with the rest of the Hoeryŏng–Sangsambong section of their line (Hoeryŏng–Tonggwanjin), which on 1 April 1929 was nationalised and became the West Tomun Line of the Chosen Government Railway. It received its current name after Hasambong station (Lower Sambong station) was closed in 1933, making the "Upper" prefix redundant.
