= Hamgyong Line =

1914–1942 railway line in Korea

Hamgyeong line

Overview
- Native name: 함경선 (咸鏡線)
- Status: Operational (see article)
- Owner: Chosen Government Railway, Domun Railway, South Manchuria Railway
- Locale: Gangwon, North Hamgyeong, South Hamgyeong
- Termini: Wonsan; Sangsambong

Service
- Type: Heavy rail, Passenger & freight rail Regional rail

History
- Opened: 1915−1942

Technical
- Line length: 664.0 km (412.6 mi)
- Track gauge: 1,435 mm (4 ft 8 1/2 in) standard gauge

- Hamgyong Line
- Hangul: 함경선
- Hanja: 咸鏡線
- RR: Hamgyeongseon
- MR: Hamgyŏngsŏn

The Hamgyeong line was a railway line of the Chosen Government Railway (Sentetsu) in Japanese-occupied Korea, running from Wonsan to Sangsambong. Construction began in 1914, and was completed in 1928. The line is now entirely within North Korea; the Korean State Railway has divided it between the Kangwŏn Line (Wonsan−Kowon section), the P'yŏngra Line (Kowon−Cheongjin section), the Kangdŏk Line (Namgangdŏk−Suseong), and the Hambuk Line (Chongjin−Sangsambong section).

== History ==
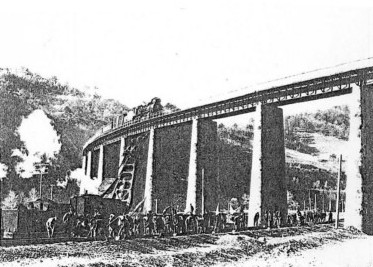
Construction of the Seokbong-Changpyeong section of the Hamgyeong line in 1916

Sentetsu began construction of a line north from Wonsan on the Gyeongwon Line on 1 October 1914. The first section, a 20.0 km (12.4 mi) line from Wonsan to Muncheon, was completed on 1 August 1915, followed by a 34.4 km (21.4 mi) extension from Muncheon to Yeongheung via Gowon on 21 July 1916. At the same time, Sentetsu started construction of a line north from the important east coast port of Cheongjin, completing the first 55.7 km (34.6 mi) section from Cheongjin to Changpyeong, on 5 November 1916.

On 31 July 1917, the management of Sentetsu was transferred from the Railway Bureau of the Government-General of Korea to the South Manchuria Railway (Mantetsu), which established the Mantetsu Gyeongseong Railway Administration (Japanese: 満鉄京城管理局, Mantetsu Keijō Kanrikyoku; 만철 경성 관리국, Mancheol Gyeongseong Gwalliguk) to oversee the operation of all railways in Korea. Construction of the Cheongjin Line was accelerated under Mantetsu management, and by the end of 1917 it had been completed all the way to Hoeryeong, with the 13.4 km (8.3 mi) from Changpyeong to Pungsan opened on 16 September, and the remaining 24.7 km (15.3 mi) to Hoeryong opened on 25 November of that year.

To handle increasing freight traffic on the line, a large marshalling yard, called Cheongjin Jochajang, was built near Cheongjin. To access this, a new 14.9 km (9.3 mi) line between Nanam and Suseong (on the Cheongjin−Changpyeong line) was built, being opened on 10 December 1919; Gangdeok station, located 7.2 km (4.5 mi) from Nanam, was opened on 1 August 1922. Construction of the southern portion of the Hamgyeong Line continued at the same time, with a new 69.5 km (43.2 mi) section from Yeongheung to Hamheung being opened on 15 December 1919.

Mantetsu continued expanding the Hamgyeong Line slowly over the next few years, opening 21.0 km (13.0 mi) south from Nanam to Jueul on 11 November 1920, 18.0 km (11.2 mi) north from Hamheung to Seohojin on 1 December 1922, followed by another 18.4 km (11.4 mi) north from Seohojin to Toejo on 25 September 1923. Following that three-year period of rather sedate expansion, on 11 October 1924 Mantetsu opened three major new sections: 58.0 km (36.0 mi) north from Teojo to Yanghwa, 39.5 km (24.5 mi) south from Jueul to Ponggang, as well as a disconnected, 84.7 km (52.6 mi) central section from Dancheon to Gilju.

On 1 April 1925, management of Korea's railways was returned to the Railway Bureau, and Sentetsu became independent of Mantetsu once again. Construction of the east coast line slowed down somewhat for a time, with 1925 seeing the opening of only 14.1 km (8.8 mi) of new line (Yanghwa−Sokhu), whilst in 1926 only 26.2 km (16.3 mi) of new construction was completed - 8.9 km (5.5 mi) north from Sokhu to Sinbukcheong, and 17.3 km (10.7 mi) south from Ponggang to Geukdong. The first half of 1927 was even slower - only an 8.1 km (5.0 mi) section from Geukdong to Yongdong had been completed by 10 June; in the second half of the year, however, major progress was made, with over 85 km (53 mi) of new railway opened: 39.4 km (24.5 mi) from Gilju to Yongdong, 31.5 km (19.6 mi) from Gunseon to Dancheon, as well as a section of approximately 15 km (9.3 mi) from Sinbukcheong to Bansong (this station, located somewhere between Geosan and Geonja, was closed on 31 August 1928.

The final 26.1 km (16.2 mi) gap between Geosan and Gunseon was closed on 1 September 1928, completing the line in its entirety from Wonsan to Hoeryeong. At the same time, the line was split, with the Wonsan−Cheongjin section being named the Hamgyeong Main Line, and the Cheongjin−Hoeryeong section becoming the Cheongjin Line. These lines later played a major role in the Japanese invasion of Manchuria, and grew further in importance after the establishment of the puppet state of Manchukuo.

The privately owned Domun Railway was formed in 1920, opening its first line, (40.4 km (25.1 mi)) from Hoeryeong to Sangsambong on 5 January 1920. This line was subsequently extended twice, from Sangsambong to Jongseon (9.1 km (5.7 mi)) on 1 December 1922, and from Jongseon to Donggwanjin (8.2 km (5.1 mi)) on 1 November 1924.

In order to create the shortest possible route from Japan to eastern Manchuria, Sentetsu began construction of a line from Unggi (now Sŏnbong) to Donggwanjin via Namyang in 1929. Named the East Domun Line, it reached Donggwanjin on 1 August 1933, at which time the entire Hoeryeong−Unggi line was redesignated as the Domun Line, and Donggwanjin Station was renamed to Donggwan Station.

On 1 April 1929, the Domun Railway was nationalised, with the mainline becoming Sentetsu's West Domun Line, after which the Manchukuo National bought the Tiantu Railway, converting it to standard gauge and opening the new line, called Chaokai Line, at the end of March 1934, creating a second direct connection across the Tumen River between Korea and Manchukuo.

Just a few months after completion of the line from Unggi, on 1 October 1933 the management of Sentetsu's entire route from Cheongjin to Unggi was transferred to Mantetsu,. On 1 November 1934, Mantetsu rearranged these lines, merging the Namyang Border Line with the Unggi−Namyang section of the Domun Line to create the North Chosen East Line (Unggi–Namyang–Tumen), with the Namyang–Sambong section becoming the North Chosen West Line. In 1936, the "Asahi" express train between Xinjing and Najin was inaugurated, to connect to the ferry from Najin to Japan.

In 1940, management of the Cheongjin–Sangsambong route was transferred back to Sentetsu, merging it with the Wonsan−Cheongjin Hamgyeong Main Line to create the Hamgyeong Line; Mantetsu continued to manage the North Chosen Line, eventually acquiring outright ownership of the line.

On 1 December 1941, a new line was opened between Nanam and Cheongjin to allow trains to bypass the Cheongjin marshalling yard. The existing line, running via Gangdeok Station and the marshalling yard, was detached from the Hamgyeong Line and designated the Gangdeok Line; at the same time, a 2.4 km (1.5 mi) connection from Cheongjin Seohang Station (Cheongjin West Port) to Gangdeok was built, to allow southbound trains to access the marshalling yard without having to reverse at Nanam. Later, the Cheongjin−Changpyeong line was realigned, reducing the distance from Cheongjin to Suseong from 9.0 km (5.6 mi) to 7.8 km (4.8 mi); this work was completed on 1 February 1942.

Service on the line was suspended after the Soviet invasion at the end of the Pacific War. The damage sustained by the line during the war was slow to be repaired due to strained relations between the Soviets and the Korean People's Committees; those two bridges have not been repaired to the present day. After the partition of Korea, the Provisional People’s Committee for North Korea nationalised all railways in the Soviet zone of occupation on 10 August 1946, and following the establishment of the DPRK, the Korean State Railway was created in 1948. After the end of the Korean War, the North Korean railway system was restructured, which included the rearrangement of several rail lines. This included the division of the Hamgyeong Line into three parts.

The Cheongjin−Hoeryeong–Sambong (formerly Sangsambong) section of the Hamgyeong Line inherited from Sentetsu was merged with the former Sambong−Namyang North Chosen West Line, the Namyang−Unggi section of the North Chosen East Line, and the Unggi−Najin Ungna Line inherited from Mantetsu to create the new Hambuk Line running from Cheongjin to Najin via Namyang. The Namyang−Tumen cross-border section of the North Chosen East Line was split off to create the Namyang Gukgyeong Line.

The Gowon−Geumya (formerly Yeongheung) section of the Hamgyeong Line was merged with the Pyeongyang−Gowon Pyeongwon Line and the partially completed Cheongjin−Rajin Cheongna Line to create the P'yŏngra Line from Pyeongyang to Najin.

The partition of Korea left the Pyeonggang−Wonsan section of Sentetsu's Gyeongwon Line in the DPRK; this was then merged with the Wonsan−Gowon section of the former Hamgyeong line to create the Pyeonggang−Wonsan−Gowon Kangwŏn Line.

Section	Length	Opened	Original owner	Line to 1928	1929	1933	1934	1941	1945
Wonsan–Muncheon	20.0 km	1 August 1915	Sentetsu	Hamgyeong Line	Hamgyeong Main Line	Hamgyeong Main Line	Hamgyeong Main Line	Hamgyeong Line	Hamgyeong Line
Muncheon–Yeongheung	34.4 km	21 July 1916	Sentetsu	Hamgyeong Line	Hamgyeong Main Line	Hamgyeong Main Line	Hamgyeong Main Line	Hamgyeong Line	Hamgyeong Line
Yeongheung–Hamheung	69.5 km	15 December 1919	Mantetsu	Hamgyeong Line (Sentetsu after 1925)	Hamgyeong Main Line	Hamgyeong Main Line	Hamgyeong Main Line	Hamgyeong Line	Hamgyeong Line
Hamheung–Seohojin	18.0 km	1 December 1922	Mantetsu	Hamgyeong Line (Sentetsu after 1925)	Hamgyeong Main Line	Hamgyeong Main Line	Hamgyeong Main Line	Hamgyeong Line	Hamgyeong Line
Seohojin–Toejo	18.4 km	25 September 1923	Mantetsu	Hamgyeong Line (Sentetsu after 1925)	Hamgyeong Main Line	Hamgyeong Main Line	Hamgyeong Main Line	Hamgyeong Line	Hamgyeong Line
Toejo–Yanghwa	58.0 km	11 October 1924	Mantetsu	Hamgyeong Line (Sentetsu after 1925)	Hamgyeong Main Line	Hamgyeong Main Line	Hamgyeong Main Line	Hamgyeong Line	Hamgyeong Line
Yanghwa–Sokhu	14.1 km	1 November 1925	Sentetsu	Hamgyeong Line	Hamgyeong Main Line	Hamgyeong Main Line	Hamgyeong Main Line	Hamgyeong Line	Hamgyeong Line
Sokhu–Sinbukcheong	8.9 km	11 November 1926	Sentetsu	Hamgyeong Line	Hamgyeong Main Line	Hamgyeong Main Line	Hamgyeong Main Line	Hamgyeong Line	Hamgyeong Line
Sinbukcheong–Geosan	13.6 km	1 December 1927	Sentetsu	Hamgyeong Line	Hamgyeong Main Line	Hamgyeong Main Line	Hamgyeong Main Line	Hamgyeong Line	Hamgyeong Line
Geosan–Gunseon	26.1 km	1 September 1928	Sentetsu	Hamgyeong Line	Hamgyeong Main Line	Hamgyeong Main Line	Hamgyeong Main Line	Hamgyeong Line	Hamgyeong Line
Gunseon–Dancheon	31.5 km	1 December 1927	Sentetsu	Hamgyeong Line	Hamgyeong Main Line	Hamgyeong Main Line	Hamgyeong Main Line	Hamgyeong Line	Hamgyeong Line
Dancheon–Kilju	84.7 km	11 October 1924	Mantetsu	Hamgyeong Line (Sentetsu after 1925)	Hamgyeong Main Line	Hamgyeong Main Line	Hamgyeong Main Line	Hamgyeong Line	Hamgyeong Line
Kilju–Ryongdong	39.4 km	1 December 1927	Sentetsu	Hamgyeong Line	Hamgyeong Main Line	Hamgyeong Main Line	Hamgyeong Main Line	Hamgyeong Line	Hamgyeong Line
Ryongdong–Geukdong	8.1 km	10 June 1927	Sentetsu	Hamgyeong Line	Hamgyeong Main Line	Hamgyeong Main Line	Hamgyeong Main Line	Hamgyeong Line	Hamgyeong Line
Geukdong–Ponggang	17.3 km	1 December 1926	Sentetsu	Hamgyeong Line	Hamgyeong Main Line	Hamgyeong Main Line	Hamgyeong Main Line	Hamgyeong Line	Hamgyeong Line
Ponggang–Jueul	39.5 km	11 October 1924	Mantetsu	Hamgyeong Line (Sentetsu after 1925)	Hamgyeong Main Line	Hamgyeong Main Line	Hamgyeong Main Line	Hamgyeong Line	Hamgyeong Line
Jueul–Ranam	21.0 km	11 November 1920	Mantetsu	Hamgyeong Line (Sentetsu after 1925)	Hamgyeong Main Line	Hamgyeong Main Line	Hamgyeong Main Line	Hamgyeong Line	Hamgyeong Line
Ranam−Cheongjin	13.1 km	10 December 1919	Mantetsu	Hamgyeong Line (Sentetsu after 1925)	Hamgyeong Main Line	Hamgyeong Main Line	Hamgyeong Main Line	Hamgyeong Line	Hamgyeong Line
Ranam–Suseong (new alignment)		1 December 1941	Sentetsu	-	-	-	-	-	Gangdeok Line
Cheongjin−Changpyeong	55.7 km	5 November 1916	Sentetsu	Hamgyeong Line	Cheongjin Line	Cheongjin Line	Cheongjin Line (Mantetsu 1934−1940)	Hamgyeong Line	Hamgyeong Line
Changpyeong–Pungsan	13.4 km	16 September 1917	Mantetsu	Hamgyeong Line (Sentetsu after 1925)	Cheongjin Line	Cheongjin Line	Cheongjin Line (Mantetsu 1934−1940)	Hamgyeong Line	Hamgyeong Line
Pungsan–Hoeryeong	24.7 km	25 November 1917	Mantetsu	Hamgyeong Line (Sentetsu after 1925)	Cheongjin Line	Cheongjin Line	Cheongjin Line (Mantetsu 1934−1940)	Hamgyeong Line (Sentetsu)	Hamgyeong Line (Sentetsu)
Hoeryeong−Sangsambong	40.4 km	5 January 1920	Domun Railway	Domun Railway	West Tomun Line (Sentetsu)	Domun Line (Sentetsu)	Cheongjin Line (Mantetsu 1934-1940)	Hamgyeong Line (Sentetsu)	Hamgyeong Line (Sentetsu)

== Route ==
Stations as of 1945
Distance		Station name					
Total; km	S2S; km	Transcribed, Korean	Transcribed, Japanese	Hunminjeongeum	Hanja/Kanji	Opening date Original owner	Connections
0.0	0.0	Wonsan	Genzan	원산	元山	1 August 1915; Sentetsu	Sentetsu Gyeongbu Line; Sentetsu Gyeongwon Line
5.5	5.5	Deokwon	Tokugen	덕원	德源	1 August 1915; Sentetsu	
12.6	7.1	Munpyeong	Bunhei	문평	文坪	1 August 1915; Sentetsu	
20.0	7.4	Muncheon	Bunsen	문천	文川	21 July 1916; Sentetsu	Chosen Anthracite Company Koam Line (opened 17 December 1943)
29.9	9.9	Yongdam	Ryōtan	용담	龍潭	21 July 1916; Sentetsu	Sentetsu Cheonnaeri Line (opened 1 November 1927)
34.5	4.6	Jeontan	Sentan	전탄	箭灘	21 July 1916; Sentetsu	
42.0	7.5	Gowon	Kōgen	고원	高原	21 July 1916; Sentetsu	Sentetsu Pyeongwon Line (opened 16 December 1937)
47.0	5.0	Hyeonheung	Genkō	현흥	玄興	21 July 1916; Sentetsu	
54.4	7.4	Yeongheung	Yōkō	영흥	永興	21 July 1916; Sentetsu	
62.8	8.4	Majang	Bajō	마장	馬場	15 December 1919; Mantetsu	
70.1	7.3	Beompo	Honho	범포	范浦	15 December 1919; Mantetsu	
77.7	7.6	Wangjang	Ōjō	왕장	旺場	15 December 1919; Mantetsu	
82.5	4.8	Munbong	Bunhō	문봉	文峰	15 December 1919; Mantetsu	
87.0	6.5	Sinsang	Shinjō	신상	新上	15 December 1919; Mantetsu	
93.8	6.8	Bupyeong	Fuhei	부평	富坪	15 December 1919; Mantetsu	
103.5	9.7	Jeongpyeong	Jōhei	정평	定平	15 December 1919; Mantetsu	
111.7	8.2	Hamnam Heungsang	Kannan Kōjō	함남흥상	咸南興上	15 December 1919; Mantetsu	
123.9	12.2	Hamheung	Kankō	함흥	咸興	15 December 1919; Mantetsu	Sinheung Railway Hamnam Line (opened 10 June 1923); Sinheung Railway Namheung Line (opened 11 May 1934)
132.7	8.8	Bongung	Hongū	본궁	本宮	1 December 1922; Mantetsu	
139.3	6.6	Heungnam	Kōnan	흥남	興南	1 December 1922; Mantetsu	
141.9	2.6	Seohojin	Seikoshin	서호진	西湖津	1 December 1922; Mantetsu	Sinheung Railway Namheung Line (opened 15 December 1936)
146.4	4.5	Majeon	Maden	마전	麻田	25 September 1923; Mantetsu	
156.1	9.7	Yeoho	Ryoko	여호	呂湖	25 September 1923; Mantetsu	
160.3	4.2	Toejo	Taichō	퇴조	退潮	25 September 1923; Mantetsu	
165.6	5.3	Sepori	Saifuri	세포리	細浦里	11 October 1924; Mantetsu	
173.4	7.8	Samho	Sanko	삼호	三湖	11 October 1924; Mantetsu	
181.5	8.1	Yong'un	Ryōun	용운	龍雲	11 October 1924; Mantetsu	
186.5	5.0	Jeonjin	Zenshin	전진	前津	11 October 1924; Mantetsu	
192.5	6.0	Gyeongpo	Keiho	경포	景浦	11 October 1924; Mantetsu	
199.9	7.4	Unpo	Unho	운포	雲浦	11 October 1924; Mantetsu	
203.5	3.6	Jungho	Chūko	중호	中湖	11 October 1924; Mantetsu	
205.8	2.3	Yeongmu	Reibu	영무	靈武	11 October 1924; Mantetsu	
212.3	6.5	Sinpo	Shinho	신포	新浦	11 October 1924; Mantetsu	
218.3	6.0	Yanghwa	Yōka	양화	陽化	11 October 1924; Mantetsu	
225.4	7.1	Gangsangni	Kōjōri	강상리	江上里	1 November 1925; Sentetsu	
232.4	7.0	Sokhu	Zokugu	속후	俗厚	1 November 1925; Sentetsu	
241.3	8.9	Sinbukcheong	Shinhokushō	신북청	新北靑	11 November 1926; Sentetsu	Sentetsu Bukcheong Line (opened 20 September 1929)
246.7	5.4	Sinchang	Shinshō	신창	新昌	1 December 1927; Sentetsu	
254.9	8.2	Geosan	Kyozan	거산	居山	1 December 1927; Sentetsu	
260.0	5.1	Geonja	Kanji	건자	乾自	1 December 1927; Sentetsu	
263.8	3.8	Naheung	Nakō	나흥	羅興	1 December 1927; Sentetsu	Sentetsu Cheolsan Line (opened 20 September 1929)
267.1	3.3	Jeungsan	Sōzan	증산	曾山	1 December 1927; Sentetsu	Sentetsu Chaho Line (opened 20 September 1929)
273.9	6.9	Yeombun	Enbon	염분	鹽盆	1 December 1927; Sentetsu	
277.3	3.4	Iwon	Rigen	이원	利原	1 December 1927; Sentetsu	
281.0	3.7	Gunseon	Gunsen	군선	群仙	1 December 1927; Sentetsu	
286.4	5.4	Ssangam	Sōgan	쌍암	雙巖	1 December 1927; Sentetsu	
291.4	5.0	Gokgu	Kokkō	곡구	谷口	1 December 1927; Sentetsu	
296.3	4.9	Giam	Kigan	기암	奇巖	1 December 1927; Sentetsu	
302.2	5.9	Yonggang	Ryōkō	용강	龍崗	1 December 1927; Sentetsu	
307.8	5.6	Omongni	Gomuri	오몽리	五夢里	1 December 1927; Sentetsu	
312.5	4.7	Dancheon	Tansen	단천	端川	1 December 1927; Sentetsu	Danpung Railway Danpung Line
321.1	8.6	Yeohaejin	Nyokaishin	여해진	汝海津	11 October 1924; Mantetsu	Chosen Magnesite Development Railway Hamnam Line
328.3	7.2	Yongdae	Ryūtai	용대	龍臺	11 October 1924; Mantetsu	
335.1	6.8	Ilsin	Nisshin	일신	日新	11 October 1924; Mantetsu	
342.8	7.7	Manchun	Banshun	만춘	晩春	11 October 1924; Mantetsu	
348.5	5.7	Ssangnyong	Sōryō	쌍룡	雙龍	11 October 1924; Mantetsu	
354.9	6.4	Seongjin	Seishin	성진	城津	11 October 1924; Mantetsu	
361.2	6.3	Sinseongjin	Shinseishin	신성진	新城津	11 October 1924; Mantetsu	
363.9	2.7	Nongseong	Nōsei	농성	農城	11 October 1924; Mantetsu	
368.3	5.4	Hakjung	Gakuchū	학중	鶴中	11 October 1924; Mantetsu	
375.7	7.4	Eob'eok	Gōoku	업억	業億	11 October 1924; Mantetsu	
381.6	5.9	Wonpyeong	Enhei	원평	院坪	11 October 1924; Mantetsu	
389.6	8.0	Nodong	Rodō	노동	蘆洞	11 October 1924; Mantetsu	
397.2	7.6	Gilju	Kisshū	길주	吉州	11 October 1924; Mantetsu	Sentetsu Gilhye Line (opened 1 November 1933)
404.8	7.6	Geumsong	Kinshō	금송	金松	1 December 1927; Sentetsu	
408.8	4.0	Onsupyeong	Onsuihei	온수평	溫水坪	1 December 1927; Sentetsu	
414.9	6.1	Gocham	Kotan	고참	古站	1 December 1927; Sentetsu	Sentetsu Gocham Colliery Line (opened 1937)
423.6	8.7	Naepo	Naiho	내포	內浦	1 December 1927; Sentetsu	
428.1	4.5	Myeongcheon	Meisen	명천	明川	1 December 1927; Sentetsu	
432.1	4.0	Sangnyongjeon	Jōryōden	상룡전	上龍田	1 December 1927; Sentetsu	
436.6	4.5	Yongdong	Ryōdō	용동	龍洞	1 December 1927; Sentetsu	
441.4	4.8	Yeong'an	Eian	영안	永安	10 June 1927; Sentetsu	
444.7	3.3	Geukdong	Gokudō	극동	極洞	10 June 1927; Sentetsu	
451.2	6.5	Jomaksan	Zōmakusen	조막산	造幕山	1 December 1926; Sentetsu	
462.0	10.8	Bonggang	Bukō	봉강	鳳岡	1 December 1926; Sentetsu	
470.8	8.8	Eodaejin	Gyodaishin	어대진	漁大津	11 October 1924; Mantetsu	
480.1	9.3	Hoemun	Kaibun	회문	會文	11 October 1924; Mantetsu	
489.7	9.6	Yonghyeon	Ryūken	용현	龍峴	11 October 1924; Mantetsu	
496.9	7.2	Jueul	Shuitsu	주을	朱乙	11 November 1920; Mantetsu	
501.5	4.6	Saenggiryong	Seikiryō	생기령	生氣嶺	11 November 1920; Mantetsu	
509.6	8.1	Gyeongseong	Kyōjō	경성	鏡城	11 November 1920; Mantetsu	
517.9	8.3	Nanam	Ranan	나남	羅南	10 December 1919; Mantetsu	Sentetsu Gangdeok Line (opened 1 December 1941)
		Cheongjin Jochajang	Seishin Sōshajō	청진조차장	清津操車場	10 December 1919; Mantetsu	(to Gangdeok Line in 1941)
525.9	2.1	Cheongjin Seohang	Seishin Seikō	청진서항	淸津西港	10 December 1919; Mantetsu	
528.3	2.4	Cheongjin Eohang	Seishin Gyokō	청진어항	淸津漁港	10 December 1919; Mantetsu	
531.0	2.7	Cheongjin	Seishin	청진	淸津	5 November 1916; Sentetsu	Sentetsu Cheongjin Wharf Line (opened 1 July 1940)
538.8	7.8	Suseong	Sujō	수성	輸城	5 November 1916; Sentetsu	Sentetsu Gangdeok Line (opened 1 December 1941)
544.4	5.6	Seongmak	Sekimaku	석막	石幕	5 November 1916; Sentetsu	
552.2	7.8	Jangheung	Shōkō	장흥	章興	5 November 1916; Sentetsu	
566.7	14.5	Buryeong	Funei	부령	富寧	5 November 1916; Sentetsu	
573.0	6.3	Gomusan	Komosan	고무산	古茂山	5 November 1916; Sentetsu	Chosen Railway Hambuk Line (20 August 1927 – 1 April 1944); Sentetsu Musan Line (from 1 April 1944)
585.5	12.5	Changpyeong	Sōhei	창평	蒼坪	5 November 1916; Sentetsu	
592.8	7.3	Jeongori	Zengori	전거리	全巨里	5 November 1916; Sentetsu	
598.9	6.1	Pungsan	Hōzan	풍산	豊山	16 September 1917; Mantetsu	
610.5	11.6	Jungdo	Chūdō	중도	中島	25 November 1917; Mantetsu	
616.5	6.0	Daedeok	Daitoku	대덕	大德	25 November 1917; Mantetsu	
623.6	7.1	Hoeryeong	Kainei	회령	會寧	25 November 1917; Mantetsu	Sentetsu Hoeryeong Colliery Line
624.5	0.9	Sinhoeryeong	Shinkainei	신회령	新会寧	5 January 1920; Domun Railway	
627.3	2.8	Geumsaeng	Kinsei	금생	金生	5 January 1920; Domun Railway	
633.0	5.7	Goryeongjin	Kōreichin	고령진	高嶺鎭	5 January 1920; Domun Railway	
638.4	5.4	Sinhakpo	Shingakuho	신학포	新鶴浦	5 January 1920; Domun Railway	
641.3	2.9	Hakpo	Gakuho	학포	鶴浦	5 January 1920; Domun Railway	
650.7	9.4	Sinjeon	Shinden	신전	新田	5 January 1920; Domun Railway	
657.1	6.4	Ganpyeong	Kanhei	간평	間坪	5 January 1920; Domun Railway	
664.0	6.9	Sangsambong	Jōsanhō	상삼봉	上三峰	5 January 1920; Domun Railway	Mantetsu North Chosen Line (opened 1 December 1922); Manchukuo National Railway Chaokai Line (opened March 1934)
