= Charyong station =

Railway station in North Korea

Ch'aryŏng 차령

Korean name
- Hangul: 차령역
- Hanja: 車嶺驛
- Revised Romanization: Charyeong-yeok
- McCune–Reischauer: Ch'aryŏng-yŏk

General information
- Location: Puryŏng, North Hamgyŏng; North Korea
- Coordinates: 42.1607°N 129.5554°E
- Owner: Korean State Railway

History
- Opened: 20 August 1927

Services
Preceding station	Korean State Railway	Following station
Kŭmp'ae towards Musan	Musan Line	P'yemusan towards Komusan
Location

Ch'aryŏng station is a railway station in Puryŏng county, North Hamgyŏng province, North Korea, on the Musan Line of the Korean State Railway.

It was opened, along with the rest of the Komusan–Sinch'am section of the Musan line, on 20 August 1927.

Local passenger trains running between Musan and Ch'ŏngjin on the southern junction of the Hambuk and P'yŏngra lines serve this station, and there are several daily commuter trains for workers and students between Musan and Komusan.
