= Pyemusan station =

Railway station in North Korea

P'yemusan 폐무산

Korean name
- Hangul: 폐무산역
- Hanja: 廢茂山驛
- Revised Romanization: Pyemusan-yeok
- McCune–Reischauer: P'yemusan-yŏk

General information
- Location: Puryŏng, North Hamgyŏng; North Korea
- Coordinates: 42.1768°N 129.6029°E
- Owner: Korean State Railway

History
- Opened: 20 August 1927

Services
Preceding station	Korean State Railway	Following station
Ch'aryŏng towards Musan	Musan Line	Musu towards Komusan
Location

P'yemusan station is a railway station in Puryŏng, North Hamgyŏng province, North Korea, on the Musan Line of the Korean State Railway.

It was opened, along with the rest of the Komusan–Sinch'am section of the Musan line, on 20 August 1927.

Local passenger trains running between Musan and Ch'ŏngjin on the southern junction of the Hambuk and P'yŏngra lines serve this station, and there are several daily commuter trains for workers and students between Musan and Komusan.
