= Kumpae station =

Railway station in North Korea

Kŭmp'ae 금패

Korean name
- Hangul: 금패역
- Hanja: 金佩驛
- Revised Romanization: Geumpae-yeok
- McCune–Reischauer: Kŭmp'ae-yŏk

General information
- Location: Musan, North Hamgyŏng; North Korea
- Coordinates: 42.1351°N 129.4733°E
- Owner: Korean State Railway

History
- Opened: 20 August 1927

Services
Preceding station	Korean State Railway	Following station
Sinch'am towards Musan	Musan Line	Ch'aryŏng towards Komusan
Location

Kŭmp'ae station is a railway station in Musan county, North Hamgyŏng province, North Korea, on the Musan Line of the Korean State Railway.

It was opened, along with the rest of the Komusan–Sinch'am section of the Musan line, on 20 August 1927.

Local passenger trains running between Musan and Ch'ŏngjin on the southern junction of the Hambuk and P'yŏngra lines serve this station, and there are several daily commuter trains for workers and students between Musan and Komusan.
