= Sopungsan station =

Railway station in North Korea

Sŏp'ungsan 서풍산

Korean name
- Hangul: 서풍산역
- Hanja: 西豊山驛
- Revised Romanization: Pungsan-yeok
- McCune–Reischauer: P'ungsan-yŏk

General information
- Location: P'ungsal-li, Musan, North Hamgyŏng; North Korea
- Coordinates: 42.1522°N 129.3690°E
- Owner: Korean State Railway

History
- Opened: 15 November 1929

Services
Preceding station	Korean State Railway	Following station
Chuch'o towards Musan	Musan Line	Sinch'am towards Komusan
Location

Sŏp'ungsan station is a railway station in P'ungsal-li, Musan county, North Hamgyŏng province, North Korea, on the Musan Line of the Korean State Railway.

It was opened, along with the rest of the Sinch'am–Musan section of the Musan line, on 15 November 1929.

Local passenger trains running between Musan and Ch'ŏngjin on the southern junction of the Hambuk and P'yŏngra lines serve this station, and there are several daily commuter trains for workers and students between Musan and Komusan.
