= Cholsong Chongnyon station =

Railway station in North Korea

Ch'ŏlsong Ch'ŏngnyŏn 철송청년

Korean name
- Hangul: 철송청년역
- Hanja: 鐵松靑年驛
- Revised Romanization: Cheolsongcheongnyeon-yeok
- McCune–Reischauer: Ch'ŏlsongch'ŏngnyŏn-yŏk

General information
- Location: Ch'ŏlsong-ri, Musan, North Hamgyŏng; North Korea
- Coordinates: 42°12′47″N 129°17′45″E
- Owner: Korean State Railway

History
- Opened: 15 November 1929
- Former names: Chinhwa station
- Original company: Chosen Railway

Services
Preceding station	Korean State Railway	Following station
Musan Ch'ŏlsan towards Musan	Musan Line	Chuch'o towards Komusan
Terminus	Musan Mining Line	Musan Kwangsan Terminus
Location

Ch'ŏlsong Ch'ŏngnyŏn station is a railway station in Ch'ŏlsong-ri, Musan county, North Hamgyŏng province, North Korea, on the Musan Line of the Korean State Railway. It is also the starting point of the freight-only Musan Mining Branch to Musan Kwangsan station.

There is a locomotive depot located here.

== History ==
Originally called Chinhwa station (Chosŏn'gŭl: 진화역; Hanja: 珍貨駅), it was opened by the Chosen Railway on 15 November 1929, along with the rest of the Sinch'am–Musan section of the Musan Line.

== Services ==
Local passenger trains running between Musan and Ch'ŏngjin on the southern junction of the Hambuk and P'yŏngra lines serve this station, and there are several daily commuter trains for workers between Musan and Ch'ŏlsong and for students between Musan and Komusan. In addition, two daily pairs of local trains, 662/663 and 668/669, operate between Musan and Chuch'o.
