= Sosang station =

Railway station in North Korea

Sŏsang 서상

Korean name
- Hangul: 서상역
- Hanja: 西上驛
- Revised Romanization: Seosang-yeok
- McCune–Reischauer: Sŏsang-yŏk

General information
- Location: Puryŏng, North Hamgyŏng; North Korea
- Coordinates: 42.1519°N 129.6982°E
- Owner: Korean State Railway

History
- Opened: 20 August 1927

Services
Preceding station	Korean State Railway	Following station
Musu towards Musan	Musan Line	Komusan Terminus
Location

Sŏsang station is a railway station in Puryŏng, North Hamgyŏng province, North Korea, on the Musan Line of the Korean State Railway.

It was opened, along with the rest of the Komusan–Sinch'am section of the Musan line, on 20 August 1927.

Local passenger trains running between Musan and Ch'ŏngjin on the southern junction of the Hambuk and P'yŏngra lines serve this station, and there are several daily commuter trains for workers and students between Musan and Komusan.
