= Musan Cholsan station =

Railway station in North Korea

Musan Ch'ŏlsan 무산철산

Korean name
- Hangul: 무산철산역
- Hanja: 茂山鉄山驛
- Revised Romanization: Musan Cheolsan-yeok
- McCune–Reischauer: Musan Ch'ŏlsan-yŏk

General information
- Location: Musan, North Hamgyŏng; North Korea
- Coordinates: 42.2239°N 129.2568°E
- Owner: Korean State Railway

History
- Opened: 1 February 1937

Services
| Preceding station | Korean State Railway | Following station |
|---|---|---|
| Musan Terminus | Musan Line | Ch'ŏlsong Ch'ŏngnyŏn towards Komusan |
Location

Musan Ch'ŏlsan station is a railway station in Musan county, North Hamgyŏng province, North Korea, on the Musan Line of the Korean State Railway.

Although the Sinch'am–Musan section of the Musan line was opened on 15 November 1929, this station was not opened until 1 February 1937.

Local passenger trains running between Musan and Ch'ŏngjin on the southern junction of the Hambuk and P'yŏngra lines serve this station, and there are several daily commuter trains for workers and students between Musan and Komusan. In addition, two daily pairs of local trains, 662/663 and 668/669, operate between Musan and Church'o.
