= North Chosen Colonial Railway =

Japanese company in colonial Korea

North Chōsen Colonial Railway Co. Ltd.
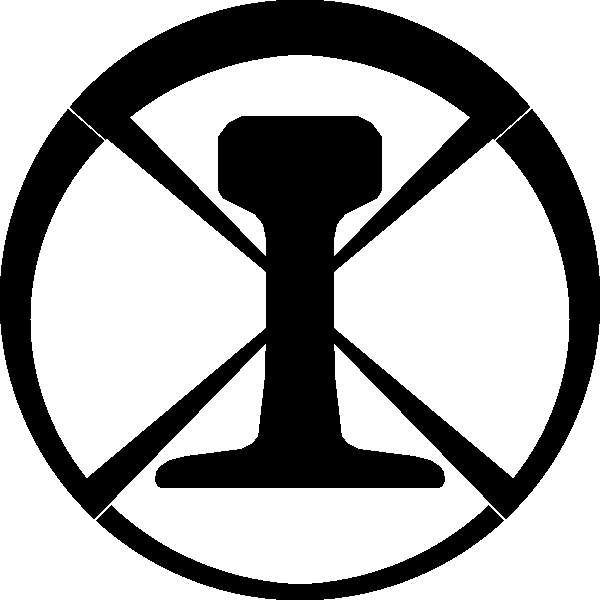

Overview
- Native name: 북선척식철도주식회사 (Bukseon Cheoksik Cheoldo Jusikhoesa) 北鮮拓殖鐵道株式會社 (Hokusen Takushoku Tetsudō Kabushiki Kaisha)

The North Chōsen Colonial Railway (Japanese: 北鮮拓殖鐵道株式會社, Hokusen Takushoku Tetsudō Kabushiki Kaisha; Korean: 북선척식철도주식회사, Bukseon Cheoksik Cheoldo Jusikhoesa) was a privately owned railway company in Japanese-occupied Korea.

== History ==
In order to exploit the rich iron deposits of the Musan region, the Chōsen Railway established the North Chōsen Colonial Railway as a subsidiary company and began construction of a new line, calling it the Hambuk Line (not to be confused with the current Hambuk Line, which at that time was part of the Chosen Government Railway's (Sentetsu) Hamgyeong Line). The line was opened in two parts - the Gomusan-Hambuk Sincham section opening on 20 August 1927, and the Sinch'am-Musan segment opening on 15 November 1929. On 1 February 1937, Musan Cheolsan Station was opened.

Originally built as a narrow-gauge line, the conversion to standard gauge was completed on 1 May 1940, and the extension to Musan Gangan station was completed then as well. On 1 April 1944, the line was absorbed into Sentetsu; at the same time, the line was given its current name, Musan Line, and the extension to Musan Gangan station was closed.

After the partition of Korea the line was within the territory of the DPRK, and was nationalised by the Provisional People's Committee for North Korea along with all other railways in the Soviet zone of occupation on 10 August 1946; the line retained the name given it by Sentetsu, Musan Line.

== Services ==
In the last timetable issued prior to the start of the Pacific War in November 1942, the North Chōsen Colonial Railway was operating four daily round trip passenger trains between Gomusan and Musan, timed to connect with local and express services on Sentetsu's Hamgyeong Line.

Gomusan - Musan
Distance (read down)	2nd Class Korean yen	3rd Class Korean yen	1	3	5	7	Station name	Distance (read up)	2nd Class Korean yen	3rd Class Korean yen	2	4	6	8
0.0	-	-	07:00	10:00	14:50	19:00	Gomusan	57.9	4.70	2.35	08:58	12:30	17:29	19:46
33.6	2.80	1.40	08:52	11:51	16:42	20:54	Hambuk Sincham	24.3	1.97	1.00	07:24	10:56	15:55	18:11
50.5	4.10	2.05	09:32	12:31	17:30	21:34	Chinhwa	7.4	0.60	0.30	06:30	10:01	14:58	17:16
57.9	4.70	2.35	09:49	12:47	17:48	21:50	Musan	0.0	-	-	06:00	09:30	14:30	16:45

== Motive power ==
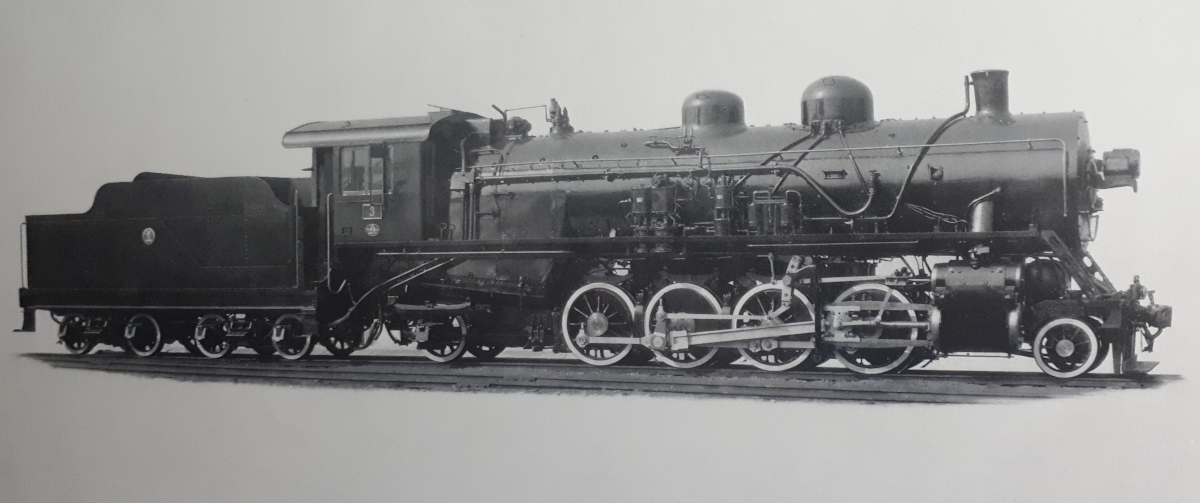
Locomotive number 3 of the North Chosen Colonial Railway

Prior to the conversion of the line to standard gauge, locomotives on the line included Class 810 locomotives of the Chōsen Railway. After it was converted to standard gauge, the primary power on the line was twenty-two heavy 2-8-2 steam locomotives identical to the South Manchuria Railway's Mikai class engines. Built by Kisha Seizō of Japan, they were numbered 1 through 22.

After the North Chosen Colonial Railway was nationalised, these locomotives were taken over by Sentetsu, but their subsequent numbering is unknown.

Road number	Year	Builder	Works number
1	1940	Kisha Seizō	1891
2	1940	Kisha Seizō	1892
3	1940	Kisha Seizō	1893
4	1940	Kisha Seizō	1894
5	1940	Kisha Seizō	1895
6	1940	Kisha Seizō	1987
7	1940	Kisha Seizō	1988
8	1940	Kisha Seizō	1989
9	1940	Kisha Seizō	1990
10	1940	Kisha Seizō	1991
11	1940	Kisha Seizō	1992
12	1941	Kisha Seizō	2100
13	1941	Kisha Seizō	2101
14	1941	Kisha Seizō	2102
15	1941	Kisha Seizō	2103
16	1941	Kisha Seizō	2104
17	1942	Kisha Seizō	2203
18	1942	Kisha Seizō	2204
19	1942	Kisha Seizō	2205
20	1942	Kisha Seizō	2206
21	1942	Kisha Seizō	2207
22	1942	Kisha Seizō	2208

== Route ==
Distance		Station name					
Total; km	S2S; km	Transcribed, Korean	Transcribed, Japanese	Hunminjeongeum	Hanja/Kanji	Opened	Connections
0.0	0.0	Komusan	Komozan	고무산	古茂山	20 August 1927	Sentetsu Hamgyeong Line
4.2	4.2	Seosang	Seijō	서상	西上	20 August 1927	
8.9	4.7	Musu	Bushū	무수	舞袖	20 August 1927	
14.5	5.6	Pyemusan	Haimozan	폐무산	廃茂山	20 August 1927	
18.9	4.4	Charyeong	Sharei	차령	車嶺	20 August 1927	
22.6	3.7	Geumpae	Kinpai	금패	金佩	20 August 1927	
33.6	11.0	Hambuk Sincham	Kanboku-Shintan	함북신참	咸北新站	20 August 1927	
39.4	5.8	Seopungsan	Seihōzan	서풍산	西豊山	15 November 1929	
45.7	6.3	Jucho	Shusō	주초	朱草	15 November 1929	
50.5	4.8	Chinhwa	Chinka	진화	珍貨	15 November 1929	
54.3	3.8	Musan Cheolsan	Mōzan-Tetsuzan	무산철산	茂山鉄山	15 November 1929	
57.9	3.6	Musan	Mōzan	무산	茂山	15 November 1929	Sentetsu Baengmu Line (opened 1944)
60.4	2.5	Musan Kang'an	Mōzan-Kōgan	무산강안	茂山江岸	1 February 1937; Closed 1944	
