= Chucho station =

Railway station in North Korea

Chuch'o 주초

Korean name
- Hangul: 주초역
- Hanja: 朱草驛
- Revised Romanization: Jucho-yeok
- McCune–Reischauer: Chuch'o-yŏk

General information
- Location: Chuch'o-rodongjagu, Musan, North Hamgyŏng; North Korea
- Coordinates: 42.1868°N 129.3218°E
- Owner: Korean State Railway

History
- Opened: 15 November 1929

Services
Preceding station	Korean State Railway	Following station
Ch'ŏlsong Ch'ŏngnyŏn towards Musan	Musan Line	West P'ungsan towards Komusan
Location

Chuch'o station is a railway station in Chucho'o-rodongjagu, Musan county, North Hamgyŏng province, North Korea, on the Musan Line of the Korean State Railway.

It was opened, along with the rest of the Sinch'am–Musan section of the Musan line, on 15 November 1929.

Local passenger trains running between Musan and Ch'ŏngjin on the southern junction of the Hambuk and P'yŏngra lines serve this station, and there are several daily commuter trains for workers and students between Musan and Komusan. In addition, two daily pairs of local trains, 662/663 and 668/669, operate between Musan and Chuch'o.
