= Songmak station =

Railway station in North Korea

Sŏngmak 석막

Korean name
- Hangul: 석막역
- Hanja: 石幕驛
- Revised Romanization: Seongmak-yeok
- McCune–Reischauer: Sŏngmak-yŏk

General information
- Location: Sŏngmang-rodongjagu, Puryŏng, North Hamgyŏng; North Korea
- Coordinates: 41.8784°N 129.7309°E
- Owner: Korean State Railway

History
- Opened: 5 November 1916

Services
Preceding station	Korean State Railway	Following station
Ch'anghŭng towards Rajin	Hambuk Line	Susŏng towards Ch'ŏngjin Ch'ŏngnyŏn
Location

Sŏngmak station is a railway station in Sŏngmang-rodongjagu, Puryŏng county, North Hamgyŏng, North Korea, on the Hambuk Line of the Korean State Railway.

It was opened on 5 November 1916 together with the rest of the Ch'ŏngjin–Ch'angp'yŏng section of the former Hamgyŏng Line.
