= Musan Kwangsan station =

Railway station in North Korea

Musan Kwangsan 무산광산

Korean name
- Hangul: 무산광산역
- Hanja: 茂山鑛山驛
- Revised Romanization: Musan Gwangsan-yeok
- McCune–Reischauer: Musan Kwangsan-yŏk

General information
- Location: Musan-gun, North Hamgyŏng; North Korea
- Owner: Korean State Railway

History
- Opened: 1971

Services
Preceding station	Korean State Railway	Following station
Ch'ŏlsong Ch'ŏngnyŏn Terminus	Musan Mining Line	Terminus
Location

Musan Kwangsan station is a railway station in Musan County, North Hamgyŏng Province, North Korea. It is the terminus of the freight-only Musan Mining Line of the Korean State Railway's Musan Line.

== History ==
The station, together with the line, was opened in 1971 by the Korean State Railway.

== Services ==
Magnetite from the Musan Mining Complex destined for the Kim Chaek Steel Complex, the Ch'ŏngjin Steel Works, the Sŏngjin Steel Complex and for Namyang station for export to China, is loaded onto trains at this station.
