= Chongpyong station =

Railway station in North Korea

Chŏngp'yŏng 정평

Korean name
- Hangul: 정평역
- Hanja: 定平驛
- Revised Romanization: Jeongpyeong-yeok
- McCune–Reischauer: Chŏngp'yŏng-yŏk

General information
- Location: Chŏngp'yŏng-ŭp, Chŏngp'yŏng-gun; North Hamgyŏng; North Korea
- Coordinates: 39.7848°N 127.3988°E
- Owner: Korean State Railway

Services
| Preceding station | Korean State Railway | Following station |
|---|---|---|
| Pup'yŏng towards P'yŏngyang | P'yŏngra Line | Hamju towards Rajin |
Location

Chongp'yŏng station (Korean: 정평역) is a railway station in Chŏngp'yŏng-ŭp, Chŏngp'yŏng county, South Hamgyŏng province, North Korea. It is located on the P'yŏngra Line of the Korean State Railway.
