= 咸鏡南道 =

咸鏡南道 (Hamgyongnam-do) may refer to:

- South Hamgyong Province
- Kankyōnan-dō
