= Hakpo station =

Railway station in North Korea

Hakp'o 학포

Korean name
- Hangul: 학포역
- Hanja: 鶴浦驛
- Revised Romanization: Hakpo-yeok
- McCune–Reischauer: Hakp'o-yŏk

General information
- Location: Hakp'o-ri, Hoeryŏng-si, North Hamgyŏng; North Korea
- Coordinates: 42.5942°N 129.7585°E
- Owner: Korean State Railway

History
- Opened: 5 January 1920

Services
Preceding station	Korean State Railway	Following station
Sinjŏn towards Rajin	Hambuk Line	Sinhakp'o towards Ch'ŏngjin Ch'ŏngnyŏn
Location

Hakp'o station is a railway station in Hakp'o-ri, greater Hoeryŏng city, North Hamgyŏng, North Korea, on the Hambuk Line of the Korean State Railway.

== History ==
It was opened by the Tomun Railway Company on 5 January 1920, together with the rest of the Hoeryŏng–Sangsambong section of their line (Hoeryŏng–Tonggwanjin), which on 1 April 1929 was nationalised and became the West Tomun Line of the Chosen Government Railway.
