= Susong station =

Railway station in Chongjin, North Korea

Susŏng 수성

Korean name
- Hangul: 수성역
- Hanja: 輸城驛
- Revised Romanization: Suseong-yeok
- McCune–Reischauer: Susŏng-yŏk

General information
- Location: Susŏng-dong, Sŏngp'yŏng-guyŏk, Chŏngjin-si, North Hamgyŏng; North Korea
- Coordinates: 41.8324°N 129.7376°E
- Owner: Korean State Railway

History
- Opened: 5 November 1916
- Former names: Chosen Government Railway, South Manchuria Railway

Services
Preceding station	Korean State Railway	Following station
Sŏngmak towards Rajin	Hambuk Line	Ch'ŏngjin Ch'ŏngnyŏn Terminus
Terminus	Kangdŏk Line	Namgangdok Terminus
Location

Susŏng station is a railway station in Susŏng-dong, Sŏngp'yŏng-guyŏk, Ch'ŏngjin-si, North Hamgyŏng, North Korea, on the Hambuk Line of the Korean State Railway.

It was opened by the Chosen Government Railway on 5 November 1916 together with the rest of the Ch'ŏngjin–Ch'angp'yŏng section of the former Hamgyŏng Line.
