= Musan Kwangsan Line =

Railway line in North Korea

Musan Mining Line

Overview
- Other name(s): Musan Kwangsan Line
- Native name: 무산광산선 (茂山鑛山線)
- Status: Operational
- Owner: Korean State Railway
- Locale: Musan-gun, North Hamgyŏng
- Termini: Ch'ŏlsong Ch'ŏngnyŏn; Musan Kwangsan
- Stations: 2

Service
- Type: Heavy rail, Regional rail, Freight rail

History
- Opened: 1971

Technical
- Line length: 3.0 km (1.9 mi)
- Number of tracks: Single track
- Track gauge: 1,435 mm (4 ft 8 1/2 in) standard gauge

- Musan Kwangsan Line
- Chosŏn'gŭl: 무산광산선
- Hancha: 茂山鑛山線
- Revised Romanization: Musan Gwangsan-seon
- McCune–Reischauer: Musan Kwangsan-sŏn

The Musan Kwangsan Line, or Musan Mining Line is a non-electrified freight-only railway line of the Korean State Railway in Musan County, North Hamgyŏng Province, North Korea, running from Ch'ŏlsong on the Musan Line to Musan Kwangsan.

== History ==
The Musan Mining Line was opened by the Korean State Railway in 1971.

== Services ==
Most freight traffic on the line is magnetite from the Musan Mining Complex destined for the Kim Chaek Steel Complex, the Ch'ŏngjin Steel Works, the Sŏngjin Steel Complex and for Namyang Station for export to China.

== Route ==
A yellow background in the "Distance" box indicates that section of the line is not electrified.

Distance (km)		Station Name		Former Name		
Total	S2S	Transcribed	Chosŏn'gŭl (Hanja)	Transcribed	Chosŏn'gŭl (Hanja)	Connections
0.0	0.0	Ch'ŏlsong Ch'ŏngnyŏn	철송청년 (鐵松靑年)	Chinhwa	진화 (珍貨)	Musan Line
3.0	3.0	Musan Kwangsan	무산광산 (茂山鑛山)			
