= Hongwon County =

Hongwon County 홍원군
- County

Korean transcription(s)
  - Hanja: 洪原郡
  - McCune-Reischauer: Hongwŏn kun
  - Revised Romanization: Hongwon-gun
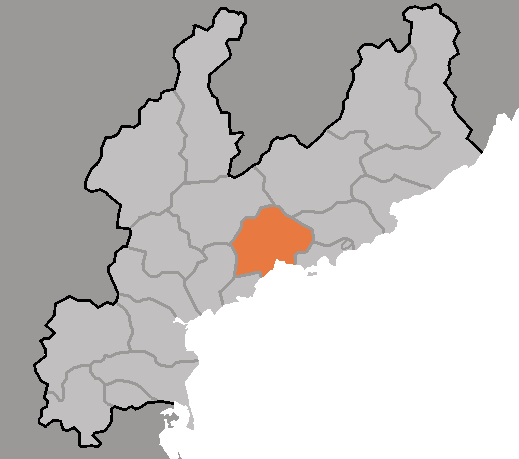
- Map of South Hamgyong showing the location of Hongwon
- Country: North Korea
- Province: South Hamgyong Province
- Administrative divisions: 1 ŭp, 4 workers' district, 27 ri

Area
  - Total: 905 km^{2} (349 sq mi)

Population (2008)
  - Total: 142,910
  - Density: 158/km^{2} (409/sq mi)

Hongwŏn County (Hongwon-gun) is a county in South Hamgyŏng province, North Korea. It is flanked by the Sea of Japan (East Sea of Korea) to the south, and by the Hamgyŏng Mountains to the north.

== Physical features ==
The northwest region is particularly mountainous. The highest peak is Palbong. The chief streams are the Tongdaech'ŏn (동대천) and Sŏdaech'ŏn (서대천). The coastal region is level. The temperature differs greatly from the coastline to the plains to the mountains. The mountains contribute to giving the county a mild climate.

== Administrative divisions ==
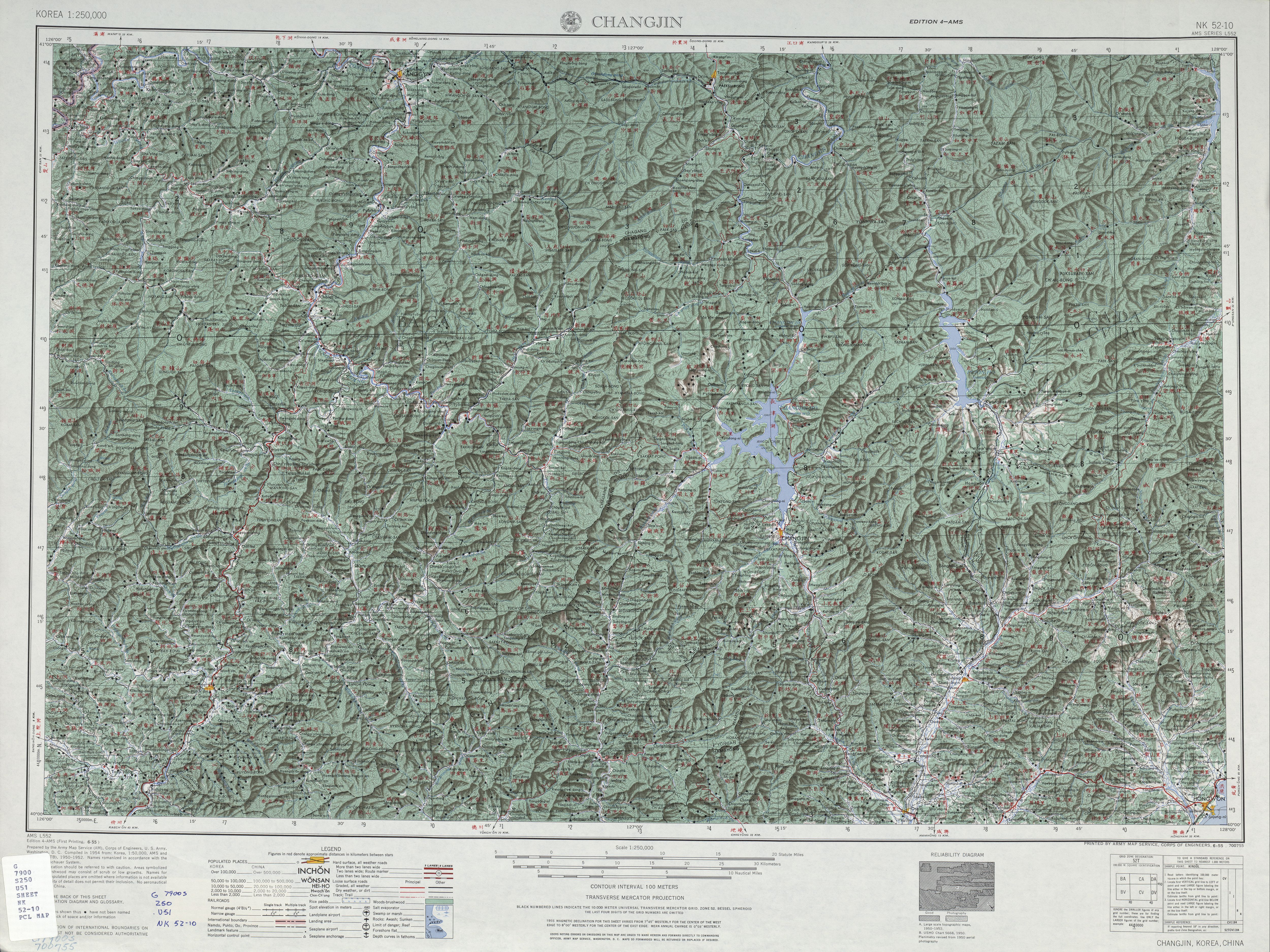
Map including Hongwŏn area and surrounding region (1954)

Hongwŏn county is divided into 1 ŭp (town), 4 rodongjagu (workers' districts) and 27 ri (villages):

- Hongwŏn-ŭp
- Chŏnjil-lodongjagu
- Kyŏngp'o-rodongjagu
- Namch'ŏl-lodongjagu
- Unp'o-rodongjagu
- Changp'ung-ri
- Chung'ŭl-li
- Chungsŏ-ri
- Haksong-ri
- Ho'nam-ri
- Koŭp-ri
- Kuryong-ri
- Kwangmyŏng-ri
- Kwanhŭng-ri
- Namp'ung-ri
- Namsal-li
- Pangdong-ri
- Pangp'yŏng-ri
- Pohyŏl-li
- Ponghwa-ri
- Pusang-ri
- Ryongdŏng-ri
- Ryongp'o-ri
- Ryongsam-ri
- Ryongsil-li
- Samsŏng-ri
- Sanyang-ri
- Tongjung-ri
- Tongsang-ri
- Unha-ri
- Unsang-ri
- Wŏndŏng-ri

== Economy ==
=== Agriculture and fishery ===
The chief local occupation is agriculture. Local crops include rice, soybeans, millet, oats, and potatoes. However, fisheries are also developed, particularly along the coast.

=== Mining ===
There is a small amount of mining, exploiting local deposits of gold, silver, limestone, fluorspar, and scaly graphite.

== Transport ==
The county is served by road and rail. Hongwŏn Station is on the P'yŏngra line of the Korean State Railway.

== Notable people from Hongwon County ==
- Rikidozan (Real Name: Kim Sin-rak; 김신락), Zainichi Korean professional wrestler

== See also ==
- Geography of North Korea
- Administrative divisions of North Korea
- South Hamgyong
