= Kankyōnan Province =

1910–1945 province of Korea under Japan

Kankyōnan-dō 咸鏡南道
- Former province of Korea, Empire of Japan
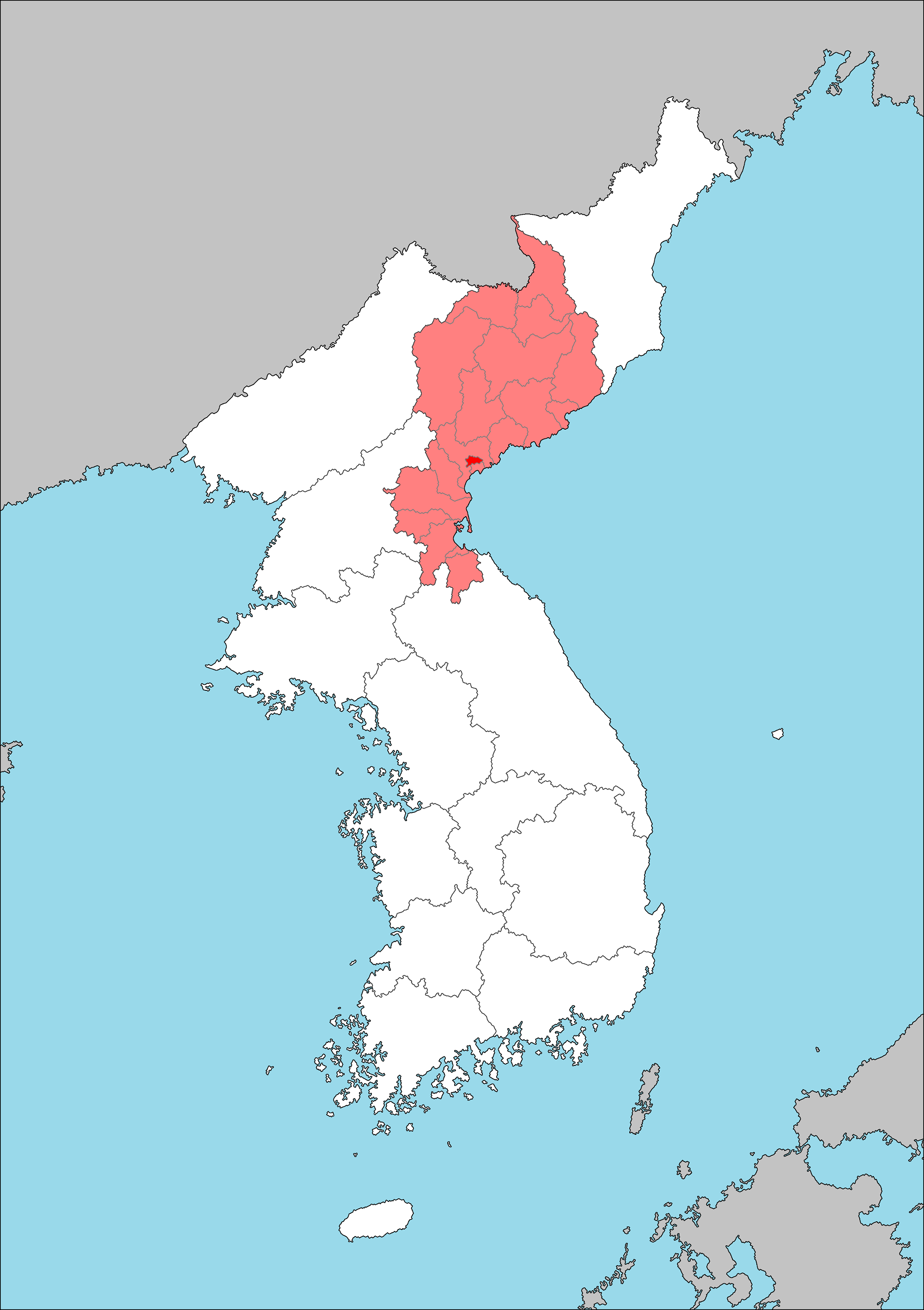
- Capital: Kankō
Preceded by	Succeeded by
South Hamgyong Province	Soviet Civil Administration
- Today part of: North Korea

Kankyōnan-dō (咸鏡南道; Korean: 함경남도), alternatively Kankyōnan Province or South Kankyō Province, was a province of Korea under Japanese rule. Its capital was Kankō (Hamhung). The province mainly consisted of modern-day South Hamgyong Province, North Korea, with additional surrounding territories. It was the site of gold mining and a leader of stock farmed cattle and pigs.

== Population ==
Number of people by nationality according to the 1936 census:

- Overall population: 1,602,178 people
  - Japanese: 51,052 people
  - Koreans: 1,544,883 people
  - Other: 6,243 people

== Administrative divisions ==
=== Cities ===
Emblem of Kankō

Emblem of Genzan

- Kankō (咸興) - (capital): Hamhung (함흥)
- Genzan (元山): Wonsan (원산)
- Kōnan (興南): Hungnam (흥남)

=== Counties ===
- Kanshū (咸州): Hamju (함주)
- Teihei (定平): Chongpyong (정평)
- Eikō (永興): Yeongheung (영흥)
- Kōgen (高原): Kowon (고원)
- Bunsen (文川): Munchon (문천)
- Anpen (安邊): Anbyon (안변)
- Kōgen (洪原): Hongwon (홍원)
- Hokusei (北靑): Pukchong (북청)
- Rigen (利原): Riwon (리원)
- Tansen (端川): Tanchon (단천)
- Shinkō (新興): Sinhung (신흥)
- Chōshin (長津): Changjin (장진)
- Hōzan (豊山): Pungsan (풍산)
- Sansui (三水): Samsu (삼수)
- Kōzan (甲山): Kapsan (갑산)
- Keizan (惠山): Hyesan (혜산)

== Provincial governors ==
Family Register	Name	Chinese Characters	Term of Office	Remarks
Korean	Sin Ŭng-hŭi	申應熙	October 1, 1910 – September 23, 1918	Governor of South Hamgyŏng Province
Korean	Yi Kyuwan	李圭完	September 23, 1918 – December 1, 1924	Governor; from August 1919, Governor of South Hamgyŏng Province
Korean	Kim Kwan-hyŏn	金寛鉉	December 1, 1924 – August 14, 1926	
Naichijin	Nakano Tasaburō	中野 太三郎	August 14, 1926 – January 21, 1929	
Naichijin	Mano Seiichi	馬野 精一	January 21, 1929 – December 11, 1929	
Naichijin	Matsui Fusajirō	松井 房治郎	December 11, 1929 – November 12, 1930	
Naichijin	Sekimizu Takeshi	関水 武	November 12, 1930 – August 4, 1933	
Naichijin	Hagiwara Hikozō	萩原 彦三	August 4, 1933 – February 4, 1935	
Naichijin	Yunomura Tatsujirō	湯村 辰二郎	February 4, 1935 – October 16, 1936	
Naichijin	Sasagawa Kyōzaburō	笹川 恭三郎	October 16, 1936 – September 2, 1940	
Naichijin	Shingai Hajime	新貝 肇	September 2, 1940 – May 31, 1941	
Naichijin	Dange Ikutarō	丹下 郁太郎	May 31, 1941 – April 7, 1942	
Naichijin	Seto Michikazu	瀬戸 道一	April 7, 1942 – December 1, 1943	
Naichijin	Yagyū Shigeo	柳生 繁雄	December 1, 1943 – February 14, 1945	
Naichijin	Kishi Yūichi	岸 勇一	February 14, 1945 – August 15, 1945	Tenure ended with Korea's independence

== See also ==
- Provinces of Korea
- Governor-General of Chōsen
- Administrative divisions of Korea
- National Geographic December 1945 map
