= Musan mine =

Coordinates: 42°13′55″N 129°16′09″E

- Interactive map of Musan mine
- Location: Musan County, North Hamgyong Province, North Korea
- Products: Iron ore
- Opened: 1935

The Musan mine(무산광산연합기업소) is a large iron mine located in north-east North Korea in North Hamgyong Province. Musan represents one of the largest iron ore reserves in North Korea and in the world having estimated reserves of 3 billion tonnes of ore grading 41% iron metal.

Industrial-level mining operations began in 1935 during the Japanese occupation of Korea and was carried out by the Mitsubishi Mining Co. From 1940-45, the mine produced a combined 3,838,454 tonnes of ore concentrate at an average iron concentration of 58% elemental iron. The Korean War brought mining operations to a halt but by 1989, national iron ore production had risen to 9.8 million tonnes, with Musan producing upwards of two-thirds of the total. The mining industry once again collapsed as a result of the fall of the Soviet Union and the 1994-99 North Korean famine. Production levels at Musan have yet to rebound to pre-famine highs.
