= Kangdok Line =

Railway line in North Korea

Kangdŏk Line

Overview
- Native name: 강덕선(康德線)
- Status: Operational
- Owner: Chosen Government Railway (1941–1945); Korean State Railway (since 1945)
- Locale: Ch'ŏngjin-si, North Hamgyŏng
- Termini: Namgangdŏk; Susŏng
- Stations: 4

Service
- Type: Heavy rail, Passenger & freight rail Regional rail

History
- Opened: 1 December 1941

Technical
- Line length: 15.2 km (9.4 mi)
- Number of tracks: Single track
- Track gauge: 1,435 mm (4 ft 8 1/2 in) standard gauge
- Electrification: 3000 V DC Overhead line
Route map
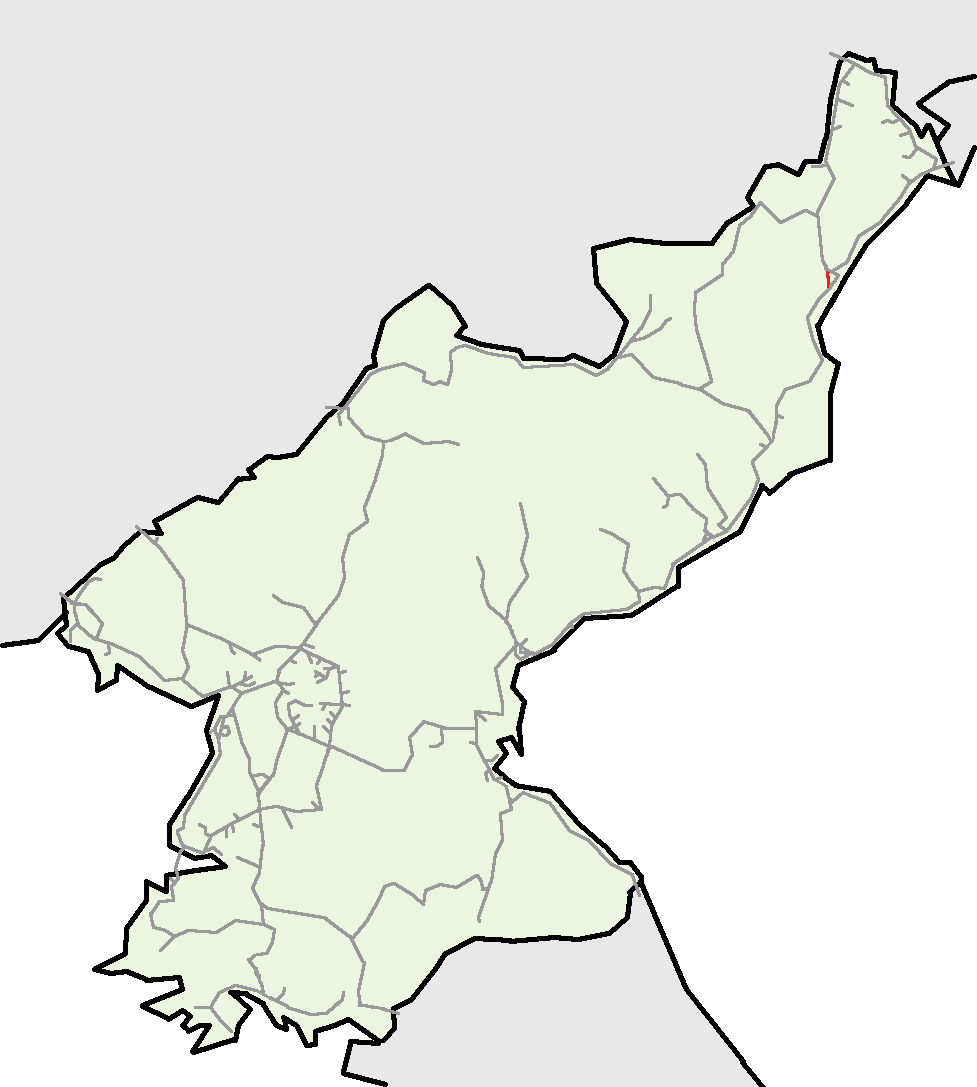

- Kangdok Line
- Hangul: 강덕선
- Hanja: 康德線
- RR: Gangdeokseon
- MR: Kangdŏksŏn

The Kangdŏk Line is an electrified standard-gauge secondary line of the North Korean State Railway running from Namgangdŏk on the P'yŏngra Line to Susŏng on the Hambuk Line.

Ch'ŏngjin Choch'ajang, Ch'ŏngjin's large marshalling yard, is located on this line.

== History ==
The first rail line to reach Susŏng was the Ch'ŏngjin−Ch'angp'yŏng section of the Hamgyŏng Line, opened by the Chosen Government Railway (Sentetsu) on 5 November 1916. On 31 July 1917, the management of Sentetsu was transferred from the Railway Bureau of the Government-General of Korea to the South Manchuria Railway (Mantetsu). Under Mantetsu management, construction of the Hamgyŏng Line was accelerated, and to handle increasing freight traffic on the line, a large marshalling yard, called Ch'ŏngjin Choch'ajang, was built near Ch'ŏngjin. To access this, a new 14.9 km (9.3 mi) line between Ranam and Susŏng was opened on 10 December 1919; Kangdŏk Station, located 7.2 km (4.5 mi) from Ranam, was opened on 1 August 1922.

On 1 December 1941, a new line was opened between Ranam and Ch'ŏngjin to allow trains to bypass the Ch'ŏngjin marshalling yard. The existing line, running via Kangdŏk and the marshalling yard, was detached from the Hamgyeong Line and designated the Kangdŏk Line; at the same time, a 2.4 km (1.5 mi) connection from Ch'ŏngjin Sŏhang Station (Ch'ŏngjin West Port, today called Songp'yŏng) to Kangdŏk was built, to allow southbound trains to access the marshalling yard without having to reverse at Ranam.

== Services ==
Two passenger trains are known to operate on this line:

- Local trains 601/604, operating between Ch'ŏngjin Ch'ŏngnyŏn and Kŭndong, run on this line between Namgangdŏk and Kŭndong;
- Local trains 608/608'609, operating between Kŭndong and Songp'yŏng, run on this line between Kŭndong and Namgangdŏk.

== Route ==
A yellow background in the "Distance" box indicates that section of the line is not electrified.

Distance (km)		Station Name		Former Name		
Total	S2S	Transcribed	Chosŏn'gŭl (Hanja)	Transcribed	Chosŏn'gŭl (Hanja)	Connections
0.0	0.0	Namgangdŏk (South Kangdŏk)	님강덕 (南康德)			P'yŏngra Line
1.3	1.3	Kangdŏk	강덕 (康德)			Kŭndong Branch
7.3	6.0	Kŭndong	근동 (芹洞)			Kŭndong Branch
15.2	7.9	Susŏng	수성 (輸城)			Hambuk Line

=== Kŭndong Branch ===
Electrified.

Distance (km)		Station Name		Former Name		
Total	S2S	Transcribed	Chosŏn'gŭl (Hanja)	Transcribed	Chosŏn'gŭl (Hanja)	Connections
0.0	0.0	Kangdŏk	강덕 (康德)			Kangdŏk Line
5.5	5.5	Ch'ŏngjin Choch'ajang (Ch'ŏngjin Marshalling Yard)	청진조차장 (淸津操車場)			
8.1	2.6	Kŭndong	근동 (芹洞)			Kangdŏk Line
