= Kimchaek station =

Railway station in North Korea

Coordinates: 40.6653°N 129.1962°E

Kimch'aek station is a railway station in North Korea. It is located on the P'yŏngra Line of the Korean State Railway.
