= Orang station =

Railway station in North Korea

Ŏrang

General information
- Location: North Korea
- Coordinates: 41.4504°N 129.6581°E
- Operator: Korean State Railway
- Line: P'yŏngra Line

Services
Preceding station	Korean State Railway	Following station
Ŏdaejin towards P'yŏngyang	P'yŏngra Line	Ryonghyŏn towards Rajin
Location

Ŏrang station is a railway station in North Korea. It is located on the P'yŏngra Line of the Korean State Railway.
