= Ragwon station (Pyongra Line) =

Railway station in North Korea

Ragwŏn

General information
- Location: North Korea
- Coordinates: 39.9061°N 127.7728°E
- Operator: Korean State Railway
- Line: P'yŏngra Line
Location

Ragwŏn station is a railway station in North Korea. It is located on the P'yŏngra Line of the Korean State Railway.
