= Riwon station =

Railway station in North Korea

Riwŏn

General information
- Location: North Korea
- Coordinates: 40.3243°N 128.6522°E
- Operator: Korean State Railway
- Line: P'yŏngra Line
Location

Riwŏn station is a railway station in North Korea on the P'yŏngra Line of the Korean State Railway.
