= Chongjinhang Line =

Korean State Railway in North Korea

Ch'ŏngjin Port Line

Overview
- Other name: Ch'ŏngjin Wharf Line
- Native name: 청진항선(淸津港線)
- Status: Operational
- Owner: Korean State Railway
- Locale: North Hamgyŏng
- Termini: Ch'ŏngjin Ch'ŏngnyŏn; Ch'ŏngjinhang
- Stations: 2

Service
- Type: Heavy rail, Freight rail
- Operator(s): Korean State Railway

History
- Opened: 1 July 1940

Technical
- Line length: 2.8 km (1.7 mi)
- Number of tracks: Single track
- Track gauge: 1,435 mm (4 ft 8 1/2 in) standard gauge
- Electrification: 3000 V DC Catenary

- Chongjinhang Line
- Hangul: 청진항선
- Hanja: 淸津港線
- RR: Cheongjinhangseon
- MR: Ch'ŏngjinhangsŏn

The Ch'ŏngjinhang Line, or Ch'ŏngjin Port Line, is an electrified freight-only railway line of the Korean State Railway in North Korea, connecting Ch'ŏngjin Ch'ŏngnyŏn Station at the southern junction of the P'yŏngra and Hambuk lines with Ch'ŏngjin Port.

== History ==
Originally called Ch'ŏngjinbudu Line or Ch'ŏngjin Wharf Line, it was originally opened on 1 July 1940 by the Chosen Government Railway, running 2.0 km (1.2 mi) from the former site of Ch'ŏngjin Station to Ch'ŏngjinbudu Station. The length of the line to the port was increased to 2.8 km (1.7 mi) on 1 February 1942, when the original station at Ch'ŏngjin was closed and a new station, today's Ch'ŏngjin Ch'ŏngnyŏn Station, was opened.

== Route ==
A yellow background in the "Distance" box indicates that section of the line is not electrified.

Distance (km)		Station Name		Former Name		
Total	S2S	Transcribed	Chosŏn'gŭl (Hanja)	Transcribed	Chosŏn'gŭl (Hanja)	Connections
0.0	0.0	Ch'ŏngjin Ch'ŏngnyŏn	청진청년 (淸津靑年)			Hambuk Line, P'yŏngra Line
2.8	2.8	Ch'ŏngjinhang (Ch'ŏngjin Port)	청진항 (淸津港)	Ch'ŏngjinbudu	청진부두 (淸津埠頭)	
