= Kyongsong station =

Railway station in North Korea

Coordinates: 41.5846°N 129.6087°E

Kyŏngsŏng station is a railway station in North Korea. It is located on the P'yŏngra Line of the Korean State Railway.
