= Myongchon station =

Railway station in North Korea

Myŏngch'ŏn 명천역 (明川驛)

General information
- Location: North Korea
- Coordinates: 41.0888°N 129.3881°E
- Operator: Korean State Railway
- Line: P'yŏngra Line
Location

Myŏngch'ŏn station is a railway station in North Korea on the P'yŏngra Line of the Korean State Railway. It is also the starting point of the Koch'am Colliery Line.
