= Kocham Tangwang Line =

Railway line in North Korea

Koch'am T'an'gwang Line

Overview
- Other name: Koch'am Colliery Line
- Native name: 고참탄광선(古站炭鑛線)
- Status: Operational
- Owner: Chosen Government Railway (1937–1945); Korean State Railway (since 1945)
- Locale: North Hamgyŏng
- Termini: Myŏngch'ŏn; Sinmyŏngch'ŏn
- Stations: 2

Service
- Type: Heavy rail, Freight rail

History
- Opened: ~1937

Technical
- Line length: 4.3 km (2.7 mi)
- Number of tracks: Single track
- Track gauge: 1,435 mm (4 ft 8 1/2 in) standard gauge
- Electrification: 3000 V DC Catenary

- Kocham Tangwang Line
- Chosŏn'gŭl: 고참탄광선
- Hancha: 古站炭鑛線
- Revised Romanization: Gochamtangwangseon
- McCune–Reischauer: Koch'amt'an'gwangsŏn

The Koch'am T'an'gwang Line, or Koch'am Colliery Line, is an electrified 4.3 km (2.7 mi) long freight-only railway line of the Korean State Railway in North Hamgyŏng Province, North Korea, from Myŏngch'ŏn on the P'yŏngra Line to Sinmyŏngch'ŏn and the Myŏngch'ŏn Coal Complex.

== History ==
The line was originally opened around 1937 by the Chosen Government Railway.

== Route ==
A yellow background in the "Distance" box indicates that section of the line is not electrified.

Distance (km)		Station Name		Former Name		
Total	S2S	Transcribed	Chosŏn'gŭl (Hanja)	Transcribed	Chosŏn'gŭl (Hanja)	Connections
0.0	0.0	Myŏngch'ŏn	명천 (明川)	Koch'am	고참 (古站)	P'yŏngra Line
4.3	4.3	Sinmyŏngch'ŏn	신명천 (新明天)			
