= Hamju station =

Railway station in North Korea

Coordinates: 39.8474°N 127.4375°E

Hamju station is a railway station in North Korea. It is located on the P'yŏngra Line of the Korean State Railway.
