= Chongpyong County =

- County
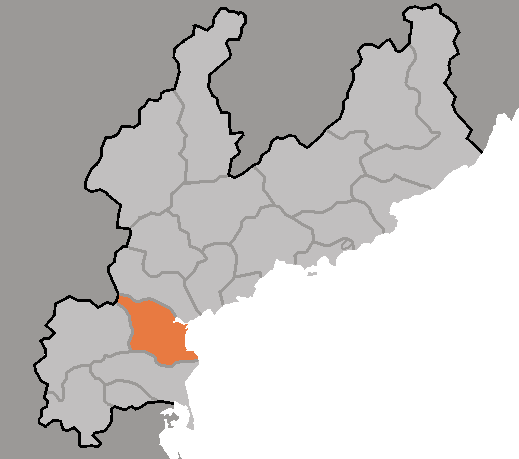
- Map of South Hamgyong showing the location of Chongpyong
- Coordinates: 39°45′00″N 127°20′00″E
- Country: North Korea
- Province: South Hamgyong Province
- Administrative divisions: 1 ŭp, 2 workers' district, 42 ri

Area
  - Total: 747 km^{2} (288 sq mi)

Population (2008)
  - Total: 179,114

Korean name
- Hangul: 정평군
- Hanja: 定平郡
- RR: Jeongpyeong-gun
- MR: Chŏngp'yŏng-gun

Chŏngp'yŏng County (Korean: 정평군) is a county in South Hamgyŏng province, North Korea. It borders South P'yŏngan province to the south, and the East Korea Bay to the east.

== History ==
The first historical recorded names for this region was Paji (파지; 巴只) and Sonwi (선위; 宣威). In 1041, it was renamed to Chongju (정주; 定州). in 1413, during the rule of King Taejong, it was renamed from Chongju to Chongpyong due to having the same name as Chongju located in Pyongan Province.

== Physical features ==
The highest point is Noranbong. Most of the county's land is mountainous, but the southeast region is flat. The chief river is the Kumjin River. In the winter, its climate is continental and the weather is bitterly cold; however, the influence of the Rangrim Mountains makes Chŏngp'yŏng's climate milder than that of the Yellow Sea coast.

== Administrative divisions ==
Chŏngp'yong county is divided into 1 ŭp (town), 2 rodongjagu (workers' districts) and 42 ri (villages):

- Chŏngp'yong-ŭp
- Sinsang-rodongjagu
- Yonghŭng-rodongjagu
- Changch'ŏl-li
- Changdong-ri
- Changhŭng-ri
- Choyang-ri
- Chungp'yŏng-ri
- Ch'angsil-li
- Ch'owŏl-li
- Hanam-ri
- Hojung-ri
- Honam-ri
- Hwadong-ri
- Hyangdong-ri
- Kuch'ang-ri
- Kuŭp-ri
- Kuyang-ri
- Kwanghŭng-ri
- Kwanp'yŏng-ri
- Munbong-ri
- Munch'ang-ri
- Munhŭng-ri
- Naedong-ri
- Namch'ang-ri
- Pokhŭng-ri
- Pongdae-ri
- Pup'yŏng-ri
- P'ungyang-ri
- Ryulsŏng-ri
- Samdo-ri
- Sasu-ri
- Sinch'ŏl-li
- Sinp'ung-ri
- Sinp'yŏng-ri
- Sinsŏng-ri
- Sŏgyŏng-ri
- Sŏndŏng-ri
- Taho-ri
- Toksal-li
- Tongch'ŏl-li
- Tongha-ri
- Tongho-ri
- T'aeyang-ri

== Economy ==
=== Agriculture and fishery ===
Rice is cultivated on the level ground of the southeast, where the soil is fertile. Small amounts of other farming and orcharding also take place. Due to the county's coastal location, fishing is also practised.

=== Mining ===
Mining is a minor component of the local economy.

== Transport ==
Chŏngp'yŏng county is served by the P'yŏngra Line of the Korean State Railway.

== See also ==
- Geography of North Korea
- Administrative divisions of North Korea
