= Hongwon station =

Railway station in North Korea

Coordinates: 40.0230°N 127.9603°E

Hongwŏn station is a railway station in North Korea. It is located on the P'yŏngra Line of the Korean State Railway.
