= Sincham station =

Railway station in North Korea

Sinch'am 신참

Korean name
- Hangul: 신참역
- Hanja: 新站驛
- Revised Romanization: Sincham-yeok
- McCune–Reischauer: Sinch'am-yŏk

General information
- Location: Musan, North Hamgyŏng; North Korea
- Coordinates: 42.1119°N 129.4092°E
- Owner: Korean State Railway

History
- Opened: 20 August 1927

Services
Preceding station	Korean State Railway	Following station
West P'ungsan towards Musan	Musan Line	Kŭmp'ae towards Komusan
Location

Sinch'am station is a railway station in Musan county, North Hamgyŏng province, North Korea, on the Musan Line of the Korean State Railway.

It was opened, along with the rest of the Komusan-Sinch'am section of the Musan line, on 20 August 1927.

Local passenger trains running between Musan and Ch'ŏngjin on the southern junction of the Hambuk and P'yŏngra lines serve this station, and there are several daily commuter trains for workers and students between Musan and Komusan.
