= Hamgyong Mountains =

Mountain range in North Korea

Coordinates: 41.9145°N 128.5430°E

The Hamgyong Mountains (Korean: 함경산맥; Hanja: 咸鏡山脈; RR: Hamgyeong Sanmaek), officially known as the Gangbaekjeonggan and formerly known as the Pepi Shan or Tumen Mountains, is a North Korean mountain range. It lies in the northeast quarter of the country, extending for about 350 kilometers (220 mi) southwest and northeast parallel to the Sea of Japan (East Sea of Korea). Its northern terminus is in the Tumen Valley. To its west are the Kaema Highlands.

The southwestern end of the range, west of its turn northwards to meet the Tumen, is also known as the Pujollyong or Pujonryong Mountains (부전령산맥; 赴戰岭山脈; Bujeollyeong Sanmaek).

Overall, the Hamgyongs are the highest range of mountains on the peninsula. The tallest mountain in the range is Kwanmo Peak (2,540 m), the second-highest after Paektu (China's "Changbai"). Other notable peaks include Du Peak (2,396 m), Gwesang Peak (2,333 m) and Mount Dury (2,303 m). In total, ten major peaks and 62 subsidiary peaks of the mountains in this range are 2,000 m or higher.

== See also ==
- North and South Hamgyong Provinces, which the range is named after.
