= Puryong County =

Puryong County 부령군
- County

Korean transcription(s)
  - Hanja: 富寧郡
  - McCune-Reischauer: Puryŏng kun
  - Revised Romanization: Buryeong-gun
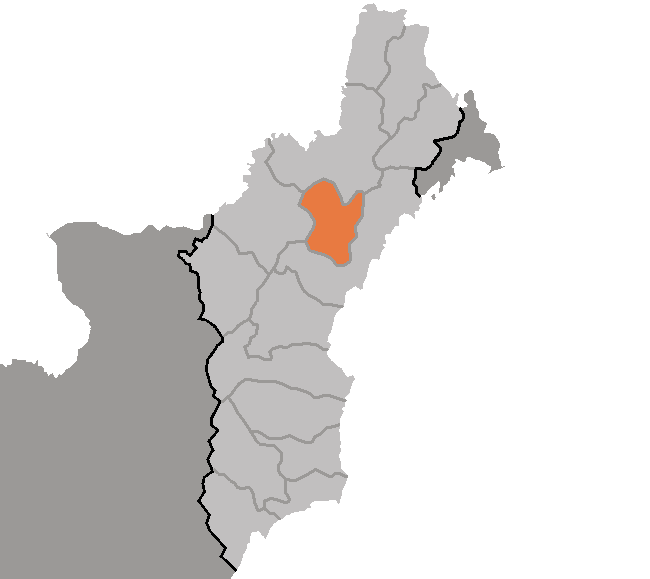
- Map of North Hamgyong showing the location of Puryong
- Country: North Korea
- Province: North Hamgyong Province
- Administrative divisions: 1 ŭp;, 3 workers' districts, 5 ri

Area
  - Total: 1,900 km^{2} (730 sq mi)

Population (2008 census)
  - Total: 48,958
  - Density: 26/km^{2} (67/sq mi)

Puryŏng County is a kun, or county, in North Hamgyŏng province, North Korea.

== Geography ==
Most of the county is mountainous, being traversed by the Hamgyŏng Range and its outlying spurs. The highest point is Kosŏngsan (Chosŏn'gŭl: 고성산, Hancha: 姑城山), 1,754 meters above sea level. Many other high peaks are also found in the county. The chief stream is the Susŏngch'ŏn (Chosŏn'gŭl: 수성천. Hancha: 輸城川).

90% of the county is forested. Rare mammals inhabit the area, including the marten, brown bear, and Amur leopard. The climate is affected by both maritime and continental influences.

== Administrative divisions ==
Puryŏng County is divided into 1 ŭp (town), 3 rodongjagu (workers' districts) and 5 ri (villages):

- Puryŏng-ŭp
- Komusal-lodongjagu
- Musu-rodongjagu
- Sŏngmang-rodongjagu
- Choehyŏl-li
- Ch'angp'yŏng-ri
- Hyŏngje-ri
- Kŭmgang-ri
- Saha-ri

== Economy ==
The local economy is dominated by metalworking, mining, and electric power. Deposits of gold, copper, quartzite, and limestone are found in the county. The intermontane valleys are home to grain farms where corn, soybeans, rice, wheat, barley, proso millet, and millet are harvested. Rice fields make up 2% of the county's area. Sericulture is also practiced.

== Transportation ==
Puryŏng lies on the Hambuk and Musan lines of the Korean State Railway, and is also served by roads.

== History ==
Puryŏng was one of the six post/garrisons (Korean: 육진; Hancha: 六鎭) established under the order of Sejong the Great of Chosŏn (1418–1450) to safeguard his people from the hostile Chinese and Manchurian nomads living in Manchuria.

== Notables personalities ==
- Ri Chi-si (Korean: 리지시; Hancha: 李之詩), the prefect of Puryŏng (Korean: 부령 부사; Hancha: 富寧府使)

== See also ==
- Geography of North Korea
- Administrative divisions of North Korea
