= Musan Line =

Railway line in North Korea

Overview
- Other name: Hambuk Line
- Native name: 무산선 (茂山線)
- Status: Operational
- Owner: North Chosen Colonial Railway (1927–1944); Chosen Government Railway (1944–1945); Korean State Railway (since 1945)
- Locale: Musan-gun, Puryŏng-gun, North Hamgyŏng
- Termini: Komusan; Musan
- Stations: 13

Service
- Type: Heavy rail, Regional rail
- Depot(s): Ch'ŏlsong

History
- Opened: Stages between 1927-1929; 1 May 1940 (regauged)

Technical
- Line length: 57.9 km (36.0 mi)
- Number of tracks: Double track (Komusan - Sinch'am); Single track
- Track gauge: 1,435 mm (4 ft 8 1/2 in) standard gauge
- Old gauge: 762 mm (2 ft 6 in)
- Electrification: 3000 V DC Catenary
Route map
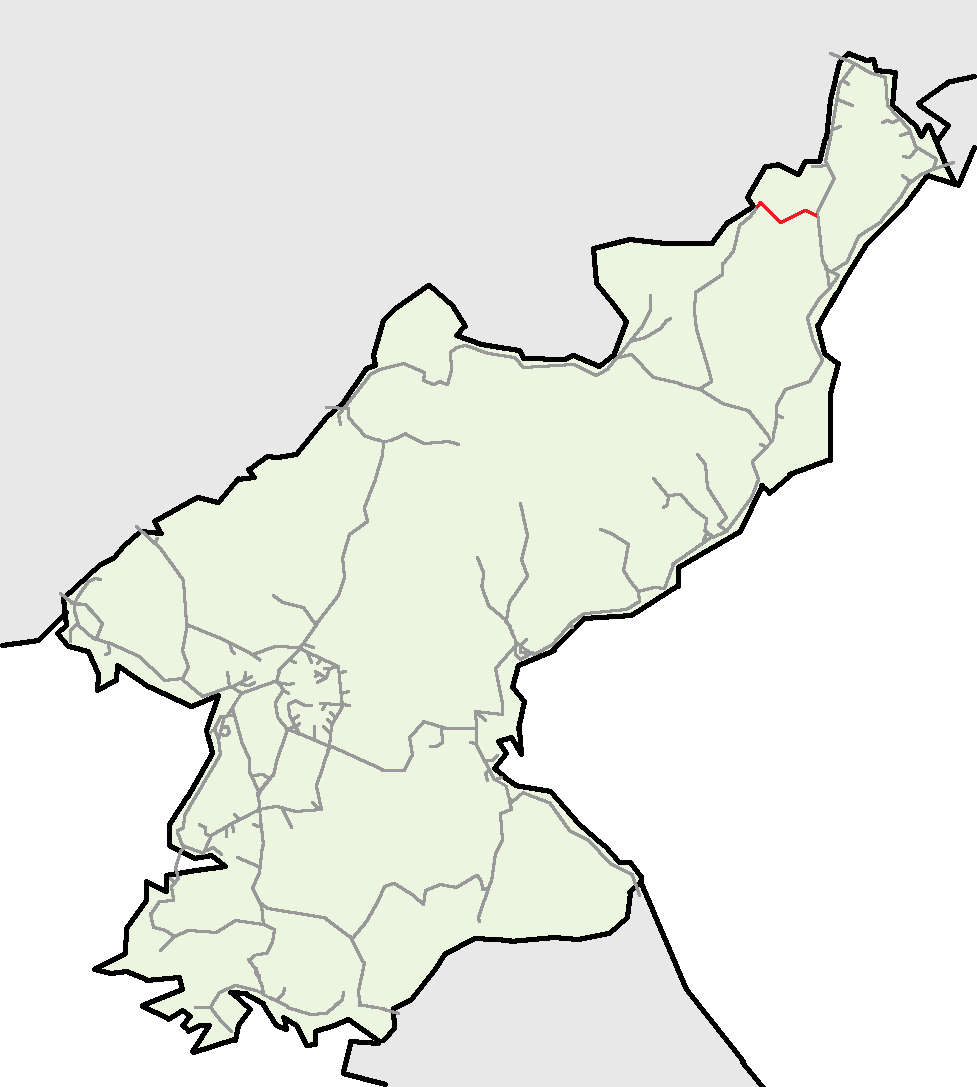

- Musan Line
- Hangul: 무산선
- Hanja: 茂山線
- RR: Musanseon
- MR: Musansŏn

The Musan Line is an electrified standard-gauge secondary trunk line of the Korean State Railway in Musan and Puryŏng counties, North Hamgyŏng Province, North Korea, running from Komusan on the Hambuk Line to Musan, where it connects to the narrow-gauge Paengmu Line. The section from Komusan to Sinch'am is double tracked.

The line starts at Komusan on the Hambuk Line, following the Susŏngch'ŏn stream through the Hamgyŏng Mountains of Puryŏng and Musan Counties to Musan. The line is 57.9 km in length, with 13 stations.

There is a sorting yard at Musan Station and locomotive facilities at Ch'ŏlsong.

== History ==
In order to exploit the rich iron deposits of the Musan region, the North Chosen Colonial Railway began construction of this line, calling it the Hambuk Line (not to be confused with the current Hambuk Line, which at that time was part of the Hamgyŏng Line). The line was opened in two parts - the Komusan-Sinch'am section opening on 20 August 1927, and the Sinch'am-Musan segment being opened on 15 November 1929. On 1 February 1937, Musan Ch'ŏlsan station was opened.

Originally built as a narrow-gauge line, the conversion to standard gauge was completed on 1 May 1940, and the extension to Musan Kangan station was completed then as well. By 1942, the North Chosen Colonial Railway was operating four daily return trips between Komusan and Musan, timed to connect with local and express services on the Chosen Government Railway's (Sentetsu) Hamgyŏng Line. On 1 April 1944, the line was absorbed into Sentetsu; at the same time, the line was given its current name, Musan Line, and the extension to Musan Kangan station was closed.

In order to facilitate the transport of ironstone from the Musan Mining Complex, the 33.6 km section between Sinch'am and Komusan was double-tracked, and electrification of the line was completed in 1977.

== Services ==
=== Freight ===
Freight traffic on the Musan Line is 7.5 times greater in the eastbound (Musan-Komusan) direction than the reverse. 94.2% of the freight moved towards Komusan is magnetite ore from the Musan Mining Complex; timber accounts for 4.3%. From Komusan to Musan coal forms the majority of freight, along with other necessities - grain, fertiliser, cement etc. A large portion of westbound trains consist of empty cars bound for the mines at Musan.

Most freight traffic on the line is from the Musan Mining Complex via the Musan Mining Line to the Kim Chaek Steel Complex, the Ch'ŏngjin Steel Works, the Sŏngjin Steel Complex and export goods to Namyang Station for forwarding to China.

=== Passenger ===
There are two passenger trains known to operate on this line:

- Express trains 9/10, operating between P'yŏngyang and Musan, run along the entirety of this line between Komusan and Musan;
- Two daily pairs of local trains, 662/663 and 668/669, operate between Musan and Chuch'o.

There are also local trains running between Musan and Ch'ŏngjin at the southern junction of the Hambuk and P'yŏngra Lines. Further, there are several daily commuter trains for workers between Musan and Ch'ŏlsong and for students between Musan and Komusan.

== Route ==
A yellow background in the "Distance" box indicates that the section of the line is not electrified.

=== Mainline ===
Distance (km)		Station Name		Former Name		
Total	S2S	Transcribed	Chosŏn'gŭl (Hanja)	Transcribed	Chosŏn'gŭl (Hanja)	Connections
0.0	0.0	Komusan	고무산 (古茂山)			Hambuk Line
4.2	4.2	Sŏsang	서상 (西上)			
8.9	4.7	Musu	무수 (舞袖)			
14.5	5.6	P'yemusan	폐무산 (廢茂山)			
18.9	4.4	Ch'aryŏng	차령 (車嶺)			
22.6	3.7	Kŭmp'ae	금패 (金佩)			
33.6	11.0	Sinch'am	신참 (新站)			
39.4	5.8	Sŏp'ungsan	서풍산 (西豊山)			
45.7	6.3	Chuch'o	주초 (朱草)			
50.5	4.8	Ch'ŏlsong Ch'ŏngnyŏn	철송청년 (鐵松靑年)	Chinhwa	진화 (珍貨)	Musan Mining Line
54.3	3.8	Musan Ch'ŏlsan	무산철산 (茂山鐵山)			
57.9	3.6	Musan	무산 (茂山)			Paengmu Line
~~60.4~~	~~2.5~~	Musan Kang'an	무산강안 (茂山江岸)			Closed 1944.
