= Musan station =

Railway station in Musan County, North Korea

Musan 무산
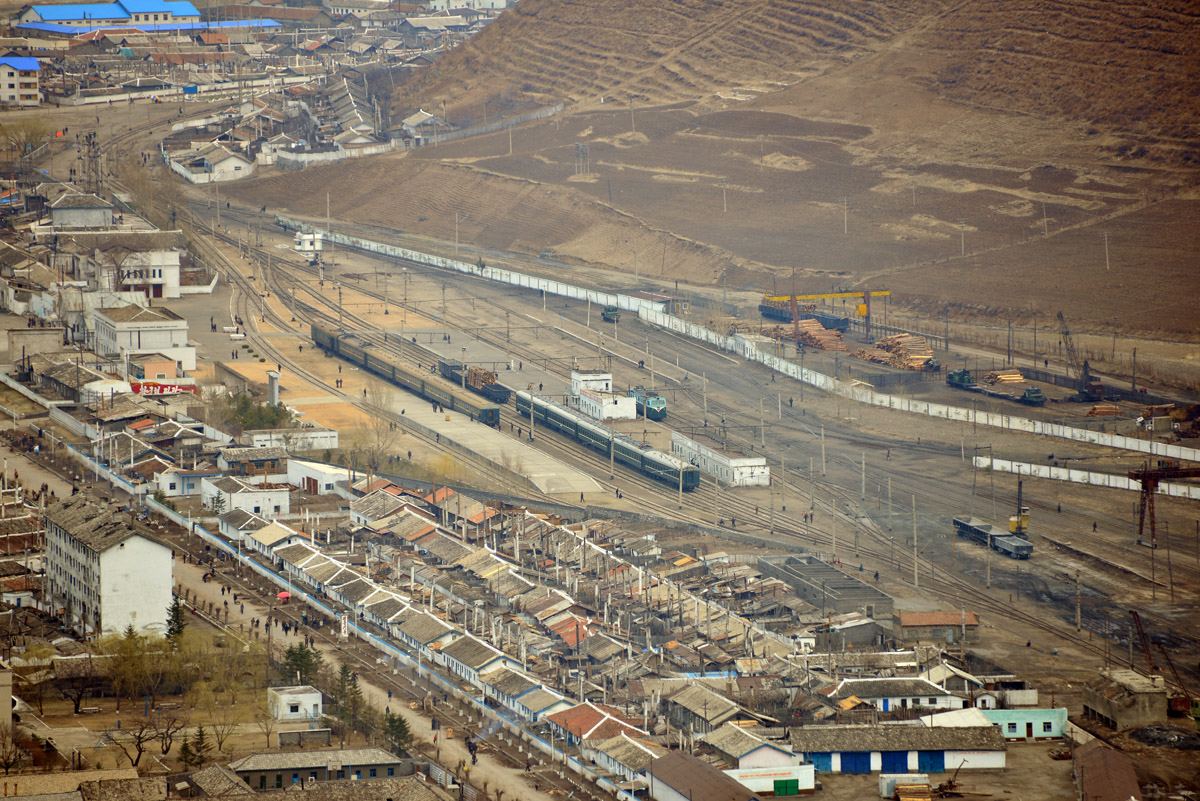

Korean name
- Hangul: 무산역
- Hanja: 茂山驛
- Revised Romanization: Musan-yeok
- McCune–Reischauer: Musan-yŏk

General information
- Location: Musan-ŭp, Musan, North Hamgyŏng; North Korea
- Coordinates: 42.2237°N 129.2150°E
- Owner: Korean State Railway

History
- Opened: 15 November 1929

Services
Preceding station	Korean State Railway	Following station
Terminus	Musan Line	Musan Ch'ŏlsan towards Komusan
Terminus	Paengmu Line	Namch'on towards Paegam Ch'ŏngnyŏn
Location

Musan station is a railway station in Musan-ŭp, Musan county, North Hamgyŏng province, North Korea, at the terminus of the Musan Line of the Korean State Railway. The narrow-gauge Paengmu Line from Paegam on the Paektusan Ch'ŏngnyŏn Line also terminates here.

There is a marshalling yard located here.

== History ==
It was opened, along with the rest of the Sinch'am–Musan section of the Musan line, on 15 November 1929. On 1 May 1940, an extension to Musan Kangan station was opened, but this was subsequently closed on 1 April 1944.

== Services ==
=== Freight ===
Magnetite ore from the Musan Mining Complex destined for the Kim Chaek Steel Complex, the Ch'ŏngjin Steel Works and the Sŏngjin Steel Complex, along with timber transshipped from the Paengmu Line, forms the majority of outbound freight traffic from Musan station.

=== Passenger ===
There are two passenger trains known to operate on this line:

- Express trains 9/10, operating between P'yŏngyang and Musan, runs along the entirety of this line between Komusan and Musan;
- Two daily pairs of local trains, 662/663 and 668/669, operate between here and Chuch'o.

There are also local trains running between here and Ch'ŏngjin at the southern junction of the Hambuk and P'yŏngra lines. Further, there are several daily commuter trains for workers between Musan and Ch'ŏlsong and for students between Musan and Komusan.
