= Komusan station =

Railway station in Puryong County, North Korea

Komusan 고무산

Korean name
- Hangul: 고무산역
- Hanja: 古茂山驛
- Revised Romanization: Gomusan-yeok
- McCune–Reischauer: Komusan-yŏk

General information
- Location: Komusal-lodongjagu, Puryŏng, North Hamgyŏng; North Korea
- Coordinates: 42.1169°N 129.6963°E
- Owner: Korean State Railway
- Lines: Hambuk Line; Musan Line

History
- Opened: 1917

Services
Preceding station	Korean State Railway	Following station
Puryŏng towards Rajin	Hambuk Line	Sŏkpong towards Ch'ŏngjin Ch'ŏngnyŏn
Sŏsang towards Musan	Musan Line	Terminus
Location

Komusan station is a railway station in Komusal-lodongjagu, Puryŏng, North Hamgyŏng province, North Korea. It is the junction point of the Hambuk and Musan lines of the Korean State Railway.

The station was opened in 1917 by the Chosen Government Railway, at the same time as the rest of the Ch'ŏngjin-Hoeryŏng section of the former Hamgyŏng Line; from 1934 to 1940 it was managed by the South Manchuria Railway. The station was destroyed during the Second World War; after the Korean War, it was refurbished with Soviet and Chinese assistance.
