= Musan County =

Musan County 무산군
- County

Korean transcription(s)
  - Hanja: 茂山郡
  - McCune-Reischauer: Musan kun
  - Revised Romanization: Musan-gun
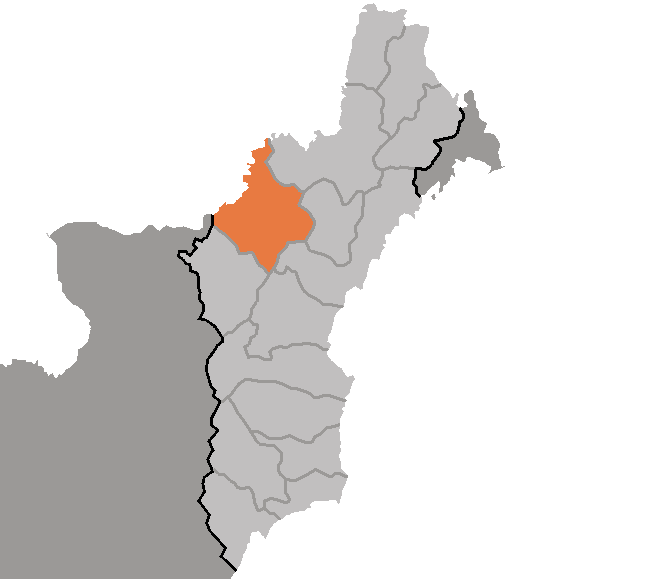
- Map of North Hamgyong showing the location of Musan
- Coordinates: 42°04′14″N 129°20′20″E
- Country: North Korea
- Province: North Hamgyong Province

Population (2008)
  - Total: 123,721

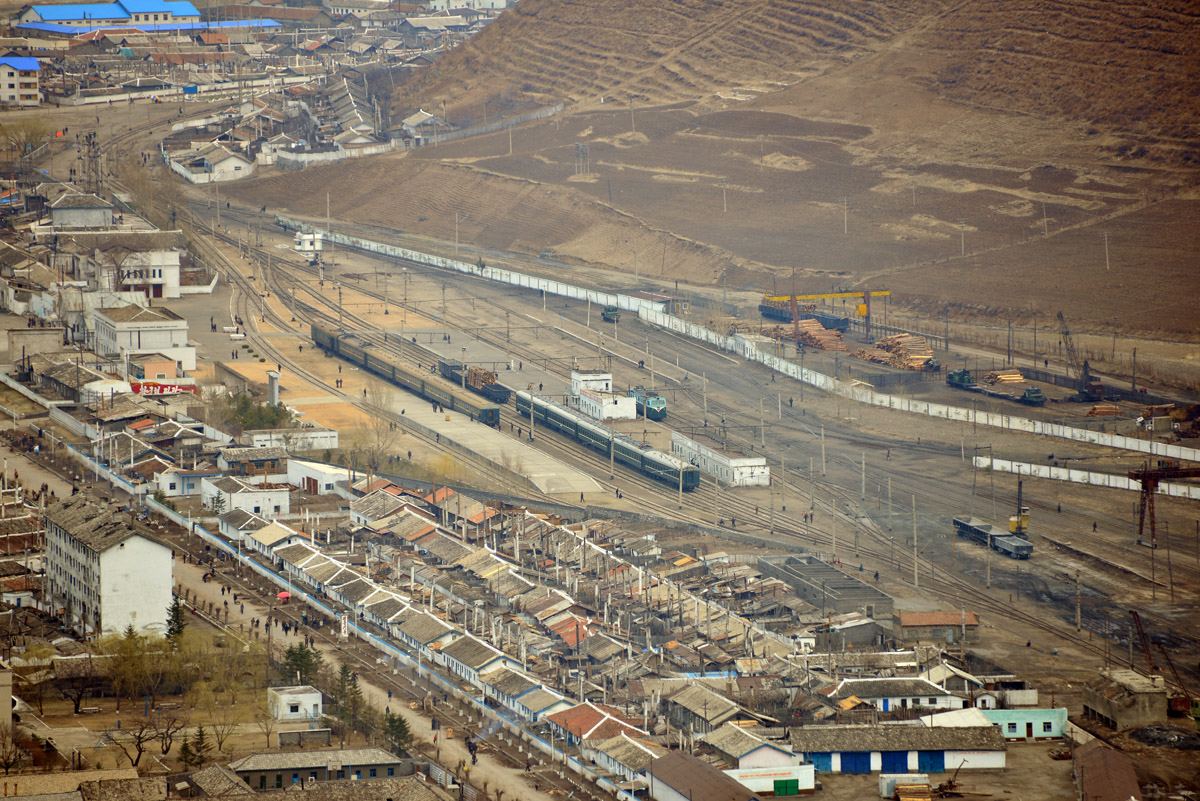
Musan station

Musan County is a county in central North Hamgyong province, North Korea. It borders the People's Republic of China to the north, across the Tumen River. It is divided into one ŭp, six labor districts, and fifteen ri. The county seat is the town of Musan, Musan ŭp. Luguo and Dehua are the closest Chinese cities across the river.

The land of Musan is high and more than 90% is mountainous and uninhabited; much of it lies on the Paekmu Plateau, while the northwest makes up part of the Musan Plateau. The Hamgyong Mountains pass along the county's northwest flank. Musan is the coldest region in North Hamgyong.

The Musan area has long been known for iron ore mines, lumber, and potatoes. The Musan mine, a major excavator of iron ore, is located here. Because many of the trees have been cut down for fuel, there are few trees left.

Individual farmers in Musan raise cows, chicken, ducks, and rabbits. However, the government prohibits the people from using the cows for beef consumption. The cows are used for work only.

Several railroads cross the county, including the Musan Line and Paengmu Line.

Musan and the surrounding region was greatly affected by flooding in 2016 as the result of Typhoon Lionrock.

== Administrative divisions ==
Musan County is divided into 1 ŭp (town), 6 rodongjagu (workers' districts) and 15 ri (villages):

- Musan-ŭp
- Chuch'o-rodongjagu
- Ch'angryŏl-lodongjagu
- Kangsŏl-lodongjagu
- Mayang-rodongjagu
- Namsal-lodongjagu
- Sambong-rodongjagu
- Chich'o-ri
- Ch'ayu-ri
- Ch'ilsŏng-ri
- Hŭng'am-ri
- Minbong-ri
- Obong-ri
- Okch'ŏl-li
- Pakch'ŏl-li
- P'ungsal-li
- Rimgang-ri
- Saegŏl-li
- Sangch'ang-ri
- Sŏho-ri
- Tokso-ri
- Un'am-ri
