= Hambuk Line =

Railway line in North Korea

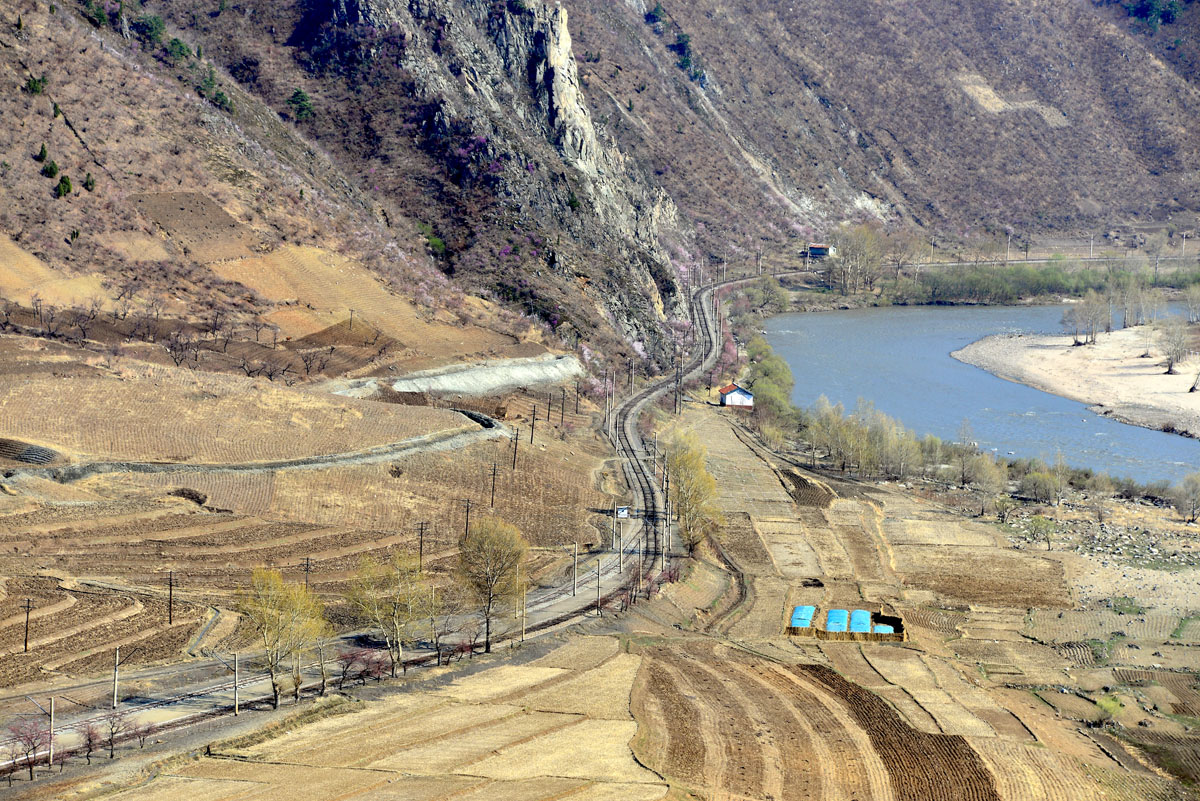
- View of the Hambuk Line near Kanp'yŏng

Overview
- Status: Operational
- Owner: Ch'ŏngjin–Hoeryŏng: Sentetsu (1916–1933); Hoeryŏng–Tonggwan: Domun Railway (1920–1929); Hoeryŏng–Tonggwan: Sentetsu (1929–1933); Tonggwan–Unggi: Sentetsu (1929–1933); Ch'ŏngjin–Unggi: Mantetsu (1933–1940); Ch'ŏngjin–Sangsambong: Sentetsu (1940–1945); Sangsambong–Unggi: Mantetsu (1940–1945); Unggi–Rajin: Mantetsu (1935–1945); Ch'ŏngjin–Rajin: Korean State Railway (since 1945)
- Locale: North Hamgyŏng; Rasŏn
- Termini: Ch'ŏngjin Ch'ŏngnyŏn; Rajin
- Stations: 51

Service
- Type: Heavy rail, Regional rail
- Depot(s): Hoeryŏng, Sambong

History
- Opened: Stages between 1916–1935

Technical
- Line length: 325.1 km (202.0 mi)
- Number of tracks: Double track (Susŏng - Komusan); Single track
- Track gauge: 1,435 mm (4 ft 8 1/2 in) standard gauge partly with 1,520 mm (4 ft 11 27/32 in) (Dual Gauge, Hongŭi-Rajin)
- Electrification: 3000 V DC Overhead lines
Route map
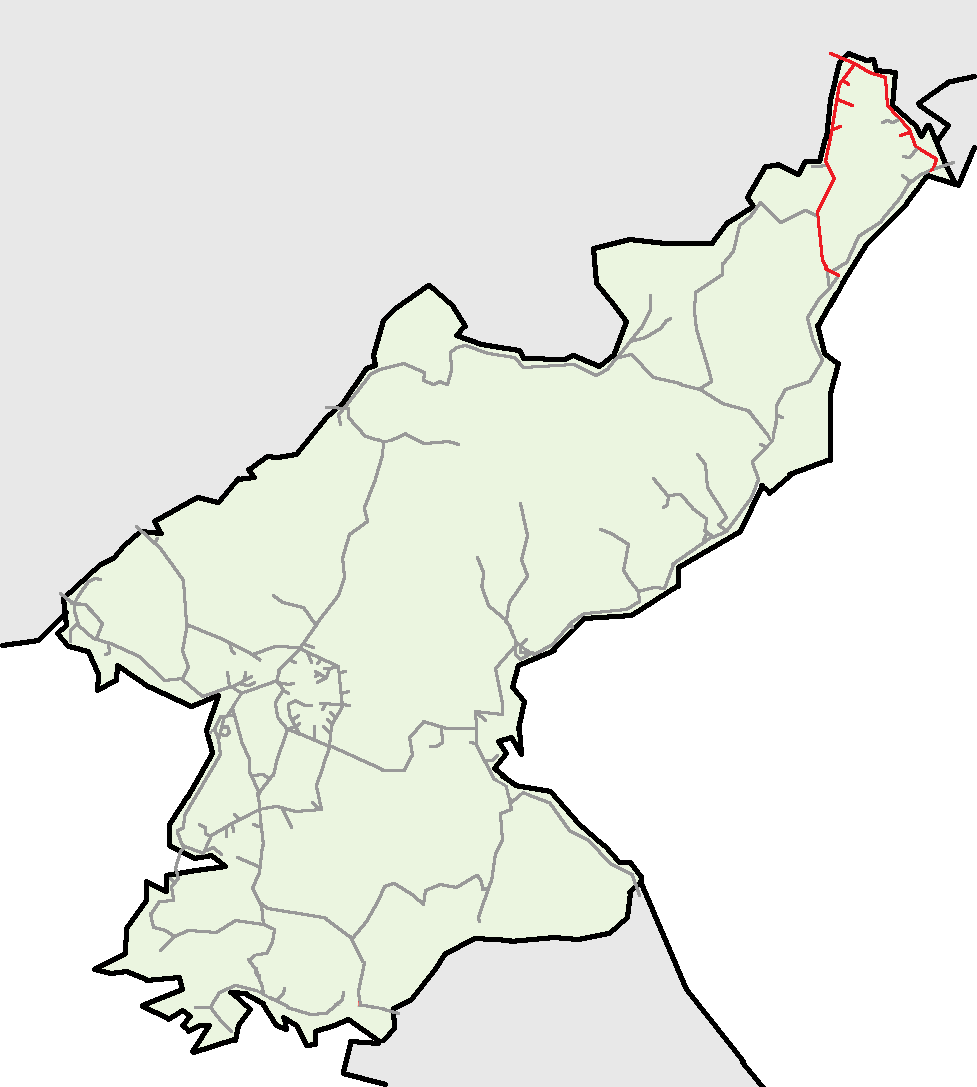
Some stations omitted for clarity

- Hambuk Line
- Hangul: 함북선
- Hanja: 咸北線
- RR: Hambukseon
- MR: Hambuksŏn

The Hambuk Line is an electrified standard-gauge trunk line of the Korean State Railway in North Korea, running from Ch'ŏngjin on the P'yŏngra Line to Rajin, likewise on the P'yŏngra line.

The Hambuk line connects to the Hongŭi Line at Hongŭi, which is North Korea's only rail connection to Russia, and at Namyang to the Namyang Border Line, which leads to Tumen, China, via the bridge over the Tumen River.

Although located entirely inside North Hamgyŏng Province, this line is one of the DPRK's main trunk railways. The line's total length is 325.1 km (202.0 mi); in terms of length, it is the second-longest rail line in the country after the P'yŏngra Line, accounting for 7.7% of the national total of railway lines.

Over ten rail lines - secondary mainlines and branchlines - connect to the Hambuk Line, including the Musan Line, the Hoeryŏng Colliery Line, the Kogŏnwŏn Line, the Hoeam Line, and the Hongŭi Line, along with numerous branchlines. The Hambuk Line connects three cities and four counties - Ch'ŏngjin City, Puryŏng County, Hoeryŏng City, Onsŏng County, Kyŏngwŏn County, Kyŏnghŭng County, and the Rason Special City.

In terms of regional characteristics, the Hambuk Line passes through two largely distinct areas. It runs inland in mountainous terrain between Panjuk to Hoeryŏng, then along the Tumen River and the northern border of the country all the way to Rajin. The steepest part of the line is between Puryŏng and Ch'angp'yŏng, where the ruling gradient is over 20‰. Conversely, the route on the Tumen River's bank along the national border is comparatively flat.

There is double track from Susŏng, where the line connects to the Kangdŏk line, to Komusan, where the Musan line begins; the dual-gauge section (standard and Russian gauges) from Hongŭi to Rajin is also double-tracked.

There are service facilities for locomotives in Hoeryŏng and Sambong and for rolling stock in Namyang.

== History ==
The Hambuk Line was created by the combination of a number of lines that were originally built by several different railway companies.

The Ch'ŏngjin–Hoeryŏng section was originally part of the Hamgyŏng Line of the Chosen Government Railway (Sentetsu), completed in three stages between November 1916 and November 1917.

The section from Hoeryŏng to Tonggwan (now called Kangalli) line was built by the privately owned Tomun Railway between 1920 and 1924, and in 1929 was nationalised by Sentetsu, which named it the West Tomun Line. The East Tomun Line, from Tonggwan to Unggi (now Sŏnbong), was built by Sentetsu between 1929 and 1933; after completion of the East Tomun Line, it was merged with the West Tomun Line to create the Tomun Line.

In October 1933, management of the entire line from Ch'ŏngjin to Unggi was transferred to the South Manchuria Railway (Mantetsu); at that time, the Ch'ŏngjin–Sambong section was added to the existing (Wŏnsan–Ch'ŏngjin) Hamgyŏng Line, whilst the Sambong–Unggi section became Mantetsu's North Chosen Line. Mantetsu connected this line to the port at Rajin by opening the Ungna Line from Unggi to Rajin on 1 November 1935.

In 1940, the Ch'ŏngjin–Sambong line was transferred back to the Chosen Government Railway, and was made part of the Hamgyŏng Line running from Wŏnsan to Sambong. An express train from Seoul to Mudanjiang via this line was inaugurated at this time. Until the end of the Pacific War, the Ch'ŏngjin–Sambong section remained part of Sentetsu's Hamgyŏng Line, the Sangsambong–Unggi section and the adjoining branch lines remained part of Mantetsu's North Chosen Line, and the Ungna Line remained part of Mantetsu's network, as well.

Service on the line was suspended after the Soviet invasion at the end of the Pacific War. The damage sustained by the line during the war - including the destruction of the Tumen River bridges at both Hunyung and Sambong - was slow to be repaired due to strained relations between the Soviets and the Korean People's Committees; those two bridges have not been repaired to the present day. However, after the outbreak of the Korean War, the Soviets built a branchline from Baranovsky on the Vladivostok branch of the Soviet Far Eastern Railway to Khasan. The station at Khasan was opened on 28 September 1951, and in 1952 a wooden railway bridge was built across the Tumen River to Tumangang in North Korea, connecting to the newly built Hongŭi Line from Tumangang to Hongŭi on the North Chosen Line.

Following the end of the Korean War, the Ch'ŏngjin–Sambong section of the Hamgyŏng Line, the Sambong–Unggi (renamed Sŏnbong) section of the North Chosen Line, and the Ungna Line from Sambŏng to Rajin were merged to create the Hambuk Line; this line, having been damaged during the war, was rebuilt with Soviet and Chinese assistance. The Korean-Russian Friendship Bridge across the Tumen River was commissioned on 9 August 1959, replacing the temporary wooden bridge, which had grown to be insufficient for the traffic crossing the river, and in 1965 the P'yŏngra Line was completed to Rajin, meeting up with the terminus of the Hambuk Line.

In 2008 work was begun to convert the line from the DPRK–Russia border to the port at Rajin to dual (standard and Russian) gauge, including the entirety of the Hongŭi Line and the Hongŭi-Rajin section of the Hambuk Line.

Construction of a branch from Nongp'o to a new industrial facility was begun in 2018.

== Services ==
=== Freight ===
Much of the on-line freight traffic involves the transport of magnetite and ironstone from the Musan Mining Complex and other mines on the Musan Line and coal from mines on the Hoeryŏng Colliery Line and the Kogŏnwŏn Line, to the Kim Chaek Iron & Steel Complex at Kimchaek and the Ch'ŏngjin Steel Works in Ch'ŏngjin, and import-export traffic to and from Russia via the Hongŭi Line and to and from China via Namyanggukkyŏng Line; the primary exports shipped through Namyang to China are magnetite, talc and steel, and the main import is coke.

=== Passenger ===
Three pairs of passenger express trains are known to operate on this line:

- Express trains 7/8, operating between P'yŏngyang and Moscow via Tumangang, run on this line between Rajin and Hongŭi;
- Express trains 9/10, operating between P'yŏngyang and Musan, run on this line between Chŏngjin and Komusan;
- Semi-express trains 113/114, operating between West P'yŏngyang and Onsŏng, run on this line between Ch'ŏngjin and Unsŏng;

There are also long-distance trains between Kalma on the Pyongra Line and Rajin via Ch'ŏngjin and Hoeryŏng; between Ch'ŏngjin and Rajin via Hoeryŏng; between Haeju on the Hwanghae Ch'ŏngnyŏn Line and Onsŏng via Ch'ŏngjin and Hoeryŏng; and between Tanch'ŏn on the P'yŏngra Line and Tumangang via Ch'ŏngjin and Hoeryŏng.

There are also various commuter trains that serve the main industrial zones along the line, including trains 623/624 operating between Rajin and Sŏnbong; between Kogŏnwŏn on the Kogŏnwŏn Line and Hunyung via Singŏn; between Hoeryŏng and Ch'ŏn'gŏ-ri; between Ch'angp'yŏng and Sŏkpong; between Namyang and Hunyung; and between Hoeryŏng and Sech'ŏn via Sinhakp'o.

== Route ==
A yellow background in the "Distance" box indicates that section of the line is not electrified.

Distance (km)		Station Name		Former Name		
Total	S2S	Transcribed	Chosŏn'gŭl (Hanja)	Transcribed	Chosŏn'gŭl (Hanja)	Connections
-3.1	531.0	Ch'ŏngjin Ch'ŏngnyŏn	청진청년 (淸津靑年)	Ch'ŏngjin	청진 (淸津)	P'yŏngra Line, Ch'ŏngjin Port Line
0.0	3.1	Ch'ŏng'am	청암 (靑岩)			
4.7	4.7	Susŏng	수성 (輸城)			Kangdŏk Line
10.3	5.6	Sŏngmak	석막 (石幕)			
18.1	7.8	Changhŭng	장흥 (章興)			
24.1	6.0	Hyŏngje	형제 (兄弟)			
32.6	8.5	Puryŏng	부령 (富寧)			
38.9	6.3	Komusan	고무산 (古茂山)			Musan Line
44.7	5.8	Sŏkpong	석봉 (石峰)			
51.4	6.7	Ch'angp'yŏng	창평 (蒼坪)			
58.7	7.3	Chŏn'gŏri	전거리 (全巨里)			
64.8	6.1	P'ungsan	풍산 (豊山)			
69.4	4.6	Ch'angdu	창두 (昌斗)			
76.4	7.0	Chungdo	중도 (中島)			
82.4	6.0	Taedŏk	대덕 (大德)			
89.5	7.1	Hoeryŏng Ch'ŏngnyŏn	회령 청년 (會寧靑年)	Hoeryŏng	회령 (會寧)	Hoeryŏng Colliery Line
~~90.4~~	~~0.9~~	Sinhoeryŏng	신회령 (新會寧)			Closed
93.2	3.7	Kŭmsaeng	금생 (金生)			
98.9	5.7	Koryŏngjin	고령진 (高嶺鎭)			
104.3	5.4	Sinhakp'o	신학포 (新鶴浦)			Sech'ŏn Line
107.2	2.9	Hakp'o	학포 (鶴浦)			
116.6	9.4	Sinjŏn	신전 (新田)			
123.0	6.4	Kanp'yŏng	간평 (間坪)			
129.9	6.9	Sambong	삼봉 (三峰)	Sangsambong	상삼봉 (上三峰)	
~~133.1~~	~~3.2~~	Hasambong	하삼봉 (下三峰)			Closed 1933
139.0	9.1	Chongsŏng	종성 (鍾城)			Tongp'o Line
~~144.2~~	~~5.2~~	Soam	소암 (嘯巖)			Closed 1944
147.2	8.2	Kangalli	강안리 (江岸里)	Tonggwan	동관 (潼關)	Sŏngp'yŏng Line
153.1	5.9	Sugup'o	수구포 (水口浦)			
159.8	6.7	Kangyang	강양 (江陽)			
165.9	6.1	Namyang	남양 (南陽)			Namyang Border Line
169.8	3.9	P'ungri	풍리 (豊利)			
~~175.9~~	~~6.1~~	Sesŏn	세선 (世仙)			Closed
180.4	4.5	Unsŏng	운성 (穩城)			
185.9	5.5	P'ung'in	풍인 (豊仁)			
195.5	9.6	Hwangp'a	황파 (黄坡)			
205.1	9.6	Hunyung	룬융 (訓戎)			
210.5	5.4	Hamyŏn	하면 (下面)			
214.8	4.3	Saebyŏl	새졀 (-)	Kyŏngwŏn	경원 (慶源)	
222.1	7.3	Nongp'o	농포 (農圃)			
225.9	3.8	Ryongdangri	룡당리 (龍洞里)	Sŭngryang	(承良)	
234.3	8.4	Sin'gŏn	신건 (新乾)			Kogŏnwŏn Line
244.9	10.6	Sinasan	신아산 (新阿山)			
252.2	7.3	Songhak	송학 (松鶴)			Ch'undu Line
258.1	5.9	Haksong	학송 (鶴松)	Aoji	아오지 (阿吾地)	Hoeam Line
266.8	8.7	Ch'ŏnghak	청학 (靑鶴)			
276.5	9.7	Sahoe	사회 (四會)			
282.5	6.0	Hongŭi	홍의 (洪儀)			Hongŭi Line
283.5	1.0	Mulgol	물골 (-)			
289.6	6.1	Kuryongp'yŏng	구룡평 (九龍坪)			
297.6	8.0	Ungsang	웅상 (雄尚)			
308.1	10.5	Tongsŏnbong	동선봉 (東先鋒)	Tong'unggi	동웅기 (東雄基)	
309.9	12.3	Sŏnbong	선봉 (先鋒)	Unggi	웅기 (雄基)	Sŭngri Line
316.1	6.2	Kwan'gok	관곡 (寛谷)			
325.1	9.0	Rajin	라진 (羅津)			P'yŏngra Line, Rajin Port Line
