= Chongjin Chongnyon station =

Railway station in North Korea

Coordinates: 41°47′35″N 129°47′55″E

Ch'ŏngjin Ch'ŏngnyŏn 청진청년

Korean name
- Hangul: 청진청년역
- Hanja: 淸津靑年驛
- Revised Romanization: Cheongjin Cheongnyeon-nyeok
- McCune–Reischauer: Ch'ŏngjin Ch'ŏngnyŏn-nyŏk

General information
- Location: Ch'ŏng'am-guyŏk, Chŏngjin-si, North Hamgyŏng; North Korea
- Owner: Korean State Railway

History
- Opened: 5 November 1916
- Rebuilt: 1 February 1942
- Original company: Chosen Government Railway

Services
Preceding station	Korean State Railway	Following station
Ch'ŏngam towards Rajin	Hambuk Line	Terminus
Sunam towards P'yŏngyang	P'yŏngra Line	Ch'ŏngam towards Rajin
Terminus	Ch'ŏngjin Port Line	Ch'ŏngjinhang Terminus
Location

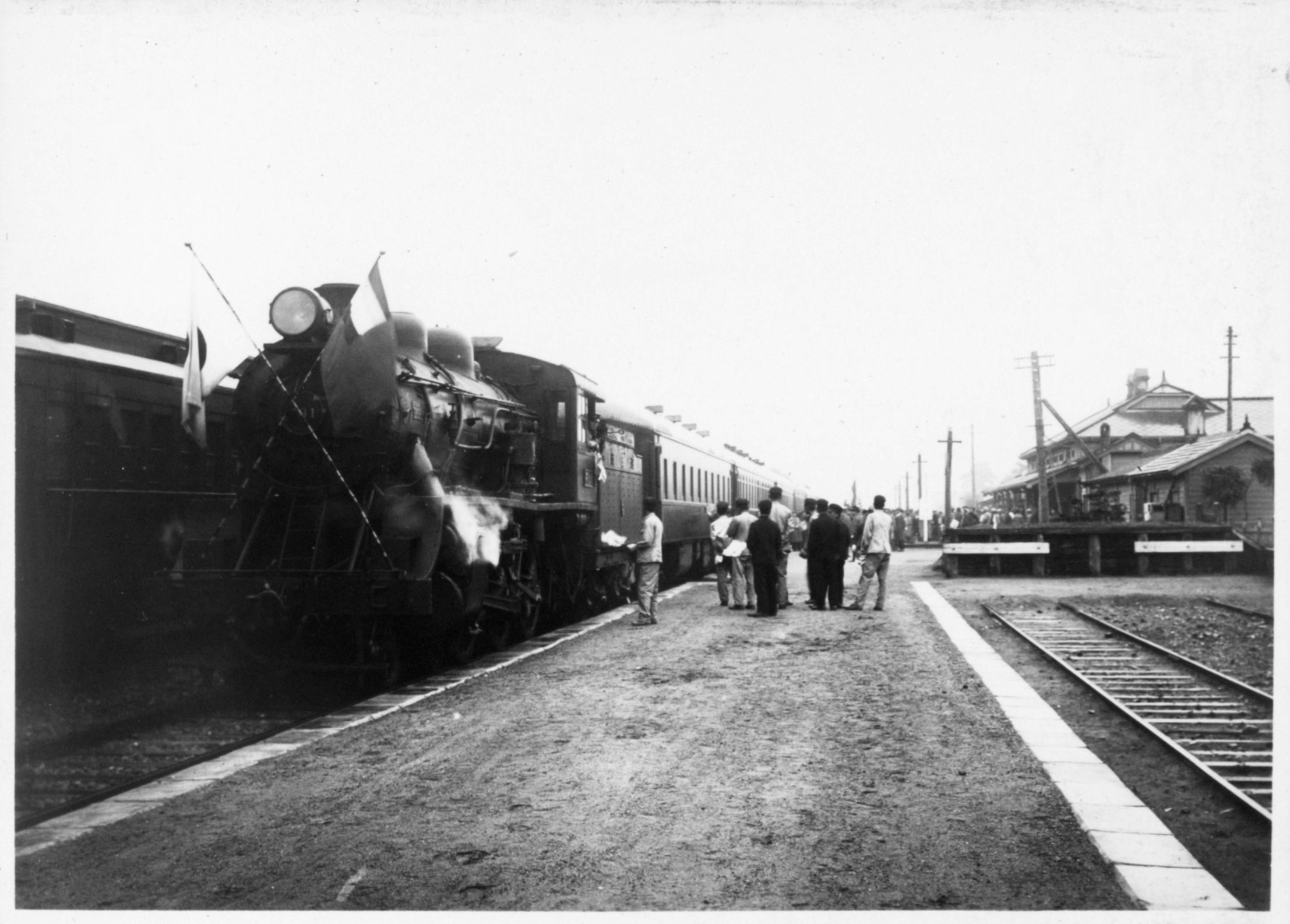

Ch'ŏngjin Ch'ŏngnyŏn station (Korean: 청진청년역) is the central railway station in Ch'ŏngjin-si, North Hamgyŏng Province, North Korea. It is the junction point of the Hambuk Line and the P'yŏngra Line of the Korean State Railway, and is the beginning of the Ch'ŏngjinhang Line to Ch'ŏngjin Port.

== History ==
Originally called Ch'ŏngjin station, it was opened by the Chosen Government Railway on 5 November 1916 together with the rest of the Ch'ŏngjin–Ch'angp'yŏng section of the former Hamgyŏng Line. On 1 February 1942, the original station at Ch'ŏngjin was closed after a new station – today's Ch'ŏngjin Ch'ŏngnyŏn station – was opened. It received its current name when the station was rebuilt after the Korean War.

== Services ==
=== Freight ===
Adjacent to the station's yard is the Ch'ŏngjin Railway Equipment Factory, which manufactures freight cars and other railway equipment. The Ch'ŏngjin Steel Works is also served by rail.

=== Passenger ===
According to the 2002 passenger timetable, two express and four semi-express trains made scheduled stops at this station in each direction:

- Express trains 7/8, operating between P'yŏngyang and Moscow via Tumangang, via the P'yŏngra Line;
- Express trains 9/10, operating between P'yŏngyang and Musan, via the P'yŏngra Line towards P'yŏngyang and via the Hambuk and Musan Lines towards Musan;
- Semi-express trains 113/114, operating between West P'yŏngyang and Unsŏng, via the Hambuk Line;
- Semi-express trains 119-122/120-121, operating between Sinch'ŏn and Ch'ŏngjin Ch'ŏngnyŏn, via the P'yŏngra Line and the Ŭnnyul Line - this train takes three days to travel each way;
- Semi-express trains 124-125/126-127, operating between Sinŭiju Ch'ŏngnyŏn and Ch'ŏngjin Ch'ŏngnyŏn, via the P'yŏngra Line and the P'yŏngŭi Line;
- Semi-express trains 128-129-130/131-132-133, operating between Kalma and Rajin, via the Kangwŏn Line and the P'yŏngra Line.

In the 1980s, there were several other long-distance passenger trains that stopped at Ch'ŏngjin Ch'ŏngnyon station:

- Kalma (Kangwŏn Line) - Ch'ŏngjin - Hoeryŏng (Hambuk Line) - Rajin;
- Ch'ŏngjin - Hoeryŏng - Rajin;
- Haeju (Hwanghae Ch'ŏngnyŏn Line) - Ch'ŏngjin - Unsŏng (Hambuk Line);
- Tanch'ŏn Ch'ŏngnyŏn (P'yŏngra Line) - Ch'ŏngjin - Tumangang (Hongŭi Line).

There are also commuter trains:

- Trains 601/604, operating between Ch'ŏngjin Ch'ŏngnyŏn and Kŭndong on the Kangdŏk Line via Namgangdŏk;
- Trains 602/615 operate between Ch'ŏngjin Ch'ŏngnyŏn and Ranam.
