= Pyeongwon Line =

1941–1945 railway line in Korea

The Pyeongwon Line was a railway line in Korea, opened in 1941 during the period of Japanese rule. The line connected Pyongyang to Gowon. It exists now North Korea and forms part of the following present day lines:

- Seopo to Tongbungri, Ryongsŏng Line
- Tongbungri to Gowon, Pyeongra Line

== History ==
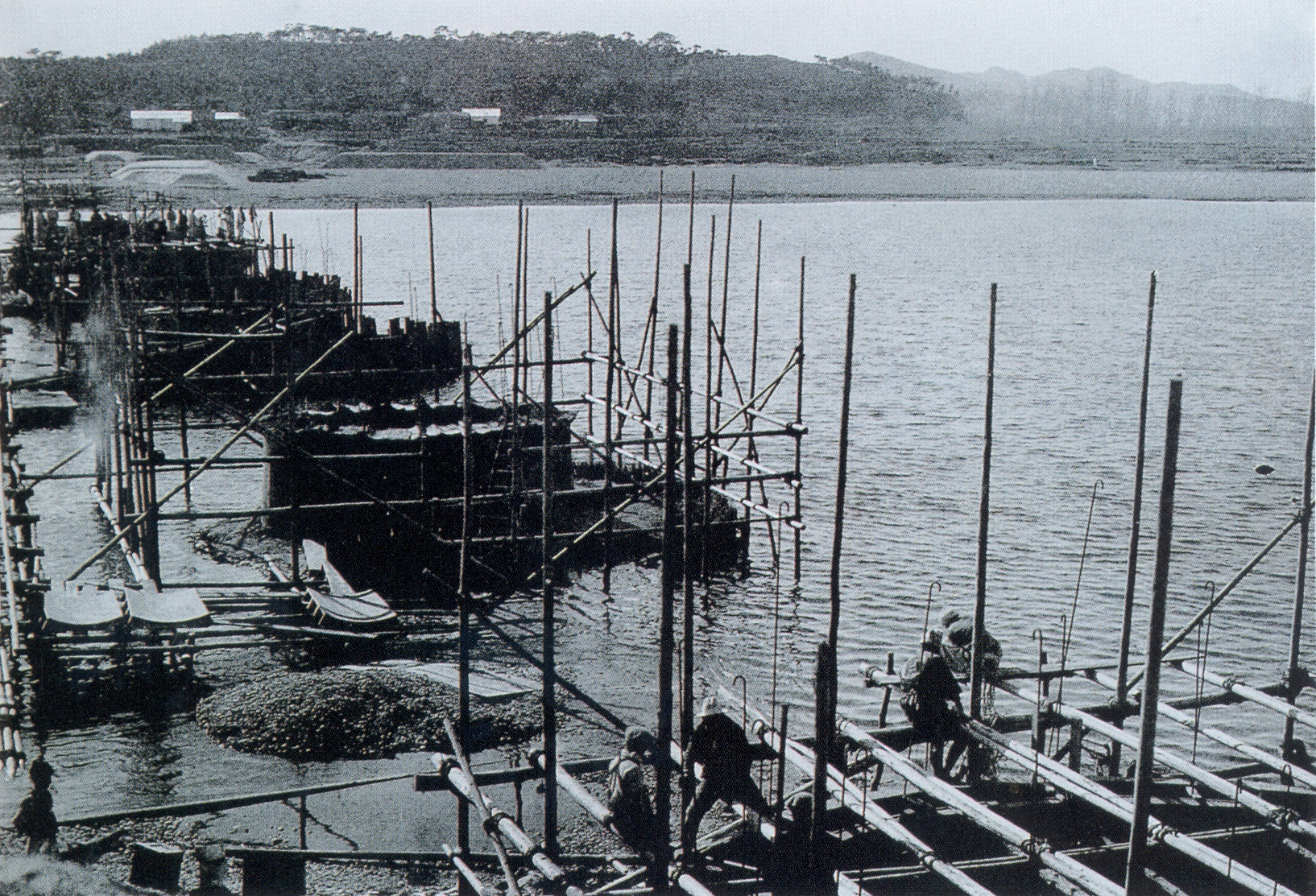
Construction of a bridge on the Pyeongwon Line

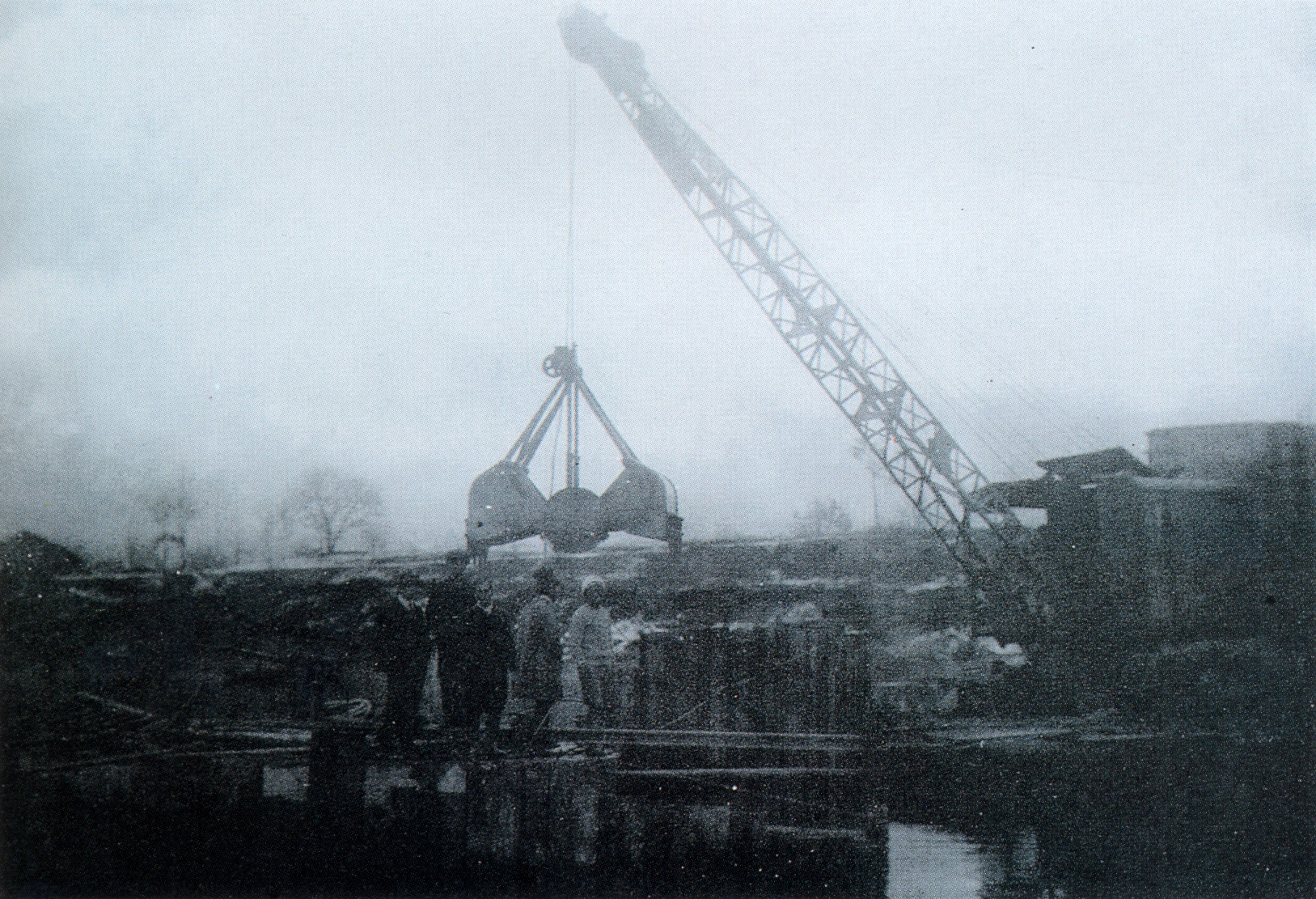
View of construction works on the Pyeongwon Line

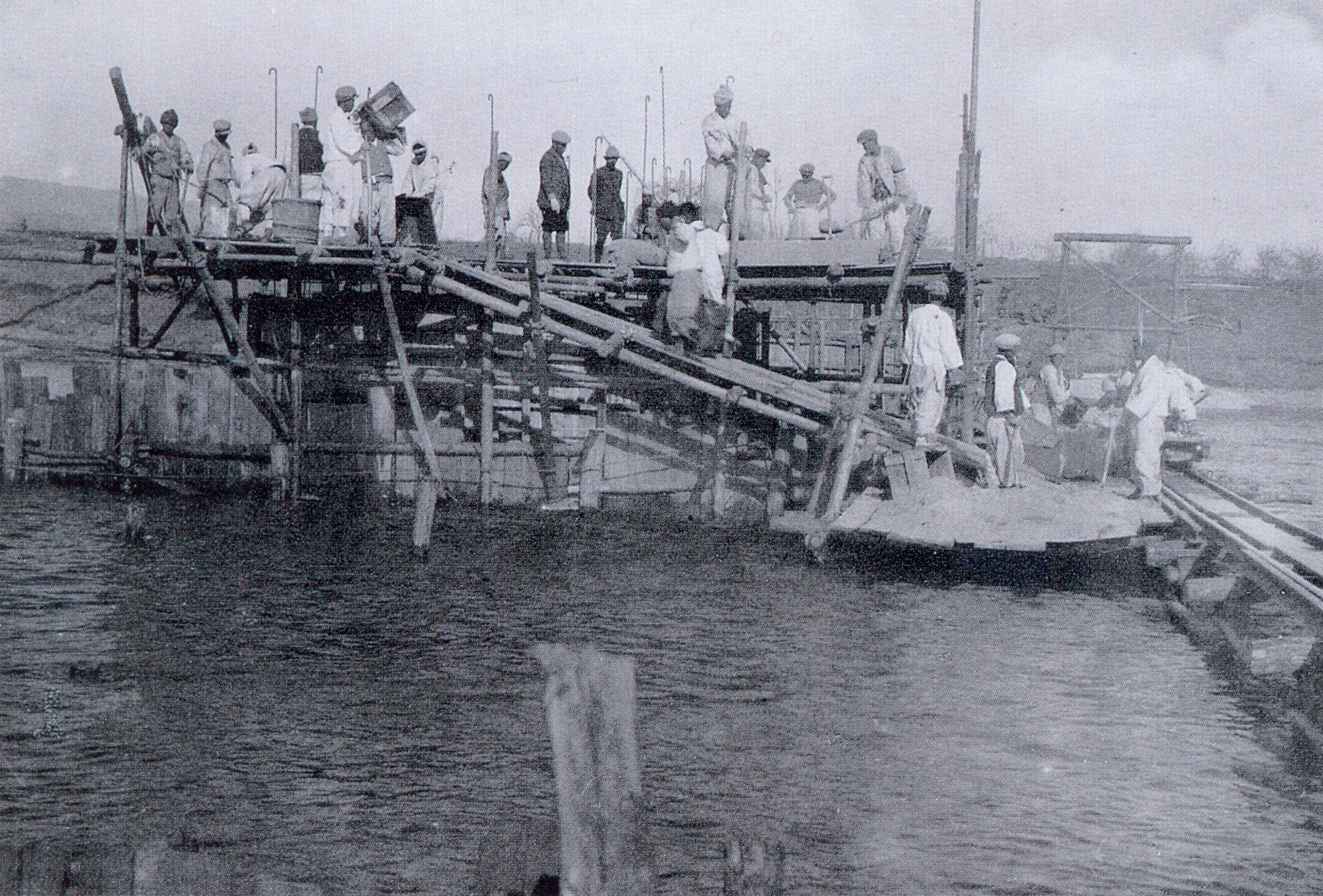
View of construction works on the Pyeongwon Line

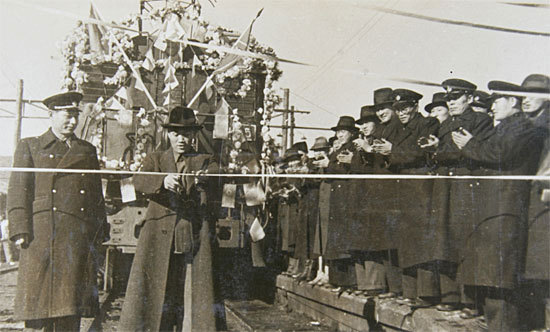
Ceremony commemorating the completion of the electrification of the Yangdŏk–Sinch'ang section of the P'yŏngwŏn Line in 1948.

The railway line was constructed by the Chosen Government Railway. The first interval between Seopo and Sainjang was opened on 1 November 1927, and the construction of the entire line was completed on 1 April 1941. When first opened, the western section of the line was called West Pyeongwon Line, and was extended as follows:

Date	Route	Length
1 November 1927	Seopo–Sainjang	25.0 km
15 October 1928	Sainjang–Suncheon	22.3 km
1 October 1929	Suncheon–Sinchang	19.7 km
1 October 1931	Sinchang–Jangnim	29.5 km
1 November 1936	Jangnim–Yangdeok	27.4 km

The eastern section was originally called East Pyongwon Line, and was extended as follows:

Date	Route	Length
16 December 1937	Gowon–Seongnae	30.0 km
1 April 1941	Seongnae–Yangdeok	58.7 km

When the eastern and western sections were joined, the 212.6 km (132.1 mi) line was renamed Pyeongwon Line.

After the establishment of the DPRK, the Pyeongwon Line became part of the Pyeongra Line.

== Route ==
Stations as of 1945
Distance		Station name					
Total; km	S2S; km	Transcribed, Korean	Transcribed, Japanese	Hunminjeongeum	Hanja/Kanji	Opening date Original owner	Connections
0.0	0.0	Seopo	Saiho	서포	西浦	1 November 1927	Sentetsu Gyeongui Line
6.0	6.0	Yongseong	Ryūjō	용성	龍城	1 November 1927	
13.1	7.1	Maram	Baran	마람	馬嵐	1 November 1927	
15.3	2.2	Tongbungni	Tōhokuri	동북리	東北里	1 November 1927	
20.5	5.2	Baesanjeom	Haisanten	배산점	裵山店	1 November 1927	
25.0	4.5	Sainjang	Shaninjō	사인장	舍人場	1 November 1927	
31.3	6.3	Bonghak	Hōkaku	봉학	鳳鶴	15 October 1928	
39.0	7.7	Jasan	Jisan	자산	慈山	15 October 1928	
47.3	6.3	Suncheon	Junsen	순천	順川	15 October 1928	Sentetsu Manpo Line (opened 1 November 1932)
50.8	3.5	Bongha	Hōka	봉하	鳳下	1 October 1929	
56.8	6.0	Eunsan	Insan	은산	殷山	1 October 1929	
61.4	4.6	Suyang	Shuyō	수양	首陽	1 October 1929	
67.0	5.6	Sinchang	Shinsō	신창	新倉	1 October 1929	Sentetsu Cheonseong Colliery Line (opened 1936)
75.5	8.5	Sudeok	Shudoku	수덕	修德	1 October 1931	
83.7	8.2	Sinseongcheon	Shinseisen	신성천	新成川	1 October 1931	West Chosen Central Railway Seoseon Line (opened 29 June 1939)
91.8	4.1	Geoheung	Kyokō	거흥	巨興	1 October 1931	
96.5	4.7	Jangnim	Chōrin	장림	長林	1 October 1931	
104.5	8.0	Dongwon	Tōgen	동원	東元	1 November 1936	
109.9	5.4	Inpyeong	Jinhei	인평	仁平	1 November 1936	
115.9	6.0	Jisu	Chisui	지수	智水	1 November 1936	
123.9	8.0	Yangdeok	Yōdoku	양덕	陽德	1 November 1936	
131.7	7.8	Naedong	Naidō	내동	內洞	1 April 1941	
137.3	5.6	Seoktang Oncheon	Sekitō Onsen	석탕온천	石湯溫泉	1 April 1941	
145.8	8.5	Geocha	Kyoshi	거차	巨次	1 April 1941	
151.8	6.0	Cheon'eul	Ten'otsu	천을	天乙	1 April 1941	
158.1	6.3	Ungok	Ungoku	운곡	雲谷	1 April 1941	
163.3	5.2	Gwanpyeong	Kanhei	관평	館坪	1 April 1941	
174.6	11.3	Cheonseong	Senjō	천성	泉城	1 April 1941	
182.6	8.0	Seongnae	Jōnai	성내	城內	16 December 1937	
188.2	5.6	Inheung	Jinkō	인흥	仁興	16 December 1937	
192.9	4.7	Chukjeon	Chuden	축전	丑田	16 December 1937	
198.0	5.1	Midun	Biton	미둔	彌屯	16 December 1937	
205.9	7.9	Buraesan	Furaisan	부래산	浮來山	16 December 1937	
212.6	6.7	Gowon	Kōgen	고원	高原	21 July 1916	Sentetsu Hamgyeong Line
