= Sillyonpo station =

Railway station in North Korea

Sillyŏnp'o 신련포

Korean name
- Hangul: 신련포역
- Hanja: 新蓮浦驛
- Revised Romanization: Sinnyeonpo-yeok
- McCune–Reischauer: Sillyŏnp'o-yŏk

General information
- Location: Sil-li, Sunch'ŏn-si, South P'yŏngan; North Korea
- Coordinates: 39.4403°N 125.9672°E
- Owner: Korean State Railway
- Lines: P'yŏngra Line; Taegŏn Line

History
- Opened: 1 October 1929
- Former names: Pongha

Services
Preceding station	Korean State Railway	Following station
Sunch'ŏn towards P'yŏngyang	P'yŏngra Line	Ŭnsan towards Rajin
Terminus	Taegŏn Line	Taegŏn towards Pongch'ang
Location

Sillyŏnp'o station is a railway station in Sil-li, Sunch'ŏn city, South P'yŏngan province, North Korea, on the P'yŏngra Line of the Korean State Railway. It is also the starting point of the Taegŏn Line to Oedong via Taegŏn, where it connects to the Ŭnsan Line.

It was originally opened by the Chosen Government Railway on 1 October 1929 as Pongha station, as part of the second extension of the P'yŏngwŏn Line. It received its current name after the establishment of the DPRK.
