= Tunjon station =

Railway station in North Korea

Tunjŏn 둔전

Korean name
- Hangul: 둔전역
- Hanja: 屯田驛
- Revised Romanization: Dunjeon-nyeok
- McCune–Reischauer: Tunjŏn-nyŏk

General information
- Location: Sudong-gu, South Hamgyŏng; North Korea
- Coordinates: 39.4427°N 126.9931°E
- Owner: Korean State Railway
- Lines: Kowŏn Colliery Line, P'yŏngra Line

Services
Preceding station	Korean State Railway	Following station
Terminus	Kowŏn Colliery Line	Sudong towards Changdong
Sŏngnae towards P'yŏngyang	P'yŏngra Line	P'alhŭng towards Rajin
Location

Tunjŏn station is a railway station in Sudong District, South Hamgyŏng Province, North Korea. It is located on the P'yŏngra Line of the Korean State Railway, and is the starting point of the Kowŏn Colliery Line.
