= Pyongyang Trolleybus Factory =

Bus manufacturer in North Korea

Coordinates: 39.007412°N 125.719325°E

Pyongyang Trolley Bus Factory
- Formerly: Pyongyang Truck Repair Factory (평양화물자동차수리공장)
- Industry: Trolleybus manufacturer
- Headquarters: Taedonggang-guyok, Pyongyang
- Key people: Kim To-kyun (engineer); Rim Myung-sun (honorary designer); Ri Song-il (chief of Sci-tech learning); Jang Chol-myung (deputy chief-engineer)
- Owner: Pyongyang City General Passenger Transport Enterprise
- Number of employees: 5000

Korean name
- Hangul: 평양무궤도전차공장
- RR: Pyeongyang mugwedo jeoncha gongjang
- MR: P'yŏngyang mugwedo chŏnch'a kongjang

The Pyongyang Trolleybus Factory (PTBF) is an automotive industry company in North Korea and is the largest trolleybus manufacturer in the DPRK. During its existence, it has also manufactured vans, refrigerated trucks and buses although its main product are the Chollima branded trolleybuses. It has continuously manufactured trolleybuses since 1960, when it built the first trolleybus in the DPRK, a Jinghua BK561 clone.

== History ==
The factory began as a truck repair factory in April 1959. It would engage in truck repairing until 1969. The first trolleybus produced at the factory was built in 1960 and was a direct copy of the Chinese Jinghua BK561 trolleybus. The first serially produced vehicle, the Chollima-9.11, was first built in 1961 although still bearing a strong resemblance to the Jinghua BK561. As passenger transport with trolleybuses only formally commenced in late 1961, trolleybuses were tested on a small loop of wire at the trolleybus factory.

The visit of Kim Il Sung in fall 1961 is commemorated in a large mosaic located in the factory courtyard, which depicts when he visited the factory, after the construction of a line along Stalin avenue and People's Army avenue, before the commencement of passenger traffic. Five trolleybuses were presented to him during this visit.

Andrei Lankov wrote that in the mid-1980s, the factory constructed trolleybuses in an extremely crude manner, with practically no mechanisation, such as the use of stamping or pressing equipment. Workers had to shape the material by hand through the use of sledgehammers, resulting in dents on the bodywork. Electrical wiring was said to be stretched across the ceiling.

During the period of fuel shortages in the Arduous March, the trolleybus factory converted diesel Karosa and Ikarus buses to electrical operation due to the scarcity of fuel, although electricity in that period was not easily available either. Many of these vehicles still run today and the electrification of these vehicles is a unique practice not seen anywhere else.

From 2015 to 2017, the trolleybus factory underwent its extensive refurbishment, introducing precision tools, such as CNC mills. The assembly line became partially automated with automated electroplating, heat processing and assembly of motors, done under the goal of transforming the factory into a 'world-class trolley bus manufacturer'. Plasma cutters were installed, greatly increasing the precision of work. Before the renovation, due to the lack of ability to produce electronic parts, they had to be sourced from China, leading to speculation that in the future, the trolleybus factory would only be responsible for making bodies and importing the other components.

In 2021, the factory set the goal of building a machine that would help build articulation sections with higher reliability and lower manpower. Previously, articulation joints used in the Chollima-091 were copies of the Ikarus 280 mechanism, which was liable to jamming and creaked loudly in service.

=== Export ===
Although the Pyongyang Trolleybus Factory has never made an export order, the Ministry of Housing and Communal services in the RSFSR in 1989 had shown an interest in a 12-metre trolleybuses to be used in Khabarovsk during the 13th World Festival of Youth and Students. However, as North Korea was heavily in debt to the CMEA and the USSR, the vehicles were only a form of currency that was to be produced as advanced payment for hard currency. With the collapse of the USSR, the only potential export deal fell through.

The trolleybus factory has advertised its products in the Foreign Trade of the DPRK magazine, most recently for the Chollima-321 in the 2019 Q3 edition of the magazine.

=== Assistance to other manufacturers ===
The Pyongyang Trolleybus Factory has also provided assistance to other trolleybus builders in the DPRK. In 2019, the factory provided assistance to the Pyongsong Transport Company in constructing three newer trolleybuses, two in the style of Chollima-321.

=== Other roles ===
The trolleybus factory has also designed other forms of transport, including infrastructure, trams and buses. Trolleybus systems of various cities were designed by the factory up until the Arduous March in the 1990s, based on Romanian and Bulgarian designs. The factory designs various machining tools in cooperation with universities.

== Operations ==
South Korean sources state that the factory employs 5000 people over an area of 630000 square metre area.

The factory is divided into the parts workshop, which builds various components such as trolley poles and other various parts, motor workshop for constructing the electrical motors and assembly workshop, where the final assembly takes place. Most of the components used in trolleybuses, such as the seats, are manufactured at the factory.

== Products ==
Since the 1970s, vehicles have been named according to the year in which they started production. The Chollima-321 is an exception to this, being first unveiled in 2018 and the Kwangbok Sonyon is the only vehicle that does not have a model number.

Trolleybuses
Name	Power	Max speed	Years of production	Number built
Chollima (Jinghua BK561)			1960	at least 1
clones of the Chinese Jinghua BK561
Chollima 9.11	60 kW	45 km/h	1961–1969	142
12 were built in 1961, 130 built in 1963–1964. The design is still based on the Jinghua BK561, but the frontal appearance is changed. They are relatively smaller trolleybuses at 9.5 metres long and has two doors. It is named for the day of the founding of the DPRK, September 11. Number 612, from the first batch of trolleybuses is a museum vehicle in the Trolleybus factory, as Kim Il Sung rode it in before the commencement of trolleybus services in Pyongyang. After it was withdrawn from passenger service, it was restored and placed in its current location. The trolleybus was built to be a present to the 4th Congress of the Workers' Party of Korea
Chollima 9.25	60 kW	45 km/h	1963 -1967	24 built by 1964
The Chollima 9.25 were the first articulated trolleybuses built in the DPRK. It is relatively short for an articulated vehicle at 13.5 metres. Some of these trolleybuses were transferred to Kowon County (the area with the trolleybus now split off into Sudong District) and Chongjin, where they launched the trolleybus services in these areas. Number 903 has been preserved as an honorary vehicle of Ryonmot depot, as Kim Il Sung rode it on 15 May 1964 and Kim Jong Il rode it on 14 May 1964. The trolleybus has a monocoque body with three doors on the right side. A special service trolleybus was developed on the basis of Chollima 9.25, using just the front section it.
Chollima 70	95 kW	45 km/h/48 km/h	1970 – at least 1974 (Note: Advertised alongside Chollima 74, indicating production at least until 1974.)	
5 vehicles are still running; 118 is an honorary vehicle of Munsu depot, 801 and 819 are honorary vehicles of Sanghung depot, as they have been ridden by Kim Il Sung. 822 is also an honorary vehicle, but its current disposition is unknown, after being transferred from the closed Palgol depot to Ryonmot depot. Seating capacity is 44 including the driver and a maximum capacity of 90 people. The design is based on the Škoda 706 RTO bus.
Chollima 72	95 kW	45 km/h	May 1972 – 1974	
The Chollima 72 is extremely similar to the Chollima 70, but is 30 cm higher. Only vehicle number 200, an honorary vehicle of Sanghung depot has survived, while others have been withdrawn or are otherwise unknown, including number 137, which despite being inspected by Kim Il Sung, has been replaced by a Chollima-091. The trolleybus has a monocoque body. A seat for the conductor is located at the rear door, since in the Pyongyang trolleybus system, passengers board at the rear. The drivers compartment is not accessed from the passenger cabin, as it has a dedicated door. A seat is placed to divide the driver's area with the passenger area. Other seating are arranged in two rows with two spaces on each seat. The chairs are upholstered in leather. The letters '천 리 마' are located above the grille, while the number '72' is placed on it.
Chollima 74 KA		65 km/h	KA and NA: 1974 – 1984	
Narrow doors, first single North Korean trolleybus to have three single leaf doors. The windows have sharp angles and are not rounded. Body length is 11.55 metres. The front has small metal letters '천 리 마 74' below the windscreen. Another version had rounded windows, but are not badged with Mangyongdae-ho 1979 on the front.
Chollima 74 NA		48 km/h		
The version has wide doors, similar to the Chollima-82 and 84. Seating for 34 passengers, full capacity 80 passengers. These vehicles were also used in Nampo, where they have worked since their introduction.
Chollima 74 'Mangyongdae-ho 1979'			1979 – ?	
Main difference is reverting to narrow doors compared to previous version. It also has embossed letters on the front reading '만 경 대 호 1979'. The windows have no sharp angles but are still in a similar layout to the 1st version
Chollima 80/82/84	95 kW	45 km/h	Chollima 82: around 1982 Chollima 84: 1984 – mid 1990s	
This vehicle most resembles the layout of the Chollima 74 NA, with wide doors and metal letters '천 리 마 82' on the front, below the windscreen. Chollima 84 instead have the metal letters '천 리 마 84' below the windscreen. All versions have a maximum capacity of 110 passengers, on a 11.9 metre body. These vehicles have also been used in Sinuiju.
Chollima 842	95 kW	36 km/h	1984 – presumably 1986	
Articulated variant of the Chollima 84. It was produced in small numbers and was superseded by the similar Chollima 862.
Chollima 862			1986–1989 or 1990	at least 64
It succeeded the Chollima 842 as the articulated trolleybus product, although there are no noticeable external differences. They have the metal letters '천 리 마 862' below the windscreen, although not all vehicles still have these badges. Number 281 is an honorary vehicle of Sanghung depot, as Kim Il Sung rode this vehicle on April 18, 1989. These vehicles are being replaced by the Chollima-091.
Chollima-90/903	95 kW	65 km/h	1990 – 2003	
The Chollima 90 brought a significant design change compared to the previous trolleybuses with a redesigned front that slopes forwards. The bottom edge of the winscreen is rounded. The vehicle is also known as Sogiryon, named after So Gi-ryon, the vice chairman of the Education Association of Chongryon who donated the funds for the construction of these trolleybuses. One vehicle was formerly on display in the Three Revolutions Exhibition, until it was replaced with a Chollima-091. Its current whereabouts are unknown. This model was the last serially produced trolleybus before the commencement of the Arduous March.
Purpose built cargo trolleybus				
Only a single copy built. The rear part of the trolleybus is open air. Despite North Korea being a left hand drive country, this vehicle has the steering wheel on the right of the vehicle.
Chollima-901, Chollima-902	95 kW (−901), 110 kW (−902)		1990 – ?	
Non-articulated version of the Chollima 90, 11.5 metres long. One vehicle has survived, as an overhead maintenance vehicle in Pyongchon depot. The Chollima-902 is powered by a 110 kW motor, but there are no other differences.
Chollima Kwangbok Sonyon			1992	3 or more
These are based on the same development as the Kwangboksonyon bus and in relation, the Chollima 90. It share the same layout with the Kwangboksonyon, featuring a driver's door and having only one passenger door in the front section. Unlike other trolleybuses, it has a grille at the front of the vehicle. The trolleybus version may still have a gas tank for an internal combustion engine. #133 was in the film Under the Sun, where it broke down and the next trolleybus behind is manually pushed to overtake it while it is de-energised.
Chollima-951 (Ikarus 260)			1995 – ?	
Diesel buses converted to trolleybuses during fuel shortages. These trolleybuses are also used in Unjong-guyok, which formerly belonged to Pyongsong until administration was given to Pyongyang. Three are departmental vehicles with an overhead tower.
Chollima-951 (Ikarus 280)			1995 – ?	25
Articulated trolleybuses converted from Ikarus 280. There were also vehicles built by connecting two Ikarus 260 with an articulation joint.
Chollima-952 (Ikarus 255)			1995 – ?	2
Converted from the long-distance coach Ikarus 255, both vehicles are work cars with overhead towers for wire maintenance.
Chollima-961			1996 – last known between 2008 and 2014	at least 32
Rebuilds from Shenyang ST4 without a trailer. Another source says built from 1999 onwards.
Chollima-971			1997 – ?	
Rebuilds from Shenyang ST4 after the trams were withdrawn. The withdrawn tram bodies are reused, while some vehicles are modernised into Chollima-961 by removing the articulation joint and shortening the trolleybus.
Chollima-973 (Karosa B731/Karosa B732)			1997 – ? or 1996 onwards	
Electrification of diesel Karosa buses. These bodies originally have three doors Chollima-973, based on Karosa B731 Original badge replaced with badge of Pyongyang Trolleybus Factory. These vehicles are relatively rarer compared to the Karosa C734 variant at 8 vehicles in service compared to more than 50 of the C734.
Chollima-973 (Karosa C734)			1997 – ? or late 1990s onwards	at least 86
Electrification of diesel Karosa C734 long-distance coach; it has two doors Some vehicles have a Chongnyonjonwi lettering on the front. Original badge is replaced with badge of Pyongyang Trolleybus Factory Second most common vehicle in the Pyongyang trolleybus network. Some vehicles are equipped with overhead maintenance towers.
Chollima-011			2002	2
There were two vehicles built, one articulated and the other a single trolleybus although both vehicles shared the same designation. They were not serially produced, and the vehicles featured updated features, such as two panel doors instead of four leaf folding doors. The articulated vehicle was built in 2002 and scrapped in 2018. In the trolleybus factory museum, the articulated vehicle is named 'Kangsongdaeguk-ho' and is labeled as being built in 2005 instead. The articulated vehicle differed that the glazing on the front extended to the route indicator, whereas on the non-articulated vehicle, the route indicator had its own window with two other small openings on either side. Both vehicles ran on the West Pyongyang – Pyongchon route.
Chollima-091	130 kW	86 km/h	2009–2018	at least 184
Most common vehicle in the Pyongyang trolleybus network. Steered and driven axles are built by CNHTC, trailed axle is built by Fuwa.
Chollima-316	1.2 times more traction force than Chollima-091		2016–2018	20
These were the first serially produced 2 axle trolleybuses in Pyongyang since the conversions from the Karosa buses 20 vehicles are distributed among the lines in Pyongyang, with each line having one to three vehicles. The factory also built a trolleybus with dynamic recharging, although this does not appear to have been applied on other trolleybuses. It involved installing batteries under seats arranged along the sides of the trolleybus, which would allows it to travel without having the trolley pole contact the overhead network. Compared to the Chollima-091, this model is the first introduces LED displays and has a lower floor height, although it is still a high floor vehicle. It has a dedicated seat for the conductor. The windows on this trolleybus are similar in size to windows for a fully low floor trolleybus. Steering axles are built by CNHTC, driven axles are built by Rába. 92% of components are domestically produced.
Chollima-321	1.4 times more traction force than Chollima-316	Operational max: 40 km/h	2018 – currently produced	at least 44
Chollima-321 is the currently manufactured model at the Pyongyang trolleybus factory Number 483 is an honorary vehicle; Kim Jong Un rode it on the night of 3 August. Steering axles are built by CNHTC. First trolleybus since the Chollima 82/84 to be sent to cities outside of Pyongyang.

Other vehicles
Name	
Chollima 80	Overhead maintenance vehicles painted in orange and are based on the Taepaeksan-70 chassis
Pyongyang 9.25	Two axle petrol bus, produced in 1963 and based on the front section of the Chollima 9.25.
Pyongyang-951	Also called Sonlo. Overhead maintenance vehicles painted in orange, with a blue and white interior.
Kwangbok Sonyon	Large articulated bus, one was inspected by Kim Jong Il in April 1990. Name is shared with trolleybus versions of this vehicle. It is fitted with a dedicated door for the driver on the left side and has three doors in total for passenger access; the front section has only one door at the centre while the rear section has two.
Pyongyang-62	A van, with the option of either a closed cargo storage in the rear or passenger seats.
Battery electric vehicles	Small sightseeing battery electric vehicles for the Wonsan-Kalma tourist resort.
