= Chiktong Tangwang station =

Railway station in North Korea

Chiktong T'an'gwang 직동탄광

Korean name
- Hangul: 직동탄광역
- Hanja: 直洞炭鑛驛
- Revised Romanization: Jikdongtan-gwang-yeok
- McCune–Reischauer: Chiktongt'an'gwang-yŏk

General information
- Location: Chik-tong, Sunch'ŏn-si, South P'yŏngan; North Korea
- Coordinates: 39.4939°N 126.0299°E
- Owner: Korean State Railway
- Line: Ŭnsan Line

Services
Preceding station	Korean State Railway	Following station
Puhŭng towards Taegŏn	Chiktong Colliery Line	Terminus
Location

Chiktong T'an'gwang station (Chiktong Colliery station) is a railway station in Chik-tong, Sunch'ŏn city, South P'yŏngan province, North Korea. It is the terminus of the Chiktong Colliery Line of the Korean State Railway.
