= Ryongsong Line =

Railway line in North Korea

Ryongsŏng Line

Overview
- Native name: 룡성선 (龍城線)
- Status: Operational
- Owner: Korean State Railway
- Locale: P'yŏngyang
- Termini: Sŏp'o; Tongbungri
- Stations: 4

Service
- Type: Heavy rail, Passenger/freight rail Intercity rail, Regional rail
- Operator(s): Korean State Railway
- Depot(s): Ryongsŏng (for Leader's trains)

History
- Opened: 1 November 1927

Technical
- Line length: 15.3 km (9.5 mi)
- Number of tracks: Single track
- Track gauge: 1,435 mm (4 ft 8 1/2 in) standard gauge
- Electrification: 3000 V DC Overhead line

- Ryongsong Line
- Hangul: 룡성선
- Hanja: 龍城線
- RR: Ryongseongseon
- MR: Ryongsŏngsŏn

The Ryongsŏng Line is an electrified standard-gauge secondary line of the Korean State Railway in P'yŏngyang, North Korea, running from Sŏp'o on the P'yŏngŭi Line to Tongbungri on the P'yŏngra Line. From Ryongsŏng, this line also has a line connecting to the private railway station attached to Residence No. 55, the primary residence of Kim Jong-un. The maintenance facilities for the North Korean leaders' trains are also located at Ryongsŏng Station.

== History ==
The line was originally opened by the Chosen Government Railway on 1 November 1927 as part of the first section of the former P'yŏngwŏn Line from Sŏp'o to Sainjang (nowadays called P'yŏngsŏng Station). After the establishment of the DPRK, the Korean State Railway created the P'yŏngra Line by merging the P'yŏngwŏn Line with parts of the Hamgyŏng and Ch'ŏngra lines, at which time the Sŏp'o—Tongbungri section of the former P'yŏngwŏn Line was separated to create the current Ryongsŏng Line.

== Route ==
A yellow background in the "Distance" box indicates that section of the line is not electrified.

Distance (km)		Station Name		Former Name		
Total	S2S	Transcribed	Chosŏn'gŭl (Hanja)	Transcribed	Chosŏn'gŭl (Hanja)	Connections
0.0	0.0	Sŏp'o	서포 (西浦)			P'yŏngŭi Line
6.0	6.0	Ryongsŏng	룡성 (龍城)			
13.1	7.1	Saedong	새동 (-)	Maram	마람 (馬嵐)	
15.3	2.2	Tongbungri	동북리 (東北里)			P'yŏngra Line

=== San'um Branch ===
Electrified.

Distance (km)		Station Name		Former Name		
Total	S2S	Transcribed	Chosŏn'gŭl (Hanja)	Transcribed	Chosŏn'gŭl (Hanja)	Connections
0.0	0.0	San'um	산움 (山陰)			P'yŏngŭi Line
6.6	6.6	No. 55 Residence	55호 관저			
