= Unsan County, South Pyongan =

Ŭnsan County 은산군
- County

Korean transcription(s)
  - Chosŏn'gŭl: 은산군
  - Hancha: 殷山郡
  - McCune-Reischauer: Ŭnsan-gun
  - Revised Romanization: Eunsan-gun
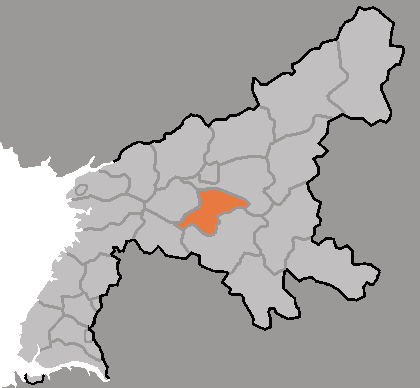
- Map of South Pyongan showing the location of Unsan
- Country: North Korea
- Province: South P'yŏngan
- Administrative divisions: 1 ŭp, 5 workers' districts, 16 ri

Area
  - Total: 810.2 km^{2} (312.8 sq mi)

Population (2008)
  - Total: 206,407
  - Density: 254.8/km^{2} (659.8/sq mi)

Ŭnsan County is a kun (county) in South P'yŏngan province, North Korea.

== Name ==
The name Unsan is proposed to have been derived from either the Chinese character 银 or 隐, both read as "un" in Korean, referring to the possibility of silver being mined in a mine located in Sinchang, or 'hidden', as the area is surrounded by mountains, such as Hwasan. However, in historical records, only the word 殷 has been recorded as a name.

== History ==
Hungdok-gun, the predecessor to the current administrative division, was formed in the early Goguryeo period from Sunchon-gun. This later became Unju in 983 and subsequently Unsan-hyon in 1278. In 1414, after the establishment of the Joseon, it was briefly absorbed into Chasan-gun, then reestablished in 1415. In 1895, the myon was reorganised into a gun and subsequently was changed into a hyon in 1896. It was again absorbed into Sunchon-gun in 1907 and reestablished in 1952.

In 1954, the original Unsan-up and Suwon-ri were merged and renamed to Sinchang-ri, while parts of Jinsan-ri and Sonam-ri became the new Unsan-up.

In 1974, several dongs were promoted to rodongjagu amongst a large scale reorganisation of districts, with some districts joining Sunchon.

In 1994, Sinpyong-ri was transferred to Pukchang County.

By the 1990s, Kubong-rodongjagu had been developed into a large mining town, with over 4600 residences and various services, such as hospitals, culture halls and schools.

== Administrative divisions ==
Ŭnsan county is divided into 1 ŭp (town), 5 rodongjagu (workers' districts) and 16 ri (villages):

- Ŭnsan-ŭp (은산읍)
- Chaedong-rodongjagu (재동로동자구)
- Ch'ŏnsŏng-rodongjagu (천성로동자구)
- Haksal-lodongjagu (학산로동자구)
- Kubong-rodongjagu (구봉로동자구)
- Sŏngsal-lodongjagu (성산로동자구)
- Chehyŏl-li (제현리)
- Mang'il-li (망일리)
- Mirjŏl-li (밀전리)
- Nam'ong-ri (남옥리)
- Namwŏl-li (남원리)
- Sinch'ang-ri (신창리)
- Sudŏng-ri (수덕리)
- Sunghwa-ri (숭화리)
- Suwŏl-li (수원리)
- Suyang-ri (수양리)
- Taeyang-ri (대양리)
- Tongsam-ri (동삼리)
- Yonghwa-ri (용화리)
- Yŏnham-ri (연합리)
- Yudong-ri (유동리)
- Yujŏng-ri (유정리)

== Transportation ==
Ŭnsan County is served by the P'yŏngra and Ŭnsan lines of the Korean State Railway.

A trolleybuses existed in Kubong-rodongjagu, serving the Ryongdae Mine. This line had a stated length of 10-ri with 4 stops, connecting the workers' district to the entrance 2nd pit of Ryongdae Mine. Services run 24 hours a day, 7 days a week.
