= Sunchon station =

Railway station in North Korea

Sunch'ŏn 순천

Korean name
- Hangul: 순천역
- Hanja: 順川驛
- Revised Romanization: Suncheon-yeok
- McCune–Reischauer: Sunch'ŏn-yŏk

General information
- Location: Sunch'ŏn, South P'yŏngan Province; North Korea
- Coordinates: 39°25′22″N 125°56′12″E
- Owner: Korean State Railway
- Lines: P'yŏngra Line; Manp'o Line

History
- Opened: 15 October 1928
- Original company: Chosen Government Railway

Services
| Preceding station | Korean State Railway | Following station |
|---|---|---|
| Chasan towards P'yŏngyang | P'yŏngra Line | Sillyŏnp'o towards Rajin |
| Chungp'yŏng towards Manp'o Ch'ŏngnyŏn | Manp'o Line | Terminus |
Location

Sunchon station is a railway station in Sunch'ŏn municipal city, South P'yŏngan province, North Korea on the P'yŏngra Line of the Korean State Railway; it is also the starting point of the Manp'o Line.

== History ==
The station was opened on 15 October 1928 by the Chosen Government Railway, along with the rest of the second section of the former P'yŏngwŏn Line from P'yŏngsŏng to Sunch'ŏn; this later became part of the P'yŏngra Line.
