= Taegon station =

Railway station in North Korea

Coordinates: 39°26′14″N 125°59′28″E

Taegŏn 대건

Korean name
- Hangul: 대건역
- Hanja: 戴建驛
- Revised Romanization: Daegeon-nyeok
- McCune–Reischauer: Taegŏn-nyŏk

General information
- Location: Chŭngsan-dong, Sunch'ŏn-si, South P'yŏngan; North Korea
- Owner: Korean State Railway
- Lines: Chiktong Colliery Line; Mohak Line; Taegŏn Branch; Ŭnsan Line

Services
Preceding station	Korean State Railway	Following station
Terminus	Chiktong Colliery Line	Pusalli towards Chiktong T'an'gwang
Terminus	Mohak Line	Mohak Terminus
Sillyŏnp'o Terminus	Taegŏn Line	Terminus
Terminus	Ŭnsan Line	Haksan towards Ŭnsan
Location

Taegŏn station is a railway station in Chŭngsan-dong, Sunch'ŏn city, South P'yŏngan Province, North Korea, on the Taegŏn Line of the Korean State Railway, where it connects with the Ŭnsan Line to Ŭnsan on the Pyongra Line. It is also the starting point of the Chiktong Colliery Line to the colliery at Chiktong T'an'gwang and of the Mohak Line to Mohak.
