= Oedong station (Kaechon) =

Railway station in North Korea

Coordinates: 39°33′39″N 126°01′50″E

Oedong 외동

Korean name
- Hangul: 외동역
- Hanja: 外東驛
- Revised Romanization: Oedong-yeok
- McCune–Reischauer: Oedong-yŏk

General information
- Location: Oedong-ri, Kaech'ŏn, South P'yŏngan; North Korea
- Owner: Korean State Railway
- Line: Taegŏn Line

Services
Preceding station	Korean State Railway	Following station
Mujindae towards Sillyŏnp'o	Taegŏn Line	Pongch'ang Terminus
Location

Oedong station is a railway station in Oedong-ri, Kaech'ŏn county, South P'yŏngan province, North Korea, on the Taegŏn Line of the Korean State Railway.
