= Sopyongyang station =

Railway station in Pyongyang, North Korea

Sŏp'yŏngyang West P'yŏngyang 서평양

Korean name
- Hangul: 서평양역
- Hanja: 西平壤驛
- Revised Romanization: Seopyeongyang-yeok
- McCune–Reischauer: Sŏp'yŏngyang-yŏk

General information
- Location: Sŏsŏng-guyŏk, P'yŏngyang; North Korea
- Coordinates: 39.0529°N 125.7263°E
- Owner: Korean State Railway
- Connections: Tram Line 3

History
- Opened: 16 November 1929
- Original company: Chosen Government Railway

Services
Preceding station	Korean State Railway	Following station
P'yŏngyang Terminus	P'yŏngra Line	Sŏp'o towards Rajin
Sŏp'o towards Dandong (China)	P'yŏngŭi Line	P'yŏngyang Terminus
Location

Sŏp'yŏngyang station (West P'yŏngyang station) is a railway station in Sŏsŏng-guyŏk, P'yŏngyang, North Korea. It is located on the P'yŏngra and P'yŏngŭi lines of the Korean State Railway.

Local transit connections can be made to Line 3 of the P'yŏngyang tram system.

== History ==
The station was originally opened by the Chosen Government Railway on 16 November 1929.
