= Mohak station =

Railway station in North Korea

Korean name
- Hangul: 모학역
- Hanja: 慕鶴驛
- Revised Romanization: Mo Hakyeok
- McCune–Reischauer: Mo Hakyŏk

General information
- Location: Sunch'ŏn-si; South P'yŏngan; North Korea
- Coordinates: 39.439666°N 126.007931°E
- Owner: Korean State Railway
- Line: Mohak Line

Construction
- Structure type: at-grade

Services
Preceding station	Korean State Railway	Following station
Taegŏn Terminus	Mohak Line	Terminus
Location

Mohak station (모학역) is a railway station in North Korea.
