= Sinyang station =

Railway station in North Korea

Sinyang

General information
- Location: North Korea
- Coordinates: 39.2790°N 126.4538°E
- Operator: Korean State Railway
- Line: P'yŏngra Line

Services
| Preceding station | Korean State Railway | Following station |
|---|---|---|
| Changrim towards P'yŏngyang | P'yŏngra Line | Inp'yŏng towards Rajin |
Location

Sinyang station is a railway station in North Korea. It is located on the P'yŏngra Line of the Korean State Railway. In November 1936, tha station was opened as Dongwon Station with the opening of the Jangnim-Yangdeok section of the Pyeongwon Line.
