= Ungok station =

Railway station in North Korea

Coordinates: 39.3883°N 126.7865°E

Ungok station is a railway station in North Korea. It is located on the P'yŏngra Line of the Korean State Railway.

Preceding station	Korean State Railway	Following station
Ch'ŏnŭl towards P'yŏngyang	P'yŏngra Line	Yodŏk towards Rajin
