= Changsongang station =

Railway station in North Korea

Changsŏn'gang 장선강

Korean name
- Hangul: 장선강역
- Hanja: 長鮮江驛
- Revised Romanization: Jangseongang-yeok
- McCune–Reischauer: Changsŏn'gang-yŏk

General information
- Location: Ŭnsan, South P'yŏngan; North Korea
- Owner: Korean State Railway
- Line: P'yŏngra Line

Services
Preceding station	Korean State Railway	Following station
Terminus	Changsŏn'gang Line	Ŭnsan Terminus

Changsŏn'gang station is a railway station in Ŭnsan county, South P'yŏngan province, North Korea. It is the terminus of the Changsŏn'gang Line of the Korean State Railway.
