= Unsan station =

Railway station in North Korea

Ŭnsan 은산

Korean name
- Hangul: 은산역
- Hanja: 殷山驛
- Revised Romanization: Eunsan-yeok
- McCune–Reischauer: Ŭnsan-yŏk

General information
- Location: Ŭnsan-ŭp, Ŭnsan, South P'yŏngan; North Korea
- Coordinates: 39.4079°N 126.0200°E
- Owner: Korean State Railway
- Lines: Pyongra Line; Ŭnsan Line

Services
Preceding station	Korean State Railway	Following station
Sillyŏnp'o towards P'yŏngyang	P'yŏngra Line	Suyang towards Rajin
Changsŏn'gang Terminus	Changsŏn'gang Line	Terminus
Haksan towards Taegŏn	Ŭnsan Line	Terminus
Location

Ŭnsan station is a railway station in Ŭnsan-ŭp, Ŭnsan county, South P'yŏngan province, North Korea. It is the junction point of the Korean State Railway's P'yŏngra and Ŭnsan lines. It is also the starting point of the P'yŏngra line's Changsŏn'gang Line.
