= Mohak Line =

Railway line in North Korea

Overview
- Native name: 모학선
- Status: Operational
- Owner: Korean State Railway
- Locale: South P'yŏngan
- Termini: Taegŏn; Mohak
- Stations: 2

Service
- Type: Heavy rail, freight rail
- Operator(s): Korean State Railway

Technical
- Line length: 2.6 km (1.6 mi)
- Number of tracks: Single track
- Track gauge: 1,435 mm (4 ft 8 1/2 in) standard gauge
- Electrification: 3000 V DC Overhead line

- Mohak Line
- Hangul: 모학선
- Hanja: 慕鶴線
- RR: Mohakseon
- MR: Mohaksŏn

The Mohak Line is an electrified standard-gauge freight-only secondary line of the Korean State Railway in South P'yŏngan Province, North Korea, running from Taegŏn on the Ŭnsan Line to Mohak, where it serves the large Sunch'ŏn Cement Complex.

== Route ==
Distance (km)		Station Name		Former Name		
Total	S2S	Transcribed	Chosŏn'gŭl (Hanja)	Transcribed	Chosŏn'gŭl (Hanja)	Connections
0.0	0.0	Taegŏn	대건 (戴建)			Chiktong Colliery Line, Taegŏn Line, Ŭnsan Line
1.4	1.4	Mohak	모학 (慕鶴)			
2.6	1.2	Sunch'ŏn Cement Complex	순천 세멘뜨 련합기업소 (順川 세멘뜨 聯合企業所)			
