= Ponghak Line =

North Korean railway line

Overview
- Native name: 봉학선 (鳳鶴線)
- Status: Operational
- Owner: Korean State Railway
- Locale: P'yŏngsŏng-si, South P'yŏngan
- Termini: Ponghak; Songudong
- Stations: 2

Service
- Type: Heavy rail, Freight rail
- Operator: Korean State Railway

Technical
- Line length: 1.2 km (0.75 mi)
- Number of tracks: Single track
- Track gauge: 1,435 mm (4 ft 8 1/2 in) standard gauge

The Ponghak Line is a non-electrified standard-gauge freight-only branch line of the Korean State Railway in P'yŏngsŏng city, South P'yŏngan Province, North Korea, running from Ponghak on the P'yŏngra Line to serve a number of industries around Songudong east of Ponghak Station.

== Route ==
A yellow background in the "Distance" box indicates that section of the line is not electrified.

Distance (km)		Station Name		Former Name		
Total	S2S	Transcribed	Chosŏn'gŭl (Hanja)	Transcribed	Chosŏn'gŭl (Hanja)	Connections
0.0	0.0	Ponghak	봉학 (鳳鶴)			P'yŏngra Line
1.2	1.2	Songudong	손구동			
