= Chollima-321 =

Trolleybus of North Korea

- In service: 2018-
- Manufacturer: Pyongyang Trolleybus Factory
- Assembly: Pyongyang
- Replaced: Chollima-951, 971, 973
- Constructed: August 2018-
- Entered service: September 2018-
- Number built: ≥44
- Number in service: ≥44
- Predecessor: Chollima-316

Specifications
- Low-floor: High floor
- Entry: step
- Doors: 3 planetary doors
- Maximum speed: Operational max 40 kilometres per hour (25 mph)
- Power supply: 300-700V DC
- Electric system(s): Alternating current

The Chollima-321 (Korean: 천리마-321) is a North Korean trolleybus with battery power built by the Pyongyang Trolley Bus Factory. The name 'Chollima' refers to a myth about a winged horse that has since been adopted as the name of North Korea's Stakhanovite movement. The production of the Chollima-321 production replaced the Chollima-091 articulated trolleybus, due to the need to replace older Chollima-961, -951, Ikarus and Karosa bus based trolleybuses. The trolleybus features on a 50 won stamp.

In Japanese sources, it is called the Mallima-312.

== Design ==
The new trolleybus was first tested at night, with Kim Jong-un on board, which had become a tradition for the testing of new modes of public transport. Before that, Kim Jong-un had visited the trolleybus factory, confirming the specifications of the trolleybus, such as the door width. The vehicle that he had ridden on would be numbered 483, in honour of the route he had taken, and the date on which he had tested it, August 3. The production vehicles differ that there is an additional blinker above the headlights, different lights on the rear and a ladder to the roof at the rear. The first seat is reserved for 'heroes'.

The trolleybus has a digital dashboard that monitors the overhead wire voltage, speed and battery voltage. It features a TV manufactured by Potonggang Electronics Factory. Like the Chollima-316, it has LED indicators for the route on front and rear, but the Chollima-321 also has one inside. The vehicle has no air conditioner. A new type of motor, which is more efficient than previous models was introduced on this trolleybus.

This model demonstrated that the trolleybus factory had mastered the use of plastic moulding, which was reported as achieved through CNC machines and plasma cutters. It is claimed that almost all parts are built at the factory, which after its refurbishment completed in early 2018, featured a full assembly line for trolleybuses, from framing to painting of the vehicle, with the plating of trolleybuses being automated. A new production process of curved glass was reportedly created for the use in electric public transport. Other production processes that were upgraded for its production included induction furnaces and heating furnaces, used for forging of parts.

Up until January 2020, it was reported 'more than 100' trolleybuses have been manufactured in recent years, and that despite shortages in 2019, the production was pushed ahead.

The design of the Chollima-321 has been displayed at the national industrial design exhibition in celebration of the 75th anniversary of the founding of the Workers' Party of Korea. Its design has inspired other factories, such as the Chongjin Bus Factory, which serially produced 20 new trolleybuses in a design clearly inspired by the Chollima-321. Other similar models have been built in Hamhung and Pyongsong. The design and colour scheme of the trolleybus is similar to the 'Thongil' tram that was manufactured at the same time.

== Service ==
There are currently 42 known Chollima-321 trolleybuses known to be in operation. Other vehicles, such as the trolleybuses in Chongjin are a completely different model, named 'Jipsan'.

City	Quantity	Numbers	Notes
Pyongyang	≥20	Assigned various numbers from 181 to 625, with one number being formerly occupied by a Chollima-091	In service since 2018.
Wonsan	20	110 to 130	Delivered in a ceremony in April 2019, as a gift by Kim Jong-un.
Sinuiju	≥1	Only known vehicle is 611	Used the chassis of an older trolleybus, most likely a Chollima-82. Trolleybus services in Sinuiju were suspended from December 2018, and were restarted with the launch of this vehicle in October 2020.
Huichon	≥2	111, 115	Unknown date of delivery
Kanggye	≥1	105	
