= Ponghak station =

Railway station in North Korea

Ponghak 봉학

Korean name
- Hangul: 봉학역
- Hanja: 鳳鶴驛
- Revised Romanization: Bonghak-yeok
- McCune–Reischauer: Ponghak-yŏk

General information
- Location: P'yŏngsŏng-si, South P'yŏngan; North Korea
- Coordinates: 39.2976°N 125.8849°E
- Owner: Korean State Railway
- Lines: Ponghak Line, P'yŏngra Line

Services
Preceding station	Korean State Railway	Following station
Terminus	Ponghak Line	Songudong Terminus
P'yŏngsŏng towards P'yŏngyang	P'yŏngra Line	Chasan towards Rajin
Location

Ponghak station is a railway station in P'yŏngsŏng city, South P'yŏngan Province, North Korea. It is located on the P'yŏngra Line of the Korean State Railway.
