= 순천역 =

순천역 may refer to stations:

- Suncheon station (順天驛), in Suncheon, Jeollanam-do, South Korea
- Sunch'ŏn station (順川驛), in Sunch'ŏn, South P'yŏngan province, North Korea
