= Sopo station =

Railway station in Pyongyang, North Korea

Coordinates: 39°05′19″N 125°44′05″E

Sŏp'o 서포

Korean name
- Hangul: 서포역
- Hanja: 西浦驛
- Revised Romanization: Seopo-yeok
- McCune–Reischauer: Sŏp'o-yŏk

General information
- Location: Sŏp'o-dong, Hyongjesan-guyŏk, P'yŏngyang; North Korea
- Owner: Korean State Railway

History
- Opened: 1 April 1908

Services
Preceding station	Korean State Railway	Following station
West P'yŏngyang towards P'yŏngyang	P'yŏngra Line	Kalli towards Rajin
Kalli towards Dandong (China)	P'yŏngŭi Line	West P'yŏngyang towards P'yŏngyang
Location

Sŏp'o station is a railway station in Sŏp'o-dong, Hyongjesan-guyŏk, P'yŏngyang, North Korea. It is located on the P'yŏngra and P'yŏngŭi lines of the Korean State Railway.

== History ==
The station was opened on 1 April 1908, along with the rest of the former Kyŏngŭi Line, from which the P'yŏngŭi line was formed after the division of Korea.

== Operations ==
There is an international cargo terminal at the station, which handles international freight traffic between P'yŏngyang and China. All passenger trains heading to and from P'yŏngyang on the P'yŏngra and P'yŏngŭi lines pass through this station.
