= Pyongsong =

Coordinates: 39.26052115420082°N 125.8617618490665°E

Pyongsong 평성시
- Municipal City
- Phyongsong

Korean transcription(s)
  - Chosŏn'gŭl: 평성시
  - Hancha: 平城市
  - McCune-Reischauer: P'yŏngsŏng-si
  - Revised Romanization: Pyeongseong-si
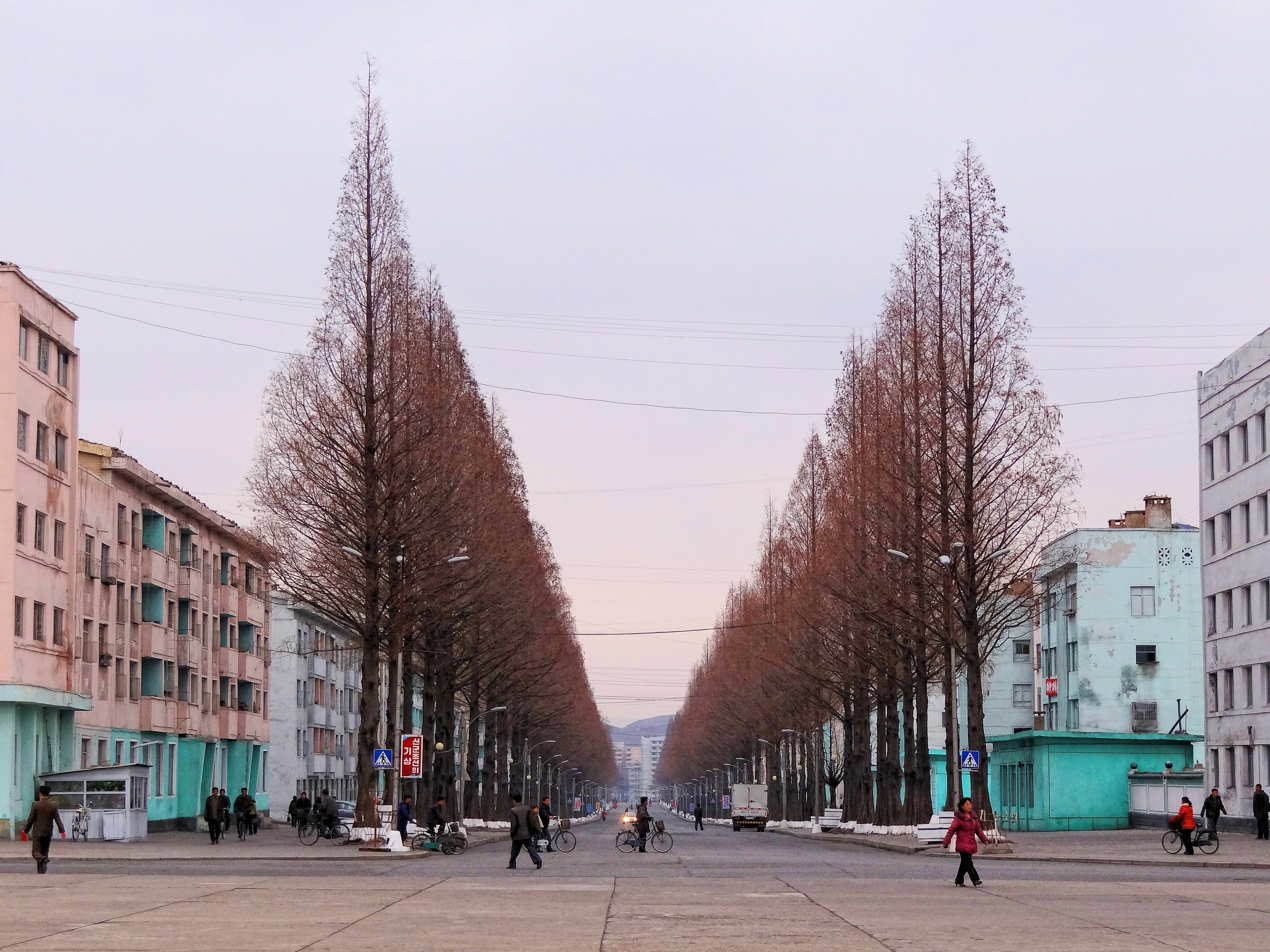
- City centre

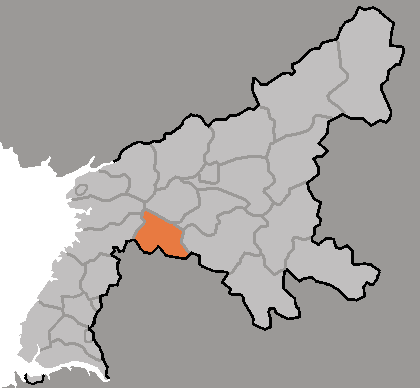
- Map of South Pyongan showing the location of Pyongsong

- Location within North Korea
- Country: North Korea
- Province: South P'yŏngan
- Administrative divisions: 20 tong, 14 ri

Area
  - Municipal City: 381 km^{2} (147 sq mi)

Population (2008)
  - Municipal City: 284,386
  - Density: 746/km^{2} (1,930/sq mi)
  - Urban: 236,609
  - Dialect: P'yŏngan
- Time zone: UTC+9 (Pyongyang Time)

Pyongsong (평성, Korean pronunciation: [pʰjʌŋ.sʌŋ], officially Phyongsong) is a city in North Korea, the capital city of South Pyongan province in western North Korea. The city is located about 32 kilometres (19.88 miles) northeast of Pyongyang, and was formally established in December 1969. It has a population of 284,386.

== History ==
The area that is now Pyongsong was formerly Pyongyang and South Pyongan Province. This was first formed in 1965 from various parts of the two regions, and was designated a gu (district). Various other parts were merged into the district, and it was promoted to si (city) in 1969, also becoming the capital of South Pyongan Province. South Korean sources claim that Kim Il-sung named the city. The name comes from combining Pyongyang and the word for fortress in Korean.

In 1995, Toksong-dong, Paesan-dong, Songnyong-dong and a part of Jikyong-dong were split from the city and placed under the jurisdiction of Pyongyang through Unjong-guyok. The rest of Jikyong-dong was absorbed by Hacha-dong and it was abolished.

On 27 November 2017, a Hwasong-15 was fired from the city.

== Administrative divisions ==
P'yŏngsŏng-si is divided into 20 dong (neighbourhoods) and 14 ri (villages):

- Chungdŏk-dong (중덕동)
- Churye-dong (주례동)
- Hach'a-dong (하차동)
- Haksu-dong (학수동)
- Kuwŏl-dong (구월동)
- Munhwa-dong (문화동)
- Okchŏn-dong (옥전동)
- Ori-dong (오리동)
- Podŏk-dong (보덕동)
- Samhwa-dong (삼화동)
- Sangch'a-dong (상차동)
- Ŭndŏk-dong (은덕동)
- Yangji-dong (양지동)
- Yŏkch'ŏn-dong (역전동)
- Chamo-ri (자모리)
- Chasal-li (자산리)
- Ch'ŏng'ong-ri (청옥리)
- Hadal-li (하단리)
- Hut'al-li (후탄리)
- Hwap'o-ri (화포리)
- Koch'ŏl-li (고천리)
- Kyŏngsil-li (경신리)
- Ŏjung-ri (어중리)
- Paeksong-ri (백송리)
- Ryulhwa-ri (률화리)
- Samryong-ri (삼룡리)
- Unhŭng-ri (운흥리)
- Wŏlp'o-ri (월포리)
- Songryŏng-dong (송령동)
- Ponghak-dong (봉학동)
- P'yŏngsŏng-dong (평성동)
- Raengch'ŏn-dong (랭천동)
- Tŏksŏng-dong (덕성동)
- Tumu-dong (두무동)

== Economy ==
The city has small scale nuclear and physics research facilities, which are controlled by the State Academy of Sciences.

28% of the land is used for farming and fruits are grown in the villages.

Due to location and good transport, P'yŏngsŏng-si is the location of many wholesale businesses importing products from China. This is because many traders do not possess travel permits to enter Pyongyang and with Pyongsong being the point where permits to enter Pyongyang are checked, they must resell their goods onwards at Pyongsong. These markets also sell onto other cities, including Haeju and Sariwon. It is also more efficient to send goods to the east coast cities of Wonsan than directly from Sinuiju. In 2009, the market was split into two smaller ones, because allegedly, the market was seen as a threat due to its capitalistic influence according to the Korea Herald.

=== Industry ===
The Phyongsong Synthetic Leather factory, the Phyongsong rubber band factory, an agricultural machine factory and the Moranbong watch factory are four major factories in the city.

==== March 16 Factory/ Phyongnam General Machine Plant ====
The largest and most important factory in Pyongsong is March 16 factory, also known as the Pyongsang Auto Works, with an area of 248000m² and employing an estimated 7000 to 8000 people. It was established on 16 March 1977. However, its location is disputed, as it is supposed to be located in Kuwol-dong, while south Korean sources claim that it part of the Thaebaeksan company, which is listed in Paesan-dong, and would thus be a part of Pyongyang.

The factory has roads leading to Pyongyang and Sunchon, and has produced the Kaengsang 69 and Kaengsang 85 jeeps, the Taebaeksan truck series, armoured vehicles and more recently, the Taebaeksan-96, a locally assembled KamAZ-55111 as a result of a 2007 partnership with Kamaz. The factory also likely produces or modifies transporter erector launchers, used to carry the Hwasong-15 missile and modifies Sinotruck vehicles to be multiple rocket launchers. Although the production of KamAZ trucks possibly ended in 2010, other models of KamAZ trucks were still seen in the facility.

A temporary structure was built in 2017, which appeared to be used to support the development of TEL vehicles, similar to those at the No.65 Factory at Jonchon.

In 2019, various buildings were reconstructed, likely as ordered by Kim Jong-un. All roads within the factory were repaved and some structures were removed, while a livestock facility saw some progress. However, the roads within the factory still appear to have turn radii too small for the TEL of the Hwasong-15, potentially indicating that large scale production of these vehicles had not yet occurred, although NK News analysts believe that it could be nonetheless a step towards production.

=== Education ===
Having been initially established with the idea of functioning as a center for North Korea's science and technology sectors, Pyongsong-si is the location of several colleges, universities, and research center:

- Pyongsong University of Science - reputed to include a nuclear physics department, the researchers of which contribute to North Korea's nuclear program. The department runs the Atomic Energy Research Institute.
- Pyongsong University of Medicine (functions as South Pyongan province's regional medical training institute)
- Space Science Research Institute
- Phyongsong University of Veterinary Science and Animal Husbandry

== Nature ==
Pyongsong is located at an average of 100–200 metres above sea level, although the western part of the city is mostly mountains. Forests cover 53% of the city, consisting various trees, such as oak, birch, acacia, maple and alder trees. Pyongsong has a continental climate. There are various precious metals located in the area. The Taedong River flows through the city.

== Transport ==
P'yŏngsŏng-si has two stations on the P'yŏngra Line of the Korean State Railway, one in P'yŏngsŏng-dong and one in Ponghak-dong.

Pyongsong has one trolleybus line. The network opened on August 4, 1983, from Munwha-dong to Pyongsong station and extended in 1992 by 5.2 km to Paesan-dong. However, between 1996 and 2005, the line between Pyongsong station and Kwangmyong-dong (now part of Unjong-guyok, Pyongyang) was cut, splitting the originally connected lines, likely as a result of the division of the city. In 2015, there were around 12 trolleybuses including three articulated trolleybuses reported to be in service on the Munhwa-dong to Pyongsong station line, reduced to 8 trolleybuses after the articulated trolleybuses were retired between 2015 and 2020.

== Sister cities ==
- Pernik, Bulgaria
- Bhaktapur, Nepal
