= Kowon Tangwang Line =

Railway line in North Korea

Kowŏn Colliery Line

Overview
- Native name: 고원탄광선(高原炭鑛線)
- Status: Operational
- Owner: Korean State Railway
- Locale: Sudong-gu, South Hamgyŏng
- Termini: Tunjŏn; Changdong
- Stations: 4

Service
- Type: Heavy rail, Freight rail Regional rail
- Operator(s): Korean State Railway

Technical
- Line length: 17.6 km (10.9 mi)
- Number of tracks: Single track
- Track gauge: 1,435 mm (4 ft 8 1/2 in) standard gauge
- Electrification: 3000 V DC Overhead line
Route map
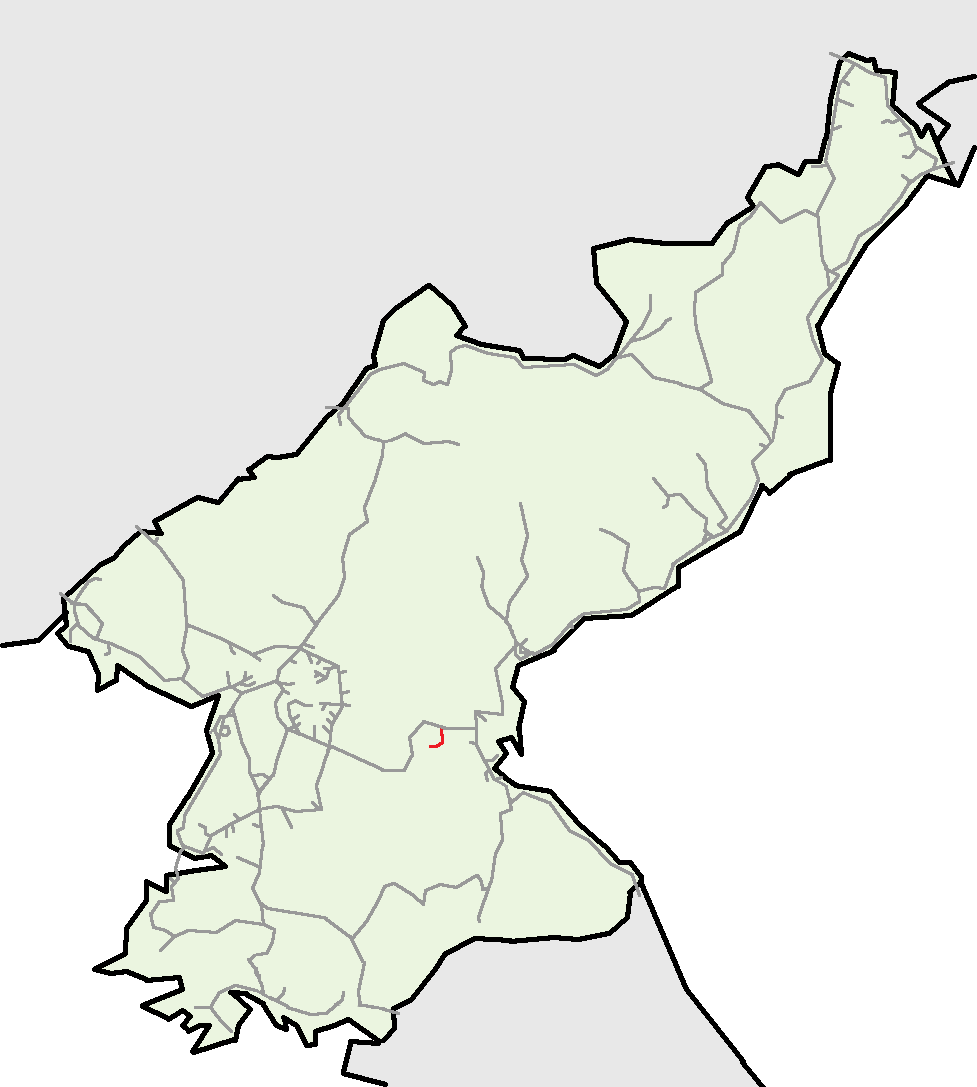

- Kowon Tangwang Line
- Chosŏn'gŭl: 고원탄광선
- Hancha: 高原炭鑛線
- Revised Romanization: Gowontangwang-seon
- McCune–Reischauer: Kowŏnt'an'gwang-sŏn

The Kowŏn T'an'gwang Line, or Kowŏn Colliery Line, is an electrified secondary line of the Korean State Railway in Sudong District, South Hamgyŏng Province, North Korea, running from Tunjŏn on the P'yŏngra Line to Changdong.

== Route ==
A yellow background in the "Distance" box indicates that section of the line is not electrified.

Distance (km)		Station Name		Former Name		
Total	S2S	Transcribed	Chosŏn'gŭl (Hanja)	Transcribed	Chosŏn'gŭl (Hanja)	Connections
0.0	0.0	Tunjŏn	둔전 (屯田)			P'yŏngra Line
7.8	7.8	Sudong	수동 (水洞)			
11.7	3.9	Tŏksa	덕사 (德寺)			
17.6	5.9	Changdong	장동 (長洞)			
