= Chollima 70 =

North Korean trolleybus

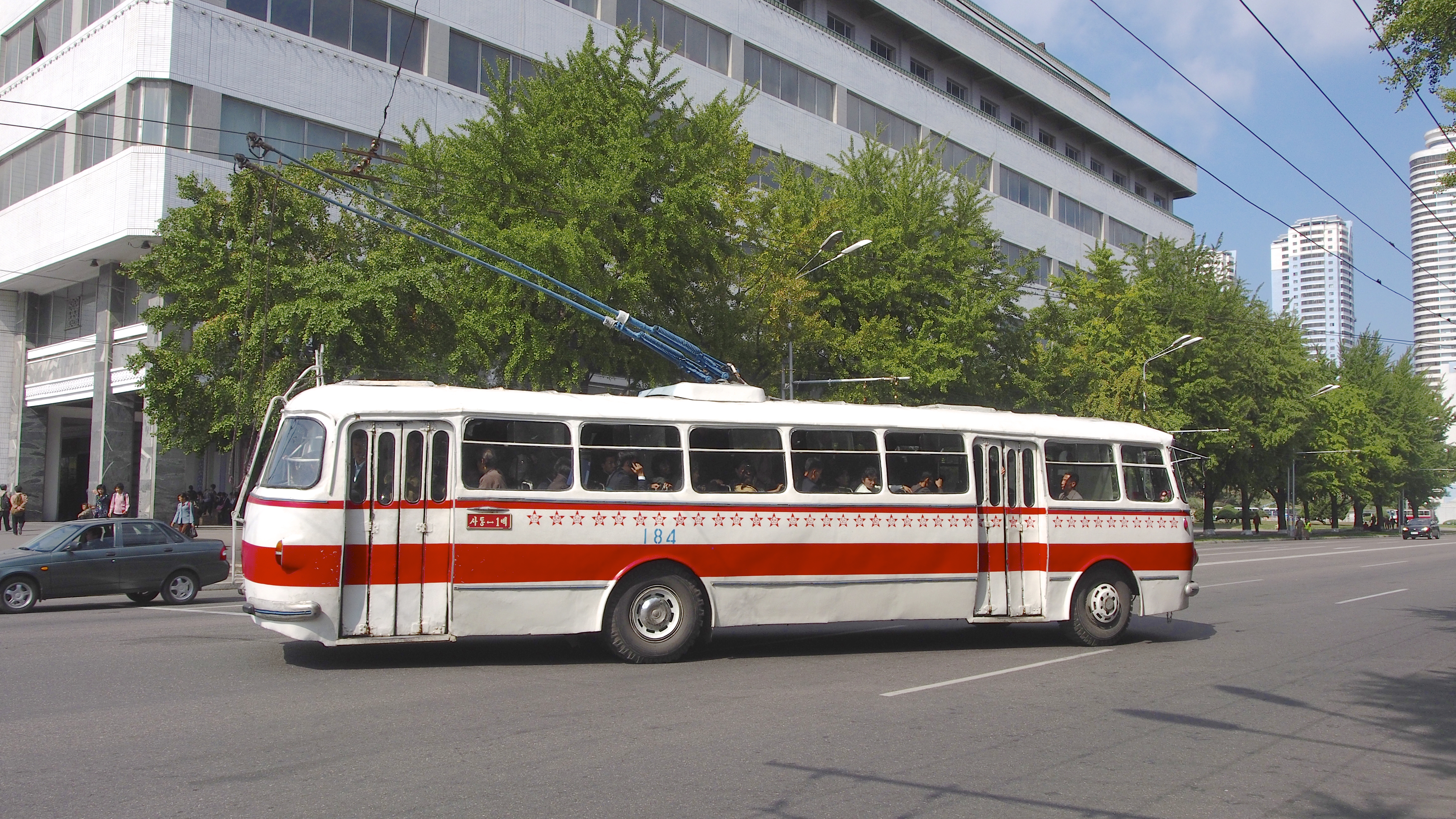
A Chonlima-70 trolleybus in Pyongyang

The Chollima 70 (also called Chonlima 70) is a two-axle trolleybus produced by Pyongyang Trolleybus Works. The trolleybus is based on the Škoda 706 RTO. There are an estimated five Chollima 70s in passenger service, mostly following the same route since the 1970s, all of which are in Pyongyang.

The trolleybuses are powered by overhead lines estimated to be at a voltage of 95 kW.

The vehicles have an estimated top speed of 45 km/h.

Trolleybuses presented to Kim Il Sung are still in passenger service as of 2015.

== Gallery ==
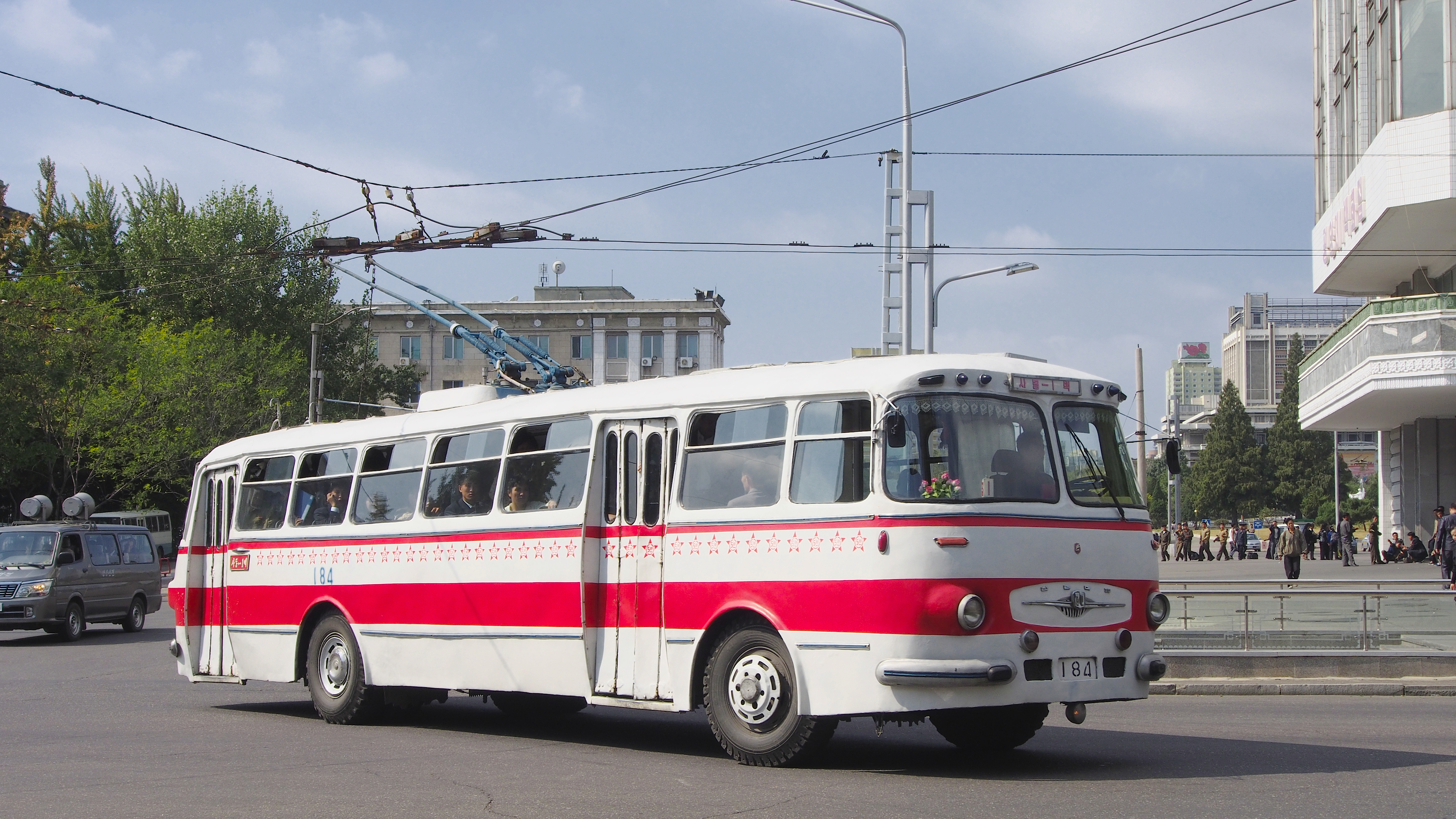
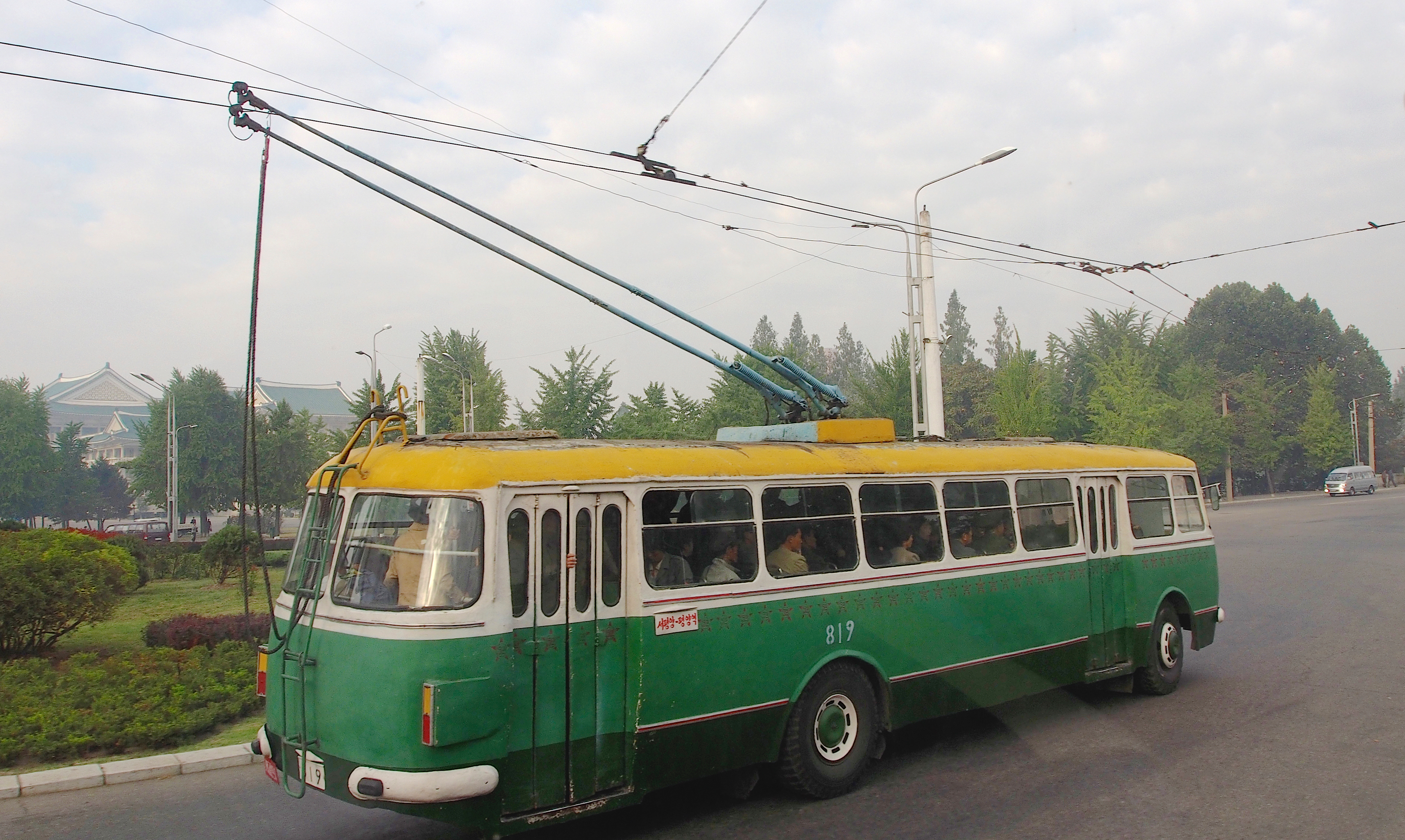
