= Chonsong Tangwang Line =

Railway line in North Korea

Ch'ŏnsŏng Colliery Line

Overview
- Native name: 천성탄광선 (天聖炭鑛線)
- Status: Operational
- Owner: Chosen Government Railway (1936–1945); Korean State Railway (since 1936)
- Locale: South P'yŏngan
- Termini: Sinch'ang; Ch'ŏnsŏng
- Stations: 3

Service
- Type: Heavy rail, Freight rail

History
- Opened: 1936

Technical
- Line length: 9.2 km (5.7 mi)
- Number of tracks: Single track
- Track gauge: 1,435 mm (4 ft 8 1/2 in) standard gauge
- Electrification: 3000 V DC Catenary

- Chonsong Tangwang Line
- Chosŏn'gŭl: 천성탄광선
- Hancha: 天聖炭鑛線
- Revised Romanization: Cheonseongtangwangseon
- McCune–Reischauer: Ch'ŏnsŏngt'an'gwangsŏn

The Ch'ŏnsŏng T'an'gwang Line, or Ch'ŏnsŏng Colliery Line is an electrified standard-gauge freight-only secondary line of the Korean State Railway in South P'yŏngan Province, North Korea, running from Sinch'ang on the P'yŏngra Line to Ch'ŏnsŏng.

== History ==
The line was originally opened by the Chosen Government Railway in 1936. After the partition of Korea, it was located entirely within the north, and it was part of the first section of line electrified by the Korean State Railway in 1946, between Yangdŏk on the P'yŏngra Line to Ch'ŏnsŏng via Sinch'ang. This electrification was destroyed during the Korean War, but in 1958 the Ch'ŏnsŏng–Sinch'ang–Kowŏn section was re-electrified.

== Route ==
A yellow background in the "Distance" box indicates that section of the line is not electrified.

Distance (km)		Station Name		Former Name		
Total	S2S	Transcribed	Chosŏn'gŭl (Hanja)	Transcribed	Chosŏn'gŭl (Hanja)	Connections
0.0	0.0	Sinch'ang	신창 (新倉)			P'yŏngra Line
7.5	7.5	Mangilli	망일리 (望日里)			
9.2	1.7	Ch'ŏnsŏng	천성 (天聖)			Ch'ŏnsŏng Ch'ŏngnyŏn Colliery
