= Sudong County =

Korean transcription(s)
  - Hangul: 수동군
  - Hanja: 水洞郡
  - Revised Romanization: Sudong-gun
  - McCune–Reischauer: Sudong kun
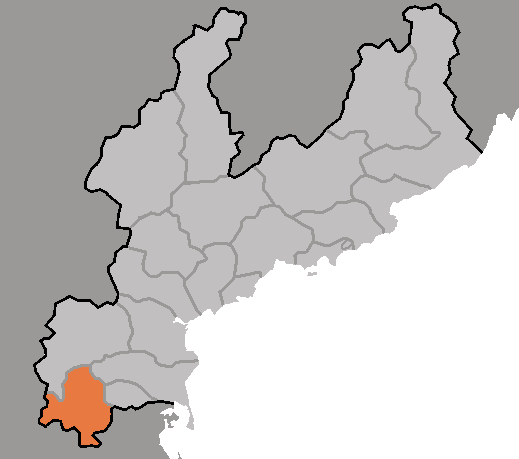
- Map of South Hamgyong showing the location of Sudong
- Country: North Korea
- Province: South Hamgyong
- Administrative divisions: 6 dong, 14 ri

Area
  - Total: 783.4 km^{2} (302.5 sq mi)

Population (2008)
  - Total: 95,716
  - Density: 122.2/km^{2} (316.4/sq mi)

Sudong County is a county in South Hamgyŏng province, North Korea. It was formed from part of Kowŏn County in December 1990.

Sudong is the site of a major coal seam first discovered in 1918. The P'yŏngra Line of the Korean State Railway passes through the district.

== Administrative divisions ==
Sudong is divided into 6 dong (neighbourhoods) and 14 ri (villages):

- Changdong-dong
- Palhŭng-dong
- Sudong-dong
- Tŏksa-dong
- Un'gok-dong
- Wŏn'gŏ-dong
- Changryang-ri
- Chukchŏl-ri
- Ch'ŏnsŏng-ri
- Ch'ŏn'ŭl-ri
- Ch'ukchŏl-ri
- Hoep'yŏng-ri
- Ryongp'yŏng-ri
- Samp'yŏng-ri
- Sangong-ri
- Sŏngnae-ri
- Sŏngnam-ri
- Susal-ri
- Unhŭng-ri
- Unsal-ri

== Transportation ==
Sudong-gu has a trolleybus line opened in 1979 running within this district, linking residential areas to Kowon mine. The line opened in 1979, with a number of second hand Chollima 9.11 trolleybuses used to serve the line initially. The line appears to no longer have any trolleybuses.

Kowon Tangwang Line runs to this district from Tunjon station, serving the colliery.

== See also ==
- Geography of North Korea
- Administrative divisions of North Korea
- South Hamgyong
