= Changsongang Line =

Railway line in North Korea

Changsŏn'gang Line

Overview
- Native name: 장선강선 (長鮮江線)
- Status: Operational
- Owner: Korean State Railway
- Locale: South P'yŏngan
- Termini: Ŭnsan; Changsŏn'gang
- Stations: 2

Service
- Type: Heavy rail, freight rail
- Operator: Korean State Railway

Technical
- Line length: 3.0 km (1.9 mi)
- Number of tracks: Single track
- Track gauge: 1,435 mm (4 ft 8 1/2 in) standard gauge

- Changsongang Line
- Hangul: 장선강선
- Hanja: 長鮮江線
- RR: Jangseongangseon
- MR: Changsŏn'gangsŏn

The Changsŏn'gang Line is a non-electrified standard-gauge freight-only secondary line of the Korean State Railway in South P'yŏngan Province, North Korea, running from Ŭnsan on the P'yŏngra Line to Changsŏn'gang.

== Route ==
A yellow background in the "Distance" box indicates that section of the line is not electrified.

Distance (km)		Station Name		Former Name		
Total	S2S	Transcribed	Chosŏn'gŭl (Hanja)	Transcribed	Chosŏn'gŭl (Hanja)	Connections
0.0	0.0	Ŭnsan	은산 (殷山)			P'yŏngra Line
~3.0	~3.0	Changsŏn'gang	장선강 (長鮮江)			
