= Pyongsong station =

Railway station in North Korea

P'yŏngsŏng 평성역 (平城驛)

General information
- Location: Yŏkchŏn-dong, P'yŏngsong-si, South P'yŏngan; North Korea
- Coordinates: 39.2438°N 125.8772°E
- Operator: Korean State Railway
- Line: P'yŏngra Line

Services
Preceding station	Korean State Railway	Following station
Paesanjŏm towards P'yŏngyang	P'yŏngra Line	Ponghak towards Rajin
Location

P'yŏngsŏng station is a railway station in Yŏkchŏn-dong, P'yŏngsong city, South P'yŏngan Province, North Korea. It is located on the P'yŏngra Line of the Korean State Railway.
