= Chiktong Tangwang Line =

Railway line in North Korea

Chiktong Colliery Line

Overview
- Other name: Chiktong T'an'gwang Line
- Native name: 직동탄광선 (直洞炭鑛線)
- Status: Operational
- Owner: Korean State Railway
- Locale: South P'yŏngan
- Termini: Taegŏn; Chiktong Colliery
- Stations: 4

Service
- Type: Heavy rail, freight rail
- Operator: Korean State Railway

Technical
- Line length: 8.5 km (5.3 mi)
- Number of tracks: Single track
- Track gauge: 1,435 mm (4 ft 8 1/2 in) standard gauge
- Electrification: 3000 V DC Overhead line

- Chiktong Tangwang Line
- Chosŏn'gŭl: 직동탄광선
- Hancha: 直洞炭鑛線
- Revised Romanization: Jikdongdan-gwang-seon
- McCune–Reischauer: Chiktongt'an'gwang-sŏn

The Chiktong T'an'gwang Line, or Chiktong Colliery Line, is an electrified standard-gauge secondary line of the Korean State Railway in South P'yŏngan Province, North Korea, running from Taegŏn Station at the junction of the Taegŏn and Ŭnsan lines to Chiktong T'an'gwang. The line serves the Pusan Aluminium Factory at Pusalli, as well as the large 8 February Chiktong Ch'ŏngnyŏn Colliery at Chiktong T'an'gwang.

== Route ==
A yellow background in the "Distance" box indicates that section of the line is not electrified.

Distance (km)		Station Name		Former Name		
Total	S2S	Transcribed	Chosŏn'gŭl (Hanja)	Transcribed	Chosŏn'gŭl (Hanja)	Connections
0.0	0.0	Taegŏn	대건 (戴建)			Taegŏn Line, Ŭnsan Line
4.7	4.7	Pusalli	부산리 (富山里)			
6.6	1.9	Puhŭng	부흥 (富興)			
8.5	1.9	Chiktong T'an'gwang	직동탄광 (直洞炭鑛)	Chiktong	직동 (直洞)	
