= Taegon Line =

Railway line in North Korea

Taegŏn Line

Overview
- Native name: 대건선(戴建線)
- Status: Operational
- Owner: Korean State Railway
- Locale: South P'yŏngan
- Termini: Taegŏn; Pongch'ang
- Stations: 9

Service
- Type: Heavy rail, freight rail
- Operator(s): Korean State Railway

Technical
- Line length: 34.5 km (21.4 mi)
- Number of tracks: Single track
- Track gauge: 1,435 mm (4 ft 8 1/2 in) standard gauge
- Electrification: 3000 V DC Overhead line
Route map
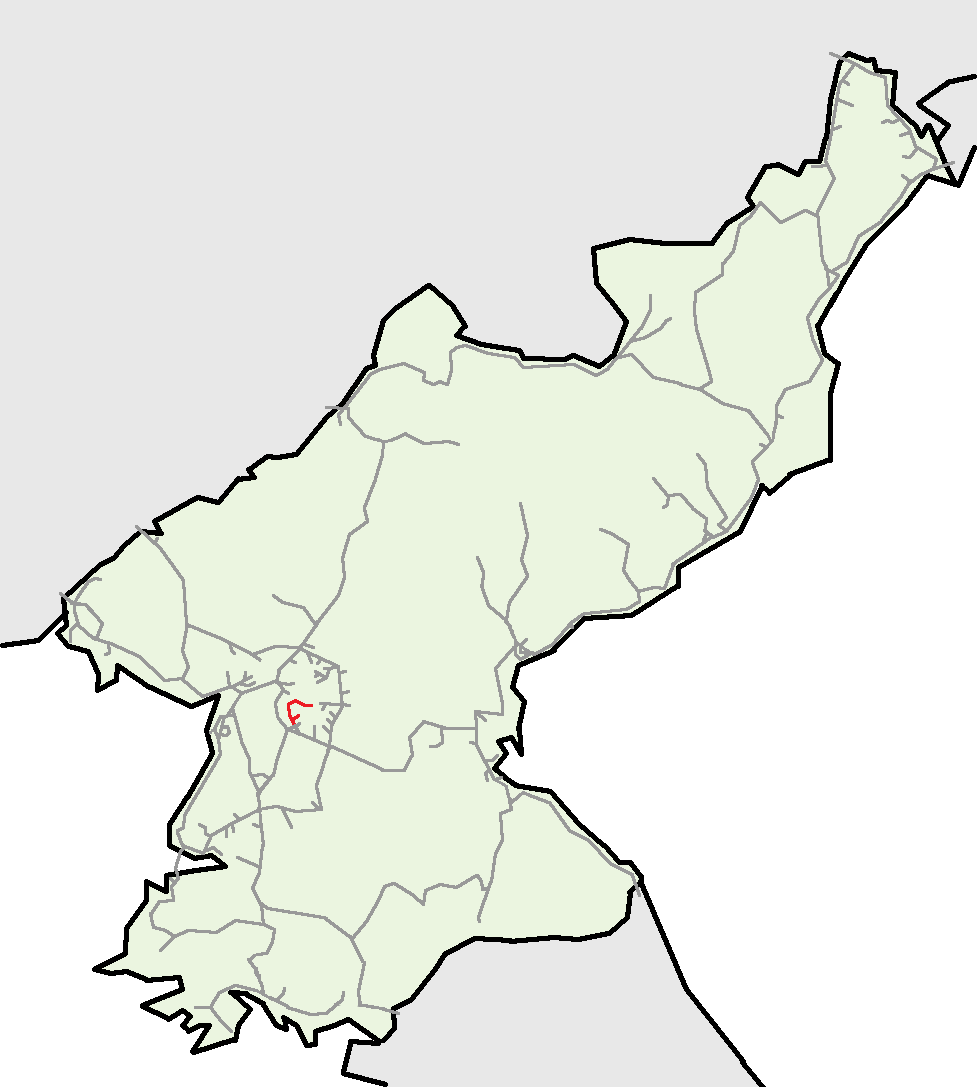

- Taegon Line
- Hangul: 대건선
- Hanja: 戴建線
- RR: Daegeonseon
- MR: Taegŏnsŏn

The Taegŏn Line is an electrified standard-gauge secondary line of the Korean State Railway in South P'yŏngan Province, North Korea. It runs from Sillyŏnp'o Station on the P'yŏngra Line via Taegŏn on the Ŭnsan Line to Pongch'ang station.

== Route ==
A yellow background in the "Distance" box indicates that section of the line is not electrified.

Distance (km)		Station Name		Former Name		
Total	S2S	Transcribed	Chosŏn'gŭl (Hanja)	Transcribed	Chosŏn'gŭl (Hanja)	Connections
0.0	0.0	Sillyŏnp'o	신련포 (新蓮浦)	Pongha	봉하 (鳳下)	P'yŏngra Line
2.1	2.1	Taegŏn	대건 (戴建)			Chiktong Colliery Line, Mohak Line, Ŭnsan Line
5.7	3.6	Chŭngsalli	증산리 (甑山里)			
8.8	3.1	Ryong'ak	룡악 (龍岳)			
15.5	6.7	Ch'op'yŏng	초평 (草坪)			
21.2	5.7	Samso	삼소 (三所)			
24.9	3.7	Mujindae	무진대 (無尽台)			
29.5	4.6	Oedong	외동 (外東)			Kaechon internment camp
34.5	5.0	Pongch'ang	봉창 (鳳倉)			Pukchang concentration camp
