= Chollima-091 =

North Korean trolleybus model

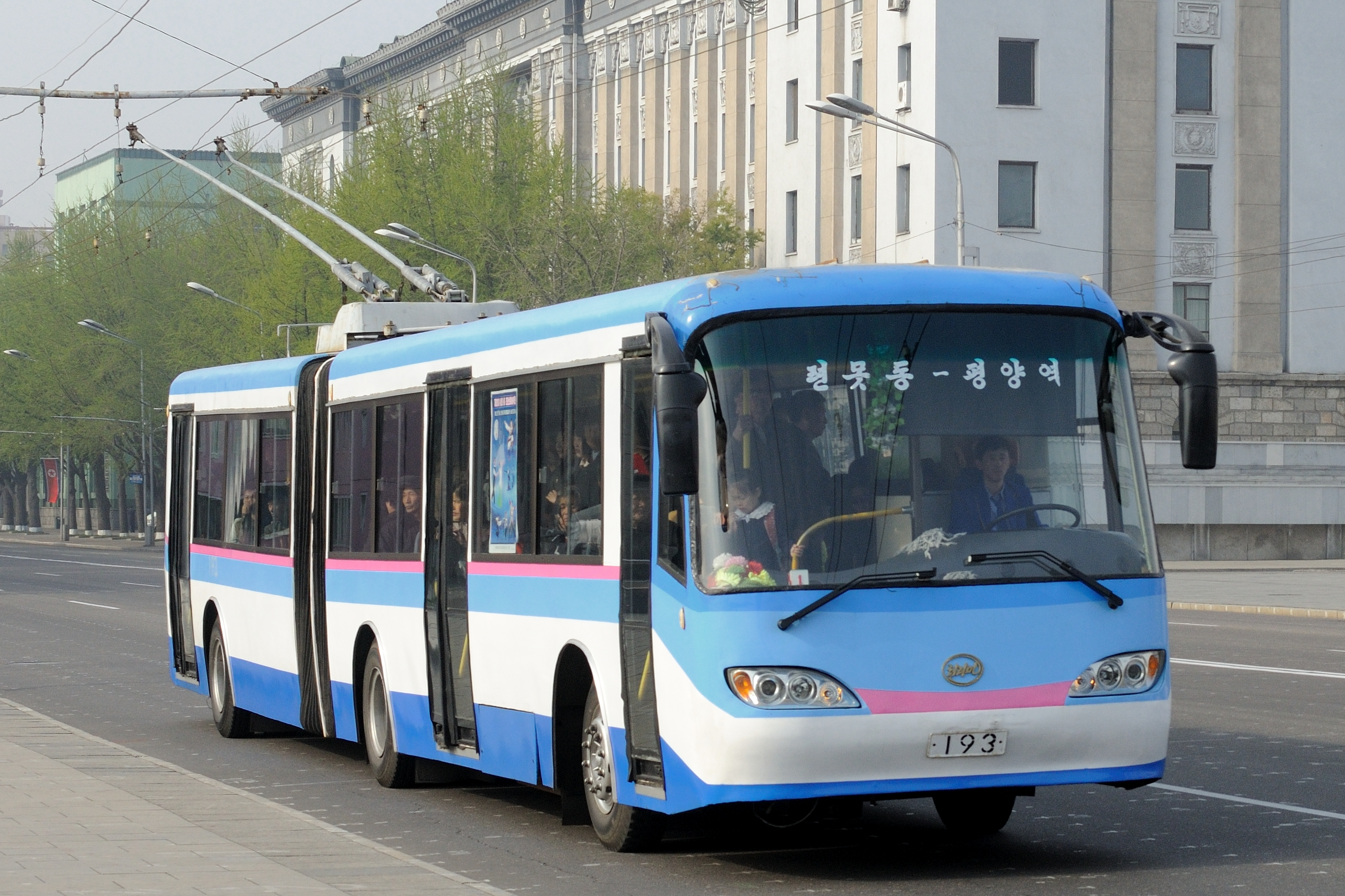
- In service: 2010–present
- Built at: Pyongyang Trolley Bus Factory
- Replaced: Chollima-90, Chollima-862, Chollima-903, Chollima-971
- Constructed: 2009–2018
- Number built: around 200
- Number in service: >177
- Fleet numbers: 103–605, numbers not allocated in sequence
- Capacity: max 180
- Depots: In service in all depots of Pyongyang

Specifications
- Car length: 17.625 metres (57.82 ft) or 16.725 metres (54.87 ft)
- Width: 2.55 metres (8.4 ft)
- Height: 3.140 metres (10.30 ft)
- Maximum speed: 86 kilometres per hour (53 mph)
- Weight: 14,700 kilograms (32,400 lb)
- Power output: 130 kW
- Electric system(s): 550-600V DC

The Chollima-091 (Korean: 천리마-091) is a high-floor, articulated trolleybus built from 2009 to 2018 by Pyongyang Trolleybus Factory for the Pyongyang trolleybus system. The name refers to the Chollima Movement which in itself derives from the mythological Chollima while the model number means year of development 2009, model 1. Since the 1960s, most of the trolleybuses in Pyongyang were named after this mythological creature. It was first produced as a prototype in 2009 and entered mass production in 2010. It is the most common vehicle in Pyongyang's trolleybus network and the vehicle with the most number in service in the DPRK.

== Design ==
Unusually, the rear door is used for loading, while passengers disembark in the other doors. There is a half door and a double door located in the front section, where the motor is housed, and one door at the rear section. These vehicles represent a design change from previous vehicles built up to the 1990s, with the passenger compartment being designed to allow as many passengers as possible. Hence, most of the seats are single seats with double seats over the wheel wells, which already occupy some space. The driver's cabin is not separate from the passenger cabin, unlike vehicles built prior to 1986.

These vehicles are not equipped with air conditioning, as it would likely consume too much electricity, which was in short supply. Instead, the vehicles have large sliding windows and fans within the cabin to ventilate the cabin. The vehicle has no insulation near the trolley poles or at the door steps. Each trolleybus is assembled manually, welding together frames; this means vehicles might have slight differences. The paint is also applied by hand with a total of 17 paint variations. Due to the handmade nature, the vehicle does not run smoothly. The articulation joint is based on the Ikarus 280, although since the design is rather primitive, it causes creaking noises in motion, with occasional jamming of the joint occurring.

The motor is a 130 kW switched reluctance motor, running at 1800 rpm. The maximum speed in service is 45 km/h. Driving axles are built by China National Heavy Duty Truck Group. The vehicle is reported to fitted with a kneeling suspension.

Compared to previous single section trolleybuses, the capacity is increased by 2.5 times and compared to older articulated buses, it is improved by 1.4 times.

== Variants ==
There are a number of variations in this vehicle. Mass production vehicles use rheostat control system, while one vehicle was fitted with an electronic control. This vehicle is also the only Chollima-091 fitted with a standard, two panel front door. Some vehicles also appear to have been fitted with alternating current motors instead.

A model with a flatter frontal section appears to have been developed in parallel with the first version and neither have appeared to supersede each other.
