= Ŭnsan Line =

Railway line in North Korea

Overview
- Native name: 은산선 (殷山線)
- Status: Operational
- Owner: Korean State Railway
- Locale: South P'yŏngan
- Termini: Ŭnsan; Taegŏn
- Stations: 3

Service
- Type: Heavy rail, freight rail

Technical
- Line length: 5.8 km (3.6 mi)
- Number of tracks: Single track
- Track gauge: 1,435 mm (4 ft 8 1/2 in) standard gauge
- Electrification: 3000 V DC Overhead line

- Ŭnsan Line
- Hangul: 은산선
- Hanja: 殷山線
- RR: Eunsanseon
- MR: Ŭnsansŏn

The Ŭnsan Line is an electrified standard-gauge freight-only secondary line of the Korean State Railway in South P'yŏngan Province, North Korea, running from Ŭnsan on the P'yŏngra Line to Taegŏn.

== Route ==
A yellow background in the "Distance" box indicates that section of the line is not electrified.

Distance (Total; km)	Distance (S2S; km)	Station Name (Transcribed)	Station Name (Chosŏn'gŭl (Hanja))	Former name (Transcribed)	Former name (Chosŏn'gŭl (Hanja))	Connections
0.0	0.0	Ŭnsan	은산 (殷山)			Changsŏn'gang Line, P'yŏngra Line
2.5	2.5	Haksan	학산 (鶴山)			Maebong Line
5.8	3.3	Taegŏn	대건 (戴建)			Chiktong Colliery Line, Mohak Line, Taegŏn Line
