= Sunchon =

Sunch'ŏn 순천시
- Municipal City

Korean transcription(s)
  - Chosŏn'gŭl: 순천시
  - Hancha: 順川市
  - McCune-Reischauer: Sunch'ŏn-si
  - Revised Romanization: Suncheon-si
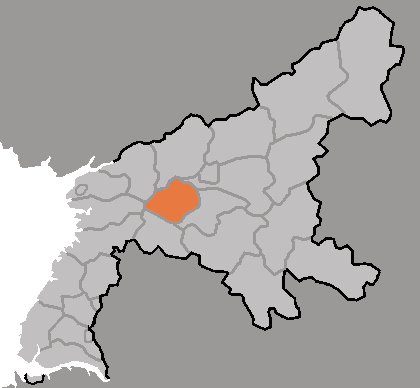
- Map of South Pyongan showing the location of Sunchon

- Location within North Korea
- Coordinates: 39°25′0″N 125°56′0″E
- Country: North Korea
- Province: South P'yŏngan
- Administrative divisions: 21 tong, 11 ri

Population (2008)
  - Total: 297,317
- Time zone: UTC+9 (Pyongyang Time)

Sunch'ŏn (Korean pronunciation: [sun.tsʰʌn]) is a city in South Pyongan province, North Korea. It has a population of 297,317, and is home to various manufacturing plants. The city is on the Taedong River.

== History ==
In 1413, the name of the city became Sunchon, due to a renaming rule in the early Joseon, where 'ju (州)' were changed to 'chon (川)' and became Sunchon-gun. The original name referred to a smooth repelling of invaders.

In 1983, the county was elevated into a city and became Sunchon-si and a number of administrative districts were reorganised. Various other administrative division changes occurred until remaining in its current form from 2003.

In December 1951, the Korean War aerial Battle of Sunch'ŏn was fought near Sunch'ŏn between the Royal Australian Air Force and two North Korean allies – China and the Soviet Union.

== Administrative divisions ==
Sunch'ŏn-si is divided into 21 tong (neighbourhoods) and 11 ri (villages):

- Chik-dong (직동)
- Chŭngsan-dong (증산동)
- Kangan-dong (강안동)
- Kangp'o-dong (강포동)
- Kŭmch'ŏn-dong (금천동)
- Kŭmsan-dong (금산동)
- Osa-dong (오사동)
- Ponghwa-dong (봉화동)
- Pong'u-dong (봉우동)
- Puhŭng-dong (부흥동)
- Ryŏnbong-dong (련봉동)
- Subok-tong (수복동)
- Sunch'ŏn-dong (순천동)
- Tongam-dong (동암동)
- Ŭngbong-dong (응봉동)
- Yŏkchŏn-dong (역전동)
- Naedang-ri (내당리)
- Obong-ri (오봉리)
- Pukch'ang-ri (북창리)
- P'ungdŏng-ri (풍덕리)
- P'yŏng-ri (평리)
- Ryongbong-ri (룡봉리)
- Sil-ri (신리)
- Sindŏng-ri (신덕리)
- Sŏnam-ri (서남리)
- Wŏnsang-ri (원상리)
- Ryŏnp'o-dong (련포동)
- Saedŏk-dong (새덕동)
- Saemaŭl-dong (새마을동)
- Sŏksu-dong (석수동)
- Ryongji-ri (룡지리)
- Ryongak-tong (룡악동)

== Economy ==
=== Electricity generation ===
The city has a thermal power station, the Sunchon Thermal Power Plant, which has an estimated installed capacity of 20 MW, although in 2009, it generated only on average 10 MW over the year. For the 80 day campaign of the 8th Congress of the Workers' Party of Korea, it was reported that the generation equipment at this power station had been overhauled and restored to its original state. A campaign was waged to keep generation capacity at the maximum.

=== Cement industry ===
Sunchon has a developed industry. The Sunchon Cement Complex has the capability to produce millions of tons of cement each year for use within North Korea but also exported to other countries. The plant has participated in major construction projects, such as the plan for 10,000 flats in Pyongyang in 2021. It has direct access to the Sunchon Limestone mine and the Sunchon Gypsum mine.

=== Chemical industry ===
The city has a Vinylon factory, and other chemical factories producing carbide, methanol and various chemical fertilisers. One of the most important pharmaceutical companies of North Korea, the Sunchon Pharmaceutical factory produces penicillin, streptomycin and rifampicin.

=== Agriculture ===
Due to a lack of an irrigation system, before liberation, Sunchon was only suitable for millets. This was extensively developed after liberation and the city now plants beans, corn, rice and barley. Various fruits and vegetables are also grown and a range of animals are raised.

== Transportation ==
Sunch'ŏn Station is on the P'yŏngra and Manp'o lines of the Korean State Railway. Taegon Line and various other industrial lines pass through the city.

The city is on multiple important roads to Pyongyang, Kanggye, Pyongsong and Hamhung.

== Culture ==
The city has various primary schools, secondary schools, vocational schools and universities. Other facilities include a library, a hospital and a sanatorium.

== Sister cities ==
- Atuntaqui, Imbabura Province, Ecuador

== See also ==
- List of cities in North Korea
- Geography of North Korea
