= Rajin station =

Railway station in Rason, North Korea

Coordinates: 42°14′59″N 130°17′21″E

Rajin 라진

Korean name
- Hangul: 라진역
- Hanja: 羅津驛
- Revised Romanization: Rajin-yeok
- McCune–Reischauer: Rajin-yŏk

General information
- Location: Rajin-guyŏk, Rasŏn-t'ŭkpyŏlsi; North Korea
- Owner: Korean State Railway

History
- Opened: 16 November 1929

Services
Preceding station	Korean State Railway	Following station
Terminus	Hambuk Line	Kwan'gok towards Ch'ŏngjin Ch'ŏngnyŏn
Myŏngho towards P'yŏngyang	P'yŏngra Line	Terminus
Terminus	Rajin Port Line	Rajinhang Terminus
Location

Rajin station is a railway station in Rajin-guyŏk, Rasŏn Special City, North Korea. It is the junction point and terminus of both the Hambuk and P'yŏngra lines of the Korean State Railway. It is also the starting point of a freight-only branchline to Rajin Port station.

== History ==
In 1935, the port at Rajin was opened as an alternative to Unggi (now called Sŏnbong); at the same time, on 1 November 1935 the South Manchuria Railway opened the Ungra Line to connect Unggi to Rajin. An express train named "Asahi" from Xinjing, Manchukuo to Rajin was put into service in 1936 to connect to the ferry to Japan. After the end of the Korean War the Ungra Line was combined with several others to create the Hambuk Line as it is today.

The construction of the Korean-Russian Friendship Bridge across the Tumen River, along with the Hongŭi Line from Tumangang to Hongŭi on the Hambuk Line in 1959 created a direct rail connection between North Korea and the Soviet Union; this, along with the extension in 1965 of the P'yŏngra Line to Rajin, meeting up with the terminus of the Hambuk Line. This turned Rajin station into one of the most important stations on the entirety of the North Korean rail network, handling vast amounts of freight traffic to and from the Soviet Union and the former Communist countries of Eastern Europe.

In 2008 work was begun to convert the line from the DPRK-Russia border to the port at Rajin to dual (standard and Russian) gauge, including the entirety of the Hongŭi Line and the Hongŭi-Rajin section of the Hambuk Line.

== Services ==
=== Freight ===
Though the amount of import-export traffic to Russia has dropped significantly since the collapse of the Soviet Union, a significant amount of freight traffic still moves through Rajin station to and from Russia. Since the completion of the modernisation of the line from the DPRK-Russia border in 1993, this traffic is expected to increase once again.

=== Passenger ===
Two pairs of passenger express trains are known to stop at Rajin station:

- Express trains 7/8, operating between P'yŏngyang and Moscow via Tumangang;
- Semi-express trains 128-129-130/131-132-133, operating between Kalma and Rajin via the P'yŏngra Line;

There is also a long-distance train between Kalma and Rajin that runs via the Hambuk Line through Ch'ŏngjin and Hoeryŏng, as well as a commuter trains 623/624 that operate between Rajin and Sŏnbong;
