= Pyongra Line =

Railway line in North Korea

P'yŏngra Line

Overview
- Native name: 평라선(平羅線)
- Owner: Korean State Railway
- Locale: P'yŏngyang; South Pyŏngan; South Hamgyŏng; North Hamgyŏng; Rasŏn
- Termini: P'yŏngyang; Rajin
- Stations: 135

Service
- Type: Heavy rail, Passenger/Freight; Inter-city rail, Regional rail
- Depot(s): P'yŏngyang, West P'yŏngyang, Hamhŭng

History
- Opened: Stages between 1916-1965

Technical
- Line length: 819 km
- Number of tracks: Single track
- Track gauge: 1,435 mm (4 ft 8 1/2 in) standard gauge
- Electrification: 3000 V DC Overhead line
Route map
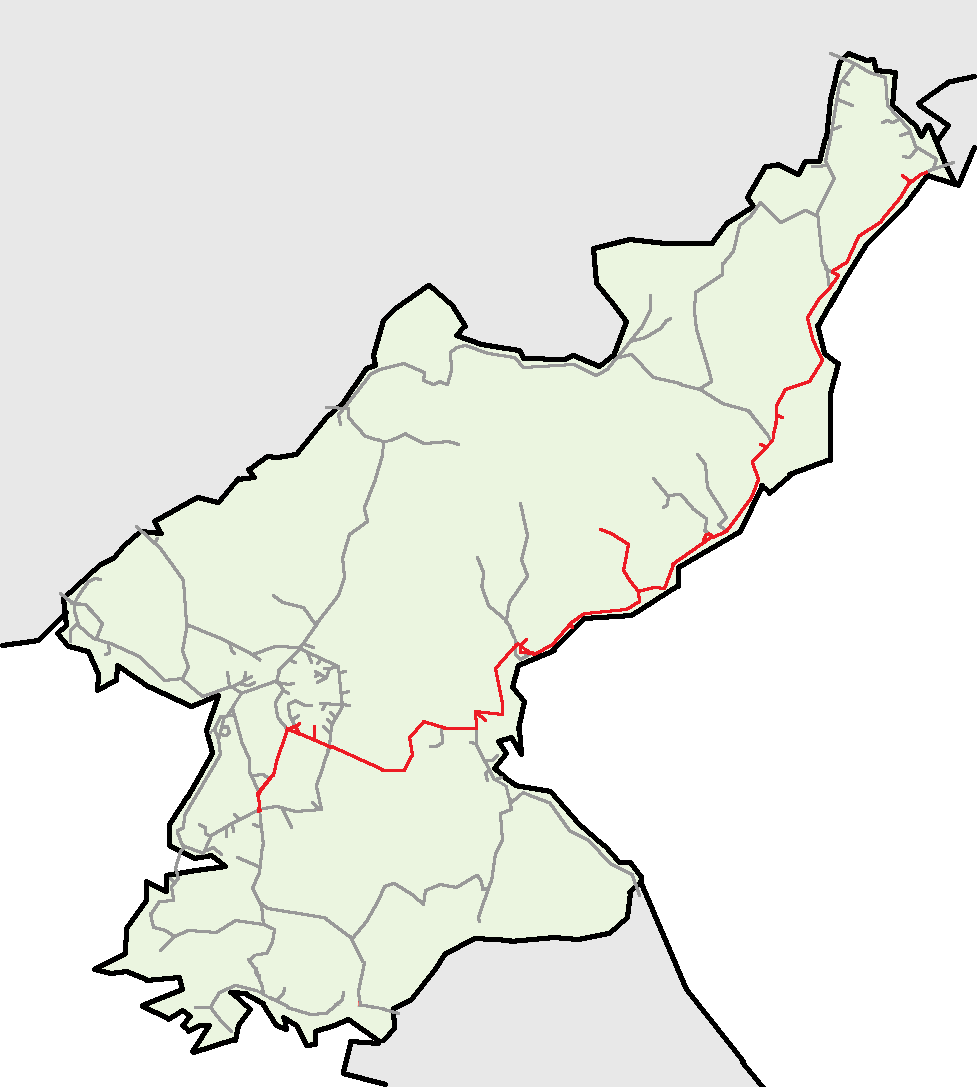

- Pyongra Line
- Hangul: 평라선
- Hanja: 平羅線
- RR: Pyeongnaseon
- MR: P'yŏngnasŏn

The P'yŏngra Line is an electrified standard-gauge trunk line of the Korean State Railway in North Korea, running from P'yŏngyang to Rason, where it connects with the Hambuk Line. It is North Korea's main northeast–southwest rail line.

== History ==
=== Hamgyŏng Line ===
The 12.4 km (7.7 mi) section from Kowŏn to Kŭmya was originally opened by the Chosen Government Railway (Sentetsu) on 21 July 1916 as part of its Hamgyŏng Line.

=== Ch'ŏngra Line ===
The Ch'ŏngra Line was the name of a line planned by Sentetsu to run from Ch'ŏngjin to Rajin. On 1 February 1945 the Ch'ongjin−Ch'ongam section was opened, however due to the defeat of Japan in the Pacific War, Sentetsu was unable to complete the remainder of the line. After the end of the Korean War, construction of the line was resumed with the support of People's Republic of China and the Soviet Union, being completed on 10 June 1965.

Later, the P'yŏngwon Line, the Ch'ŏngra Line, and the Kowŏn−Ch'ŏngjin section of the Hamgyŏng Line were merged to create the P'yŏngra Line. With the construction of a new section between Kalli and Paesanjŏm the Ryongsŏng Line was separated from the former P'yŏngwon Line; in 1993 construction of the bypass between Puraesan and Kowŏn was completed.

== Services ==
The following passenger trains were scheduled on this line in the 2002 passenger timetable:

- Express trains 1/2, operating between P'yŏngyang and Hyesan Ch'ŏngnyŏn, run on this line between P'yŏngyang and Kilju;
- Express trains 3/4, operating between West P'yŏngyang and Hyesan Ch'ŏngnyŏn, run on this line between P'yŏngyang and Kilju;
- Express trains 7/8, operating between P'yŏngyang and Tumangang and Moscow, run on this line between P'yŏngyang and Rajin;
- Express trains 9/10, operating between P'yŏngyang and Musan, run on this line between P'yŏngyang and Ch'ŏngjin;
- Express trains 11/12, operating between P'yŏngyang and Kŭmgol, run on this line between P'yŏngyang and Yŏhaejin;
- Express trains 13/14, operating between P'yŏngyang and P'yŏnggang, run on this line between P'yŏngyang and Kowŏn;
- Semi-express trains 104-107/108-111, operating between Haeju Ch'ŏngnyŏn and Manp'o Ch'ŏngnyŏn, run on this line between P'yŏngyang and Sunch'ŏn;
- Semi-express trains 113/114, operating between West P'yŏngyang and Unsŏng, run on this line between West P'yŏngyang and Ch'ŏngjin;
- Semi-express trains 117/118, operating between Taedonggang and P'yŏnggang, run on this line between Sinsŏngch'ŏn and Kowŏn;
- Semi-express trains 119-122/120-121, operating between Sinch'ŏn and Ch'ŏngjin Ch'ŏngnyŏn, via the P'yŏngra Line and the Ŭnnyul Line, run on this line between P'yŏngyang and Ch'ŏngjin and taking three days to travel each way;
- Semi-express trains 124-125/126-127, operating between Sinŭiju Ch'ŏngnyŏn and Ch'ŏngjin Ch'ŏngnyŏn, run on this line between P'yŏngyang and Ch'ŏngjin;
- Semi-express trains 128-129-130/131-132-133, operating between Kalma and Rajin, run on this line between Kowŏn and Rajin;
- Semi-express trains 134-135/136-137, operating between Manp'o Ch'ŏngnyŏn and Hamhŭng, run on this line between Sunch'ŏn and Hamhŭng;
- Regional trains 202-203-204/205-206-207, operating between Hamhŭng and Sariwŏn, run on this line between Hamhŭng and P'yŏngyang;
- Regional trains 261/262, operating between Hamhŭng and Samgi, run on this line between Ham and Sinbukch'ŏn;
- Regional trains 263/264 operate between Hamhŭng and Tanch'ŏn Ch'ŏngnyŏn;
- Local trains 311/312 and 313/314 operate between P'yŏngyang and Paesanjŏm - these trains, intended for commuter use by scientists, are operated with the Juche-class EMU;
- Local trains 331/332 operate between Sunch'ŏn and Ŭnsan;
- Local trains 335/336 operate between Sunch'ŏn and Ch'ŏnsŏng on the Ch'ŏnsŏng Colliery Line via Sinch'ang;
- Local trains 551/556, operating between Kokku and Tongdae, run on this line between Kokku and Tanch'ŏn;
- Local trains 601/604, operating between Ch'ŏngjin Ch'ŏngnyŏn and Kŭndong, run on this line between Ch'ŏngjin and Namgangdŏk;
- Local trains 602/615 operate between Ch'ŏngjin Ch'ŏngnyŏn and Ranam;
- Local trains 603/603-621 operate between Ranam and Sŏngp'yŏng;
- Local trains 608/608-609, operating between Kŭndong and Sŏngp'yŏng, run on this line between Namgangdŏk and Sŏngp'yŏng.

== Route ==
A yellow background in the "Distance" box indicates that section of the line is not electrified.

Distance (km)								
Present		Original		Station Name		Former Name		
Total	S2S	Total	S2S	Transcribed	Chosŏn'gŭl (Hanja)	Transcribed	Chosŏn'gŭl (Hanja)	Connections (former)
-19.1	0.0	0.0	0.0	P'yŏngyang	평양 (平壤)			P'yŏngbu Line, P'yŏngnam Line, P'yŏngdŏk Line, P'yŏngŭi Line ●Ch'ŏllima Line Yŏnggwang Stn ● Tram Line 1
-14.4	4.7	4.7	4.7	Sŏp'yŏngyang (West P'yŏngyang)	서평양 (西平壤)			P'yŏngŭi Line ● Tram Line 3
-8.0	6.4	11.1	6.4	Sŏp'o	서포 (西浦)			P'yŏngŭi Line, Ryongsŏng Line ●Ch'ŏllima Line Sŏp'o Stn (planned)
--	--	17.1	6.0	Ryongsŏng	룡성 (龍城)	Yongsŏng	용성 (龍城)	Now part of Ryongsŏng Line
0.0	8.0	--	--	Kalli	간리 (間里)			P'yŏngŭi Line, Sijŏng Line
8.2	8.2	--	--	Chung'i	중이 (中二)			
--	--	24.2	7.1	Saedong	새동 (-)	Maram	마람 (馬嵐)	Now part of Ryongsŏng Line
15.3	7.1	26.4	2.2	Tongbungri	동북리 (東北里)			Ryongsŏng Line
20.5	5.2	31.6	5.2	Paesanjŏm	배산점 (裵山店)			
25.0	4.5	36.1	4.5	P'yŏngsŏng	평성 (平城)	Sainjang	사인장 (舍人場)	
31.3	6.3	42.4	6.3	Ponghak	봉학 (鳳鶴)			Ponghak Line
39.0	7.7	50.1	7.7	Chasan	자산 (慈山)			
47.3	8.3	58.4	8.3	Sunch'ŏn	순천 (順川)			Manp'o Line
50.8	3.5	61.9	3.5	Sillyŏnp'o	신련포 (新蓮浦)	Pongha	봉하 (鳳下)	Taegŏn Line
56.8	6.0	67.9	6.0	Ŭnsan	은산 (殷山)			Changsŏn'gang Line, Ŭnsan Line
61.4	4.6	72.5	4.6	Suyang	수양 (首陽)			
67.0	5.6	78.1	5.6	Sinch'ang	신창 (新倉)			Ch'ŏnsŏng Colliery Line
75.5	8.5	86.6	8.5	Sudŏk	수덕 (修德)			
83.7	8.2	94.8	8.2	Sinsŏngch'ŏn	신성천 (新成川)			P'yŏngdŏk Line
91.8	8.1	102.9	8.1	Kŏhŭng	거흥 (巨興)			
96.5	4.7	107.6	4.7	Changrim	장림 (長林)			
104.5	8.0	115.6	8.0	Sinyang	신양 (新陽)	Tongwŏn	동원 (東元)	
108.9	4.4	120.0	4.4	Inp'yŏng	인평 (仁平)			
115.9	7.0	127.0	7.0	Chisu	지수 (智水)			
123.9	8.0	135.0	8.0	Yangdŏk	양덕 (陽德)			
131.7	7.8	142.8	7.8	Naedong	내동 (內洞)			
137.3	5.6	148.4	5.6	Sŏkt'ang Onch'ŏn	석탕온천 (石湯溫泉)			
145.8	8.5	156.9	8.5	Kŏch'a	거차 (巨次)			
151.8	6.0	162.9	6.0	Ch'ŏn'ŭl	천을 (天乙)			
158.1	6.3	169.2	6.3	Un'gok	운곡 (雲谷)			
163.3	5.2	174.4	5.2	Yodŏk	요덕 (耀德)	Kwanp'yŏng	관평 (館坪)	
169.3	6.0	180.4	6.0	T'oryŏng	토령 (土嶺)			
174.6	5.3	185.7	5.3	Munp'il	문필 (文筆)	Ch'ŏnsŏng	천성 (泉城)	
182.6	8.0	193.7	8.0	Sŏngnae	성내 (城內)			
186.3	3.7	197.4	3.7	Tunjŏn	둔전 (屯田)			Kowŏn Colliery Line
188.2	1.9	199.3	1.9	P'alhŭng	팔흥 (八興)	Inhŭng	인흥 (仁興)	
192.9	4.7	204.0	4.7	Ch'ukchŏn	축전 (杻田)			
198.0	5.1	209.1	5.1	Midun	미둔 (彌屯)			
201.3	3.3	212.4	3.3	Panghwa	방화 (傍花)			
205.9	4.6	217.0	4.6	Puraesan	부래산 (浮來山)			
212.6	6.7	223.7; 42.0	6.7; 42.0	Kowŏn	고원 (高原)			Kangwŏn Line; Former division point between P'yŏngwŏn Line and Hamgyŏng Line. Original distsance from Wŏnsan.
217.6	5.0	47.0	5.0	Hyŏnhŭng	현흥 (玄興)			
225.0	7.4	54.4	7.4	Kŭmya	금야 (金野)	Yŏnghŭng	영흥 (永興)	Kŭmya Line
233.4	8.4	62.8	8.4	Inhŭng	인흥 (仁興)	Majang	마장 (馬場)	
240.7	7.3	70.1	7.3	Pŏmp'o	범포 (范浦)			
248.3	7.6	77.7	7.6	Wangjang	왕장 (旺場)			
252.7	4.4	82.5	4.8	Munbong	문봉 (文峰)			
257.6	4.9	87.0	6.5	Sinsang	신상 (新上)			
264.4	6.8	93.8	6.8	Pup'yŏng	부평 (富坪)			
274.1	9.7	103.5	9.7	Chŏngp'yŏng	정평 (定平)			
282.3	8.2	111.7	8.2	Hamju	함주 (咸州)	Hamnam Hŭngsang	함남흥상 (咸南興上)	
288.2	5.9	↓	↓	Chusŏ	주서 (州西)			
294.5	6.3	123.9	12.2	Hamhŭng	함흥 (咸興)			Sinhŭng Line, Sŏho Line
298.4	3.9	↓	↓	Hamhŭng Choch'ajang (Hamhŭng Marshalling Yard)	함흥조차장 (咸興操車場)			Pinallon Line
303.3	4.9	132.7	8.8	Ch'anghŭng	창흥 (昌興)	Pon'gung	본궁 (本宮)	Ch'anghŭng Line
309.9	6.6	139.3	6.6	Hŭngnam	흥남 (興南)			Pinallon Line
312.5	2.6	141.9	2.6	Sŏho	서호 (西湖)	Sŏhojin	서호진 (西湖津)	Sŏho Line
317.0	4.5	146.4	4.5	Majŏn	마전 (麻田)			
321.9	4.9	↓	↓	Sinjung	신중 (新中)			
326.7	4.8	156.1	9.7	Ryŏho	려호 (呂湖)	Yŏho	여호 (呂湖)	
330.9	4.2	160.3	4.2	Ragwŏn	락원 (樂園)	T'oejo	퇴조 (退潮)	
336.2	5.3	165.6	5.3	Sep'ori	세포리 (細浦里)			
344.0	7.8	173.4	7.8	Samho	삼호 (三湖)			
352.1	8.1	181.5	8.1	Ryong'un	룡운 (龍雲)	Yong'un	용운 (龍雲)	
357.1	5.0	186.5	5.0	Hongwŏn	홍원 (洪原)	Chŏnjin	전진 (前津)	
363.1	6.0	192.5	6.0	Kyŏngp'o	경포 (景浦)			
370.5	7.4	199.9	7.4	Unp'o	운포 (雲浦)			
↓	↓	203.5	3.6	Chungho	중호 (中湖)			Closed
376.4	5.9	205.8	2.3	P'ung'ŏ	풍어 (豊漁)	Yŏngmu	영무 (靈武)	
378.7	2.3	↓	↓	Ryuktaedong	륙대동 (六坮洞)			
382.9	4.2	212.3	6.5	Sinp'o	신포 (新浦)			
388.9	6.0	218.3	6.0	Yanghwa	양화 (陽化)			
396.0	7.1	225.4	7.1	Kangsangri	강상리 (江上里)			
403.0	7.0	232.4	7.0	Sokhu	속후 (俗厚)			
407.8	4.8	↓	↓	Yangji	양지 (陽地)			
411.9	4.1	241.3	8.9	Sinbukch'ŏng	신북청 (新北靑)			Tŏksŏng Line
417.3	5.4	246.7	5.4	Kyŏngan	경안 (景安)	Sinch'ang	신창 (新昌)	
425.5	8.2	254.9	8.2	Kŏsan	거산 (居山)			
430.6	5.1	260.0	5.1	Kŏnja	건자 (乾自)			
434.4	3.8	263.8	3.8	Rahŭng	라흥 (羅興)	Nahŭng	나흥 (羅興)	Riwŏn Line
437.7	3.3	267.1	3.3	Chŭngsan	증산 (曾山)			Riwŏn Line
444.5	6.8	273.9	6.8	Yŏmbun	염분 (鹽盆)			
447.9	3.4	277.3	3.4	Songdan	송단 (松端)	Iwŏn	이원 (利原)	
451.6	3.7	281.0	3.7	Riwŏn	리원 (利原)	Kunsŏn	군선 (群仙)	
457.0	5.4	286.4	5.4	Ssangam	쌍암 (雙岩)			
462.0	5.0	291.4	5.0	Kokku	곡구 (谷口)			
466.9	4.9	296.3	4.9	Kiam	기암 (奇岩)			
472.8	5.9	302.2	5.9	Sindanch'ŏn	신단천 (新端川)	Yonggang	용강 (龍崗)	
478.4	5.6	307.8	5.6	Omongri	오몽리 (吾夢里)			Tuŏn Line
483.1	4.7	312.5	4.7	Tanch'ŏn Ch'ŏngnyŏn	단천청년 (端川靑年)	Tanch'ŏn	단천 (端川)	Hŏch'ŏn Line
488.0	4.9	↓	↓	Munam	문암 (門岩)			
491.7	3.7	321.1	8.6	Yŏhaejin	여해진 (汝海津)			Tuŏn Line, Kŭmgol Line
498.9	7.2	328.3	7.2	Ryongdae	룡대 (龍臺)	Yongdae	용대 (龍臺)	
505.7	6.8	335.1	6.8	Ilsin	일신 (日新)			
513.4	7.7	342.8	7.7	Manch'un	만춘 (晩春)			
519.1	5.7	348.5	5.7	Ssangryong	쌍룡 (雙龍)			
525.5	6.4	354.9	6.4	Kimch'aek	김책 (金策)	Sŏngjin	성진 (城津)	
531.8	6.3	361.2	6.3	Changp'yŏng	장평 (長坪)	Sinsŏngjin	신성진 (新城津)	
534.5	2.7	363.9	2.7	Haksŏng	학성 (鶴城)	Nongsŏng	농성 (農城)	
538.9	4.4	368.3	4.4	Songsang	송상 (松上)	Hakchung	학중 (鶴中)	
546.3	7.4	375.7	7.4	Ŏbŏk	업억 (業億)			
552.2	5.9	381.6	5.9	Wŏnp'yŏng	원평 (院坪)			
562.2	10.0	389.6	8.0	Rodong	로동 (蘆洞)	Nodong	노동 (蘆洞)	Ilt'an Line; Station relocated.
567.8	5.6	397.2	7.6	Kilju Ch'ŏngnyŏn	길주청년 (吉州靑年)	Kilju	길주 (吉州)	Paektusan Ch'ŏngnyŏn Line
575.3	7.5	404.8	7.6	Kŭmsong	금송 (金松)			
579.4	4.1	408.8	4.0	Onsup'yŏng	온수평 (温水坪)			
585.5	6.1	414.9	6.1	Myŏngch'ŏn	명천 (明川)	Koch'am	고참 (古站)	Koch'am Colliery Line
594.2	8.7	423.6	8.7	Naep'o	내포 (內浦)			
598.7	4.5	428.1	4.5	Ryongban	룡반 (龍蟠)	Myŏngch'ŏn	명천 (明川)	
602.7	4.0	432.1	4.0	Sangryongjŏn	상룡전 (上龍田)			
607.2	4.5	436.6	4.5	Ryongdong	룡동 (龍洞)	Yongdong	용동 (龍洞)	
612.0	4.8	441.4	4.8	Samhyang	삼향 (三鄕)	Yŏngan	영안 (永安)	
615.3	3.3	444.7	3.3	Kŭktong	극동 (極洞)			
621.8	6.5	451.2	6.5	Chomaksan	조막산 (造幕山)			
632.6	10.8	462.0	10.8	Ponggang	봉강 (鳳岡)			
641.4	8.8	470.8	8.8	Ŏdaejin	어대진 (漁大津)			
650.7	9.3	480.1	9.3	Ŏrang	어랑 (漁郞)	Hoemun	회문 (會文)	
660.3	9.6	489.7	9.6	Ryonghyŏn	룡현 (龍峴)	Yonghyŏn	용현 (龍峴)	Taehyang Line
667.5	7.2	496.9	7.2	Kyŏngsŏng	경성 (鏡城)	Chuŭl	주을 (朱乙)	
672.1	4.6	501.5	4.6	Saenggiryŏng	생기령 (生気嶺)			
680.2	8.1	509.6	8.1	Sŭngam	승암 (勝岩)	Kyŏngsŏng	경성 (鏡城)	
688.5	8.3	517.9	8.3	Ranam	라남 (羅南)	Nanam	나남 (羅南)	
694.4	5.9	↓	↓	Namgangdŏk	남강덕 (南康德)			Kangdŏk Line
696.5	2.1	525.9	8.0	Songp'yŏng	송평 (松坪)	Ch'ŏngjinsŏhang (Ch'ŏngjin West Port)	청진서항 (淸津西港)	
698.9	2.4	528.3	2.4	Sunam	수남 (水南)	Ch'ŏngjinŏhang (Ch'ŏngjin Fishing Port)	청진어항 (淸津漁港)	
701.6	2.7	531.0; 0.0	2.7; 0.0	Ch'ŏngjin Ch'ŏngnyŏn	청진청년 (淸津靑年)	Ch'ŏngjin	청진 (淸津)	Ch'ŏngjinhang Line; Former division point between Hamgyŏng Line and Ch'ŏngra Line
704.7	3.1	3.1	3.1	Ch'ŏng'am	청암 (靑岩)			Hambuk Line
712.6	7.9	11.0	7.9	Kŭmbawi	금바위 (-)	Ch'ŏngam	청암 (靑岩)	
718.7	6.1	17.1	6.1	Sŭngwŏn	승원 (勝院)			
725.2	6.5	23.6	6.5	Ryŏnjin	련진 (連津)			
734.7	9.5	33.1	9.5	Sagu	사구 (沙口)			
738.6	3.9	37.0	3.9	Pugŏ	부거 (富居)			
748.2	9.6	46.6	9.6	Samhae	삼해 (三海)			
754.2	6.0	52.6	6.0	Kwanghae	관해 (觀海)			
761.6	7.4	60.0	7.4	Raksan	락산 (洛山)			
767.2	5.6	65.6	5.6	Pangjin	방진 (方津)			
771.2	4.0	69.6	4.0	Huch'ang	후창 (厚倉)			
776.0	4.8	74.4	4.8	Myŏngho	명호 (明湖)			
782.8	6.8	81.2	6.8	Rajin	라진 (羅津)			Hambuk Line, Rajinhang Line
