= Sinsong Line =

Railway line in North Korea

Sinsŏng Line

Overview
- Native name: 신성선 (新城線)
- Status: Operational
- Owner: Korean State Railway
- Locale: Tŏkch'ŏn-si, South P'yŏngan
- Termini: Sŏdŏkch'ŏn; Sinsŏng
- Stations: 2

Service
- Type: Heavy rail, Freight rail
- Operator(s): Korean State Railway

Technical
- Line length: 4.0 km (2.5 mi)
- Number of tracks: Single track
- Track gauge: 1,435 mm (4 ft 8 1/2 in) standard gauge
- Electrification: 3000 V DC Catenary

- Sinsong Line
- Hangul: 신성선
- Hanja: 新城線
- RR: Sinseongseon
- MR: Sinsŏngsŏn

The Sinsŏng Line is an electrified railway line of the Korean State Railway in Tŏkch'ŏn-si, South P'yŏngan Province, North Korea, running from West Tŏkch'ŏn on the Sŏch'ang Line to Sinsŏng.

== Route ==
A yellow background in the "Distance" box indicates that section of the line is not electrified.

Distance (km)		Station Name		Former Name		
Total	S2S	Transcribed	Chosŏn'gŭl (Hanja)	Transcribed	Chosŏn'gŭl (Hanja)	Connections
0.0	0.0	West Tŏkch'ŏn (Sŏdŏkch'ŏn)	서덕천 (西德川)			Sŏch'ang Line
4.0	4.0	Sinsŏng	신성 (新城)			
