= Transport in Korea =

Transport in Korea can refer to:

- Transport in South Korea
- Transport in North Korea
