= Korean automobile industry =

Korean automobile industry can refer to any of the following:

- Automotive industry in South Korea
- Automotive industry in North Korea
