= Sochang Line =

Railway line in North Korea

Sŏch'ang Line

Overview
- Native name: 서창선 (西倉線)
- Status: Operational
- Owner: Korean State Railway
- Locale: Tŏkch'ŏn-si, South P'yŏngan
- Termini: Tŏkch'ŏn; Sŏch'ang
- Stations: 4

Service
- Type: Heavy rail, Freight rail
- Operator(s): Korean State Railway

Technical
- Line length: 11.6 km (7.2 mi)
- Number of tracks: Single track
- Track gauge: 1,435 mm (4 ft 8 1/2 in) standard gauge
- Electrification: 3000 V DC Catenary

- Sochang Line
- Hangul: 서창선
- Hanja: 西倉線
- RR: Seochangseon
- MR: Sŏch'angsŏn

The Sŏch'ang Line is an electrified railway line of the Korean State Railway in Tŏkch'ŏn-si, South P'yŏngan Province, North Korea, running from Tŏkch'ŏn on the P'yŏngdŏk Line to Sŏch'ang. It connects to the Sinsŏng Line at West Tŏkch'ŏn, whilst the Hoedun Line and the Hyŏngbong Line connect at Ch'ŏlgisan.

== Services ==
Local passenger trains 723/724 operate between Tŏkch'ŏn on the P'yŏngdŏk Line and Hyŏngbong on the Hyŏngbong Line via Sŏch'ang Line, stopping at West Tŏkch'ŏn and Ch'ŏlgisan on this line.

== Route ==
A yellow background in the "Distance" box indicates that section of the line is not electrified.

Distance (km)		Station Name		Former Name		
Total	S2S	Transcribed	Chosŏn'gŭl (Hanja)	Transcribed	Chosŏn'gŭl (Hanja)	Connections
0.0	0.0	Tŏkch'ŏn	덕천 (德川)			P'yŏngdŏk Line
3.6	3.6	West Tŏkch'ŏn (Sŏdŏkch'ŏn)	서덕천 (西德川)			Sinsŏng Line
8.7	5.1	Ch'ŏlgisan	철기산 (鐵騎山)			Hoedun Line, Hyŏngbong Line
11.6	2.9	Sŏch'ang	서창 (西倉)			
