= Hoedun Line =

Railway line in North Korea

Overview
- Native name: 회둔선 (檜屯線)
- Status: Operational
- Owner: Korean State Railway
- Locale: Tŏkch'ŏn-si, South P'yŏngan
- Termini: Ch'ŏlgisan; Hoedun
- Stations: 2

Service
- Type: Heavy rail, Freight rail
- Operator(s): Korean State Railway

Technical
- Line length: 5.6 km (3.5 mi)
- Number of tracks: Single track
- Track gauge: 1,435 mm (4 ft 8 1/2 in) standard gauge
- Electrification: 3000 V DC Catenary

- Hoedun Line
- Hangul: 회둔선
- Hanja: 檜屯線
- RR: Hoedunseon
- MR: Hoedunsŏn

The Hoedun Line is an electrified railway line of the Korean State Railway in Tŏkch'ŏn-si, South P'yŏngan Province, North Korea, running from Ch'ŏlgisan on the Sŏch'ang Line to Hoedun.

== Route ==
A yellow background in the "Distance" box indicates that section of the line is not electrified.

Distance (km)		Station Name		Former Name		
Total	S2S	Transcribed	Chosŏn'gŭl (Hanja)	Transcribed	Chosŏn'gŭl (Hanja)	Connections
0.0	0.0	Ch'ŏlgisan	철기산 (鐵騎山)			Hyŏngbong Line, Sŏch'ang Line
5.6	5.6	Hoedun	회둔 (新城)			
