= Hyongbong Line =

Railway line in North Korea

Hyŏngbong Line

Overview
- Native name: 형봉선 (亨鳳線)
- Status: Operational
- Owner: Korean State Railway
- Locale: Tŏkch'ŏn-si, South P'yŏngan
- Termini: Ch'ŏlgisan; Hyŏngbong
- Stations: 2

Service
- Type: Heavy rail, Freight rail
- Operator(s): Korean State Railway

Technical
- Line length: 4.2 km (2.6 mi)
- Number of tracks: Single track
- Track gauge: 1,435 mm (4 ft 8 1/2 in) standard gauge
- Electrification: 3000 V DC Catenary

- Hyongbong Line
- Hangul: 형봉선
- Hanja: 亨鳳線
- RR: Hyeongbongseon
- MR: Hyŏngbongsŏn

The Hyŏngbong Line is an electrified railway line of the Korean State Railway in Tŏkch'ŏn-si, South P'yŏngan Province, North Korea, running from Ch'ŏlgisan on the Sŏch'ang Line to Hyŏngbong.

== Services ==
Local passenger trains 723/724 operate between Tŏkch'ŏn on the P'yŏngdŏk Line and Hyŏngbong via the Sŏch'ang Line.

== Route ==
A yellow background in the "Distance" box indicates that section of the line is not electrified.

| Distance (km) | | Station Name | | Former Name | | |
| Total | S2S | Transcribed | Chosŏn'gŭl (Hanja) | Transcribed | Chosŏn'gŭl (Hanja) | Connections |
|---|---|---|---|---|---|---|
| 0.0 | 0.0 | Ch'ŏlgisan | 철기산 (鐵騎山) | | | Hoedun Line, Sŏch'ang Line |
| 4.2 | 4.2 | Hyŏngbong | 형봉 (亨鳳) | | | |
