= Automotive industry in Korea =

Automotive industry in Korea may refer to:

- Automotive industry in North Korea
- Automotive industry in South Korea
