= Vehicle registration plates of North Korea =

Democratic People's Republic of Korea Republic
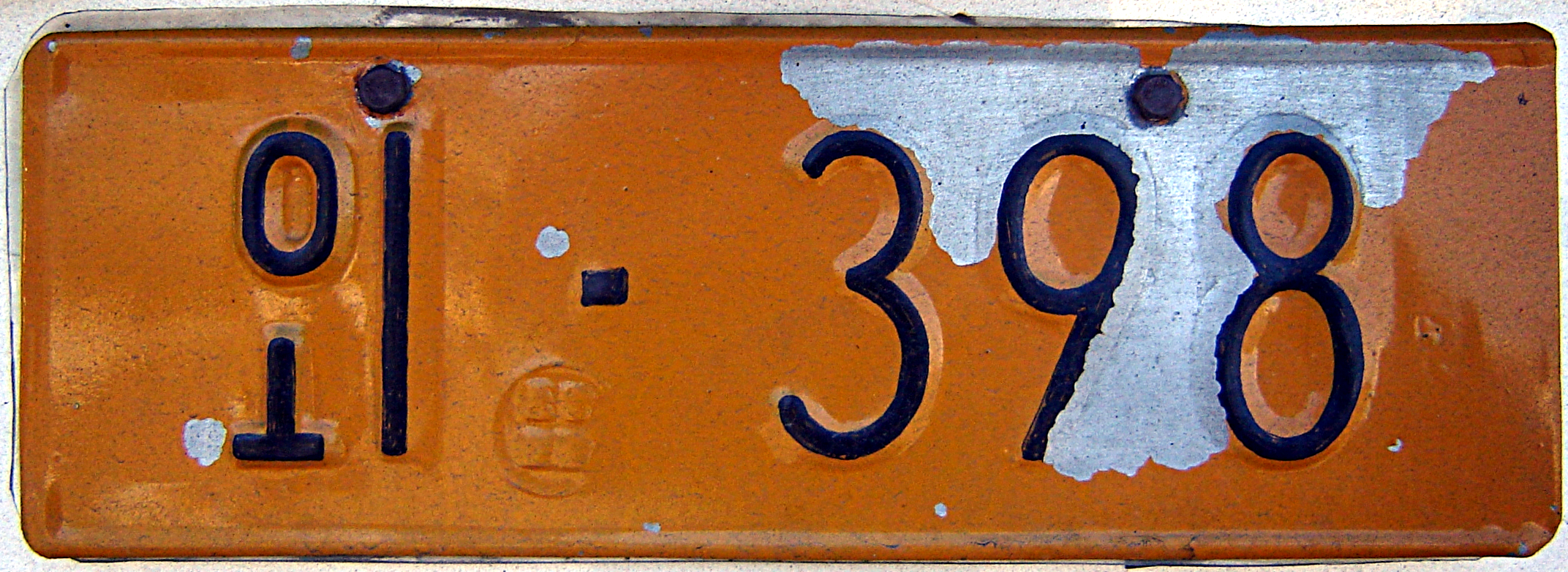
- Old regular legal standard number plate from the DPRK for foreign private individuals
- Country: North Korea
- Country code: None

Current series
- Serial format: Not standard

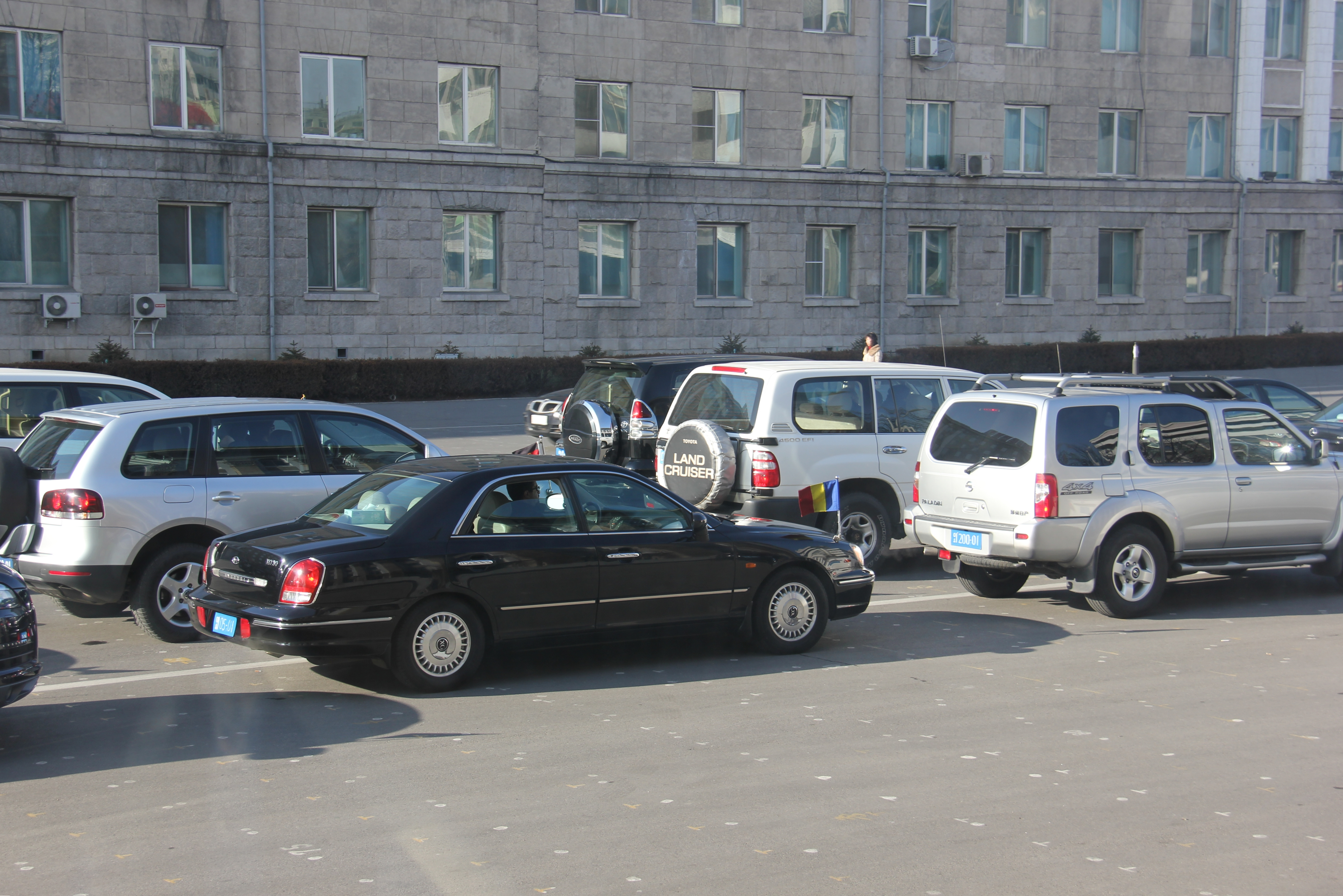
Diplomatic Convoy

North Korea has issued vehicle registration plates for all government and privately owned vehicles since 1947. The system is loosely based on that found in Japan insofar as numerical prefixes are applied to denote a particular type or class of vehicle.

== Plate types ==
Abbreviation (as it appears on the plate)	Romanization of abbreviation	Full name	Hanja	Romanization of full name	Translation
평양	P’yŏngyang	평양시	平壤直轄市	P’yŏngyang Chikhalsi	Pyongyang City
라선	Rasŏn	라선시	羅先特別市	Rasŏn T’ŭkpyŏlsi	Rason City
평남	P’yŏngnam	평안남도	平安南道	P’yŏng’annamdo	South Pyongan Province
평북	P’yŏngbuk	평안북도	平安北道	P’yŏng’anbukto	North Pyongan Province
자강	Chagang	자강도	慈江道	Chagangdo	Chagang Province
황남	Hwangnam	황해남도	黃海南道	Hwanghaenamdo	South Hwanghae Province
황북	Hwangbuk	황해북도	黃海北道	Hwanghaebukto	North Hwanghae Province
강원	Kangwŏn	강원도	江原道	Kangwŏndo	Kangwon Province
함남	Hamnam	함경남도	咸鏡南道	Hamgyŏngnamdo	South Hamgyong Province
함북	Hambuk	함경북도	咸鏡北道	Hamgyŏngbukto	North Hamgyong Province
량강	Ryanggang	량강도	兩江道	Ryanggangdo	Ryanggang Province
남포	Namp'o	남포시	南浦特別市	Namp'o T’ŭkpyŏlsi	Nampo City
개성	Kaesŏng	개성시	開城特別市	Kaesŏng T'ŭkpyŏlsi	Kaesong City

North Korean regulations also prescribe license plate codes for the seven provinces it claims in the territory controlled by South Korea. While all of these claimed provinces were briefly controlled (albeit not always in full) by North Korea in 1950, during the first phase of the Korean War, it is unknown whether plates with these codes were actually issued by the North Korean authorities.

Abbreviation (as it would appear on the plate)	Romanization of abbreviation	Full name	Hanja	Romanization of full name	Translation
충남	Ch’ungnam	충청남도	忠淸南道	P’yŏng’annamdo	South Ch'ungch'ŏng Province
충북	Ch’ungbuk	충청북도	忠淸北道	P’yŏng’anbukto	North Ch'ungch'ŏng Province
경기	Kyŏnggi	경기도	京畿道	Kyŏnggido	Kyŏnggi Province
경남	Kyŏngnam	경상남도	慶尙南道	Kyŏngsangnamdo	South Kyŏngsang Province
경북	Kyŏngbuk	경상북도	慶尙北道	Kyŏngsangbukto	North Kyŏngsang Province
전남	Chŏnnam	전라남도	全羅南道	Chŏllanamdo	South Chŏlla Province
전북	Chŏnbuk	전라북도	全羅北道	Chŏllabukto	North Chŏlla Province

=== Private ===
Privately owned vehicles display yellow plates with black characters. The first two denote the place of registration in the Chosongul script. The remainder are the vehicle's actual registration number. Early examples contained up to four digits. Those issued since 1992 can have up to five digits split into two groups by a hyphen. In the past, most vehicles seen in North Korea had blue or black license plates, indicating state or military ownership while the yellow license plates for private ownership are rare. While North Korea allowed private car ownership with yellow license plates starting in 2017, vehicle registration was only possible under state enterprise or institutional names, making them effectively state-owned enterprise vehicles. However, in 2024, North Korea revised its private vehicle ownership laws to specify procedures for individuals to legally own private vehicles, leading to increase of number of private vehicles with yellow license plates.

Example of a private plate issued in Pyongyang before 1992

평양 1450

Example of a post-1992 series private plate issued in South Pyongan Province

평남 48-366

Example of a current 2016 series private plate issued in Pyongyang

평양-4506

=== State-owned ===
State-owned vehicles and state-owned enterprises vehicles follow the same format as the current private series, except that they display blue plates with white characters (prior to 2016, these were white plates with black characters). The first digit specifies the vehicle type, and the hyphen which separates the groups is optional. The prefix 4 has never been used – possibly because it is considered unlucky in Korea and most of East Asia. Taxis and cars share the same prefix, except the former will only be followed by three digits, whilst the latter can have up to five.

The following table explains which prefixes are allocated to which vehicles.

Numerical prefix	Vehicle type
1x-xxx	Bus
2-xxx	Taxi
2x-xxx(x)	Car
3x-xxx	HGV
5	Ambulance or fire appliance
6	Police or municipal vehicle
7-xx	Motorcycle

Example of a series bus plate issued in Pyongyang before 2016

평양 15-421

Example of a current series bus plate issued in Pyongyang since 2016

평양 15-421

Pre-2016 series state-owned HGV plate issued in North Hamgyong Province

함북 33-968

Current 2016 series state-owned HGV plate issued in North Hamgyong Province

함북 33-968

Pre-1992 motorcycle plate issued in North Hamgyong Province (note that these are black on yellow)

함북 7–16

=== Diplomatic ===
Ambassadorial and diplomatic vehicles are furnished with plates containing white characters on a green background (formerly, two shades of blue have been observed in use, and are illustrated in the examples which follow). The first character is the Chosongul syllable 외 (oe, literal meaning: 'outside'). This is followed by up to five digits separated by a hyphen. The first two digits indicate the embassy.

Former series diplomatic plate issued to staff at the Hungarian embassy

외 07–151

Pre-2016 series diplomatic plate issued to the Indonesian ambassador (note the additional hyphen and different shade of blue)

외-19 - 01

Current 2016 series diplomatic plate issued to the Indonesian ambassador

외 19 - 0001

=== Foreign-owned ===
Foreign-owned vehicles owned by the resident foreign nationals living in North Korea (usually foreign businessmen) are furnished with plates containing white characters on a red background. As is the case with diplomatic plates, the first character is the Chosongul syllable 외 (oe, literal meaning: 'outside'). This is followed by up to six digits separated by a hyphen.

Current 2016 series foreign-owned plate issued to a resident foreign businessman

외 22–0836

=== Military ===
Ordinary personnel vehicles of the Korean People's Army (e.g. trucks and cars) are issued with plates composed entirely of white numbers (separated into two groups by a hyphen) on a black background. A newer series, which is identical those found on state-owned vehicles, is known to exist – the key difference being that the prefix digit does not reflect the vehicle type. Just as is the case in Russia, the registration mark is painted in large characters on the rear of the vehicle above its regular plate.

Regular military personnel plate

5581 – 4218

New-style military personnel plate issued in Pyongyang

평양 53–2621

Heavy duty military vehicles (e.g. TELs and tanks) are not issued with registration plates. Instead, the mark is painted or stencilled onto the actual chassis with white paint.

A series of 'provisional' or 'temporary' plates exists for military vehicles which are used in a testing capacity. These are produced in the same convention as plates for state-owned vehicles but feature a red encircled star in the centre plus two diagonal bars. The words 'People's Army' ('인민군') and 'Test' ('시험') feature in the lower-right corner of the plate.

=== Trolleybuses ===
Trolleybuses are fitted with large white plates composed of nothing more than a three-digit mark. This mark corresponds with the vehicle's unit or fleet number. Because they are unable to leave the confines of the town or city where they are based, it is not uncommon for trolleybuses in other parts of the country to carry the same mark.

Current series trolleybus registration plate

902

=== Kŭmgangsan Special Zone ===
Between 2002 and 2023, vehicles – specifically buses and minibuses – stationed in the Mount Kumgang Tourist Region were issued with green plates with white characters bearing the word 'Kŭmgangsan' (Mount Kumgang) in Chosongul, followed by four digits.

금강산 2–426

=== Red Cross ===
Vehicles used by delegates and staff of the International Red Cross Movement are fitted with blue plates featuring the Chosongul phonetic transliteration of the abbreviation 'RC' (아르씨), followed by a hyphen and serial number, in white.

아르씨-12

=== United Nations ===
Vehicles used by U.N. delegates display black plates which feature the word 'UNICEF' ('유니쎄프' Yunissepŭ) rendered in Chosongul, followed by a hyphen and a serial number, in white. Other UN agencies follow the same pattern, with the agency's name written in Korean transcription (e.g. WHO, UNDP, UNOCHA, etc.)

유니쎄프-20

=== VIP plates ===
A special series of registration plates exists for vehicles which ferry high ranking state and party officials, plus other VIPs. These plates are always prefixed with the combination 7•27 (representing July 27 – the Day of Victory in the Great Fatherland Liberation War) followed by 3 digits (all rendered in white) on either a blue or black background, and do not carry a prefix denoting their province of origin. Traffic marshals frequently salute these vehicles when they pass.

Current 2016 series VIP plate

7•27701

7•27658

==== High ranking plates ====
These are reserved for the highest-ranking government officials of North Korea.

727•0001

President of the State Affairs Commission

727•0002

Premier of North Korea

727•0003

Chairman of the Standing Committee of the Supreme People's Assembly

== See also ==
- Automotive industry in North Korea
- Transport in North Korea
