= Automotive industry in North Korea =

The automotive industry in North Korea is a branch of the national economy, with much lower production than the automotive industry in South Korea. In North Korea, motor vehicle production is focused on military and industrial goals, including construction; few private citizens own cars, though revisions to laws in 2024 and 2025 has led to an increase in private car ownership.

The Democratic People's Republic of Korea (DPRK) is not involved in the Organisation Internationale des Constructeurs d'Automobiles (OICA) or any other United Nations industrial committee, so information about its motor vehicle industry is limited. The OICA does not publish figures for automobile production in the DPRK. As reported by a limited number of observers with first-hand knowledge, North Korea can produce 40,000 to 50,000 vehicles a year.

== History ==
The North Korean automobile industry had its origins during the Soviet era, and the DPRK began motor-vehicle production with licenses obtained from the USSR. The Soviet Union helped to build automotive plants in the country, which were then equipped with Soviet machines. North Korea's first domestically produced automobiles were copies of Soviet designs, such as the GAZ-51 midi-truck, the GAZ 69 off-road four-wheel drive vehicle, and the GAZ-M20 Pobeda passenger car.

In October 2024 and January 2025, revisions to the Private Car Utilization Law introduced detailed procedures for individuals to own automobiles in the country. The new law guarantees personal ownership of private cars and legally protects inheritance rights, making it possible to pass down vehicles to relatives, though they cannot privately sell their vehicles to others, unless they are married or directly related and restricts the lending of vehicles to immediate family members. The law stipulates that only government-certified institutions can sell private cars at prices set by the state through designated dealerships and limits ownership to one car per household. It also prohibits usage of private cars for commercial purposes. The revised laws led to a boom in private car ownership, especially in the capital Pyongyang, driven by imports of Chinese automotives rebadged with North Korean manufacturer labels.

== Motor-vehicle manufacturers ==
=== Sungri Motor Plant ===
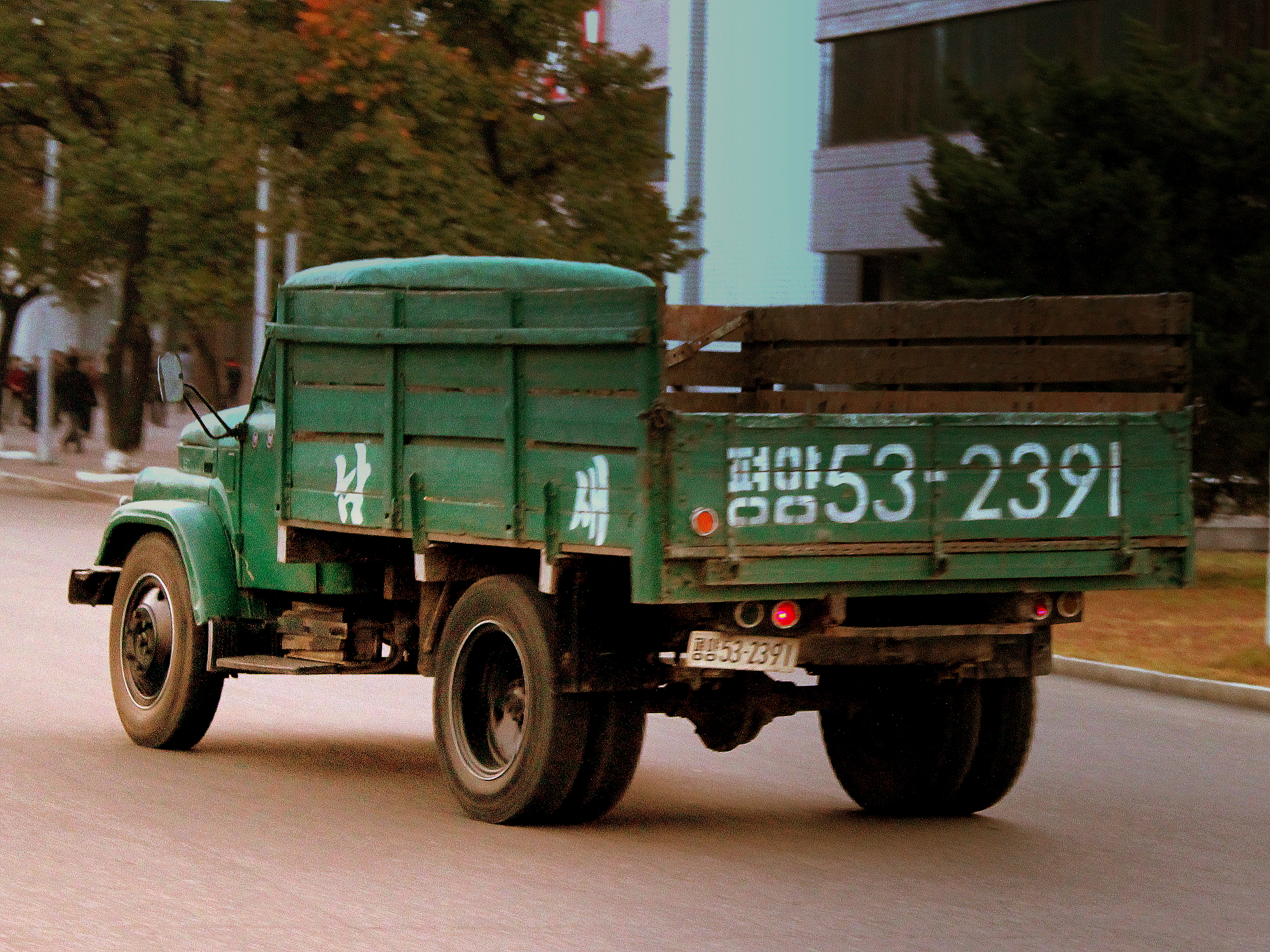
The Sungri-58 truck

Since 1950, Sungri Motor Plant in Tokchon has been North Korea's first and largest motor vehicle plant, producing urban and off-road passenger cars and small, medium, and heavy cargo, haulage, construction, and off-road trucks and buses under the names Sungri and Jaju, among others. It was the most capable plant of the North Korean automotive industry before being surpassed by Pyeonghwa Motors. All models are reported to be replicas or derivations of foreign cars. Its vehicles are generally for civilian and commercial use; government officials favour foreign imports and the armed forces have their own facilities.

The Sungri Motor Plant was founded in November 1950 as the Tokchon Motor Plant. It produced its first vehicle, a Sungri-58 truck, in 1958. In 1975, the plant was renamed Sungri Motor Plant (sungri means victory in Korean). In 1980, annual production was reported by the government to be 20,000 units per year, but the rate was more likely 6,000–7,000 units. In 1996, production was crippled by the country's economic difficulties, with about 150 vehicles produced.

=== Pyeonghwa Motors ===
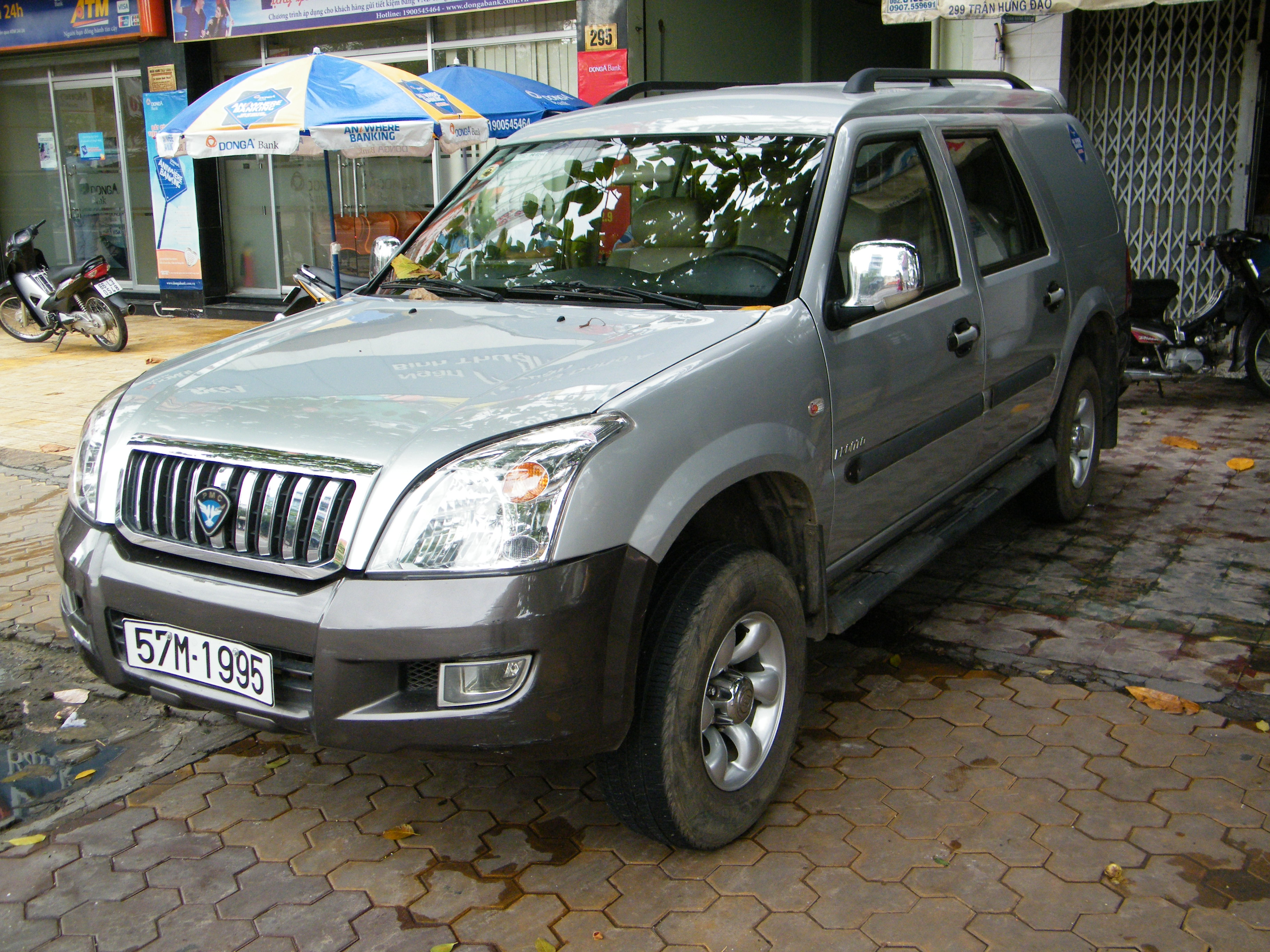
Pyeonghwa Pronto GS

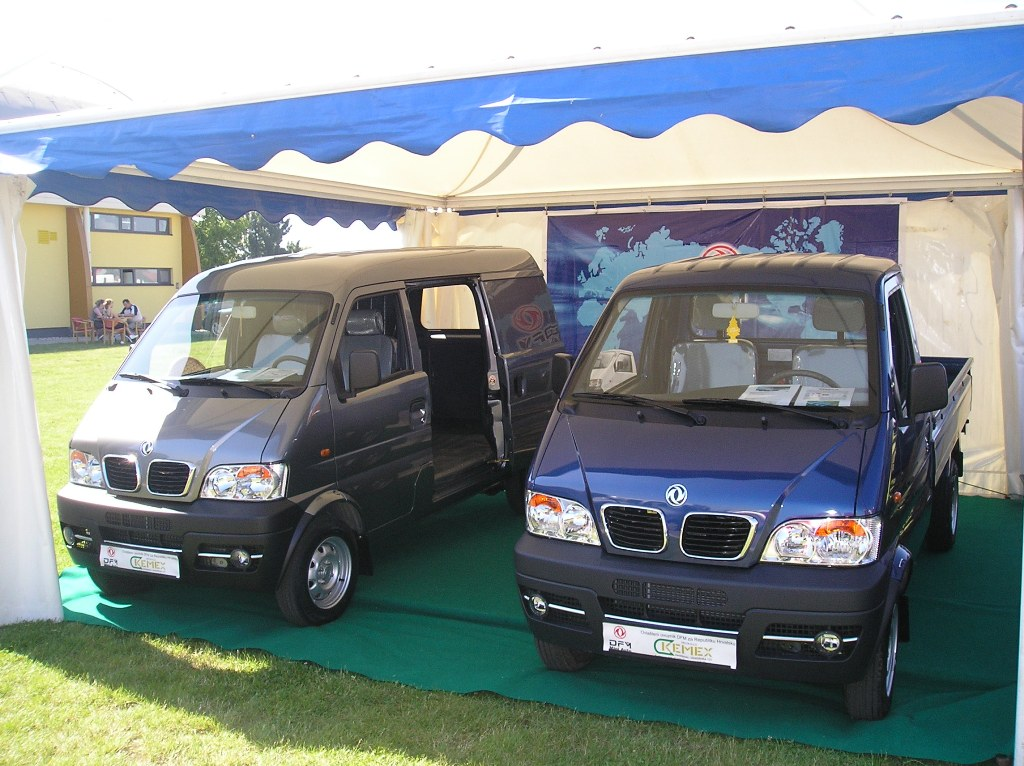
Pyeonghwa Paso 990

Founded in 2000, Pyeonghwa Motors in Nampo is an auto manufacturing and retailing joint venture between South Korea's Pyeonghwa Motors (owned by Sun Myung Moon's Unification Church) and the North Korea's Ryonbong General Corp. Pyeonghwa Motors products are sold under the names Hwiparam, Bbeokgugi (Peokkugi) and Zunma: small and luxury cars, minivans, SUVs and pick-up trucks under license.

Pyeonghwa has the exclusive rights to production, purchase, and sale of used cars in North Korea. Most North Koreans are unable to own cars. Because the market for cars in the country is so small, Pyeonghwa's output is reportedly very low. In 2003, 314 cars were produced, even though the factory could build up to 10,000 cars a year. Erik van Ingen Schenau, author of Automobiles Made in North Korea, has estimated the company's total production in 2005 at no more than about 400 vehicles.

In summer 2006, the North Korean government magazine Foreign Trade, which advertises North Korean products, published a photograph of the Junma, a new luxury car produced by Pyeonghwa, which appears to be a rebadged version of the South Korean SsangYong Chairman. The Chairman bears a strong resemblance to Mercedes-Benz cars, which are favored by North Korean government officials, and is based on an old Mercedes E-Class design.

In 2006, Pyeonghwa reached an agreement with Chinese manufacturer Brilliance China Auto to assemble its Jinbei Haise vans, which are based on an old version of the Toyota HiAce.

In 2009, Pyeonghwa announced a profit on its North Korean operations.

The Premio and Pronto are also sold in Vietnam by Mekong Auto. Both are based on Huanghai vehicles. Mekong Auto has sold Fiat cars in Vietnam since 1995, and this relationship may have led to Pyeonghwa's building Fiats in North Korea.

=== Pyongsang Auto Works ===
In 1968, Pyongsang Auto Works in Pyongsang took over Sungri Motor Plant's production of Kaengsaeng and Kaengsaeng NA models: a modified Sungri-4.10 4x4 car (the GAZ 69-Jeep combination) and a modified Sungri-4.25 4x4 pickup. During the 1970s, it also began production of Taebaeksan and Tujaeng light trucks. They also produced the Pyongyang 4.10 and Kaengsaeng 88, which are unauthorized clones of the Mercedes-Benz W201 luxury passenger car.

=== Chongjin Bus Works ===
Since 1974, the Chongjin Bus Works has produced the Jipsam 74, the Jipsam 86 articulated trolleybus and Jipsam 86 and 88 buses. In more recent years, it has produced modern trolleybuses styled in the Chollima 321 from Pyongyang.

=== Pyongyang Trolleybus Factory ===
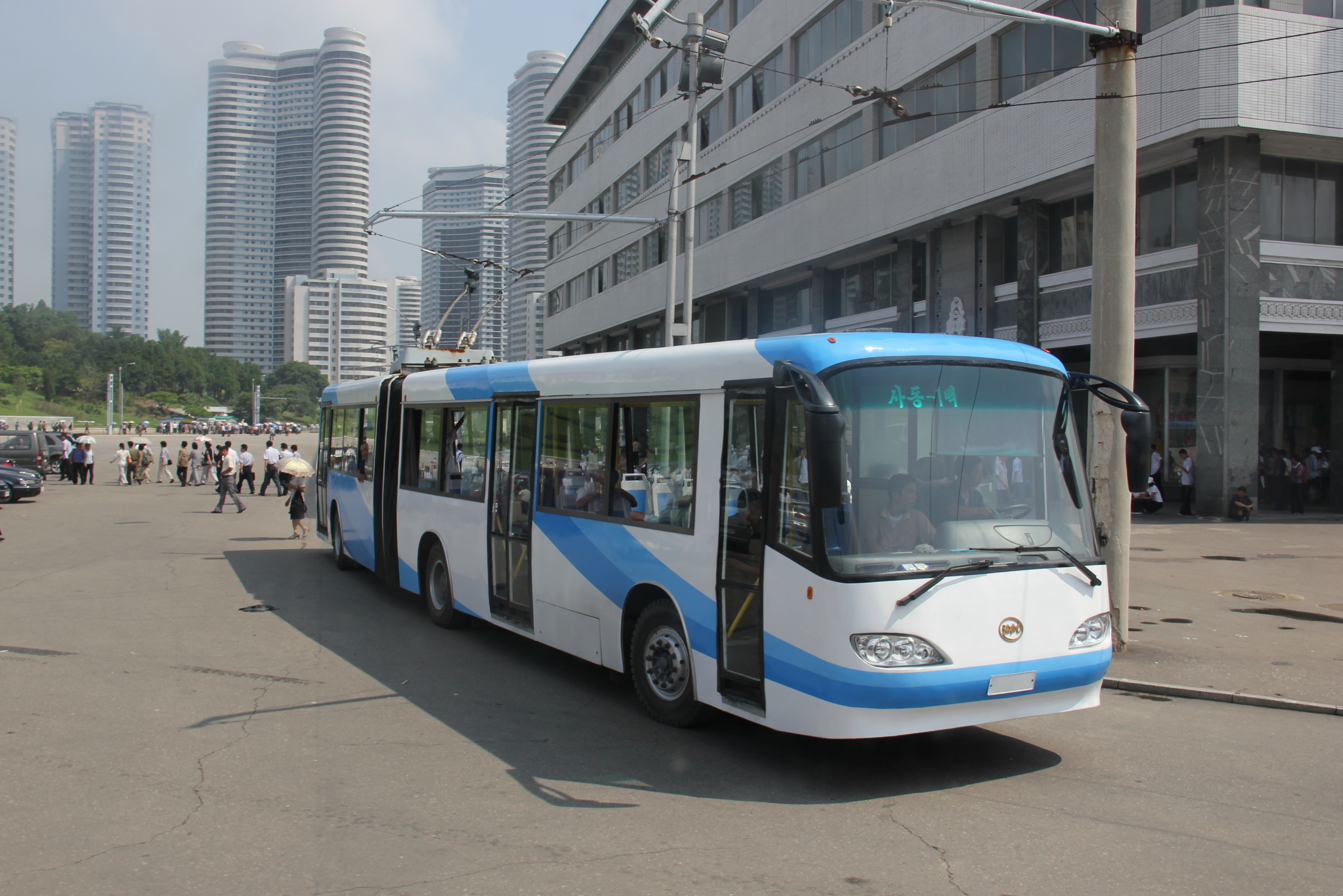
Chollima-091 trolleybus at line

Since 1961, Pyongyang Trolleybus Works has produced Chollima 9.11, 9.25, 70, 72, 74, 84, 90, 901, 903, 961, 971, 091, 316 and 321. It has also made some conversions of Ikarus 260, Ikarus 280 and Karosa B732/C734 trolleybuses. In 2018, the factory was modernised and now features modern technology such as CNC machines.

=== Kim Jong Tae Locomotive Works ===
Kim Jong-tae Locomotive Works in Pyongyang has produced a modified Chinese Shenyang ST4 trams in the 1990s. Some Tatra T6B5 also saw some form of modernisation.

=== Pyongyang Bus Factory ===
In 2021, the factory produced two new buses: the Pyongyang 191 double decker bus and the Pyongyang 192 bus. This factory also builds the Tongil tram, a body replacement of the Tatra KT8D5.

== See also ==
- Vehicle registration plates of North Korea
- Transport in North Korea
