= Sungri Motor Plant =

Vehicle factory in Tokchon, North Korea

Korean name
- Hangul: 승리자동차공장
- Hanja: 勝利自動車工場
- RR: Seungni jadongcha gongjang
- MR: Sŭngni chadongch'a kongjang

Sungri Motor Plant, sometimes known as Sungri Motor Complex / Sungri General Motor Enterprise, is a 600,000 m^{2} vehicle factory in the city of Tokchon (덕천), North Korea. It was the most capable plant of the North Korean automotive industry before being surpassed by Pyeonghwa Motors. The plant produces urban and off-road passenger cars, small, medium, and heavy cargo, as well as haulage construction and off-road trucks and buses.

All models are reported to be replicas or derivations of foreign cars. Vehicles are generally for civilian and commercial use, as government officials favour foreign imports and the armed forces have their own facilities.

== History ==
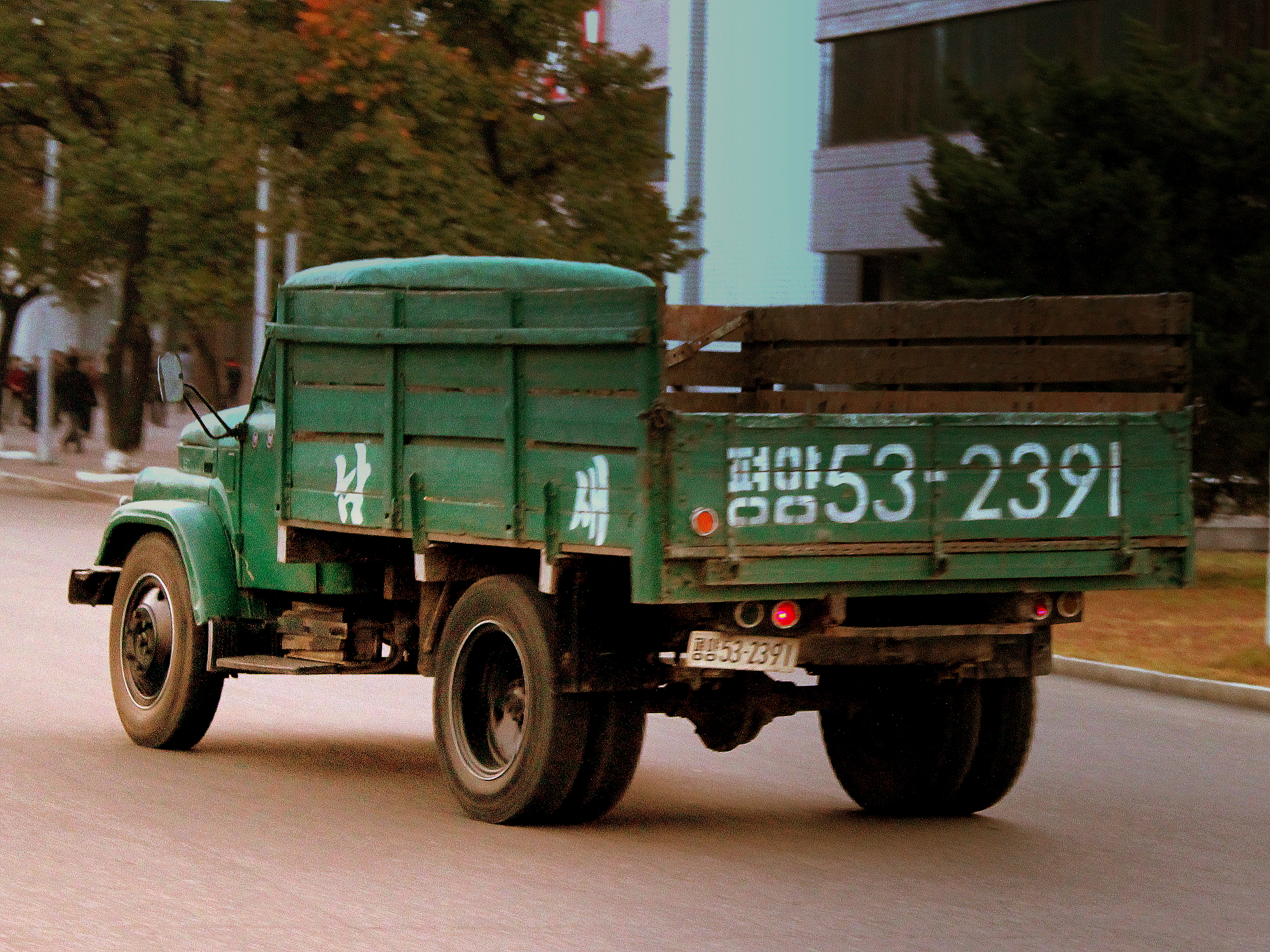
The Sungri-58 truck

The Sungri Motor Plant was founded in November 1950 as the Tokchon Motor Plant (덕천자동차공장). It produced its first vehicle, a Sungri-58 truck, in 1958. In 1975, the plant was renamed Sungri Motor Plant (sungri meaning victory in Korean). In 1980, annual production was reported by the government to be 20,000 units per year, however the rate was more likely between 6,000 and 7,000 units per year. In 1996, production was crippled due to the country's economic difficulties, with approximately 150 units produced.

On November 20, 2017, Kim Jong-un was reported to have visited and provided on-the-spot guidance at the Sungri Motor Plant.

In March 2021, it's reported that SMP has a new production hall.

== Car models ==
- Kunchook (건축 - 'Construction')
- Jaju (자주 - 'Independence' or 'Frequent') - A five-seat passenger car. Clone of the Volkswagen Passat (possibly based on Volkswagen Santana production in China); however, there is no proof it was produced.
- Kaengsaeng 68 (갱생 - 'Rebirth') - A more modified Sungri-4.15 of 1968; production was later moved to the Pyongsang Auto Works.
- Pyongyang 4.10 and Kaengsaeng 88 - Unauthorized clones of the Mercedes-Benz W201 luxury passenger car.
- Shintaibaik (신태백 - 'New Taebaek')
- Sungri 4.15 - License-built version of the Soviet GAZ-69 truck. Renamed to Kaengsaeng 68 in 1968.
- Sungri 4.25 - Pick-up version of the Sungri 4.15.
- Paektustan ('Mount Paekdu') Four-door sedan, built in very small numbers.

== Truck models ==
- Kumsusan, Kyomsusang (금수산 - 'Mount Kumsu') - A 40-ton construction truck-dumper of 1979.
- Sonyon - Small urban delivery truck of the 1990s.
- Sungri-58 (승리 58호 - 'Victory 58') - A clone of the Soviet GAZ-51 (ГАЗ-51) Truck, however with weaker springs. The Sungri-58 also suffers from unusually high fuel consumption due to its crudely copied GAZ-51 carburetor which has been used since 1961. It was first built in 1958. Later Sungri-58KA and Sungri-58NA (4×4) modifications with new cabin are appeared in the 1970s.
- Sungri-60/10.10) - A large 6×6 truck of 1960, it has a ten-ton payload and was used primarily for military purposes. It was featured on a North Korean stamp from 1961.
- Sungri-61 - Based on the GAZ-63 (ГАЗ-63) truck. It is a 4×4 version of Sungri-58. The Sungri-61 was first built in 1961. Later Sungri-61NA increased payload to 2 tons and a new cabin.
- Sungri/Jaju-64 - Based on the KrAZ 256. A 6×4 dump truck, it has a 10-ton payload and 15-litre V8-cylinder diesel engine. It was featured on a North Korean stamp from 1965. Built from 1964 to 1982.
- Sungri/Jaju-82 - A 4×2 multi-purpose truck of 1982, it has a 10-ton payload and a 15-litre V8-cylinder diesel engine. It was featured in a North Korean stamp from 1988. Sometimes referred to as "Chaju".
- Sungrisan/Konsor-25 ('Mount Victory'/'Construction') - A 25-ton dumper of 1970. It is based on the BelAZ trucks. Later built by the March 30th Works.

== See also ==
- Automotive industry in North Korea
- Economy of North Korea
