= Transport in North Korea =

1990 map of roads, rails, ports and airports, prepared by the Ministry of Defense of South Korea

Transport in North Korea is constrained by economic problems and government restrictions. Public transport predominates, and most of it is electrified.

== Restrictions on freedom of movement ==
Travel to North Korea is tightly controlled. The standard route to and from North Korea is by plane or train via Beijing. Transport directly to and from South Korea was possible with Vip Family Zone Tour and travel within the cities on a limited scale from 2003 until 2008, when a road was opened (bus tours, no private cars). Freedom of movement in North Korea is also limited, as citizens are not allowed to move around freely inside their own country. On October 14, 2018, North and South Korea agreed to restore inter-Korean rail and road transportation. On November 22, 2018, North and South Korea reopened a road on the Korean border which had been closed since 2004. On November 30, 2018, inter-Korean rail transportation resumed when a South Korean train crossed into North Korea for the first time since November 2008. On December 8, 2018, a South Korean bus crossed into North Korea.

== Roads ==
Main roads of North Korea (as of 2009)

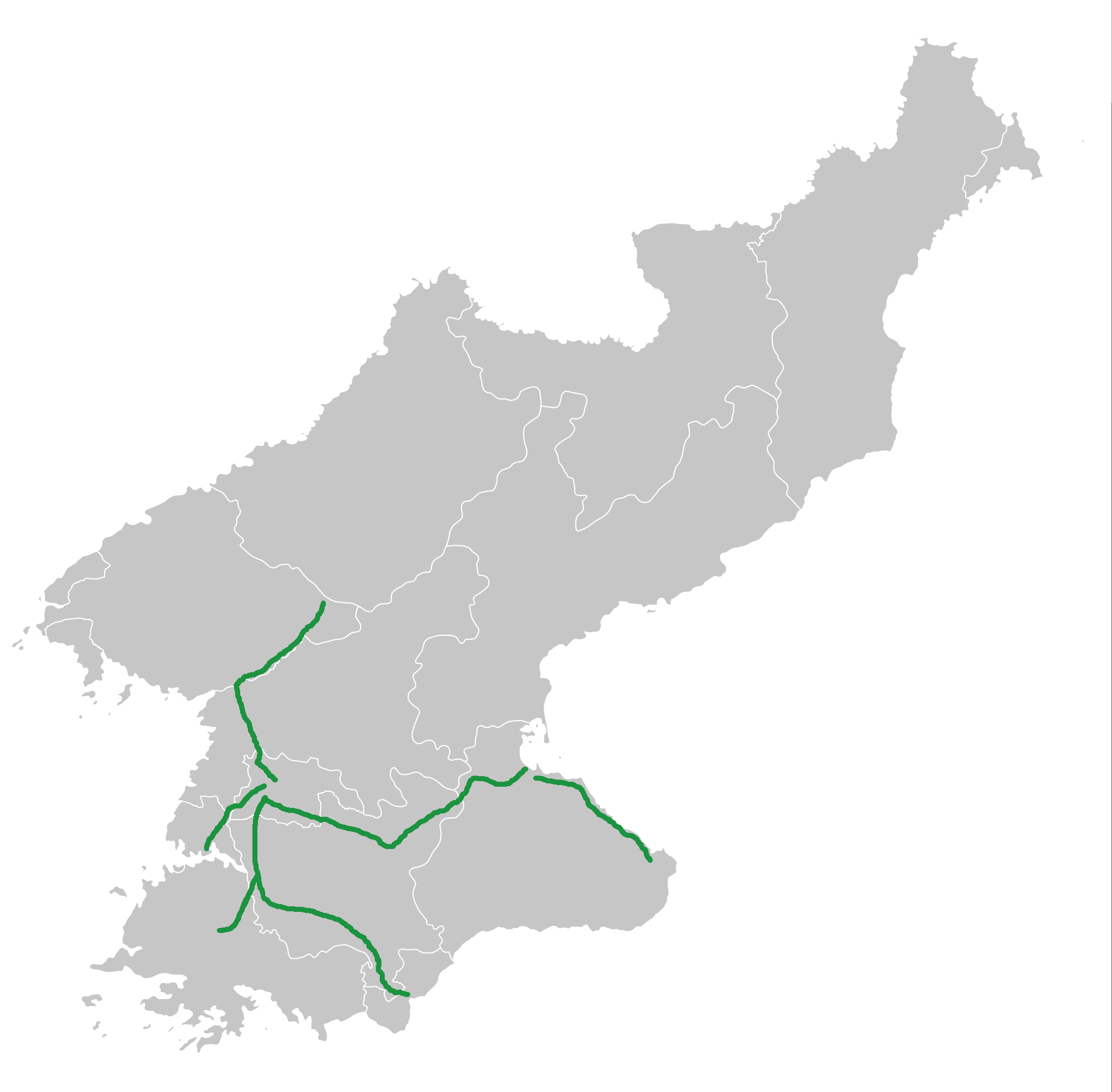
Map of motorways in North Korea (as of 2014)

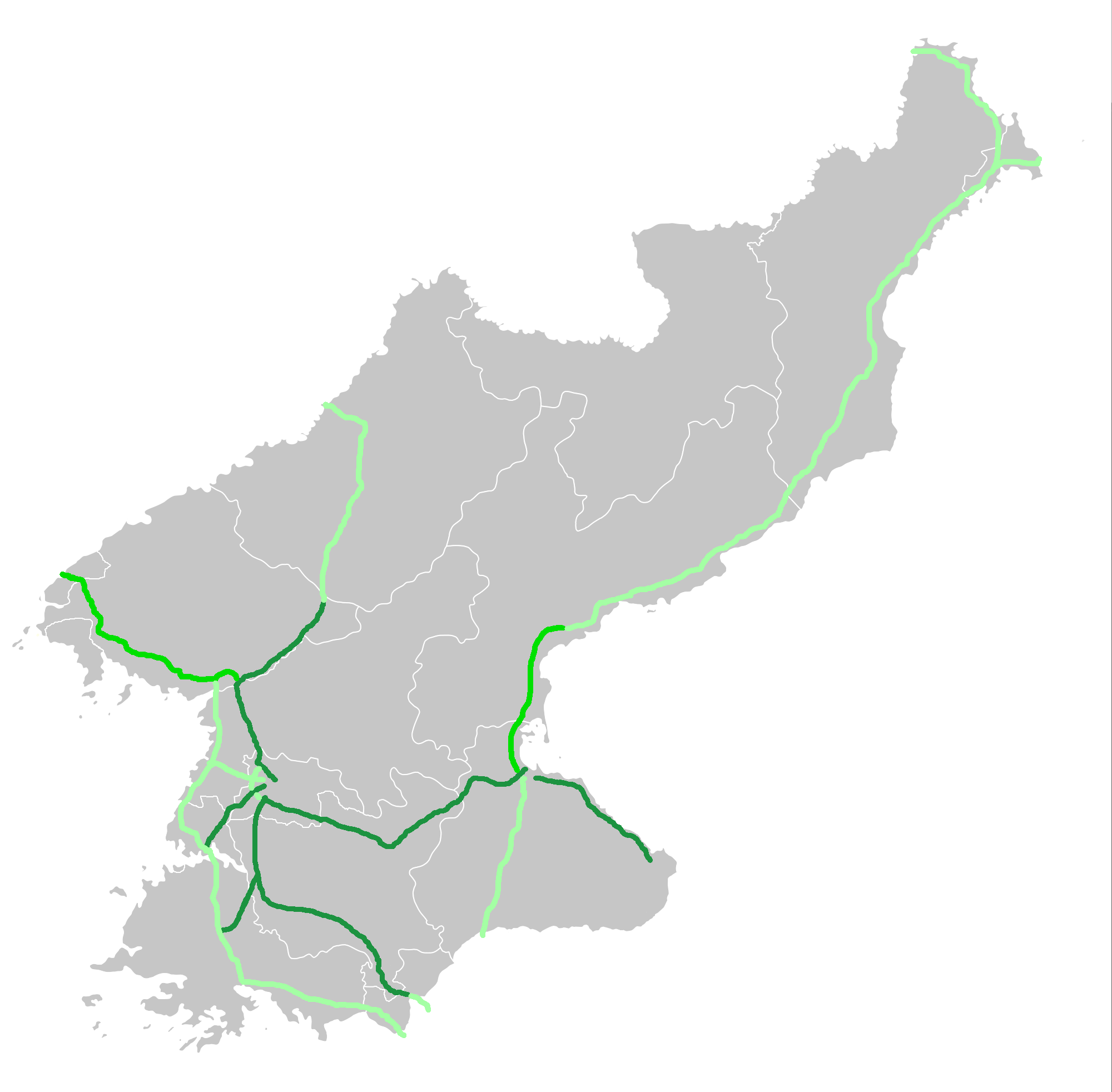
Future motorway plans (as of 2014)

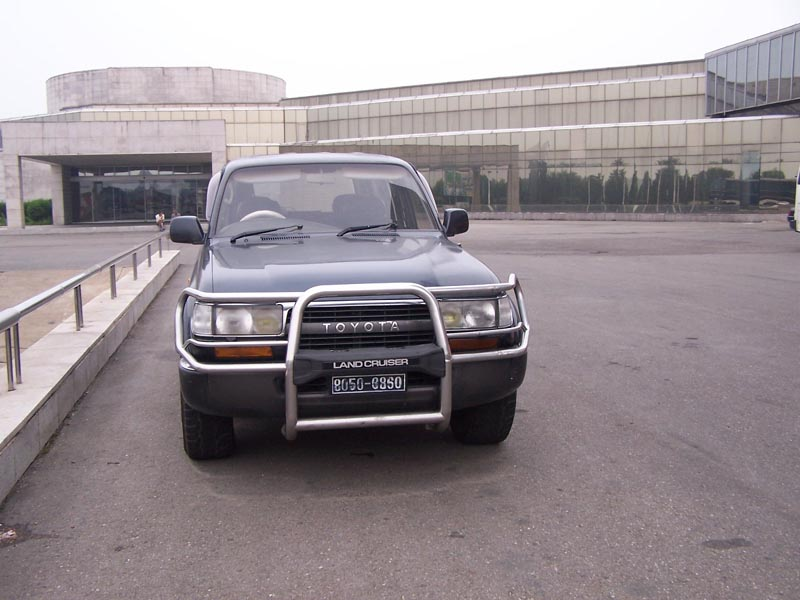
Right-hand drive (RHD) Toyota Land Cruiser in front of a Pyongyang hotel

Fuel constraints and the near absence of private automobiles have relegated road transportation to a secondary role. The road network was estimated to be around 31,200 kilometres (19,400 mi) in 1999, up from between 23,000 kilometres (14,000 mi) and 30,000 kilometres (19,000 mi) in 1990, of which only 1,717 kilometres (1,067 mi), 7.5%, are paved. However, The World Factbook (published by the US Central Intelligence Agency) lists 25,554 kilometres (15,879 mi) of roads with only 724 kilometres (450 mi) paved as of 2006.

There are three major multilane highways in North Korea: the Pyongyang–Wonsan Tourist Motorway, a 200-kilometre (120 mi) expressway connecting Pyongyang and Wonsan on the east coast, the Youth Hero Motorway, a 43-kilometre (27 mi) expressway connecting Pyongyang and its port, Nampo, and the Pyongyang-Kaesong Motorway, a four-lane 100-kilometre (62 mi) motorway linking Pyongyang and Kaesong. The overwhelming majority of the estimated 264,000 vehicles in use in 1990 were for the military. Rural bus service connects all villages, and all major cities have bus and tram services. Since 1945/1946, there is right-hand traffic on roads. In cities, driving speeds are set by which lane a driver is in. The speed limits are 40 kilometres per hour (25 mph), 60 kilometres per hour (37 mph), and 70 kilometres per hour (43 mph) for the first, second, and subsequent (if existing) lanes from the right, respectively. A white-on-blue sign informs about this. The leftmost lane, if it is number 3 from the right or higher and is not a turning lane, is often left vacant, even by tourist buses, while the second-from-right lane is generally used to overtake vehicles from lane one, such as public transport buses and trams.

Besides the blue in-city sign, all other occasions, such as motorways and roads outside cities, use the more widely known red-circle-with-number-inside sign to post speed limits. On motorways, the typical limit is 80 kilometres per hour (50 mph) and 100 kilometres per hour (62 mph) for lanes from the right, respectively, as posted on the Pyongyang-Kaesong highway, for example. The rightmost lane of a motorway is sometimes, as seen on the Pyongyang–Myohyang highway, limited to 60 kilometres per hour (37 mph) near on-ramp joining points.

Since about 2014, horizontally mounted traffic lights and cameras have been installed in central Pyongyang and other cities. Outside Pyongyang, roundabouts are often used on busy junctions. As of 2016 there is 26,176 kilometres (16,265 mi) of road which is 25% of South Korea's road system in length.

As of 2017, electric bicycles are becoming popular in Pyongyang; about 5% of bicycles are electric. Both locally produced and Chinese electric bicycles were available.

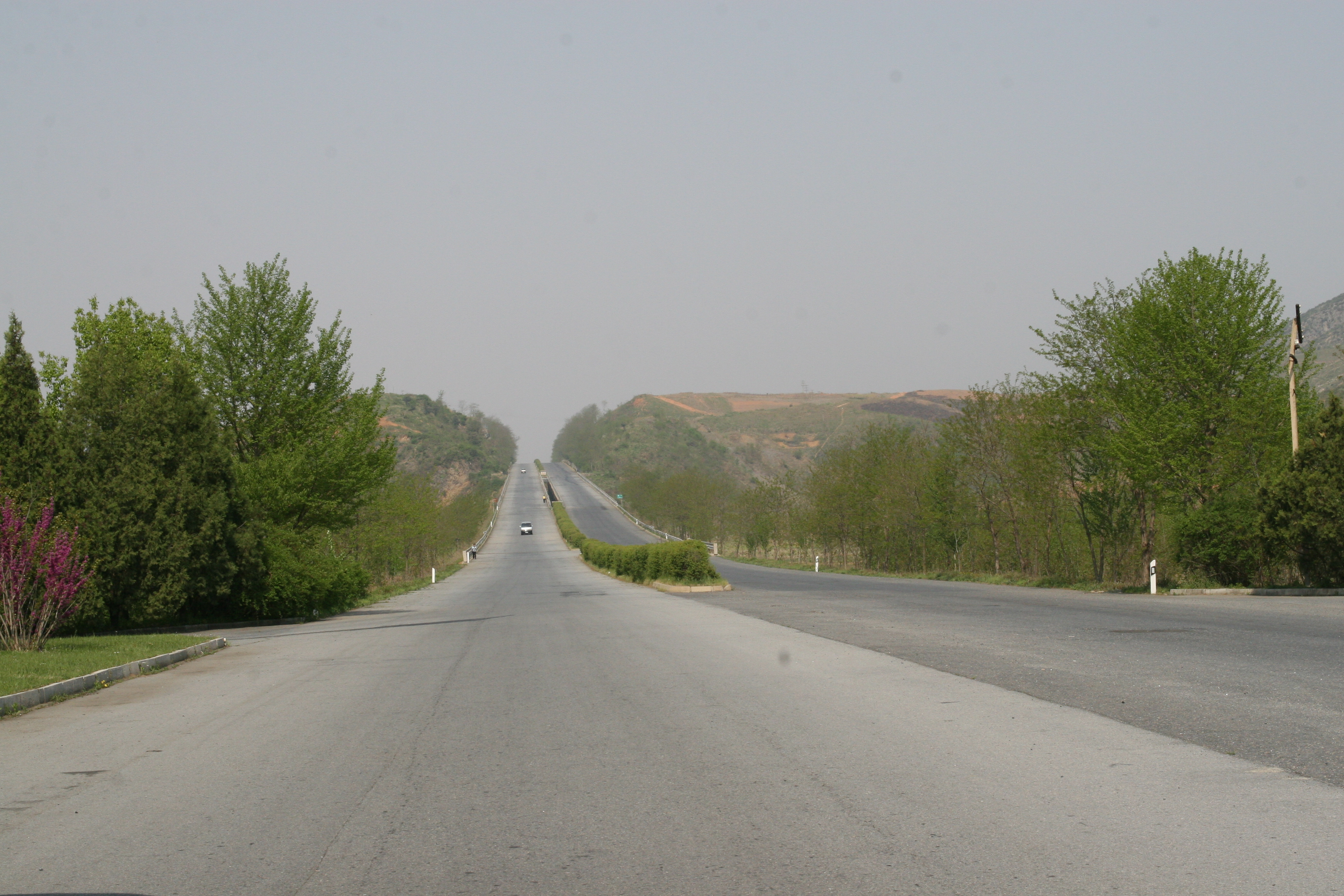
A highway outside of Pyongyang

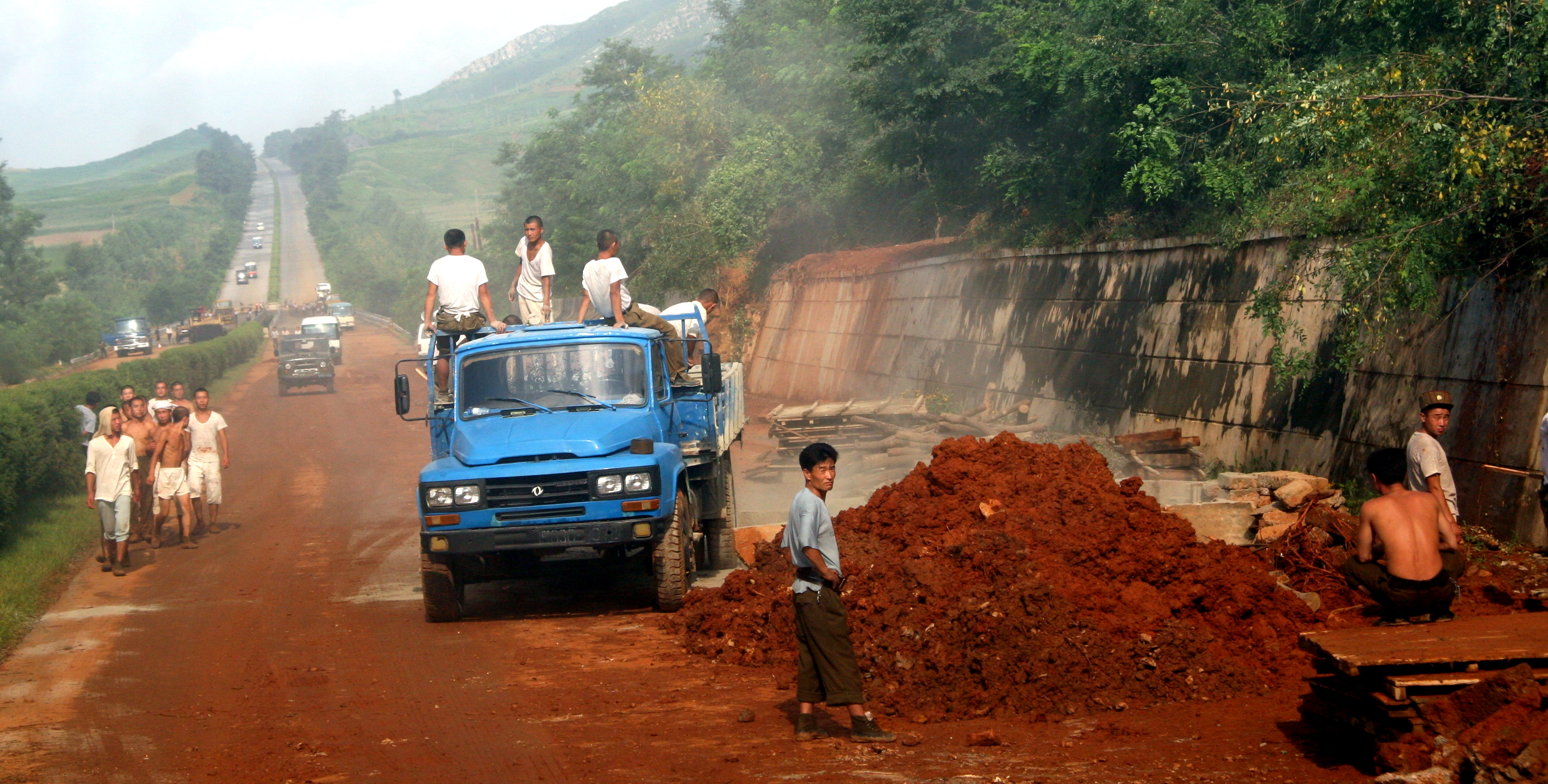
Roadwork construction in North Korea. The blue truck in the foreground is a Chinese-made Dongfeng EQ140.

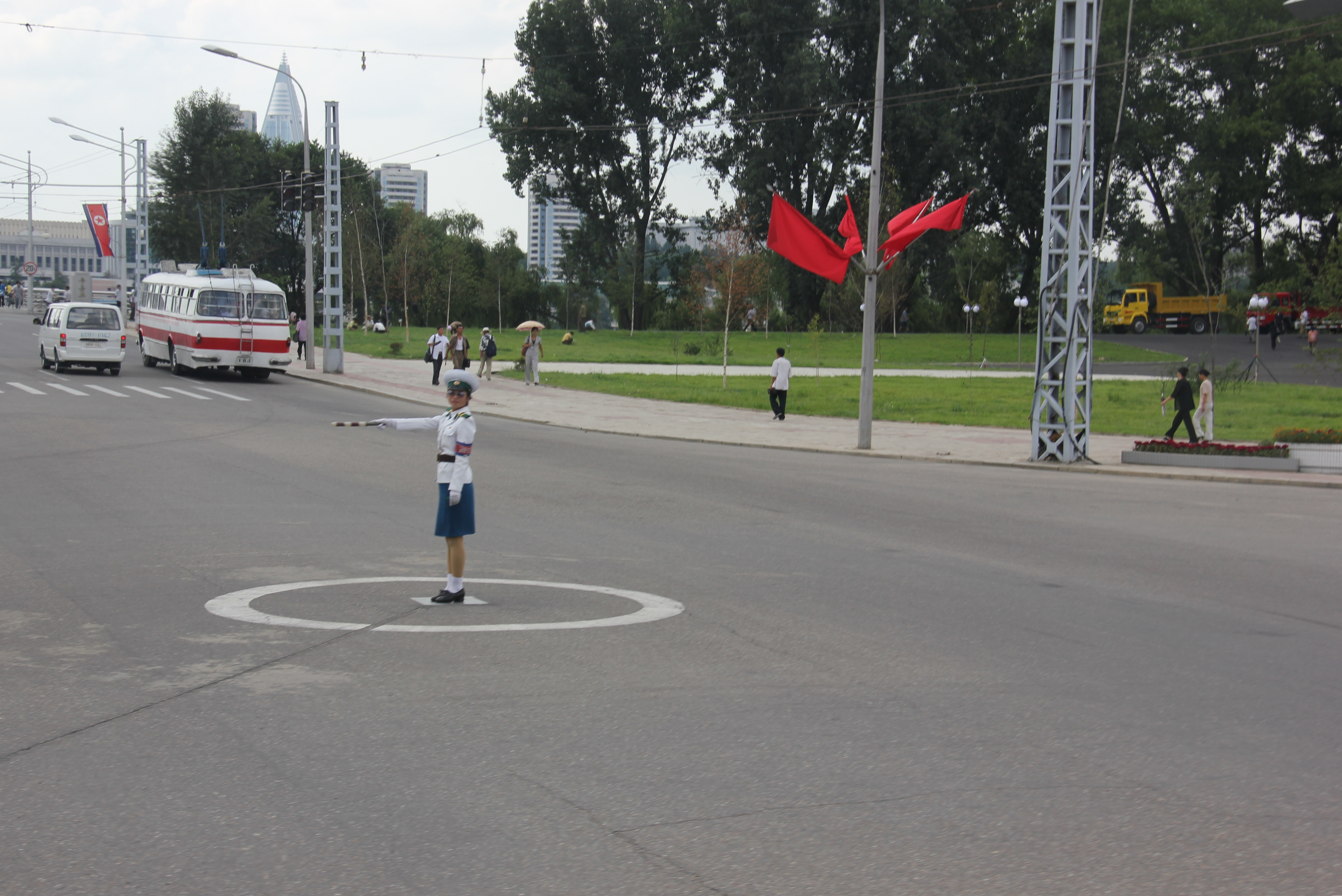
A road junction in Pyongyang

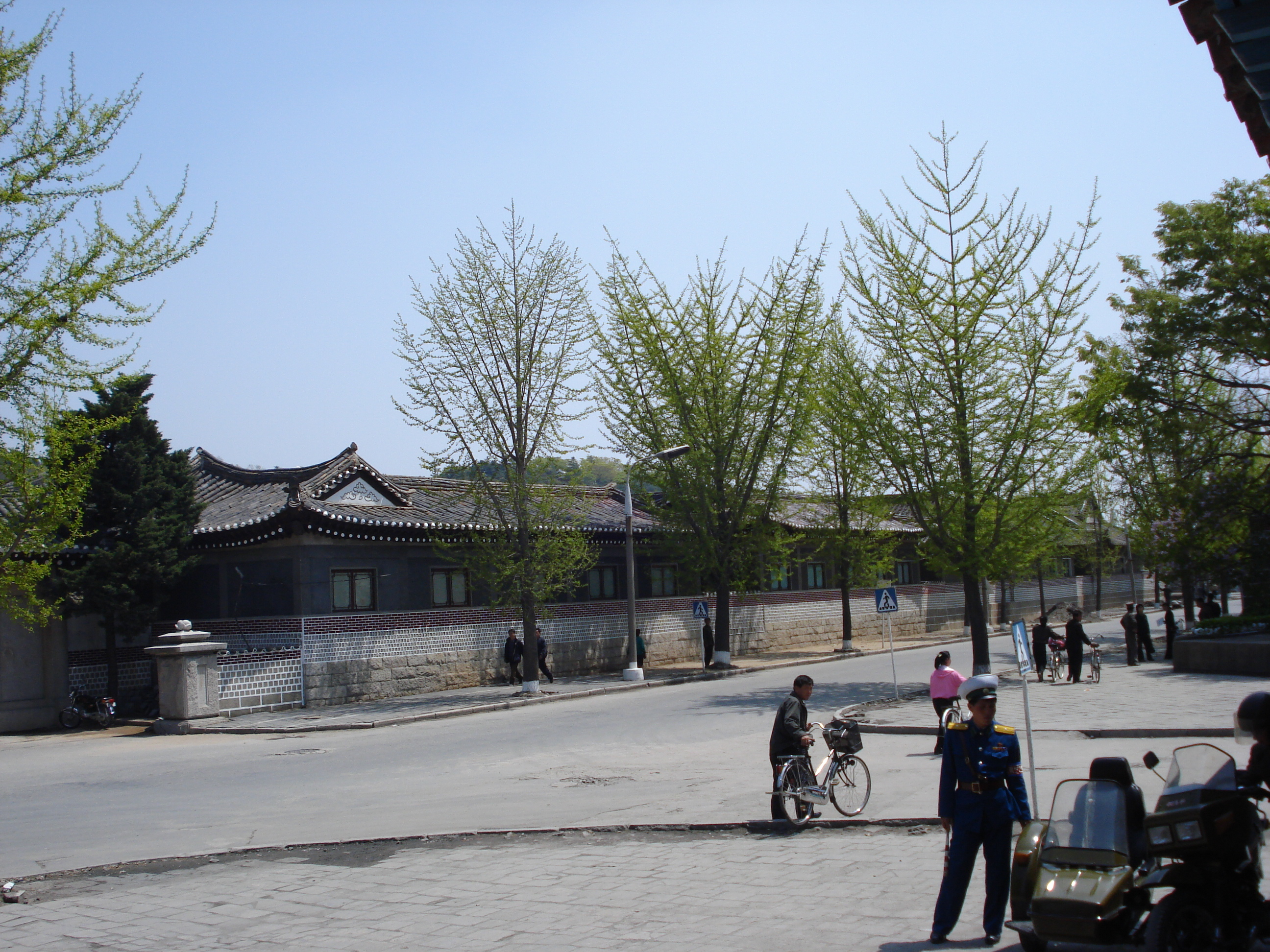
A side road in Kaesong

== Public transport ==
There is a mix of locally built and imported trolleybuses and trams in the major urban centres of North Korea. Earlier fleets were obtained from Europe and China.

For the list of trolleybus systems in North Korea, see this list.

Other forms of public transport include a commuters' narrow gauge railway from Hamhung to Hungnam which links to the 2.8 Vinylon Complex.

North Korea also has regularly scheduled motorcoach service connecting major cities and nearby towns to one another, which can be identified by their destination signs. For example, Pyongyang-Sariwon, or Pyongyang-Wonsan. Some bus lines supplement the electric transportation in Pyongyang, as seen in a 1989 map that was likely obtained during the 13th World Festival of Youth and Students.

Some routes are still identifiable, such as the route 10, which now has a destination of Sadong-Daedongmun, and has its own stop on Okryu street. Some parts have changed much more drastically, like the southwest of Pyongyang, which has seen a lot of new construction. One thing that makes tracing the routes difficult is that all kinds of transportation vehicles in North Korea rarely show a route number, opting for a destination sign instead. Some buses may be used for non-regularly scheduled service, but are indistinguishable because all the buses are state owned and can be used for a variety of purposes.

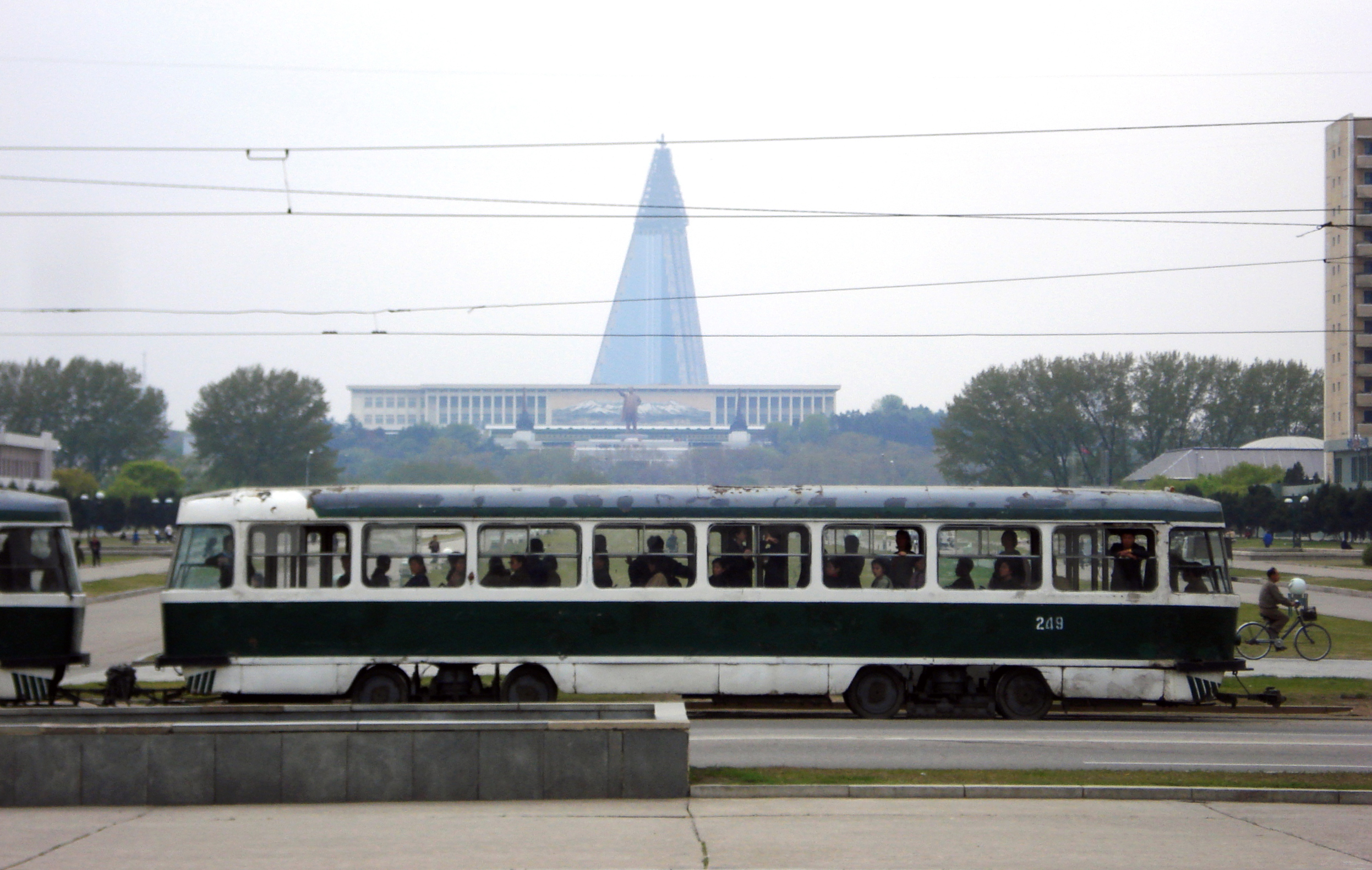
Pyongyang tram in 2009

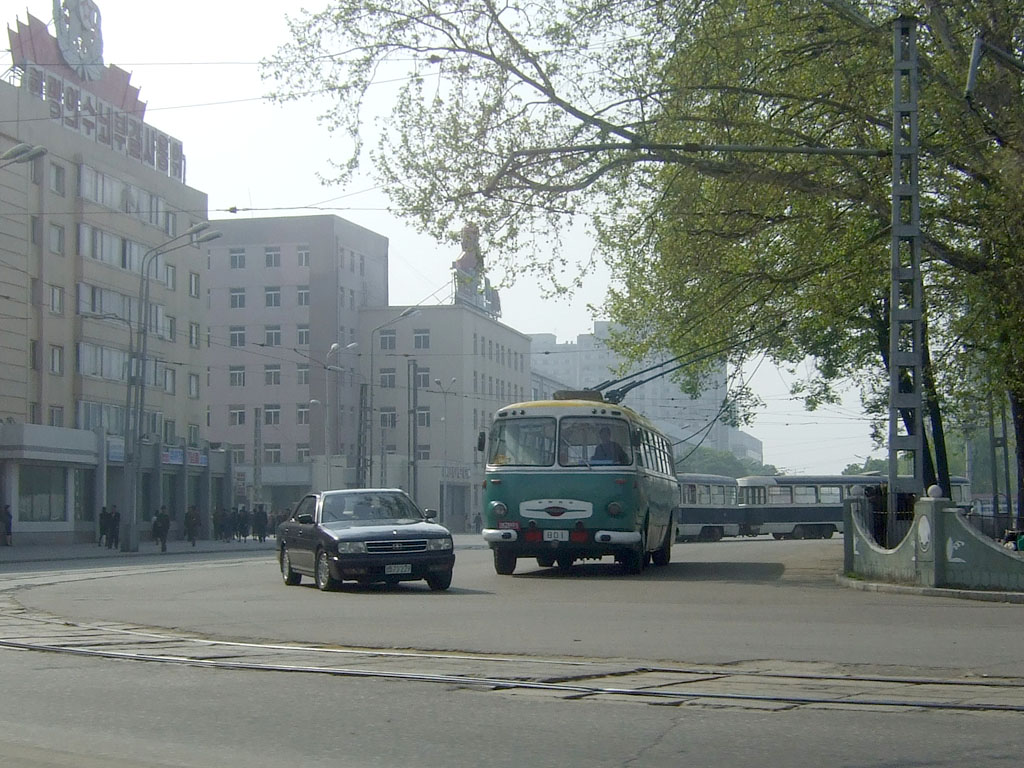
Trolleybus near Pyongyang Railway Station in 2007

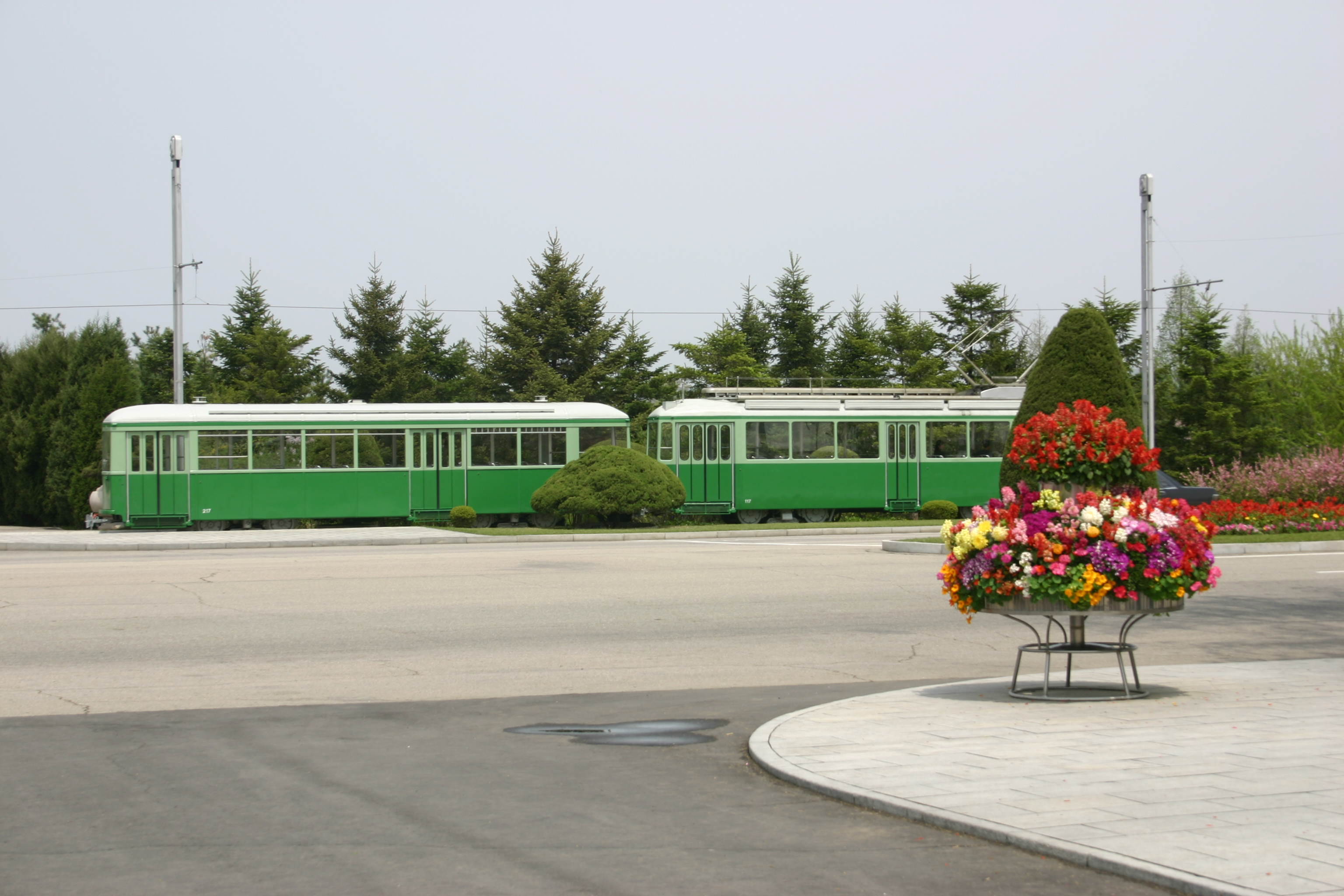
Former Zurich type Be 4/4 tram on the Kumsusan Memorial Palace line

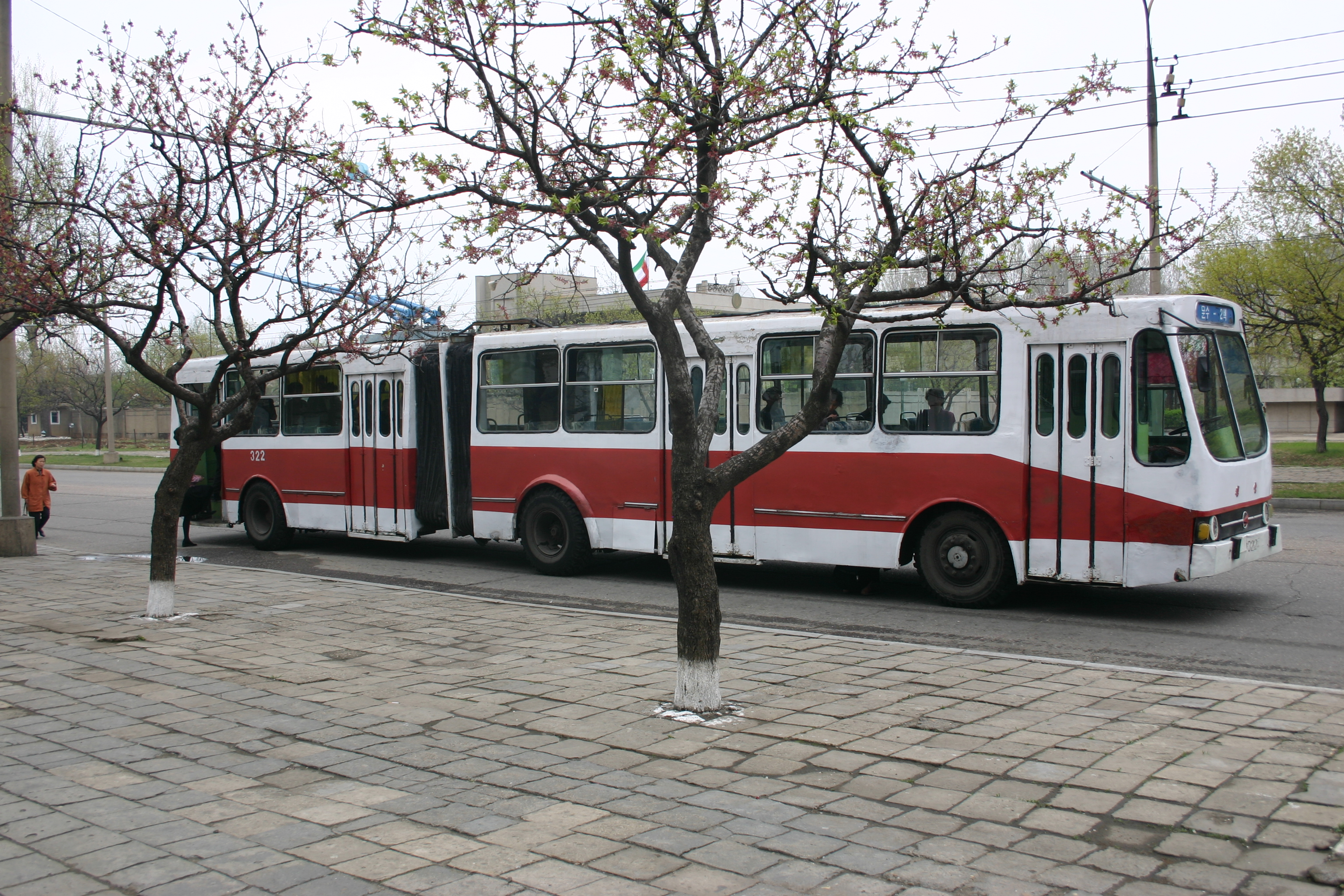
A Pyongyang Trolleybus Works Chongnyonjunwi

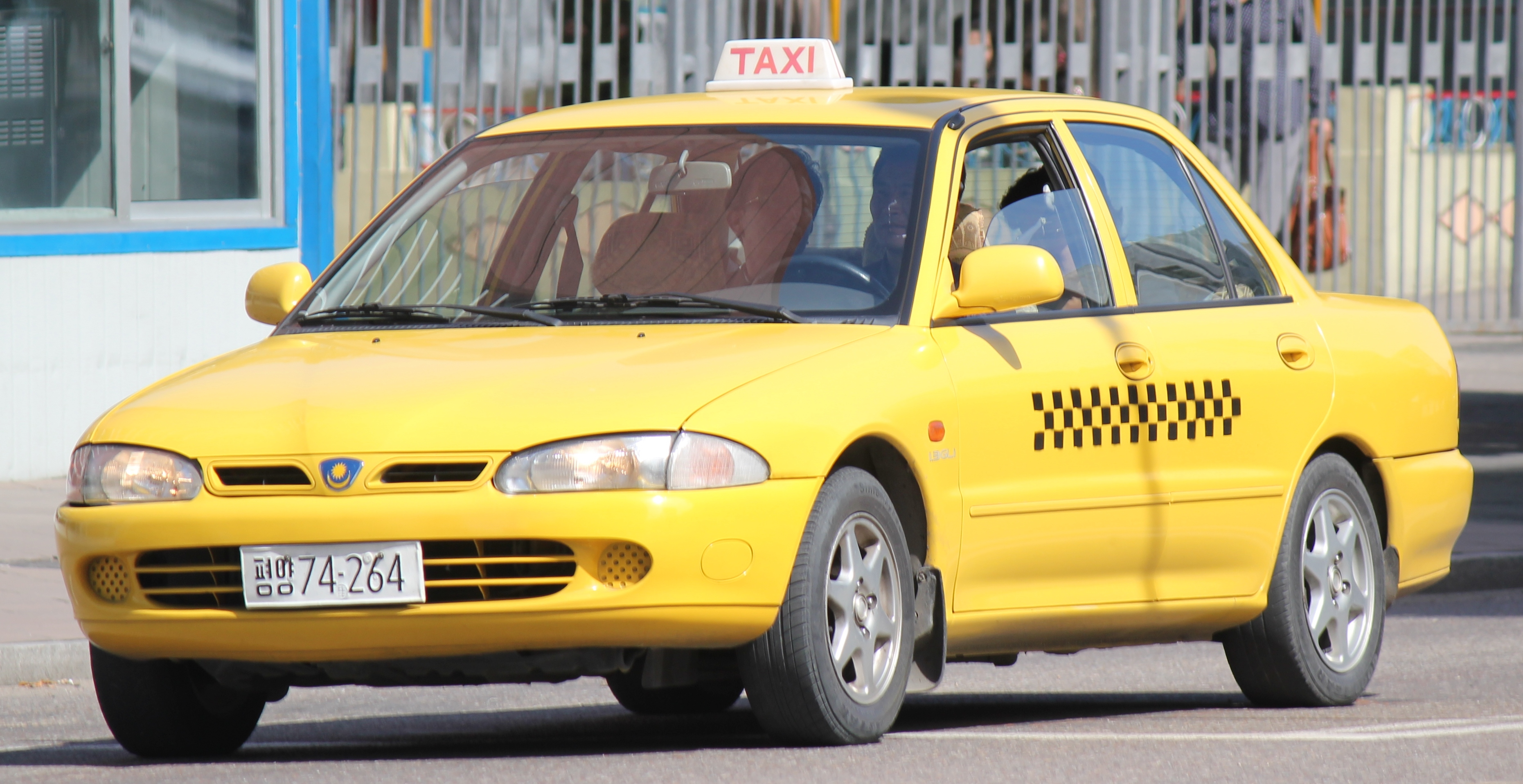
A Proton Wira yellow taxi in Pyongyang.

== Railways ==
The Korean State Railway is the only rail operator in North Korea. It has a network of over 6,000 kilometres (3,700 mi) of standard gauge and 400 kilometres (250 mi) of narrow gauge (762 mm or 30.0 in) lines; as of 2007, over 5,400 kilometres (3,400 mi) of the standard gauge (well over 80%), along with 295.5 kilometres (183.6 mi) of the narrow gauge lines are electrified. The narrow gauge segment runs in the Haeju peninsula.

Because of lack of maintenance on the rail infrastructure and vehicles, the travel time by rail is increasing. It has been reported that the 190-kilometre (120 mi) trip from Pyongyang to Kaesong can take up to six hours.

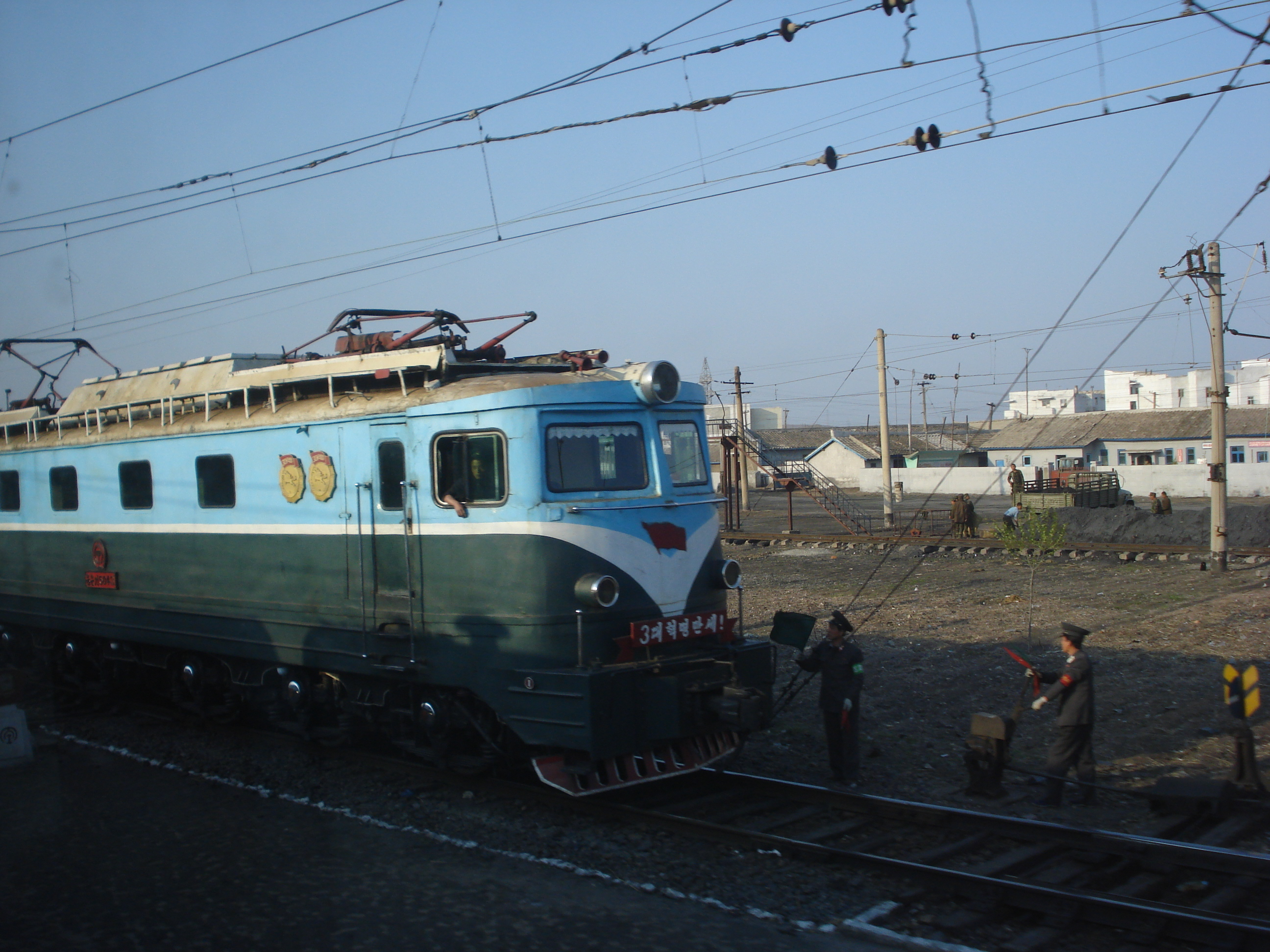
Red Flag 1 class locomotive

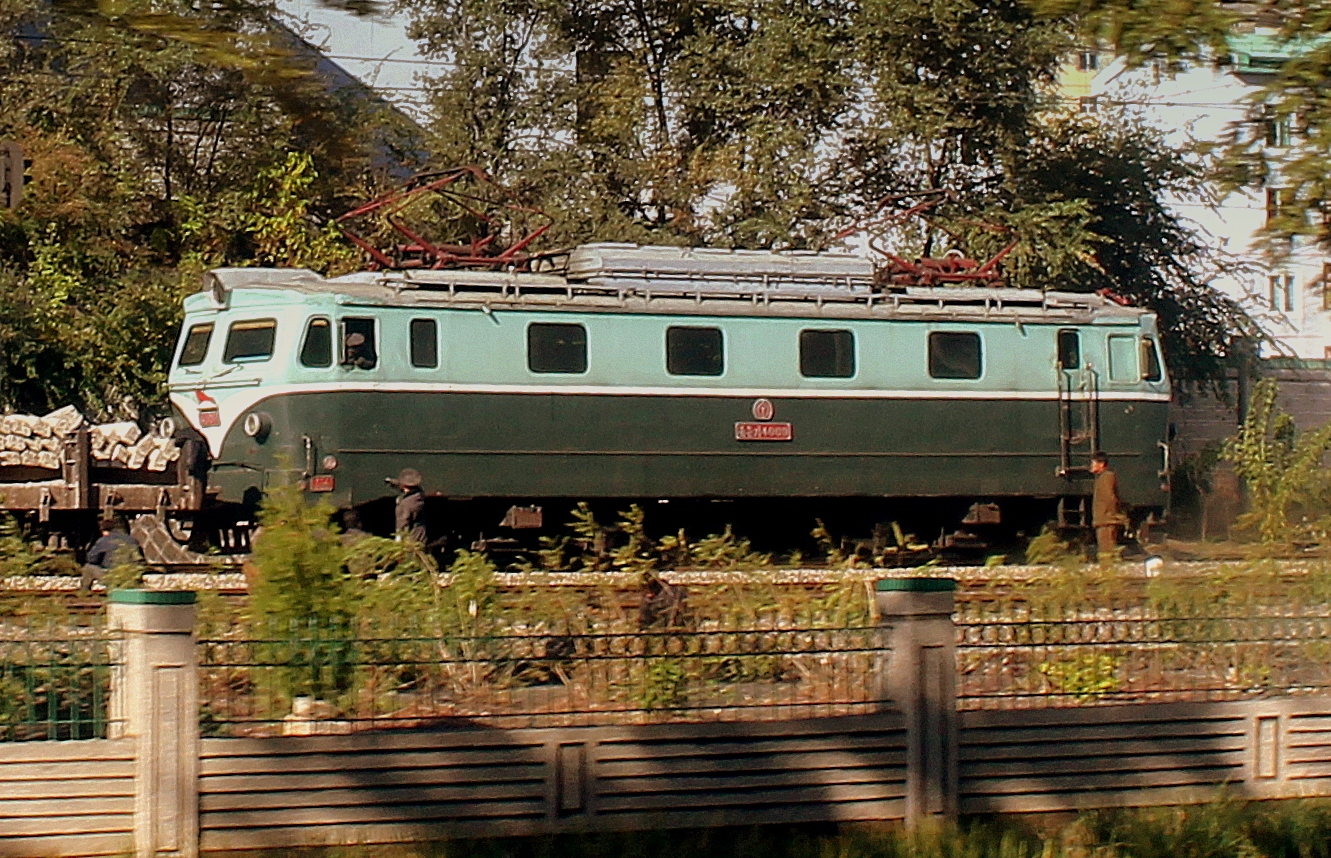
Red Flag 2 Class locomotive in Pyongyang

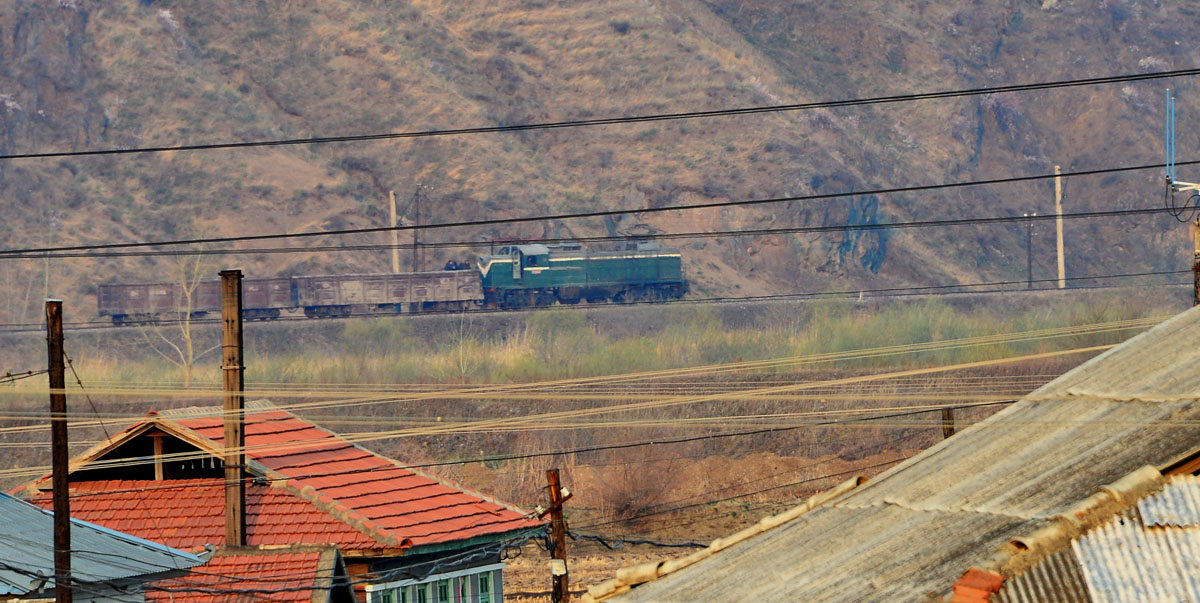
TGM3 train on the Hambuk Line, Hauling cargo

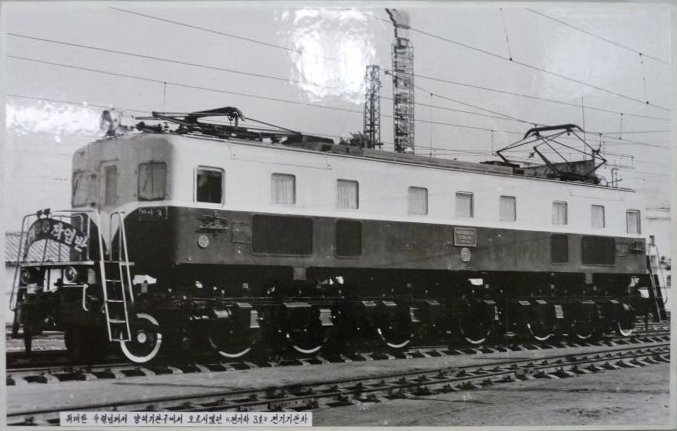
Chŏngiha class locomotive. These locomotives remained operational from 1956 to ~2011

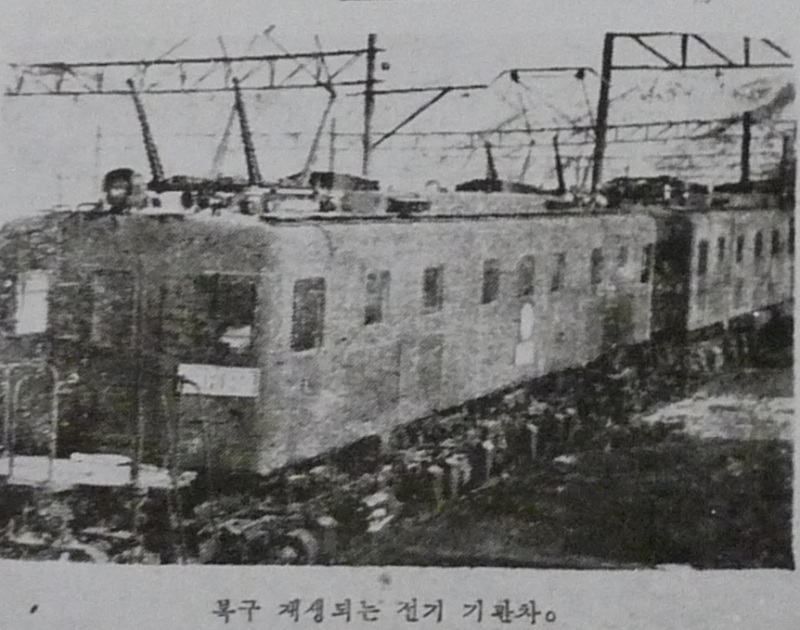
Chŏngidu class locomotive. They were operational since 1956

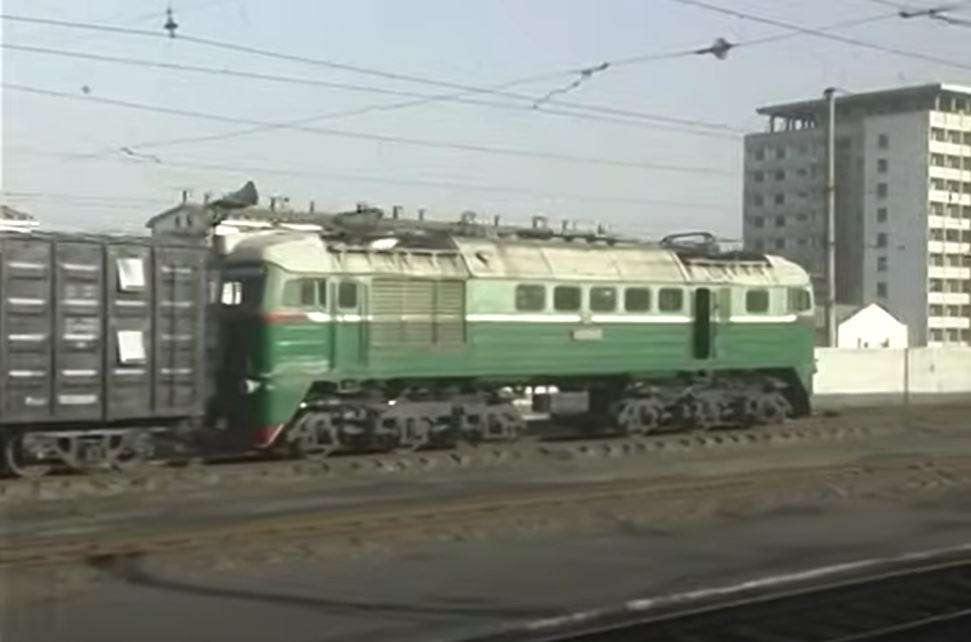
Kanghaenggun Class Locomotive

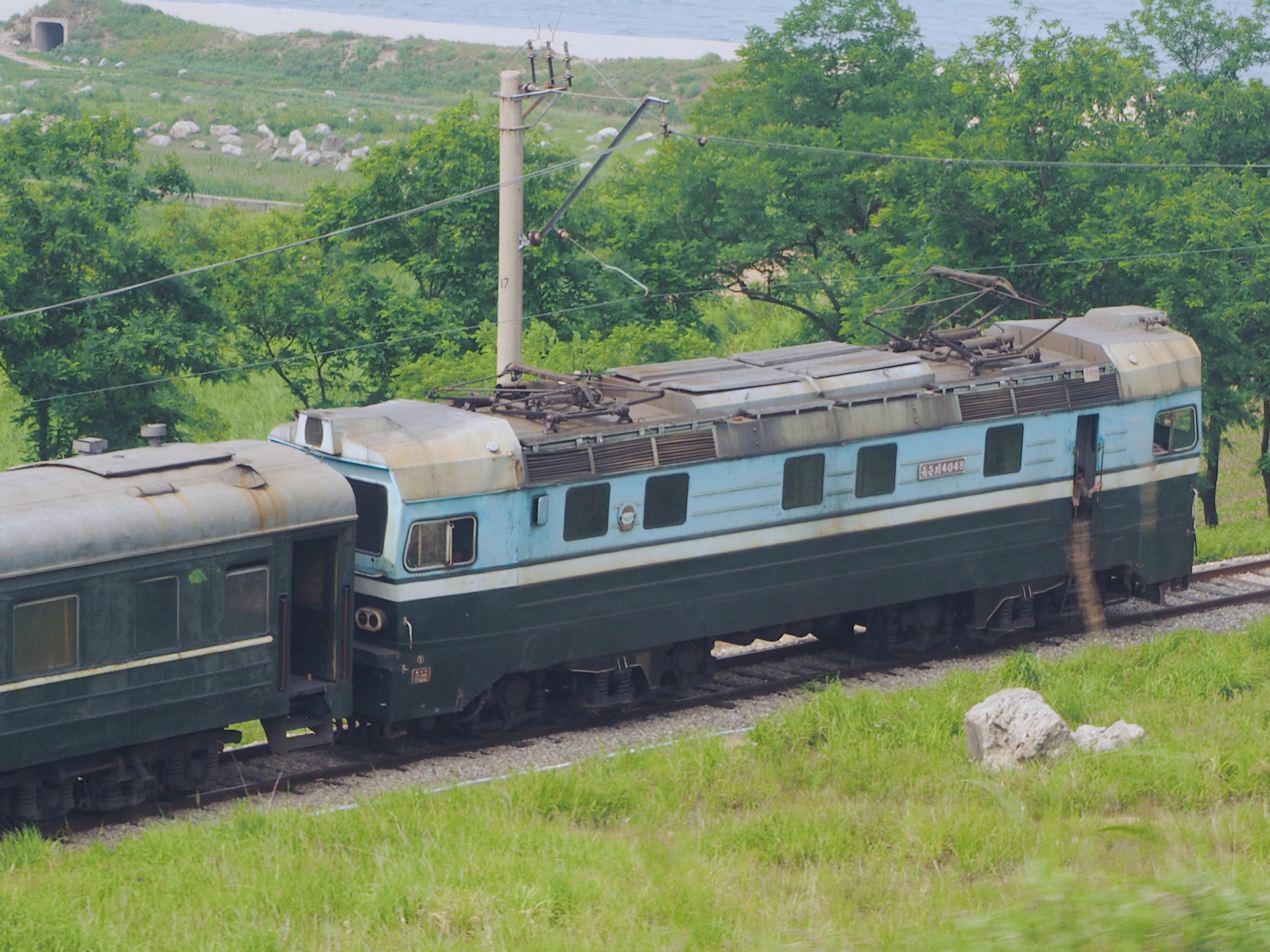
Ch'ŏngnyŏnjŏl Kinyŏm-class locomotive near Wonsan

== Water transport ==
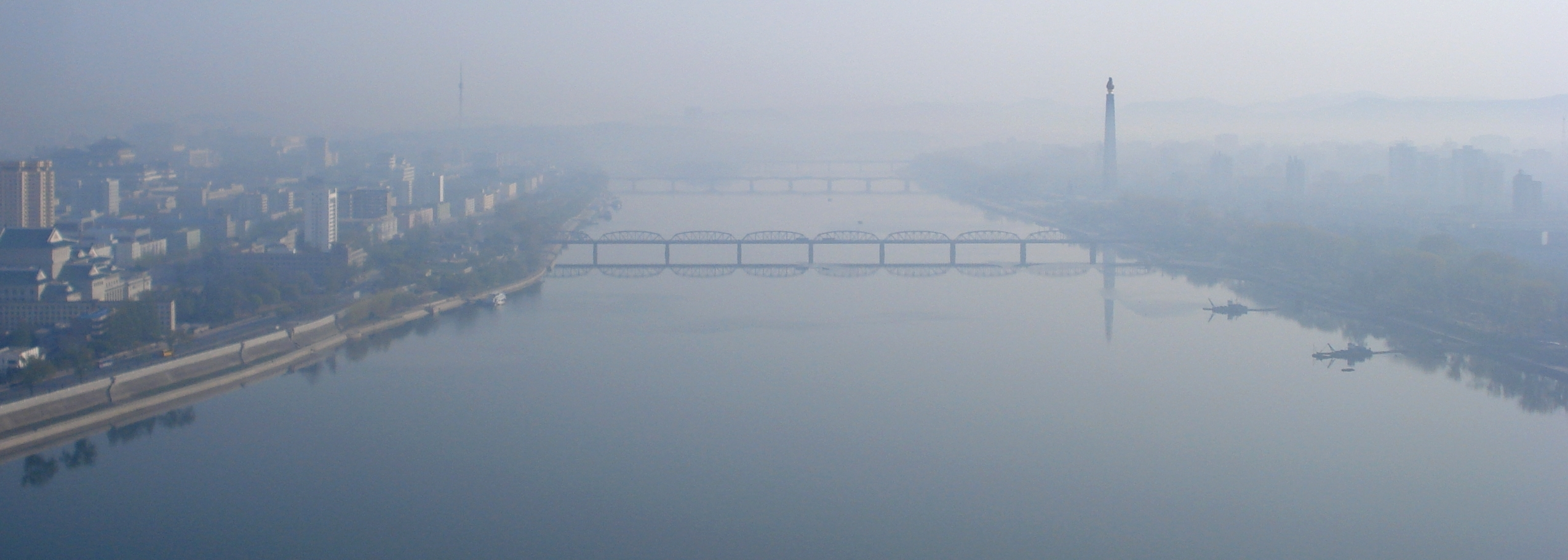
Taedong River in Pyongyang

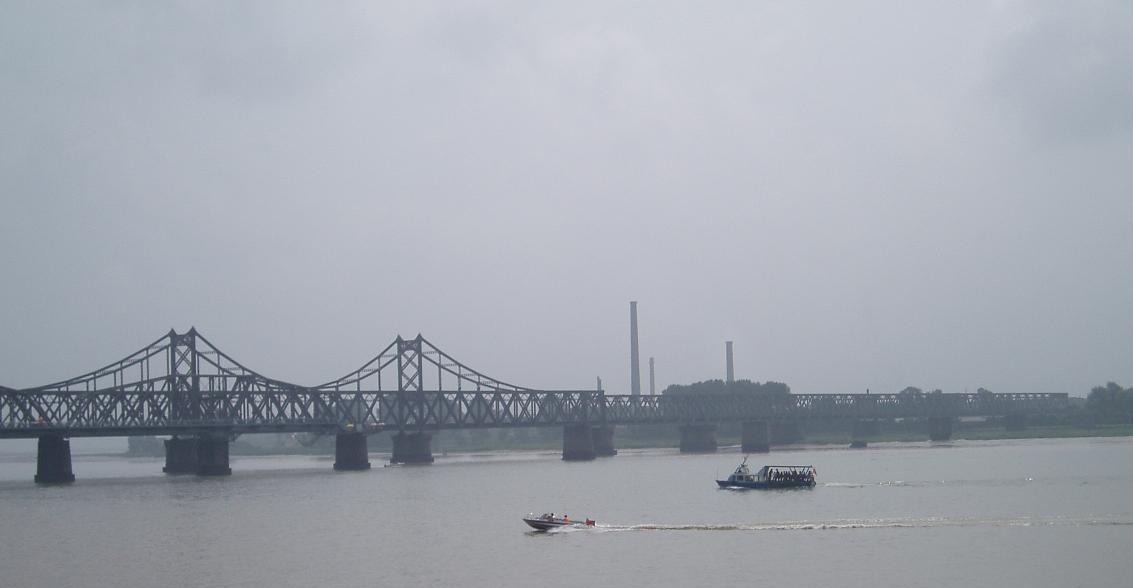
Yalu River near Sinuiju

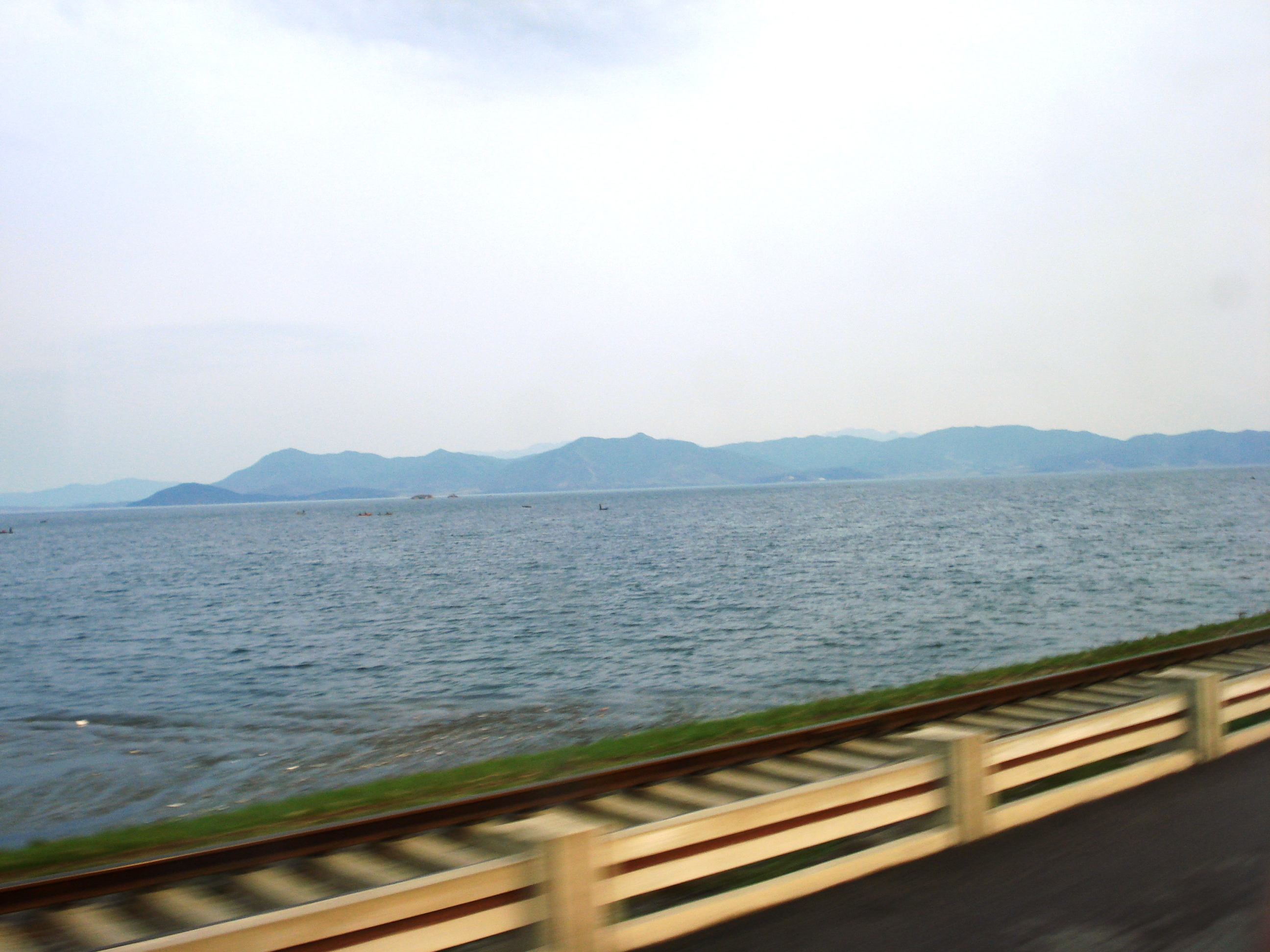
Nampo

Water transport on the major rivers and along the coasts plays a growing role in freight and passenger traffic. Except for the Yalu and Taedong rivers, most of the inland waterways, totaling 2,250 kilometres (1,400 mi), are navigable only by small boats. Coastal traffic is heaviest on the eastern seaboard, whose deeper waters can accommodate larger vessels. The major ports are Nampo on the west coast and Rajin, Chongjin, Wonsan, and Hamhung on the east coast. The country's harbor loading capacity in the 1990s was estimated at almost 35 million tons a year. There is a continuing investment in upgrading and expanding port facilities, developing transportation—particularly on the Taedong River—and increasing the share of international cargo by domestic vessels.

=== List of ports in North Korea ===
- Chongjin
- Haeju
- Hamhung
- Kimchaek
- Kaesong
- Nampo
- Rasŏn/Najin/Rajin-guyok
- Sinuiju
- Sonbong (formerly Unggi)
- Songnim
- Ungsang
- Wonsan

=== Merchant marine ===
In the early 1990s, North Korea possessed an oceangoing merchant fleet, largely domestically produced, of 68 ships (of at least 1,000 gross-registered tons), totalling 465,801 gross-registered tons (709,442 tonnes deadweight (DWT)), which included 58 cargo ships and two tankers. As of 2008, this has increased to a total of 167 vessels consisting mainly of cargo and tanker ships.

Fleet by type	Number
Total	167
Bulk carrier	11
Cargo	121
Carrier	1
Chemical tanker	4
Container	3
Cargo liner	3
Petroleum tanker	19
Reefer ship	4
Roll on/Roll off	1

== Ferry Service ==
North Korea maintains the Man Gyong Bong 92, a ferry connecting Rajin and Vladivostok, Russia.

== Air transport ==
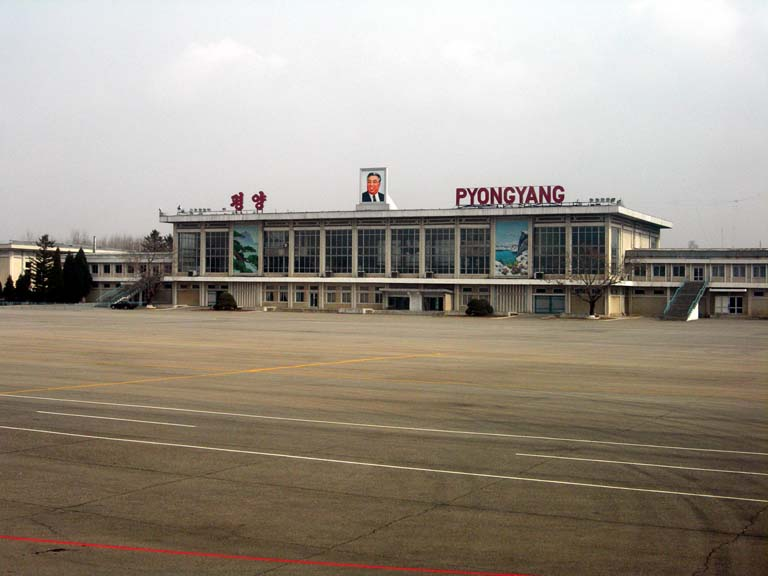
Pyongyang Sunan International Airport

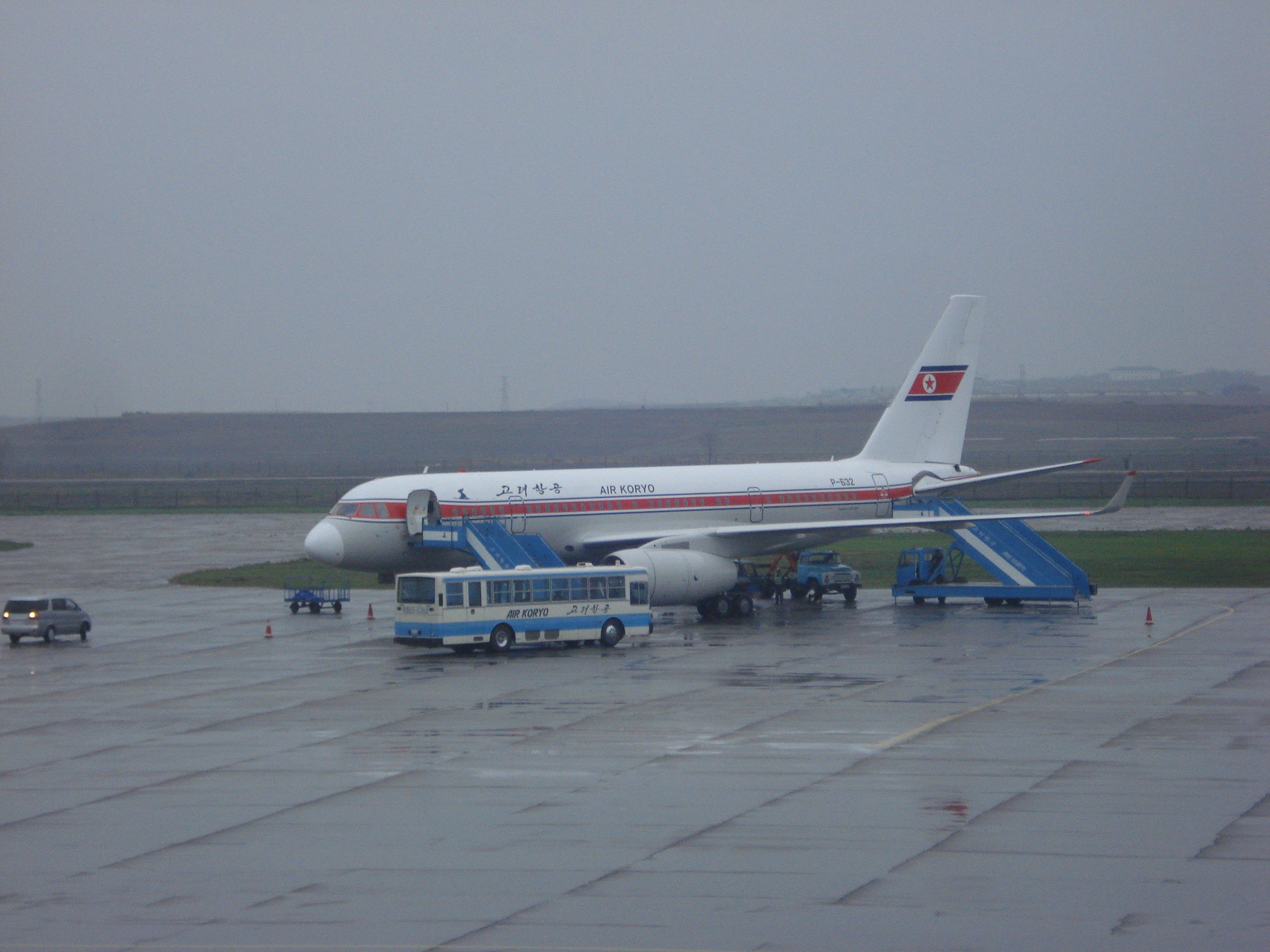
Air Koryo Tupolev Tu-204

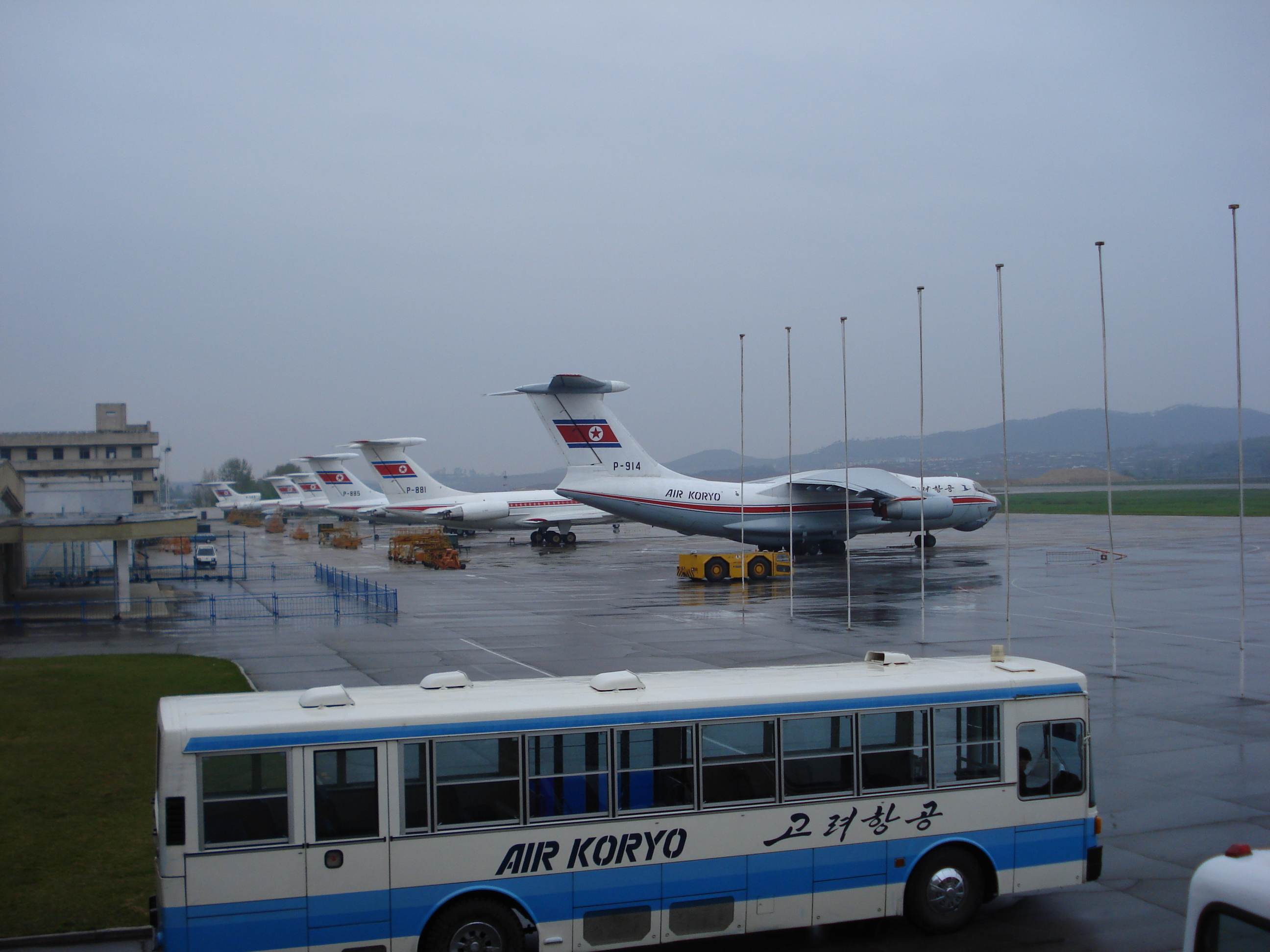
Pyongyang Sunan International Airport ramp

North Korea's international air connections are limited in frequency and numbers. As of 2011, scheduled flights operate only from Pyongyang's Pyongyang Sunan International Airport to Beijing, Shenyang, and Vladivostok. Charters to other destinations operate as per demand. Prior to 1995, many routes to Eastern Europe were operated, including services to Sofia, Belgrade, Prague, and Budapest, among others. Since July 2025, Nordwind Airlines connects Pyongyang to Moscow-Sheremetyevo.

Air Koryo is the country's national airline and operates all civil aircraft in the country; it has a fleet of 19 passenger and cargo aircraft, all of which are Soviet or more modern Russian types. As of 2017, Air China also operates flights between Beijing and Pyongyang.

Internal flights are available between Pyongyang, Hamhung, Haeju (HAE), Hungnam (HGM), Kaesong (KSN), Kanggye, Kilju, Najin (NJN), Nampo (NAM), Sinuiju (SII), Samjiyon, Wonsan (WON), Songjin (SON), and Chongjin (CHO).

As of 2013, the CIA estimates that North Korea has 82 usable airports, 39 of which have permanent-surface runways.

Airports – with paved runways	Number
Total	39
> 3,047 metres (9,997 ft)	3
2,438 metres (7,999 ft) to 3,047 metres (9,997 ft)	22
1,524 metres (5,000 ft) to 2,437 metres (7,995 ft)	8
914 metres (2,999 ft) to 1,523 metres (4,997 ft)	2
< 914 metres (2,999 ft)	4

Airports – with unpaved runways	Number
Total	43
2,438 metres (7,999 ft) to 3,047 metres (9,997 ft)	3
1,524 metres (5,000 ft) to 2,437 metres (7,995 ft)	17
914 metres (2,999 ft) to 1,523 metres (4,997 ft)	15
< 914 metres (2,999 ft)	8

It was reported that North Korean air traffic controllers had been cut off from the international global satellite communications network in 2017 because North Korea had not made the required payments. Traffic controllers at Pyongyang Sunan International Airport had to use conventional telephone lines to inform their counterparts at Incheon International Airport that the flight containing North Korean delegates to the 2018 Winter Olympic Games in South Korea had taken off.

== Automotives ==
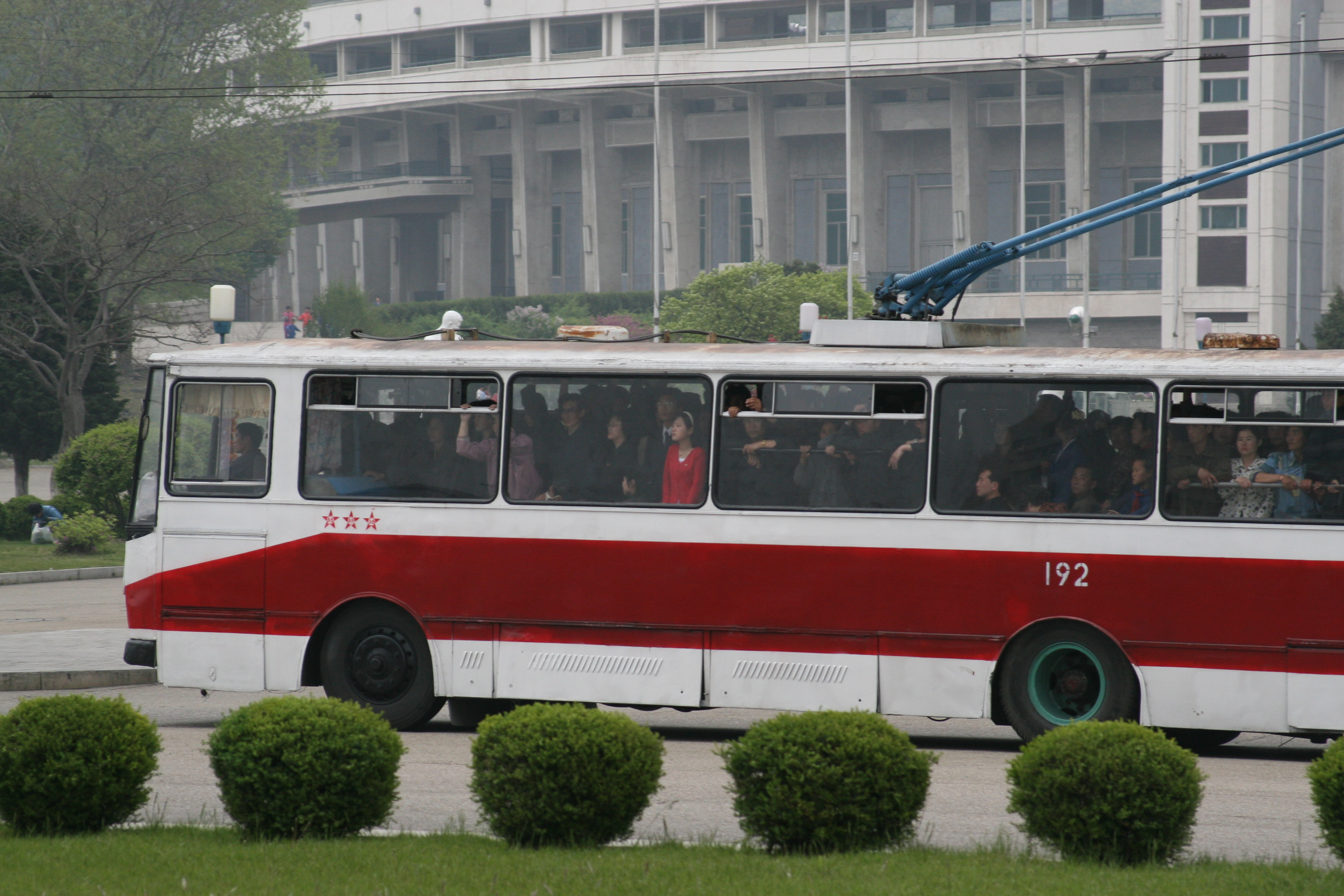
A trolleybus in Pyongyang with three distance stars, indicating it has gone over at least 150,000 kilometres (93,000 mi) safely.

Road vehicles in North Korea bear distance stars. These are paint markings which display how far the particular vehicle has traveled without incident. Each star represents 50,000 kilometres (31,000 mi) travelled without an accident.

The DPRK license plate background color denotes the vehicle type;

- Blue - Government issued vehicle
- Black - Military vehicle
- Yellow - Private vehicle for permitted persons who have contributed greatly to DPRK
- Green - Diplomatic
- Red - Non-governmental Organizations (NGO)

Automobile transportation has historically been restricted by a series of regulations. According to North Korean exile Kim Ji-ho, unless a civilian driver receives a special permit, it was forbidden to drive alone (the driver must carry passengers). Other civilian permits are a military mobilization permit (to transport soldiers in times of war), a certificate of driver training (to be renewed every year), a fuel validity document (a certificate confirming that the fuel was purchased from an authorized source), and a mechanical certificate (to prove that the car is in working order).

In October 2024 and January 2025, revisions to the Private Car Utilization Law introduced detailed procedures for individuals to own automobiles in the country. The new law guarantees personal ownership of private cars and legally protects inheritance rights, making it possible to pass down vehicles to relatives, though they cannot privately sell their vehicles to others, unless they are married or directly related and restricts the lending of vehicles to immediate family members. The law stipulates that only government-certified institutions can sell private cars at prices set by the state through designated dealerships and limits ownership to one car per household. It also prohibits usage of private cars for commercial purposes. The revised laws led to a boom in the yellow category private car ownership, which was previously permitted persons who have contributed greatly to North Korea. Sales of cars has increased in North Korea, especially in the capital Pyongyang, driven by imports of Chinese automotives rebadged with North Korean manufacturer labels. Growing vehicle traffic in the 2020s, especially in Pyongyang, led to increased pollution.

== See also ==
- Tourism in North Korea
- Urban planning in communist countries
