= Tokchon =

Tŏkch'ŏn 덕천
- Municipal City

Korean transcription(s)
  - Chosŏn'gŭl: 덕천시
  - Hancha: 德川市
  - McCune–Reischauer: Tŏkch'ŏn-si
  - Revised Romanization: Deokcheon-si
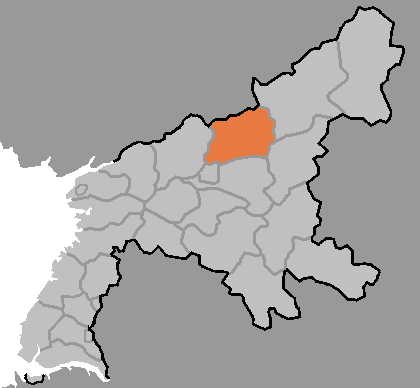
- Map of South Pyongan showing the location of Tokchon

- Location within North Korea
- Coordinates: 39°45′40″N 126°18′43″E
- Country: North Korea
- Province: South P'yŏngan
- Administrative divisions: 22 tong, 10 ri

Population (2008)
  - Total: 237,133
  - Dialect: P'yŏngan
- Time zone: UTC+9 (Pyongyang Time)

Tŏkch'ŏn (Korean pronunciation: [tʌk̚.tsʰʌn]) is a si, or city, in northern South P'yŏngan province, North Korea. It is bordered by Nyŏngwŏn and Maengsan to the east, Kujang county in North P'yŏngan province to the north, Kaech'ŏn to the west and Pukch'ang to the south. It was known as Tokugawa during Japanese rule.

== History ==
A 1984 survey unearthed fragmented pieces of pottery about 3km north of the Tokchon city limits dating from the Juelmun pottery period. However, little is known about the founding of the current city of Tokchon. The earliest records of Tokchon point to a Goryeo period founding of around with scriptures mentioning a fort named Bajung (바중) owned by a local lord c.950 A.D. The city was only named the current Tokchon during the Choson period (1392–1897). The city was heavily bombed by the USAF in the Korean War, with estimates of 65% of the city destroyed and 15–25,000 killed. On April 28, 2017, a Hwasong-12 intermediate-range ballistic missile launched from near Pukchang Airport reportedly crashed into Ch'ŏngsin-dong, Tokchon, damaging several structures in the city.

== Administrative divisions ==
Tŏkch'ŏn-si is divided into 22 tong (neighbourhoods) and 10 ri (villages):

- Chenam-dong (제남동)
- Ch'angmal-dong (창말동)
- Ch'angsang-dong (창상동)
- Ch'ŏngsin-dong (청신동)
- Ch'ŏngsong-dong (청송동)
- Hŭngdŏk-tong (흥덕동)
- Hyŏngbong-dong (형봉동)
- Kangan-dong (강안동)
- Namdŏk-tong (남덕동)
- Namsan-dong (남산동)
- Osan-dong (오산동)
- Samt'an-dong (삼탄동)
- Sangdŏk-tong (상덕동)
- Sangsin-dong (상신동)
- Sinhŭng-dong (신흥동)
- Sŏmun-dong (서문동)
- Songwŏn-dong (송원동)
- Sŭngri-dong (승리동)
- Tŏksŏng-dong (덕성동)
- Ŭndŏk-tong (은덕동)
- Wŏlbong-dong (월봉동)
- Yŏkchŏn-dong (역전동)
- Andong-ri (안동리)
- Changdong-ri (장동리)
- Kujang-ri (구장리)
- Much'ang-ri (무창리)
- Namyang-ri (남양리)
- P'unggong-ri (풍곡리)
- Samhŭng-ri (삼흥리)
- Sinp'ung-ri (신풍리)
- Sinsŏng-ri (신성리)
- Unhŭng-ri (운흥리)

== Economy ==
The Sŭngri Motor Plant (with associated workshops) has been one of the few domestic sources of both low-cost replicas of foreign passenger cars and military-service trucks in North Korea since it was established in 1950, and developed through the massive militarization campaigns of Kim Il Sung in the 1970s and 80s.

However, the total depletion of foreign credit by the end of the 1980s caused the manufacturing industry to implode; the supply of steel for metalworking at Sŭngri slowed to a trickle, and even when available, the production lines had regular power outages. The severe famine in the countryside also caused an exodus of starving peasants to the cities, further straining food supplies and worker productivity. 20,000 cars and trucks were made in Tŏkch'ŏn in 1980; by 1996 the number was just 150, all of which were Army trucks, some later modified as rocket artillery launchers.

== Transportation ==
Tŏkch'ŏn-si is served by the Korean State Railway's P'yŏngdŏk line and five branchlines.

== See also ==
- List of secondary subdivisions of North Korea
- Geography of North Korea
- South Pyongan
