= List of CB slang =

Citizens Band slang

CB slang is the anti-language, argot, or cant which developed among users of Citizens Band radio (CB), especially truck drivers in the United States during the 1970s and early 1980s, when it was an important part of the culture of the trucking industry.

Nicknames or call signs given or adopted by CB radio users are known as "handles". Many truck drivers will call each other "Hand," or by the name of the company for which they drive.

CB and its associated slang emerged in the United States but were then exported to other countries including Mexico, Germany, and Canada.

== List of terms ==
=== Law enforcement officers, equipment, and locations ===
List of law enforcement–related CB slang
Term	Description
Baby bear/ Bear cub	A rookie police officer.
Bear	A police officer. (See "Smokey" below)
Bear bite/Invitation	A speeding ticket.
Bear cave/Bear's den	A police station.
Bear in the air	A police officer in some form of aircraft (see "Eye in the sky").
Bear rolling discos	A speeding police car with its lights flashing.
Bear trap	Radar or speed trap.
Bear with ears	A police officer monitoring the CB airwaves.
Blue light special	A police vehicle with its blue strobe lights flashing (from the popular Kmart sale gimmick).
Checkpoint Charlie	Police checkpoint placed to look for intoxicated drivers, drivers with invalid licenses, etc. (alludes to the former border crossing between East and West Berlin).
Chicken coop/Chicken house	A scale house (truck scale), or the weigh station where they are found.
Cop-ulating	A collaborative task force of multiple agencies and/or jurisdictions conducting a checkpoint, speed enforcement or other targeted "sting" operation.
County mountie	A county sheriff or deputy.
DOT	Department of Transportation enforcement vehicle.
Dope Dog	Dog used to find illegal drugs on and/ or in vehicles, personnel, especially drivers. Seen when a bust is going on/ US border crossings, other places. Some call them "Flea Bags".
Eaten by a bear	A truck driver caught by a police officer for speeding or another safety infraction.
Evel Knievel	Police officer on a motorcycle (refers to the popular motorcycle stuntman).
Eye in the sky	Police aircraft, airplane or helicopter.
Flying doughnut	A police helicopter.
Fox in the hen house/Smokey in a plain wrapper	An unmarked police vehicle.
Full-grown bear	A state police trooper.
Gumball machine/Bubble gum machine	Police vehicle, especially one with the older-style, dome-shaped red rotating/strobe light commonly mounted on the roof of police cars, which resembles a traditional "penny" gumball machine.
Hit/Hitting the jackpot	A motorist or trucker pulled over by law enforcement. Refers to the siren lights on top of a police cruiser, resembling the bright lights on a casino slot machine.
Honey bear	A more endearing term for a female police officer.
Kojak with a Kodak	A police officer running Radar.
Local yokel	A local city police officer.
Mama bear	A less derogatory term for a female police officer.
Miss Piggy	A female police officer (refers to the Muppet character, derived from the pejorative term "pig" for police officers).
Mountie mountie	A member of the Royal Canadian Mounted Police.
Papa bear	A male police officer or police supervisor such as Sergeant or higher rank.
Polar bear	A white unmarked police vehicle.
Smokey	A police officer (refers to Smokey Bear, known for wearing a campaign hat very similar to that included in many highway patrol uniforms in the United States; origin of Smokey and the Bandit movie title).
Smokey with a customer	A driver getting busted by a police officer and being issued a ticket.
Starsky and Hutch	Police officers (refers to the 1970s American action television series Starsky & Hutch).
Sunoco special	A New York state trooper. Named for the blue-and-yellow vehicle color scheme which resembled Sunoco gas stations.
Super trooper	State police trooper.
Taco stand	Border patrol stations on the Mexico–United States border.
Wall-to-wall bears	A large number of police vehicles, especially when on a chase.

=== Trucks and other vehicles ===
List of trucks and other vehicles CB slang
Term	Description
18/18 wheeler	A truck with a total of 18 tire/wheels. It can also be used for any truck usually with a fifth-wheel hitch and a semi-trailer even if the vehicle doesn't have dual wheels, or tandem axles.
Aircraft carrier	Tractor/trailer carrying a disassembled aircraft, helicopter or a small plane.
Angry kangaroo	A truck with one (or both) of its headlights out.
Big truck	Generally, a truck able to pull a semi-trailer, usually with the trailer and not a bob-tail. It can mean any vehicle Class 7 or heavier.
Blinkin winkin/Kiddie car	School bus.
Bulldog	A Mack road tractor, noted for its trademark bulldog hood ornament (origin in World War I when British soldiers called the Mack AC "The Bulldog", giving the name and trademark hood ornament to Mack).
Bullfrog	An ABF truck.
Bull hauler	A livestock hauler that is empty (for a loaded one see Go Go Girls).
Bobtail rig/Bobtail	Road tractor driving without a trailer.
Bumper sticker	Vehicle following too close (tailgating).
Buster Brown	UPS truck.
Cab-over	A truck where the cab sits directly over the engine. Much less common in North America since the overall length law changed in 1976.
Camper	A motorhome or a travel trailer. Some of these are like a literal house and may have Satellite TV access, even access to the Internet. Usually used as a temporary place to stay while travelling. Also known as a Recreational Vehicle.
Cash box	A toll booth.
Chicken truck	A dressed up and fancy truck. Usually means extra chrome, wide front bumper, extra light, etc. Can also mean a fast truck. Does not mean a truck hauling chickens.
Coal bucket	Truck with a trailer for hauling coal, especially an end-dump trailer.
Container	An intermodal shipping container. Refers to a cargo container that goes overseas, get loaded onto a train, or get placed on a truck chassis.
Convict Wagon	A Dept. Of Corrections vehicle, usually a white or other colored bus that has Dept. Of Corrections insignia on it, cages in it for prisoner transport to either jail or prison.
Corn flake	A Consolidated Freightways truck.
Cornbinder/Thirteen letter shit spreader	A Navistar International or International Harvester truck.
Covered wagon	A trailer with a tarp.
Doubles	Refers to a double set of trailers.
Draggin' wagon/A wrecker	A tow truck.
Dry van	A trailer without a refrigeration unit or insulation.
Drop and hook	The process of dropping off a trailer and picking up a replacement trailer at a destination.
Dung beetle	A Volkswagen Beetle with a male driver.
Fender bender	An accident (now widely used among the general public).
Freightshaker	A Freightliner truck.
Four wheeler	Any vehicle with only four wheels. Most often used for personal cars/vans/SUVs.
Four wheeler with a tag	Any vehicle with only four wheels pulling a trailer. Most often used for personal cars/vans/SUVs.
Go-go girls (on the dance floor)	A livestock truck, preferably hauling pigs or cows.
Green machine	A military vehicle.
Hood	A conventional road tractor, with the engine in front of the cab.
Jimmy	A GMC road tractor.
Juice box	A tanker hauling perishable liquids preferably juice concentrate to a processing plant.
K-Whopper	A Kenworth road tractor.
Large Car	Slang for classic-style, long-hooded semi-trucks like the Kenworth W900 and Peterbilt 379
Louisville	A Ford L-Series truck.
Meat wagon	An ambulance.
Milk bottle	A milk tanker.
Boiler/Pete/Petercar	A Peterbilt road tractor.
Pigtails	The cables that supply air and power to a trailer.
Piggy back	A truck towing another truck.
Piggy bank	An armored car.
Portable barn	A livestock truck.
Portable parking lot/Rolling parking lot	A tractor/trailer loaded with new or used cars, a car carrier trailer.
Pregnant roller skate	A Volkswagen Beetle.
Pumpkin/Pumpkin roller	A Schneider National tractor/trailer.
Reefer	A refrigerated trailer or flatbed trailer hauling a refrigerated container.
Roach Coach	A small to moderately sized truck built as a portable restaurant seen at construction sites, carnivals, fairs, etc. to serve public at large as a restaurant or diner.
Rolling refinery	A tanker truck, typically carrying fuel.
Salt shaker	A highway department truck for spreading ice melting chemicals on the road, traditionally salt.
Scanny	A Scania AB truck. There are around 500 in the United States. It is very rare, so it is used only in social media (truck pages in Facebook, YouTube, etc.).
Skateboard	A straight, flatbed trailer.
Star car/Big W	A Western Star road tractor.
Super chickens	A YRC tractor/trailer.
Thermos bottle	A road tractor with a chemical trailer.
Tornado Tracker/TIV	Special vehicle seen in areas where tornadoes/ severe thunderstorms are located. Other vehicles may be modified cars, while some trucks have a rotating Doppler radar unit on it. All are used to track severe thunderstorms, tornadoes.
Turkey hearse	A truck with a load of turkeys headed for slaughter.
Twin Screw	A dual-axle drive semi truck
Wiggle wagon	A road tractor with more than one trailer.
Yard dog, yard goat, yard horse or mule	A terminal tractor used to move trailers in a shipping/freight yard.

=== Locations and regions ===
List of locations and regions CB slang
Term	Description
ATL / Big A / Hotlanta	Atlanta, Georgia (now widely used among the general public).
Beantown	Boston, Massachusetts (now widely used among the general public).
Beer Town	Milwaukee, Wisconsin.
Berta	Alberta.
Big Apple	New York, New York (now widely used among the general public).
Bingo / Bingotown	Binghamton, New York.
Big D / Emerald City	Dallas, Texas (now widely used among the general public in North Texas).
The Bubbly	Champaign, Illinois.
Chocolate Town	Hershey, Pennsylvania (reference to Hershey's Chocolate's; now widely used among the general public)
Choo Choo Town / Tow City / Chatty	Chattanooga, Tennessee (after the song "Chattanooga Choo-Choo") (in reference to Miller Industries and being the birthplace of the tow truck).
Corn patch	The Midwest.
The Coq	The Coquihalla Highway in British Columbia.
Cow Town	Fort Worth, Texas, or Calgary, Alberta.
Crashville	Nashville, Tennessee.
Derby City / Derby Town	Louisville, Kentucky.
The Dime	Interstate 10
The Quarter	Interstate 25
Disney Town	Anaheim, California.
Flagtown	Flagstaff, Arizona.
Flower City	Rochester, New York.
Flying Hook	Flying J truckstop chain.
Fort God	Memphis, Tennessee.
Gateway / Arch Town / The Big Arch	St. Louis, Missouri.
Ghost Town	Casper, Wyoming.
Guitar Town	Nashville, Tennessee.
Gunspoint	Greenspoint (an area of Houston, Texas).
Hippie Haven / Bat City / Waterloo	Austin, Texas.
Hog Town	Toronto, Ontario.
Space City / H-Town / Astrodome / The Oil Patch	Houston, Texas. (reference to the oil industry, Johnson Space Center, and the Houston Astrodome)
Indy 500 / Indy 5	Indianapolis, Indiana (reference to Indianapolis Motor Speedway home of the Indy 500).
Idiot Island	California.
The Ike Highway	Interstate 80 from San Francisco to Cheyenne, Wyoming; Interstate 25 from Cheyenne to Denver; and Interstate 70 from Denver to Baltimore as shown on signs saying Dwight D. Eisenhower Highway.
J-ville / JAX	Jacksonville, Florida
Job Town	Clinton, New Jersey.
Little Cuba	Miami, Florida.
Lost Wages / Sin City / Dice Town / Gambling Town	Las Vegas, Nevada.
Mardi Gras / Crescent City	New Orleans, Louisiana.
Miamuh	Miami, Florida (traditional local pronunciation)
Mickey Mouse	Orlando, Florida (a reference to Walt Disney World resort).
Mile High	Denver, Colorado (now widely used among the general public as "The Mile High City").
Monkey Town	Montgomery, Alabama ('Monkey' being diminutive form of 'Montgomery').
Motor City	Detroit, Michigan (now widely used among the general public).
Mouse Town	Orlando, Florida (referring to Disney World)
Nickel Road	Interstate 5.
The Pokey	Pocatello, Idaho.
Queen City	Charlotte, North Carolina, Cincinnati, Ohio, or Buffalo, New York.
Quarterback	Interstate 25.
Red Stick	Baton Rouge, Louisiana.
Rhymes with Fun	Regina, Saskatchewan.
Ripoff Griffin's	Rip Griffin's, a well known truck stop outside Dallas.
Rock City	Little Rock, Arkansas.
Salty	Salt Lake City, Utah (a reference to the Great Salt Lake)
Shakey City or Shakeytown	California or Los Angeles specifically (a reference to the frequency and severity of earthquakes).
Silly Circle	The Capital Beltway, a beltway around Washington, D.C., running through Virginia and Maryland.
Spaghetti Bowl	A mass of interconnecting bridges that pass overhead, even under other bridges in a manner similar to a bowl of spaghetti. They are often found as part of large interchanges in and around large cities. As referred to by the general public, spaghetti junctions include the original Spaghetti Junction in England, Malfunction Junction, MacArthur Maze, Jane Byrne Interchange, Can of Worms, Mixing Bowl, etc.
Stack of Bricks	A house or home ("I'm heading back to my stack of bricks").
Steam Town	Scranton, Pennsylvania.
Steel City	Pittsburgh, Pennsylvania (now widely used among the general public).
The Sticker Patch	Phoenix, Arizona (a reference to the cacti in the area).
Spud Town	Boise, Idaho.
T Town	Texarkana, Texas / Arkansas / Tulsa, Oklahoma.
Tonto	Toronto, Ontario.
Taco Town / Alamo City	San Antonio, Texas.
UFO Central	Roswell, New Mexico, Nevada State Route 375, and Area 51 or any area where UFOs have supposedly been sighted.
Windy City	Chicago, Illinois (now widely used among the general public).

=== Ten-codes and other popular terms ===
List of ten-codes and other popular CB slang
Term	Description
4-10	A reversal of the ten code "10-4," when asking if someone agrees with something said or if one's transmission was received. ("That was a nasty wreck. Four-ten?")
5 by 5	Indicates that another CB user can be heard clearly (see "Wall to wall and treetop tall").
10-4	Acknowledged; can also be used to denote or emphasize an agreement ("That's a big 10-4.").
10-6	Busy; stand by.
10-7	Signing off.
10-8	En route. ("I'm 10-8 to your location.")
10-9	Last transmission not received; repeat your last transmission.
10-10	CB user will cease broadcasting but will continue to listen. ("I'm 10-10 on the side.")
10-20	Denotes location, as in identifying one's location ("My 20 is on Main Street and First"), asking the receiver what their current location or immediate destination is ("What's your 20?"), or inquiring about the location of a third person ("OK, people, I need a 20 on Little Timmy and fast").
10-32	Radio check or test.
10-33	Emergency traffic, clear the channel. CB code for Mayday for trucks and police cars.
3s and 8s	Well wishes to a fellow driver. Borrowed from amateur radio telegraphy codes "73" (best regards) and "88" (hugs and kisses).
10-36	The correct time ("Can I get a 10-36?").
10-41	Driver is signing on or changed the channel on their radio.
10-42	An accident on the road.
10 in the wind	Listening to the CB while driving (also known as "10-10 in the wind").
10-70	A fire.
10-77/10-double-7	No or negative, often said with intensity.
10-100	Restroom break.
10-200	Police needed at ________. (In the trucking-themed movie Smokey and the Bandit, a character jokingly plays off this usage, saying that 10-100 is better than 10-200, meaning that 10-100 was peeing and 10-200 was doing a #2).
20	Abbreviation of "10-20."
Affirmative	Yes.
Alabama chrome	Duct tape.
Alligator station	A user who talks constantly and seldom listens (comic reference to an alligator - all mouth and no ears). Someone who will not shut up. Frequently refers to a powerful local base station transmitting to mobile CBers, often on channel 19. "Bucket mouth"/"Linear lungs," but a base station rather than a mobile. Sometimes, though rarely, used to refer to a very loud mobile user.
Aye-firmative	Variant of "Affirmative."
Back Door	The rearmost vehicle driver in a group that watches for police officers approaching from behind and gives warning to the others in the group to slow down when speeding (see also "Front Door" and "Rocking Chair").
Back it down/Break it down	Reduce driving speed to the speed limit.
Back row/Party row	An area of a truck stop, generally located in the back of the property, where prostitutes congregate.
Bambi	Wildlife on the road, primarily deer (from Bambi).
Bear bait	An erratic or speeding driver.
Bird-dog	Radar detector.
Bird-dog is barking	Indication that Radar has been detected ("My bird-dog is barking").
Billy-Bunn	Funny driver
Black Gold/Texas Tea	Oil or a tanker hauling Crude Oil to the refinery. (From The Beverly Hillbillies)
Bob-tail	Semi-truck traveling without a trailer.
Boop Boop/Cluck Cluck Chicken Truck	Greetings exchanged between chicken haulers.
Break/Breaker	Informing other CB users that you would like to start a transmission on a channel. May be followed by either the channel number, indicating that anyone may acknowledge (e.g., "Breaker One-niner" refers to channel 19, the most widely used among truck drivers), or by a specific "handle", which is requesting a particular individual to respond.
Bucket mouth/Linear lungs	Someone swearing on CB/Someone who will not shut up. Similar to "Alligator Station", but usually refers to a mobile user rather than a base station.
CB Rambo	A radio user who brags about his fighting prowess.
Chicken coop/Port of entry/The Scales/Scale house	A weigh station.
Chicken lights	The lights on a chicken truck, or marker lights in excess of what the law requires.
Choke and puke	A truck stop restaurant, especially one known for its low quality food.
Comedian	The median or central reservation of a highway. As in, "A bear taking pictures from the comedian."
Copy that/Copy	Acknowledgement, meaning "I heard you" or "I understand."
Cotton choppers	Term for a group of people seen as bothersome or annoying. Occasionally used in a friendly fashion as a rough term of endearment to refer to others. Sometimes used to refer to other people in general, especially those who do not use CB radio.
Cotton-pickin'	Substitution for foul language (now widely used among the general public).
Crotch rocket	A very fast motorcycle (now widely used among the general public).
Do a flip	Turn around and go the opposite direction. As in, "That county mountie did a flip when the bear bait went by in the hammer lane."
Double-nickels	A 55 mph speed zone.
Drain the dragon/The double D	Comic reference for a restroom call.
Driver	Term for someone who drives a truck, not to refer to anyone in other vehicles.
Eat 'em up	A restaurant.
Feeding the bears	Speeding or driving recklessly.
Fifty-Dollar Lane	The inside lane (left most lane) in either direction of an eight-lane highway.
Fighter pilot	An erratic driver who changes lanes often.
Fingerprint	The driver has to load, or more commonly, unload the trailer. That is, to put his fingerprints on all the boxes.
Flip-flop	Used by truckers to refer to the return trip or traveling back the other way, especially when referring to going home on an outbound run.
Four/foe	Variant of "10-4", dropping the 10. (e.g. "Yeah, four", "Foe", or "Yeah, foe").
Flag in five-mile wind	A 45 mph speed zone.
Flying the coop	Going though a weigh station without stopping and triggering a port runner. This type of activity is illegal and reckless driving and can result in an arrest.
Fox hunt	A direction finding activity using cars and vans fitted with CB radios. The objective of this activity is to use a signal strength meter to triangulate or otherwise locate a hidden transmitter, or "fox."
Front Door	The leading vehicle driver in a group that watches for police officers approaching from the front or officers watching oncoming traffic from the side of the road. This driver gives warning to the others in the group to slow down when speeding. See also "Back Door" and "Rocking Chair."
Five o'clock Five Hundred	Reference to the Alabama song by the same name, used to describe rush hour traffic, which is typically thickest around 5 pm for the end of the work day.
Gator, or Alligator	A large piece of tire on the road. From a distance it can resemble an alligator sunning on the road.
#handle, Got your ears on?/Anybody got their ears on?	Asking if a specific person or if anyone is listening to a given channel.
Green stamp(s)	Cash money (refers to S&H Green Stamps). When used in the singular form, can also refer to a toll road, such as the New Jersey, Ohio, and Pennsylvania Turnpikes which are all denoted by green route markers. Occasionally refers to a speeding ticket.
Go-go juice	Fuel ("I need to get some go-go juice").
Groceries	Goods being hauled.
Good buddy	In the 1970s, this was the stereotypical term for a friend or acquaintance on the CB airwaves.
Good numbers	Well wishes to a fellow driver.
Hand	Person, especially a working person like a hired hand. Sometimes used to distinguish a between a driver and one who isn't ("I talked to a hand who wants to become a driver").
Handle	The nickname a CB user uses in CB transmissions. Other CB users will refer to the user by this nickname. To say "What's your handle?" is to ask another user for their CB nickname.
Hammer	The gas pedal or accelerator.
Hammer down	Driving at high speed - or trying to with the gas pedal fully depressed. ("He's got the hammer down!", "I put the hammer down, but this is as fast as it goes."; now used among the general public).
Hammer lane	The passing lane or the "fast lane". (E.g., "Don't let smokey see you camping out in the hammer lane, buddy").
Hot mic	A CB user who monopolizes a radio channel by talking in excess.
Hundred-mile coffee	Very strong coffee.
Jabber/Jabbering idiot/Babble/Babbling idiot	A CB user transmitting in a foreign language.
Keep the left door closed	Make time by not stopping.
Kicker/Footwarmer	A linear amplifier used to illegally increase CB transmit power. A favorite tool of "Alligator Stations," "Bucket Mouths" and "Linear Lungs." Frowned upon by most users.
Lot lizard	A prostitute in a rest area or the parking area of a truck stop.
Mud Duck	A cb user that has a weak signal and they keep trying to talk despite the fact that no one can understand them.
Nap Trap	A rest area.
Negatory	No, negative (often emphatic, like "Hell no"; see "10-77/10-double-7").
Noisy Groove	A rumble strip.
On one's donkey	Following another vehicle too close; tailgating ("You have a sports car 'on your donkey'").
Organ Donor	A motorcyclist who does NOT wear a safety helmet. If he/ she ends up in an accident that is fatal, the assumption is that organs may be salvaged.
Outdoor TV	A drive-in theatre.
Over one's shoulder / Over one's donkey	The road behind that one has just traveled ("How's it look over your shoulder / over your donkey?").
Outlawed	Federal Department of Transportation hours of service are expired and the driver must park for the night.
Peanut butter in one's ears	Oblivious to or ignoring CB transmission.
Pickle park	A rest area, especially one with a reputation for prostitution. Can also be used to describe large grassy medians on highways, e.g. "There's a smokey doing flip flops around the pickle park."
Portable Phone Booth	A idiot that is on a cellphone/ smart phone while driving. Many US states have laws against people using these phones while driving, as this can cause an accident.
Potty mouth/ Toilet mouth	Someone using foul and disgusting language on the CB radio.
Reading the mail	Operator is listening but not actively transmitting.
Rocking Chair	The vehicle(s) in a group positioned between the front door and back door drivers. Called the rocking chair because drivers in that position of the group can relax while speeding because the front door and back door drivers are watching for the police (See "Front Door" and "Back Door").
Rubbernecking/ Rubbernecks/ Rubberneckers	Looking at something on the side of the road, causing a backup. / People slowing down to look at something, particularly an accident.
Runners	People seen running recklessly across a major highway, especially highways and interstates near the US/ Mexican border. Some have been hit and even ran over by/ killed by traffic.
Sandbagging	Listening to CB conversation without participating, despite having the capability of speaking. This is not the same as listening in using a simple receiver, as the person sandbagging can transmit using the two-way radio, but chooses not to. It is for the purpose of monitoring CB users for entertainment or for gathering information about the actions of a particular user. Often, CB users "sandbag" to listen to others' responses to their previous input to a conversation, sometimes referred to as "reading the mail."
Seat cover	An attractive woman in a vehicle, especially one who is scantily-clad or wearing sexy clothing.
Semi-pro	Pickup truck drivers congregating with truckers.
Thick stuff	Bad weather, preferably fog caused by rain or heavy snow.
Three Sisters	Three large hills on I-80E between Salt Lake City, Utah and Fort Bridger, Wyoming (now used by the general public). May be related to the "Three Sisters" rogue wave on Lake Superior.
Triple Nickel	CB users sometimes migrate to "out of band" channels/frequencies, most famously 27.555 MHz, referred to as "Triple Nickel." 27.555 MHz is well above the 40 channel CB standard allowing for a more private conversation and enhanced radio communications. Modified equipment is usually required to access this frequency.
Turn and burn	To return from a destination back to the original starting point of a trip, especially in a hurry and/or non-stop so as not to lose time.
Turtle race	Two trucks side by side, one trying to pass the other, but both have speed governors.
Suicide jockey	A driver who is hauling dangerous goods, such as explosives.
Supporting the Economy	Term for generally running errands (especially for buying merchandise), can also be used to reference working in general (ie "I'm out supporting the economy right now."
Wall Paper	A traffic citation/ticket (especially a speeding ticket).
Wall to wall and treetop tall	An exceptionally clear and strong signal/transmission.
Watering hole	A truck stop.
Yardstick	A mile marker or mile post.

== See also ==
- Brevity code
- Ten-code
