= Holmes wrecker =

Holmes wrecker may refer to:

- a recovery vehicle invented by Ernest Holmes Sr.
- a tow truck brand owned by Miller Industries
