= Vehicle registration plates of Korea =

Vehicle registration plates of Korea may refer to:

- Vehicle registration plates of North Korea
- Vehicle registration plates of South Korea
