= Wreck Chasers =

- Genre: Reality
- Country of origin: United States
- Original language: English
- No. of seasons: 1
- No. of episodes: 6

Production
- Running time: 25 mins.

Original release
- Network: TLC
- Release: October 27, 2010

Wreck Chasers is an American reality television show on TLC about tow truckers competing in Philadelphia, Pennsylvania to claim wrecks and collect cash.

== Cast ==
- Michelle Alvarado
- P.J. and Pam Augustine
- Mickey Caban
- Ralph (Reds) Elliott
- Little Man
