= International Towing Museum =

Tow truck museum in Chattanooga, Tennessee

International Towing and Recovery Hall of Fame & Museum

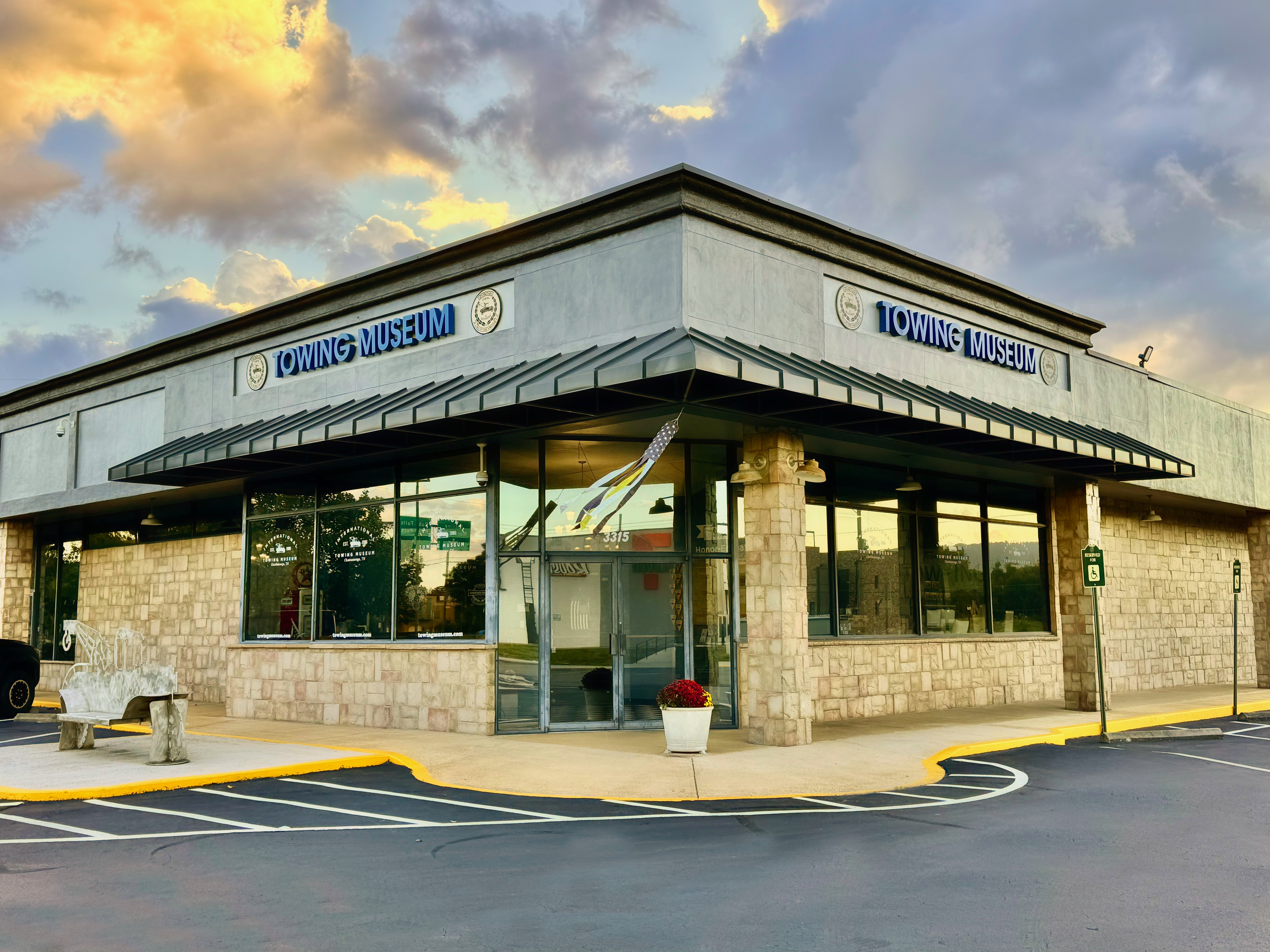
- The International Towing & Recovery Hall of Fame & Museum in 2025.
- Established: October 1995; 31 years ago
- Location: Chattanooga, Tennessee
- Coordinates: 35.016923°N 85.323146°W
- President: Bill Gratzianna
- Website: towingmuseum.com

The International Towing & Recovery Hall of Fame & Museum, is a museum located in Chattanooga, Tennessee dedicated to the history of the towing industry. It features restored antique wreckers and equipment from the tow truck industry, as well displaying related toys, tools, equipment, and pictorial histories. Chattanooga is considered the birthplace of the U.S. towing industry.

== History ==
The first tow truck was created about 3.5 miles (6 km) away from the museum at the Ernest Holmes Company in Chattanooga, in 1916.

The museum started in 1986 when a group named the Friends of Towing opened the Towing Hall of Fame and Museum to recognise distinguished towing professionals in the industry, as well as starting a collection of towing memorabilia and artefacts. At this point, the museum did not have a permanent home, and was located in a trailer and toured towing shows around the country. It found its permanent home as the International Towing and Recovery Hall of Fame and Museum in 1995 in Chattanooga, Tennessee. It was dedicated in October 1995 and is a non-profit organization.

== Collection ==
The collection of tow trucks at the museum ranges from the early days of the automobile and includes miscellaneous antique toys and memorabilia.The museum holds a replica of the first tow truck ever produced, made from a 1913 Cadillac.

In 2026, the company Landoll donated the 40,000th trailer they produced to the museum to mark the museum's 40th anniversary.

The museum is also home to the Towing Hall of Fame, and in 2006 they opened a memorial named the Wall of the Fallen, which is dedicated to those who lost their lives working in towing.
