= Vehicle registration plates of South Korea =

South Korea (Republic of Korea)
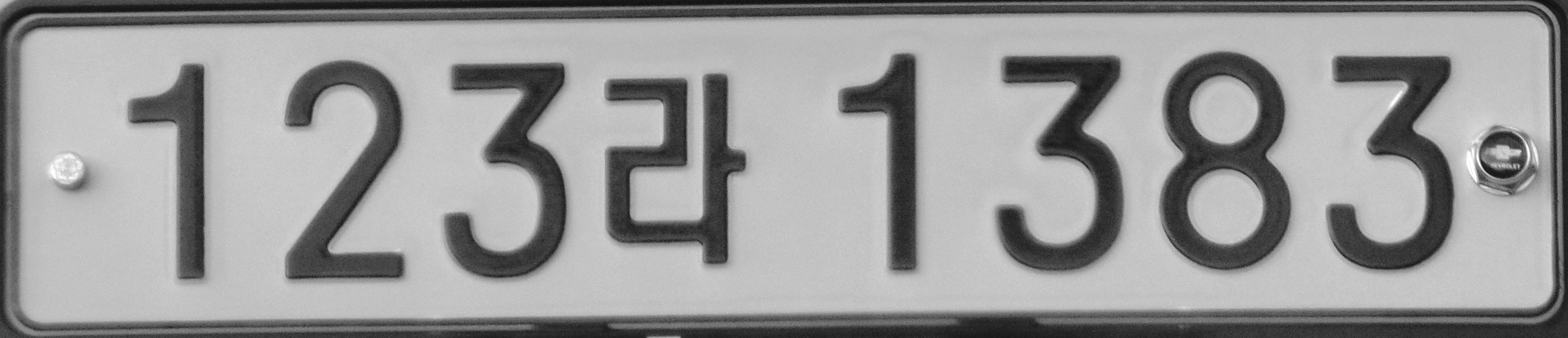
- South Korean regular legal standard number plate
- Country: South Korea
- Country code: ROK

Current series
- Size: 520 mm × 110 mm 20.5 in × 4.3 in
- Serial format: 12 A(BC) 456 (for regular/private plates)
- Colour (front): Black on white
- Colour (rear): Black on white

South Korean implementation of an unofficial format similar to that of the EU. The current South Korean format also includes an anti-forgery hologram.

In South Korea, the Surface Transportation Bureau of the Ministry of Land, Infrastructure and Transport (MOLIT) oversees the design and issue of license plates (Korean: 번호판, 番號版, lit. 'number board') for motor vehicles. The international road code for South Korea is ROK (i.e. Republic of Korea).

== Appearance ==
=== Pre-1973 ===
Few examples of designs prior to 1973 remain in existence, and they are no longer valid. The most recent design is similar to the ones that followed, but the positions of some elements are different. These early plates are typically white with blue lettering, a color scheme still used today for motorcycle plates.

=== 1973–2003 ===
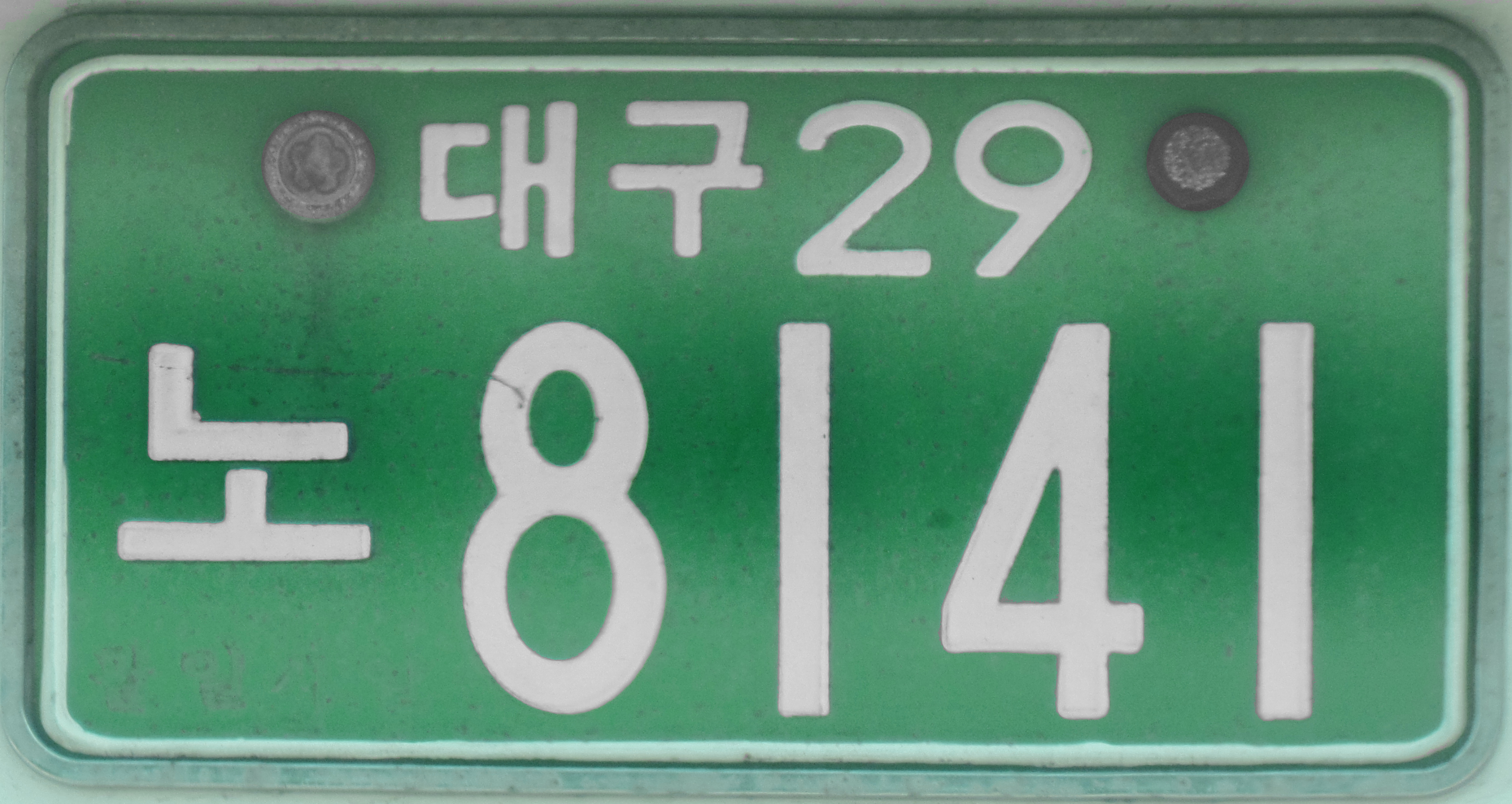
A typical registration plate for private cars from 1973 to 2003; they are still used on some older vehicles in South Korea.

Upon initial inspection, plates issued during this era seem to closely resemble those used in Japan (see Japanese license plates for examples), with green backgrounds and white serials. The plates are approximately the same width and height as North American or Japanese number plates. They measure 335 mm wide by 170 mm high for passenger vehicles, and 440 mm wide by 220 mm high for large trucks and buses. The information is arranged into two lines.

The first line, occupying the upper third of the plate, identifies the province or special city that issued the plate and the vehicle class.

The vehicle classes are as follows:

- 01-69: passenger cars
- 70-79: vans
- 80-97: "freight vehicles" (trucks)
- 98-99: "specialized vehicles" (such as recreational vehicles)

The second line, occupying the lower two-thirds of the plate, uniquely identifies the vehicle. It contains a hangeul syllable prefix on the left, and a serial number on the right.

Only a small range of Korean characters are valid for each type of vehicle. Some of them identify more specific vehicle types; e.g., heo (허) is only used for rental cars. Some special plates have the Korean suffix replaced by a circled Korean word.

- Diplomat's cars: "diplomat" (외교)
- Construction vehicles: "commerce" (상품) - These will have the province name/vehicle class replaced by an organization name.
- National government vehicles: "country" (국) - These have no province name.
- South Korean military: "army" (육) - These have no province name

Private vehicles used by the US military in South Korea had no Korean character but instead had a single half-size digit followed by a dash and the four digit number. The digit identified the city where the car was registered. A license plate that read 5-4187, for example, was a US Army car registered in Taegu. Vehicles to be used on a US military base had a white license plate with "US Army" written in English on the top with a six-digit number below.

The serial number is always four digits, 0-9. Leading zeros are included in the serial number.

When installed on a vehicle, the rear plate features an official seal over one of the retaining screws to deter tampering or theft.

These plates are always issued embossed; flat plates are unofficial replicas. Dies varied slightly over time. Starting in 1997, the four-digit serial number was repeated on the plate, spelled out in small stamped hangeul type on the lower left.

==== Colors ====
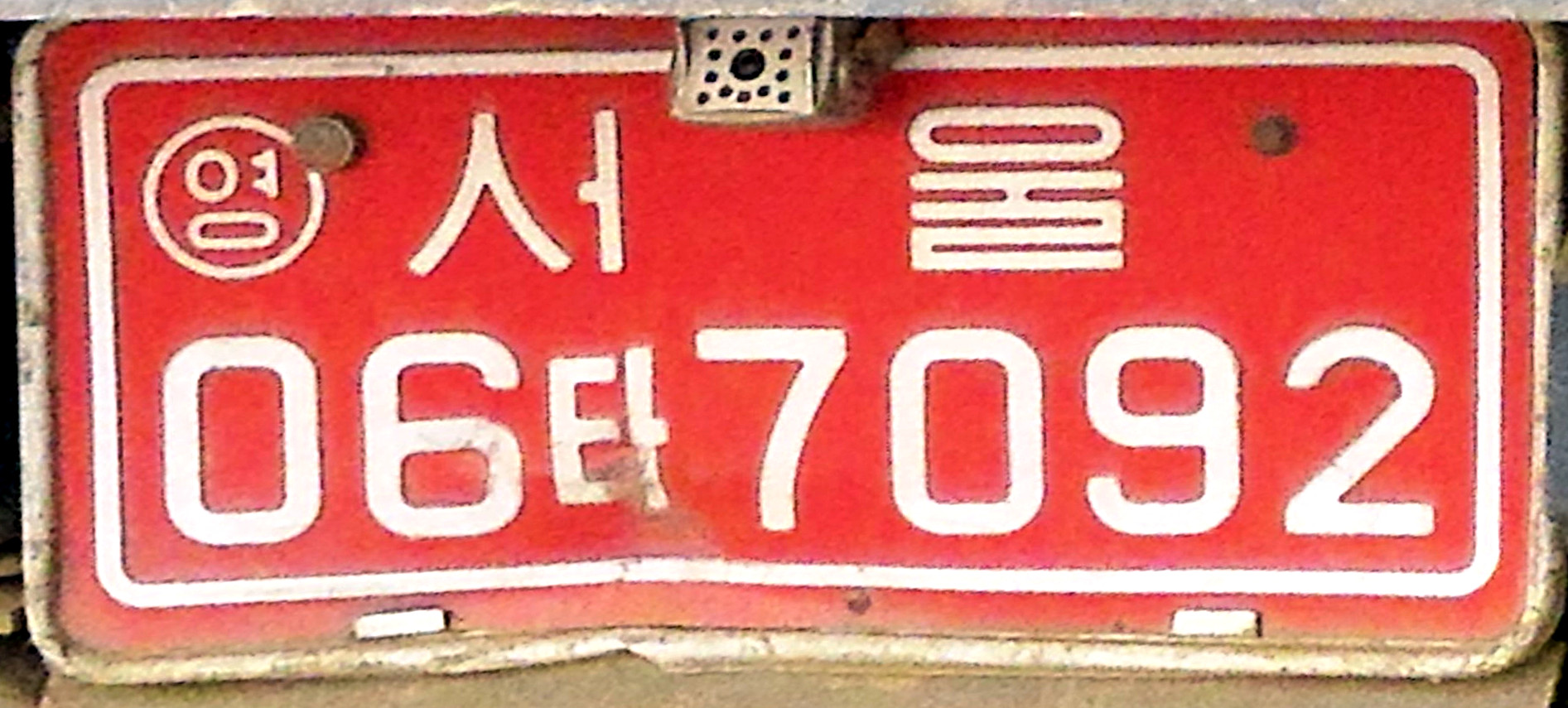
Registration plate on a commercial dump truck in Seoul

- Private cars, government cars - green with white; or white with black (some cities)
- Taxis, cars for hire - yellow with blue
- Construction vehicles - orange/red with white
- Diplomat's cars - blue with white

=== 2004–2006 ===
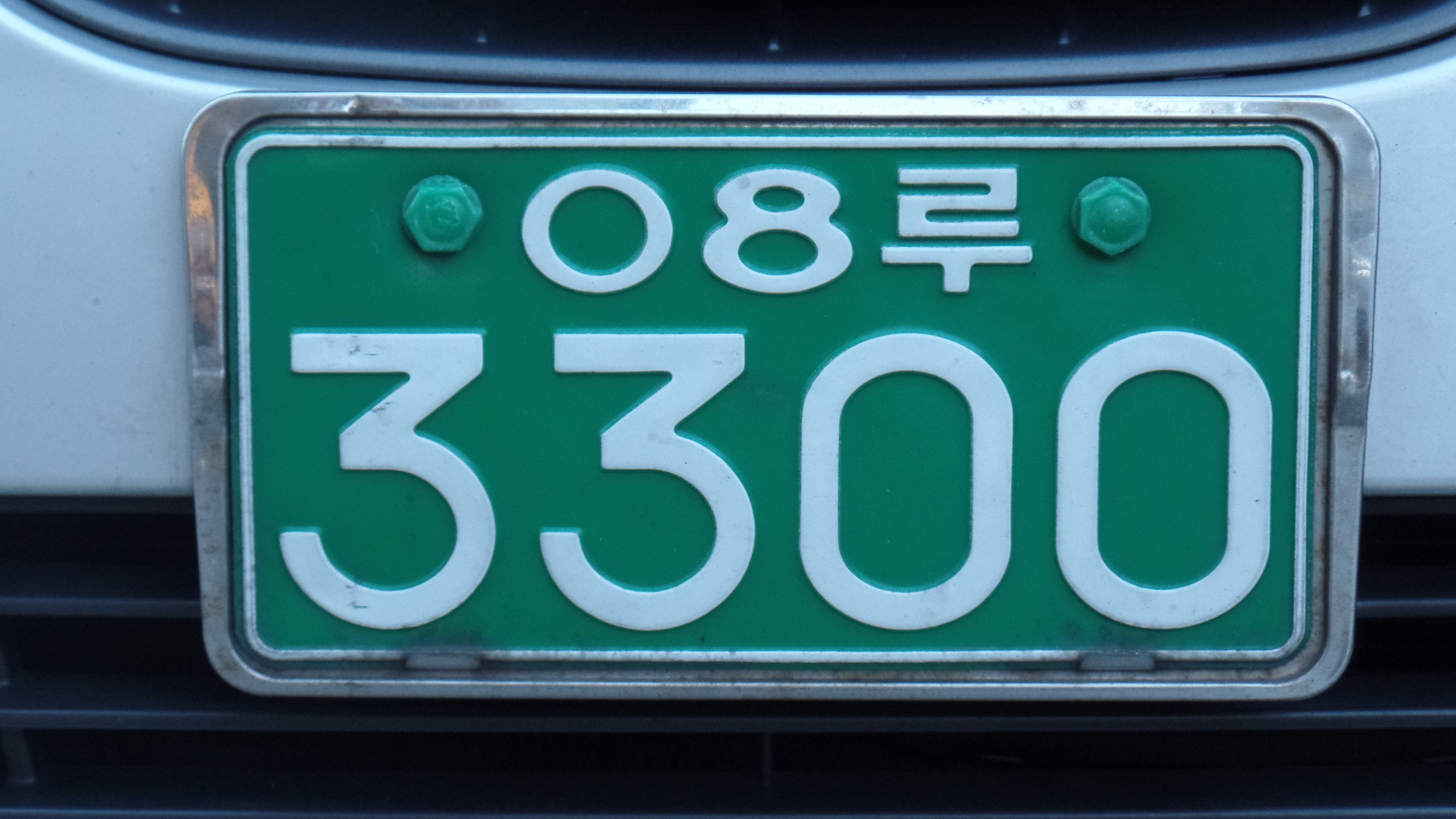
Vehicle registration plate for private passenger cars from 2004 to 2006.

These plates are similar in appearance to the 1973 to 2003 series, with some changes to the information presented. The province name is omitted. The prefix on the bottom line is moved to the top line - right of the class number for regular series, and left of the class number for the circled special series (diplomat, construction, etc.). The serial number is printed larger to fill the entire bottom line, but still four digits for most plates, except for special series plates, which have six.

=== 2006–2019 ===
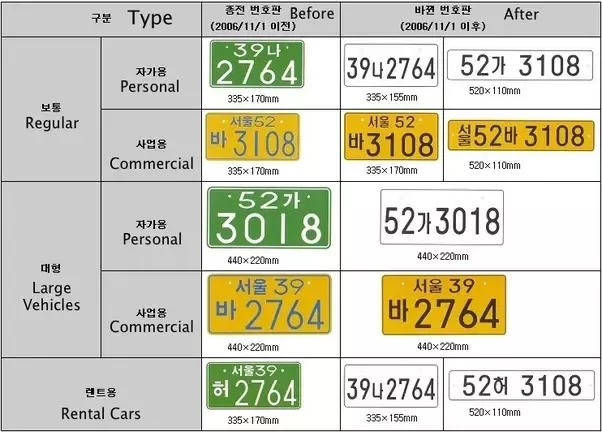
Chart

A new system has been phased in, starting with plates for government vehicles in 2006 and appearing on privately owned vehicles now. The color scheme is now a simple black-on-white design. Dimensions have been slightly altered; the new plates are slightly less tall, only 155 mm. They are also available in a size format similar to the plates used in European countries, 520 mm wide by 110 mm tall. The numbering follows the pattern of the 2004 plate series, but all on one line. From left to right, the plate has the vehicle class, Korean suffix, and four-digit serial number. Truck and bus plates remain the same width, but shrink slightly to 200 mm tall, and incorporate all the information into one line.

=== 2019–present ===
In September 2019, the vehicle class number for private vehicles was increased from two to three digits. From 1 July 2020, a blue anti-forging holographic stripe (also called a "Euroband"), which doubles as a distinguishing country mark, was added on the left edge of the plate.

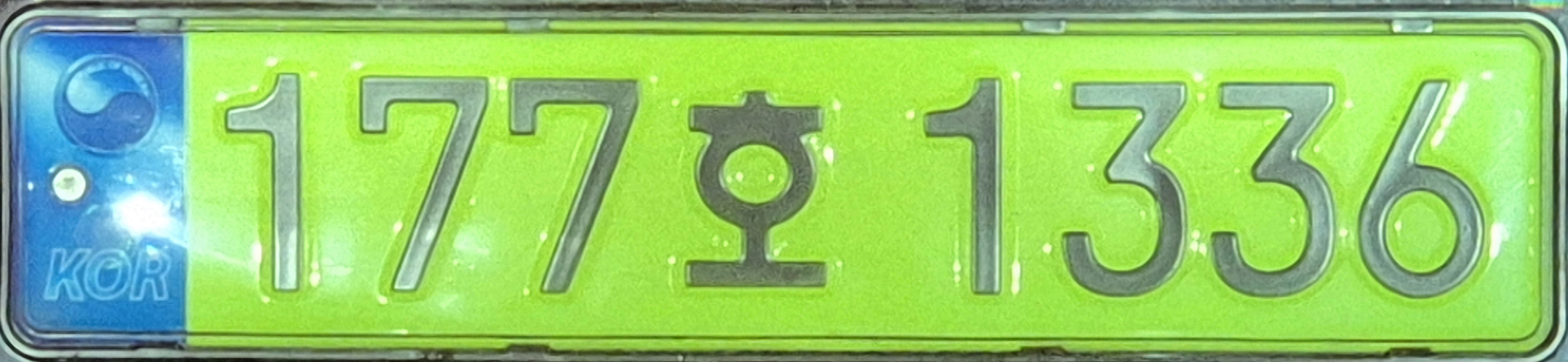
Neon-green license plates for luxury cars, which also includes the Euroband

In January 2024, the Korean government introduced a new law enforcing all owners of cars worth $58,000 and over to use a new neon green licence plate. The program aimed to fight the private use of company-owned luxury cars, considered a form of tax evasion. 4 months after the introduction of the new plates, sales of luxury vehicles had already fallen by 27% (sales of Bentley vehicles dropped by 77%).

== Format ==
=== Private ===
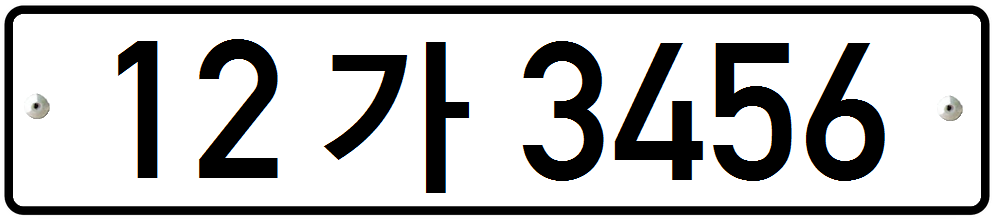
European-sized

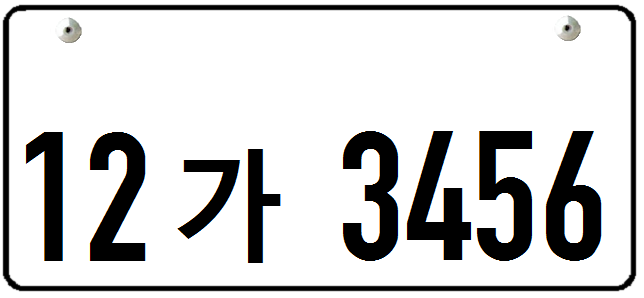
North American-sized (335x155mm)

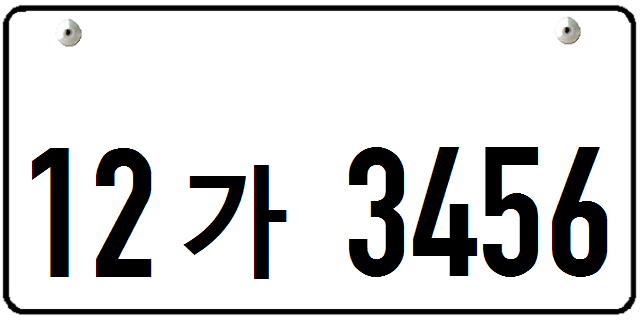
Large vehicle-sized (440x220mm)

The format is made up of (#)## L ####

- 2 initial digits:
  - 01 to 69: Typical passenger vehicles
  - 70 to 79: Vans, recreational vehicles, coaches
  - 80 to 97: "freight Vehicles" (trucks)
  - 98 to 99: "Specialized Vehicles" (such as tow trucks)
- 3 initial digits:
  - 100 to 699: Typical passenger vehicles
  - 700 to 799: Vans, recreational vehicles, coaches
  - 800 to 979: "freight Vehicles" (trucks)
  - 980 to 997: "Specialized Vehicles" (such as tow trucks)
  - 998 to 999: Emergency Vehicles (police cars, ambulances)
- Letter:
  - Private vehicles: 가 (Ga), 나 (Na), 다 (Da), 라 (La), 마 (Ma), 거 (Geo), 너 (Neo), 더 (Deo), 러 (Leo), 머 (Meo), 버 (Beo), 서 (Seo), 어 (Eo), 저 (Jeo), 고 (Go), 노 (No), 도 (Do), 로 (Lo), 모 (Mo), 보 (Bo), 소 (So), 오 (O), 조 (Jo), 구 (Gu), 누 (Nu), 두 (Du), 루 (Lu), 무 (Mu), 부 (Bu), 수 (Su), 우 (U), 주 (Ju)
  - Rental cars: 허 (Heo), 하 (Ha), 호 (Ho)
- Military vehicles:
  - Army: 육 (Yuk) ('육군')
  - Navy: 해 (Hae) ('해군')
  - Air force: 공 (Gong) ('공군')
  - Ministry of National Defense: 국 (Guk) ('국방부')
  - Joint Chiefs of Staff: 합 (Hap) ('합동참모본부')
- 4 final digits: 1000 to 9999, assigned sequentially regardless of the car type.
  - 0100 to 0999 started to appear on passenger vehicles beginning in summer of 2015 due to shortage of available four-digit numbers.
  - Starting late 2016, passenger vehicle plates expired in the past started to get reissued, as approximately 21mil available combinations from the current "(#)##L ####" format was exhausted. There are about approximately 5.5 mil plates available for recycling and it is expected to run out in 2020. Currently, the government is working on new sequence of passenger plates and it is expected to issue as early as 2018.

=== Commercial vehicles ===
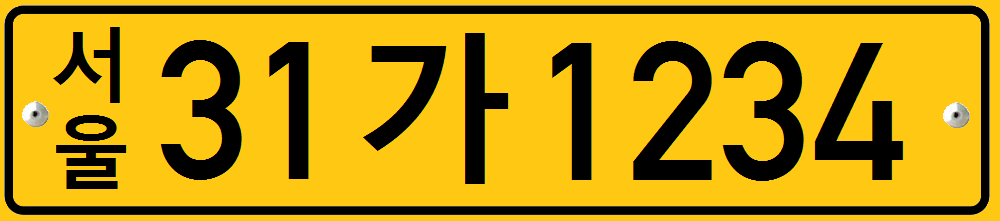
European-sized

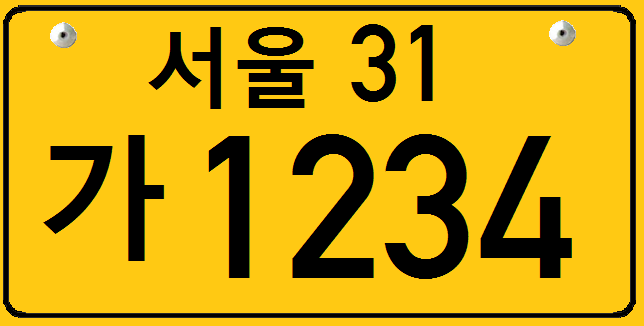
North American-sized (355x155mm)

The format is made up of [Province/City] ## on one line and L #### on the other.

- Province/city: The province/city name is written in full in hangeul, minus the -do (도) or -si (시) suffix. Provinces and cities issuing plates include (in South Korean jamo order):
  - Gangwon (강원)
  - Gyeonggi (경기)
  - Gyeongnam (경남)
  - Gyeongbuk (경북)
  - Gwangju (광주)
  - Daegu (대구)
  - Daejeon (대전)
  - Busan (부산)
  - Seoul (서울)
  - Sejong (세종)
  - Ulsan (울산)
  - Incheon (인천)
  - Jeonnam (전남)
  - Jeonbuk (전북)
  - Jeju (제주)
  - Chungnam (충남)
  - Chungbuk (충북)
- 2 initial digits:
  - 11 to 69: Taxis
  - 70 to 79: Vans and Buses
  - 80 to 97: "freight Vehicles" (trucks)
  - 98 to 99: "Specialized Vehicles" (such as recreational vehicles)
- Letter:
  - Taxi/Bus: 바 (Ba), 사 (Sa), 아 (A), 자 (Ja)
  - Delivery Van/Truck: 배 (Bae)
- 4 final digits: 1000 to 9999, assigned sequentially regardless of the car type.

== Construction equipment ==
- Bulldozer : 01
- Excavator (Poclain) : 02
- Loader : 03
- Fork Lift Truck : 04
- Motor Scraper : 05
- Dump Truck : 06
- Crane : 07
- Motor Grader : 08
- Road Roller : 09
- Road Stabilizer : 10
- Concrete Batching Plant : 11
- Concrete Finisher : 12
- Concrete Spreader : 13
- Concrete Mixer Truck (Ready-Mixed Concrete) : 14
- Concrete Pump Car : 15
- Asphalt Mixing Plant : 16
- Asphalt Finisher : 17
- Asphalt Spreader : 18
- Aggregate Spreader : 19
- Stone Crusher (Crushing Plant) : 20
- Air Compressor : 21
- Piercer (Drilling Equipment) : 22
- Pile Driver : 23
- Gravel Digging Equipment : 24
- Dredger : 25
- Special Construction Equipment : 26
- Tower Crane : 27

== Two-wheeled vehicles (Motorcycles) ==
Current smaller motorcycle series are seen in blue on white. The registration consists of one or two Korean letters, followed by four numerals. At the top of the plate are characters indicating the district and two registration center code.

== Military vehicles ==
License plate of a military vehicle bearing the "army" symbol (육) as seen in 2013

A military police vehicle of the Marine Corps bearing "해".

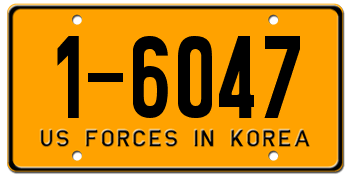
US Forces license plate

Military vehicles use license plates designed by the Ministry of National Defense, sharing size and color with standard plates but differing in content and issuance. All plates follow the format 'Unit Number + Military Branch Symbol + Serial Number.' Civilian-use and construction vehicles use plates with military branch symbols: '국' (Ministry of Defense), '합' (Joint Staff), '육' (Army), '해' (Navy/Marines), and '공' (Air Force).

== Police vehicles ==
Current police series is in black on white. The registration consists of 998 or 999, followed by one Korean letter and four numerals.

== Diplomat vehicles ==
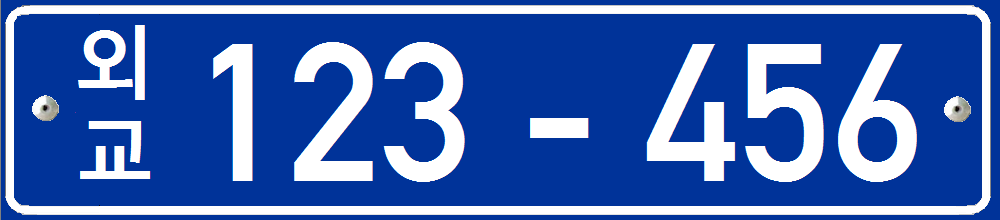
European-sized

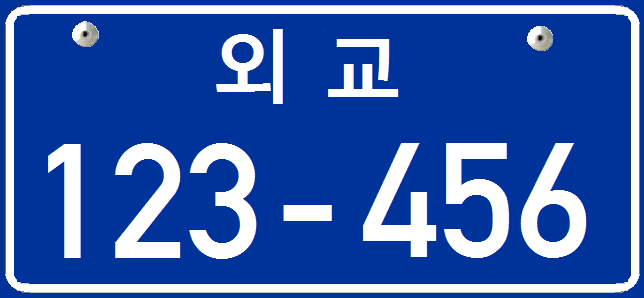
North American-sized

License plates for diplomatic vehicles are blue with white lettering. The top of the plate reads 외교 (diplomat) and the plates display a six-digit number divided into two three digit numbers separated by a dash. The first three numbers indicate the country (086, for example, is for cars belonging to the Vietnamese embassy in South Korea), so a typical plate would read 086-001. The first three digits on diplomatic plates are assigned in time order in which the Republic of Korea established diplomatic relations with each foreign country, so in the example above, Vietnam was the 86th country to establish diplomatic relations with the R.O.K.

A different version of (probably) diplomatic (or related) plates contains only two Korean characters (외빈) and only 3 digits, for example, "외빈 201", on a dark blue background. A convoy of four such vehicles was sighted in Itaewon on 23 December 2014.

== Temporary plates ==
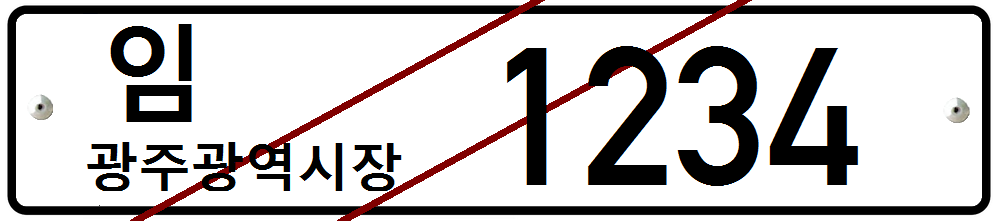
