= Trucking industry in American culture =

Culture of truck drivers

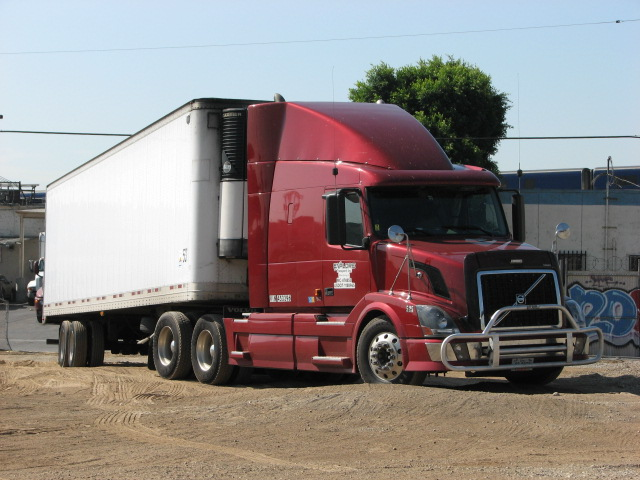
Truck drivers have been widely portrayed in the culture of the United States

The portrayal of the trucking industry in United States popular culture spans the depictions of trucks and truck drivers, as images of the masculine side of trucking are a common theme. The portrayal of drivers ranges from the heroes of the 1950s, living a life of freedom on the open road, to the depiction of troubled serial killers of the 1990s. Songs and movies about truck drivers were first popular in the 1940s, and mythologized their wandering lifestyle in the 1960s. Truck drivers were glorified as modern day cowboys, outlaws, and rebels during the peak of trucker culture in the 1970s.

During the latter portion of the 20th century, the trucking industry's image began to wane, and their reputation suffered. More recent portrayals of truckers have been as male chauvinists or serial killers. Portrayals of the actual semi-trailer trucks has largely concentrated on stories of the machines becoming sentient, or self-aware, usually with extraterrestrial assistance (as in Maximum Overdrive).

== 20th century ==
=== 1939–1980 ===
In the early days of trucking culture, truck drivers were more frequently portrayed as protagonists in the popular media. In Trucking country: The road to America's Wal-Mart economy, author Shane Hamilton explores the history of trucking and how developments in the trucking industry helped the so-called big-box stores dominate the U.S. marketplace.

The first original song about truck driving appeared in 1939 when Cliff Bruner and His Boys recorded Ted Daffan's 'Truck Driver's Blues', a song explicitly marketed to roadside cafe owners who were installing juke boxes in record numbers to serve truckers and other motorists.

— Shane Hamilton,

The 1940 film They Drive by Night co-starred Humphrey Bogart as an independent truck driver struggling to become economically independent during the Great Depression. The Gang's All Here was a story about a trucking company targeted by saboteurs, released in 1941.

In the 1950s, truck drivers were considered the "Knights of the Road" for helping stranded travelers. Drivers were viewed as the antithesis of "The Organization Man" (the title of William H. Whyte's 1956 bestseller) or "the man in the gray flannel suit", who sat in an office every day or was watched over by managers. Popular trucking songs glorified the life of drivers as independent "wanderers", while attempts to bring factory-style efficiency (using tachographs) to trucking were met with little success. Drivers routinely sabotaged and discovered new ways to falsify the machine's records.

"Six Days on the Road" was a chart-topping trucker hit released in 1963 by country music singer Dave Dudley. Author and country music historian Bill Malone notes the song "effectively captured both the boredom and the excitement, as well as the swaggering masculinity, that often accompanied long distance trucking".

Country music scholar Bill Malone has gone so far as to say that trucking songs account for the largest component of work songs in the country music catalog. For a style of music that has, since its commercial inception in the 1920s, drawn attention to the coal man, the steel drivin’ man, the railroad worker, and the cowboy, this certainly speaks volumes about the cultural attraction of the trucker in the American popular consciousness.

— Shane Hamilton,

The decade of the 70s saw the heyday of truck driving, and the dramatic rise in the popularity of trucker culture. Truck drivers were romanticized as modern-day cowboys and outlaws (a stereotype that persists even today). This was due in part to their use of Citizens Band (CB) radio to relay information to each other regarding the locations of police officers and transportation authorities. Plaid shirts, trucker hats, CB radios, and using CB slang were popular not just with drivers but among the general public.

Author Lawrence Ouellet examines the work lives of truck drivers in his book, Pedal to the metal.

The association of truckers with cowboys and related myths was perhaps most obvious during the urban-cowboy craze of the late 1970s, a period that saw middle-class urbanites wearing cowboy clothing and patronizing simulated cowboy nightclubs. During this time, at least four truck driver movies appeared, CB radio became popular, and truck drivers were prominently featured in all forms of popular media.

— Lawrence J. Ouellet,

The 1971 made-for-tv film Duel portrayed a truck driver as an anonymous stalker, and was the first feature-length film directed by Steven Spielberg.

The television series Movin' On, starring Claude Akins and Frank Converse as two freelance truck drivers, ran on the NBC Network from 1974 to 1976. The show featured a 1974 Kenworth W-925, which some fans of the show claimed was the actual star.

White Line Fever was a film released in 1975, that told the story of a Vietnam War veteran who returns home to take over his father's trucking business, only to find that corrupt shippers want to force him to carry illegal contraband. The movie played upon several cowboy and western film motifs, and portrayed the notion that truck drivers are possessed with a certain wanderlust.

In 1976, the number one hit on the Billboard chart was "Convoy", a novelty song about a convoy of truck drivers evading speed traps and toll booths across America. The song inspired the 1978 action film Convoy, featuring a shirtless and defiant Kris Kristofferson screaming "Piss on your law!" After the film's release, thousands of independent truck drivers went on strike and participated in violent protests during the 1979 energy crisis (although similar strikes had occurred during the 1973 energy crisis).

The year 1977 saw the release of Smokey and the Bandit, the third-highest-grossing film of that year, beaten only by Star Wars and Close Encounters of the Third Kind. Protagonist Burt Reynolds as "The Bandit", who escorts "The Snowman" in an effort to deliver contraband (or "bootleg") beer, envisions trucking as a "hedonistic joyride entirely devoid from economic reality". Breaker! Breaker! was another 1977 action film focused on truck drivers, starring Chuck Norris and displaying movie posters with the tagline "...he's got a CB radio and a hundred friends who just might get mad!"

Sylvester Stallone starred in the 1978 film F.I.S.T., a story loosely based on the Teamsters Union (a labor union which includes truck drivers) and its then president, Jimmy Hoffa.

In 1979 B. J. and the Bear aired starring Greg Evigan, a television series about a trucker and his chimpanzee companion.

=== 1980–2000 ===
The latter portion of the 20th century saw the decline of trucking culture, and the image of drivers generally moved to a more negative portrayal. As a result truck drivers were frequently portrayed as antagonists in movies.

In 1982, a southern California truck driver named Larry Walters gained short-lived fame as "Lawn Chair Larry", for pulling a stunt in which he ascended to a height of 16,000 feet (4,900 m) by attaching helium balloons to a lawn chair. Walters claims he intended to float low to the ground, but was surprised when his chair initially shot up at a rate of 1,000 feet (300 m) per minute. Walters blamed poor eyesight for ruining his dreams to become an Air Force pilot, which eventually led to his stunt.

The 1984 animated TV series The Transformers told the story of a group of extraterrestrial humanoid robots, who are disguised as automobiles. The leader of the protagonist Autobots clan, Optimus Prime, is depicted as a semi-truck.

The American Trucking Associations initiated a campaign in 1985 to improve the trucking industry's image in the face of declining public opinion. One such move was changing the name of the "National Truck Rodeo" to the "National Driving Championship", because the term "rodeo" seemed to imply reckless driving.

The 1986 horror film Maximum Overdrive by author Stephen King was a campy story about trucks which had become sentient due to radiation emanating from a passing comet. The trucks force the humans to pump their diesel fuel, and the leader is depicted with the face of Spider-Man's antagonist Green Goblin.

The 1991 film Thelma & Louise featured a recurring minor character, a dirty and abrasive truck driver who frequently harasses the main characters during chance encounters. Author Michael Dunne describes the character as "fat and ignorant" and "a lustful fool blinded by a delusion of male superiority". Thelma and Louise eventually get their revenge by feigning interest in him, then blowing up his tanker truck full of gasoline.

The most infamous image of the 1992 Los Angeles riots was the attack on Reginald Denny. Denny was a white truck driver who was assaulted in a black neighborhood during the riots, and was almost beaten to death. The footage received nationwide media coverage, and the defendants in the case (the "L.A. Four") claimed to be fighting "economic oppression".

Long-haul trucker Keith Hunter Jesperson made headlines in 1994 when it was discovered he was the "Happy Face Killer".

The 1998 film Black Dog starred Patrick Swayze as a truck driver recently released from prison, who was then manipulated into transporting illegal guns. Author Scott Doviak describes the movie as a "high-octane riff on White Line Fever" and "a throwback to the trucker movies of the 70s".

In 1999, The Simpsons episode Maximum Homerdrive aired. It featured Homer and Bart making a delivery for a truck driver named Red after he unexpectedly dies of 'food poisoning'.

== 21st century ==
The 2001 feature film Joy Ride portrayed the story of two college-aged brothers who purchase a CB radio while on a road trip. After attempting to play a prank on an anonymous truck driver, the pair soon learn the driver is a dangerous killer. In the 2008 direct-to-DVD sequel Joy Ride 2: Dead Ahead, the truck driver ("Rusty Nail") plays psychological mind games with a young couple who are on a road trip.

Suspect Zero was a 2004 film which featured a truck driver as the ultimate serial killer, committing crimes in all 50 states without leaving evidence behind to link his crimes together.

Also in 2004, the Federal Bureau of Investigation (FBI) began investigating a string of murders in which the victims were found along the Interstate 40 corridor in Oklahoma and several other states, which sparked the creation of the Highway Serial Killings Initiative. The lead suspect in the case was John Williams, a long-haul truck driver who was later convicted of murdering a woman in Mississippi.

The 2008 feature film Trucker addressed the unique perspective of a female truck driver. Starring Michelle Monaghan, the actress spent time with other female truckers and actually applied for her commercial driver's license. She claims that if she had failed the driving test, she would have backed out of the role. Los Angeles Times author Paul Brownfield described the film as a small, low-budget character piece, and a stark contrast to the starring actress' previous role in Made of Honor.

Writer-director James Mottern said he was influenced by nuanced, beloved movies of the 1970s such as The Last Detail and Five Easy Pieces. Mottern said his female trucker character began with a woman he saw at a Southern California truck stop—a 'beautiful woman, bleach blond ... skin tanned to leather, walked like a Teamster, blue eyes.'

— Paul Brownfield,

In 2009, the FBI released the results of a five-year-long study (the Highway Serial Killings Initiative) investigating more than 500 unsolved murders of prostitutes, hitchhikers, and stranded motorists, many of whom were dumped on or near major trucking routes. The FBI has speculated that many of these victims were murdered by long-haul truck drivers, some of whom may be serial killers. Investigators surmise that the mobility and lack of supervision enjoyed by long-haul truck drivers have contributed to this phenomenon.

In response to the investigation, executive vice president of the Owner-Operator Independent Drivers Association, Todd Spencer, said "Truckers are just absolutely outraged that various media sources or the FBI would draw the conclusion that truckers are over-represented in the ranks of serial killers".

Ice Road Truckers is a reality television series that originally aired on the History Channel from 2007 to 2017 documenting the lives of truck drivers working the Dalton Highway in Alaska. It returned from hiatus in 2025. The show follows drivers as they compete to see who can haul the most loads before the end of the season, while avoiding the pitfalls of dangerous icy roads and mechanical problems.
