= Miller Industries =

Heavy-Duty Tow Truck Manufacturer

- Company type: Public
- Traded as: NYSE: MLR
- Industry: Automotive
- Founded: 1990
- Founder: William G. Miller (Chairman)
- Headquarters: Ooltewah, Tennessee, U.S.
- Area served: Global
- Key people: William G. Miller II (President/Co-CEO); Jeffrey I. Badgley (Co-CEO)
- Products: Tow trucks; car carriers; rotators
- Brands: Brands: Century; Vulcan; Chevron; Holmes; Boniface; Jige
- Subsidiaries: Miller Industries Towing Equipment, Inc.
- Website: www.millerind.com

Miller Industries is an American tow truck and towing equipment manufacturing company based in the Chattanooga suburb of Ooltewah, Tennessee. Its primary subsidiary, Miller Industries Towing Equipment Inc., manufactures a variety of light- to heavy-duty wreckers, car carriers, and rotators under several brand names, including Century, Vulcan, Chevron, and Holmes. Miller Industries also operates international brands with Boniface (U.K.) and Jige (France). It is listed on the New York Stock Exchange under the stock ticker symbol, MLR.

== History ==
Miller Industries was founded in 1990 by William G. Miller in Ooltewah, Tennessee. He formed the company (originally known as the Miller Group) after acquiring three under-performing wrecker and towing equipment manufacturers in Holmes, Century, and Challenger. Other early brand acquisitions included Champion and Eagle. In August 1994, the company made its initial public offering (IPO) and began trading on the New York Stock Exchange with a split-adjusted share price of $7. The company's IPO raised $22.4 million and, by 1996, Miller Industries was nearly free of debt.

That year, Miller Industries expanded internationally, acquiring both Boniface Engineering in the U.K. (Thetford) and Jige International in France (Revigny-sur-Ornain). 1996 also saw the company's acquisition of Mississippi-based towing equipment maker, Vulcan International, and the purchase of a manufacturing facility in Hermitage, Pennsylvania. Its headquarters during this time were located in Atlanta, Georgia.

In 1997, the company opened a plant in Greeneville, Tennessee to build car carriers and other products for its recent Vulcan acquisition. In November of that year, Jeffrey I. Badgley was named the President and sole CEO of the company. Badgley had been serving as co-CEO with William G. Miller who remained Chairman of the company after the announcement. Miller would resume the role of co-CEO in October 2003 alongside Badgley. In December 1997, the company acquired Mercer, Pennsylvania-based Chevron Inc., another tow truck manufacturer. Throughout the late 1990s and until 2014, Miller Industries was the official provider of wreckers and recovery equipment for various NASCAR races.

In 2006, the company announced an expansion of the manufacturing facility at its Ooltewah headquarters. In 2009, Miller Industries introduced a hybrid recovery truck at that year's Daytona 500. In 2011, William G. Miller's son, William G. Miller II, was appointed President of the company. The elder Miller remained chairman and Jeffrey Badgley became sole CEO again. In 2013, the younger Miller was appointed co-CEO alongside Badgley. Between 2015 and 2018, Miller Industries expanded and renovated its plants in Hermitage, Pennsylvania, Greeneville, Tennessee, and Ooltewah, Tennessee. In October 2019, the company introduced the world's first rolling rotator with a 100-ton recovery capacity.

== Products and brands ==
Miller Industries manufactures and sells a variety of wreckers. It also produces car carriers and rotators via a number of different brands. Many of the brands are operated as part of Miller Industries' primary subsidiary, Miller Industries Towing Equipment, Inc., which is considered the largest manufacturer of towing and recovery equipment in the world.

Miller brands include all of the following:

=== Holmes ===
The Holmes brand of wreckers came into existence in 1916 when Ernest Holmes invented the first tow truck in Chattanooga. The Ernest Holmes Company then became an leader in the towing and recovery industry. It was one of the first companies acquired by William G. Miller when he started Miller Industries in 1990.

=== Century ===
Century Wrecker Corp. was founded in 1974 by Ernest Holmes' grandson, Jerry Holmes. It was the first wrecker company to incorporate hydraulic towing equipment onto each wrecker, a feature that is now standard across all tow trucks. Century was another brand the William G. Miller acquired to start Miller Industries in 1990. It is considered the company's flagship brand and features a collection of light- to heavy-duty wreckers and car carriers.

=== Other brands ===
Other brands under the Miller umbrella include Vulcan, Chevron, Boniface, and Jige. Vulcan International was an independent tow truck manufacturer based in Olive Branch, Mississippi before being acquired by Miller Industries in 1996. Likewise, Chevron Inc. was an independent manufacturer of tow trucks based in Mercer, Pennsylvania until its acquisition by Miller in 1997.

Boniface Engineering, a tow truck and equipment manufacturer based in Thetford, Norfolk, England, was founded in 1982. It was acquired by Miller Industries in 1996 and became one of two major European brands for Miller. Boniface wreckers can be found throughout Europe and in parts of Asia. Jige International was another overseas towing equipment manufacturer acquired by Miller in 1996. The brand is based in Revigny-sur-Ornain in France. The company was originally founded in 1969.
