= Dwight D. Eisenhower Highway =

The Dwight D. Eisenhower Highway is a designation carried by the following roads:

- Interstate 80 from San Francisco, California to I-25 in Cheyenne, Wyoming
- Interstate 25 from Cheyenne, Wyoming to I-270 in Denver, Colorado
- Interstate 270 (Colorado) from I-25 to I-70 in Denver, Colorado
- Interstate 70 from Denver, Colorado to I-270 in Frederick, Maryland
- Interstate 270 (Maryland) from Frederick, Maryland to the Capital Beltway
- Dwight D. Eisenhower National System of Interstate and Defense Highways
