= Ernest Holmes Sr. =

American automotive inventor and entrepreneur

Ernest W. Holmes Sr.
- Born: January 17, 1883; Hobbs Island, Alabama, U.S.
- Died: June 10, 1945 (aged 62); Chattanooga, Tennessee, U.S.
- Resting place: Forest Hills Cemetery, Chattanooga, Tennessee
- Occupations: Inventor, businessman
- Known for: Inventing the first wrecker, predecessor to the tow truck
- Spouse: Hattie Holmes (m. 1901–1945)
- Children: 3

Ernest W. Holmes Sr. (January 17, 1883– June 10, 1945) is the inventor of the tow truck. He founded Ernest Holmes Company and later served a term as a member of the Electric Power Board of Chattanooga and the American Society of Automotive Engineers.

== Biography ==
Holmes was born in Hobbs Island, Alabama.

The idea of the tow truck came after assisting a friend from business school, John Wiley, after Wiley's Model T flipped over into a ditch. Holmes modified his 1913 Cadillac to pull cars and transport them to his garage by affixing an iron chain, a pulley, and several poles to the back of his Cadillac. Holmes patented this idea on January 17, 1918.

The basis for Ernest Holmes Sr.'s patents was the concept of having a "split-boom" wrecker that could anchor the truck on one side, and retrieve from the other side without tilting the wrecker. This was especially useful when a wrecked vehicle had gone down a steep embankment.

A few wreckers were sold directly to the United States Government at the tail end of World War I, to be outfitted for military usage. They would be used in full force during the second World War where in which Holmes Co supplied the Allies with 6 to 7 thousand military tier wreckers. The regular wrecker was used in the American racing industry as it was the wrecker of choice for both NASCAR and IndyCar racing for multiple decades.

== Death ==
At 4 o'clock on the morning of June 10, 1945, he woke his wife feeling unwell and dying shortly after that at the age of 62. Doctors declared that he had suffered from what they called a "heart aliment". His oldest child, Ernest Holmes Jr. was then swiftly elected to take over control of Holmes Co. Holmes had said he would retire when he turned 65.

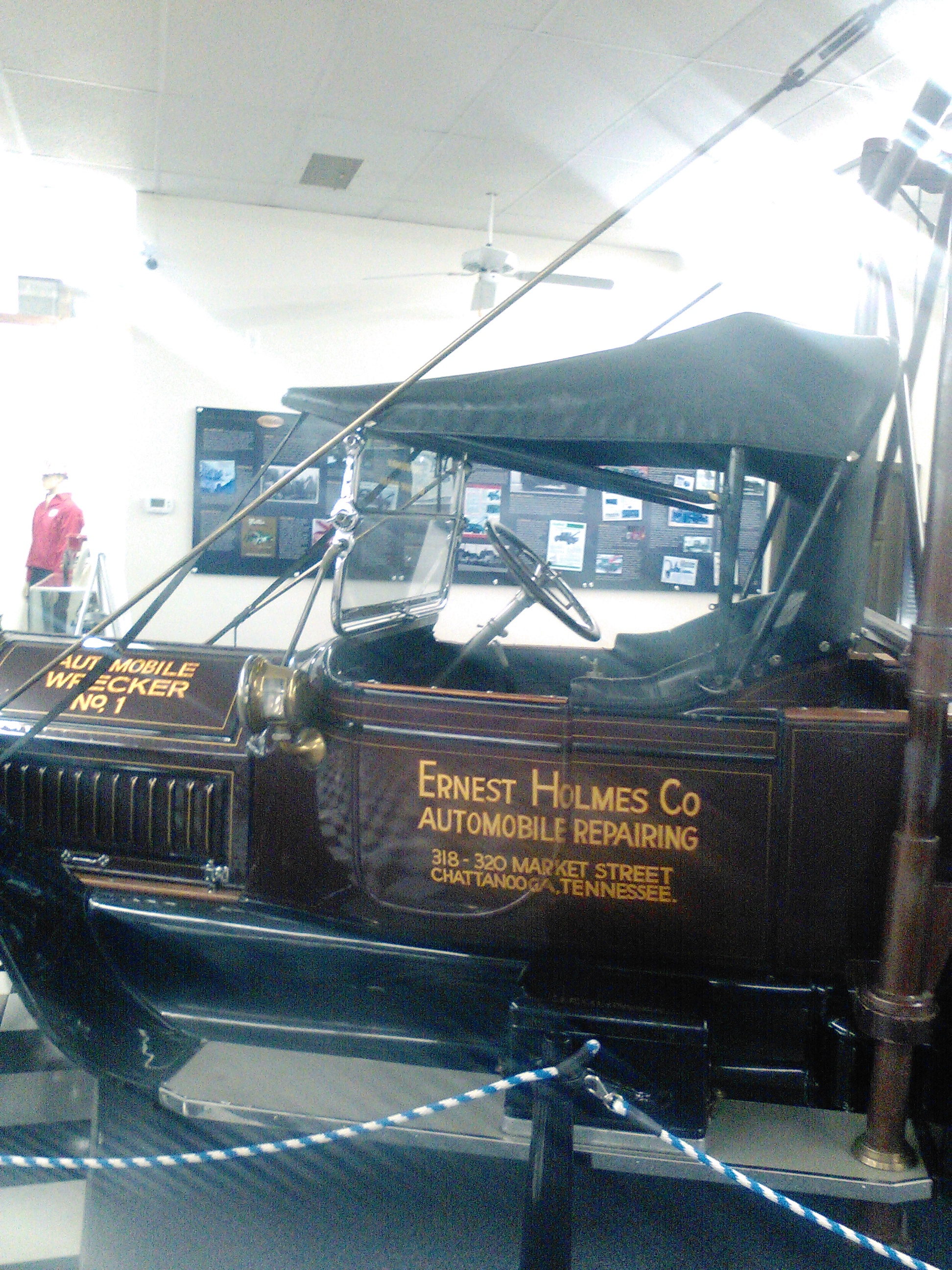
Replica of Ernest Holmes's original wrecker in the International Towing & Recovery Museum

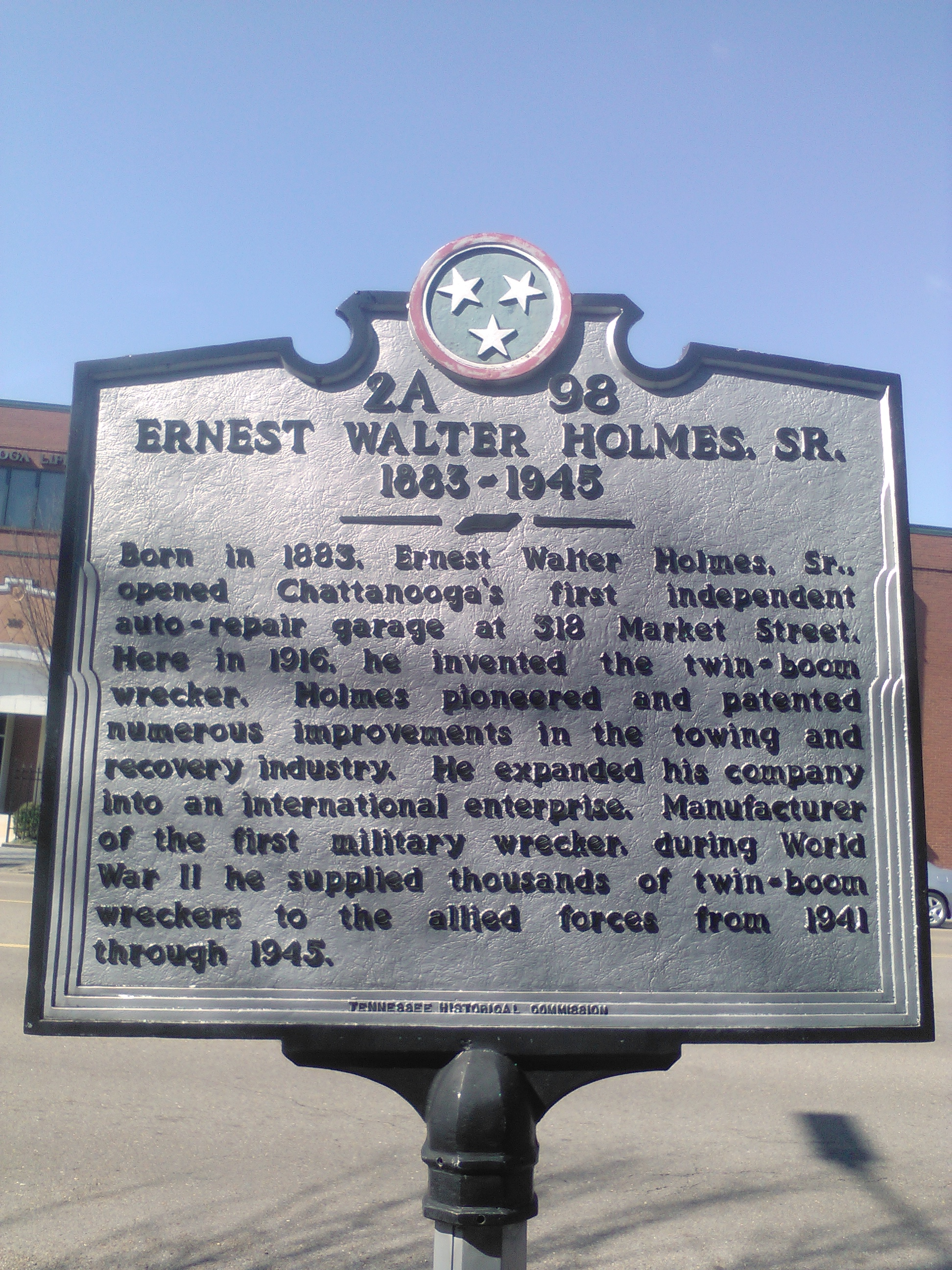
It is on the original site of Holmes's garage and later his workshop that assembled his wreckers

== Legacy ==
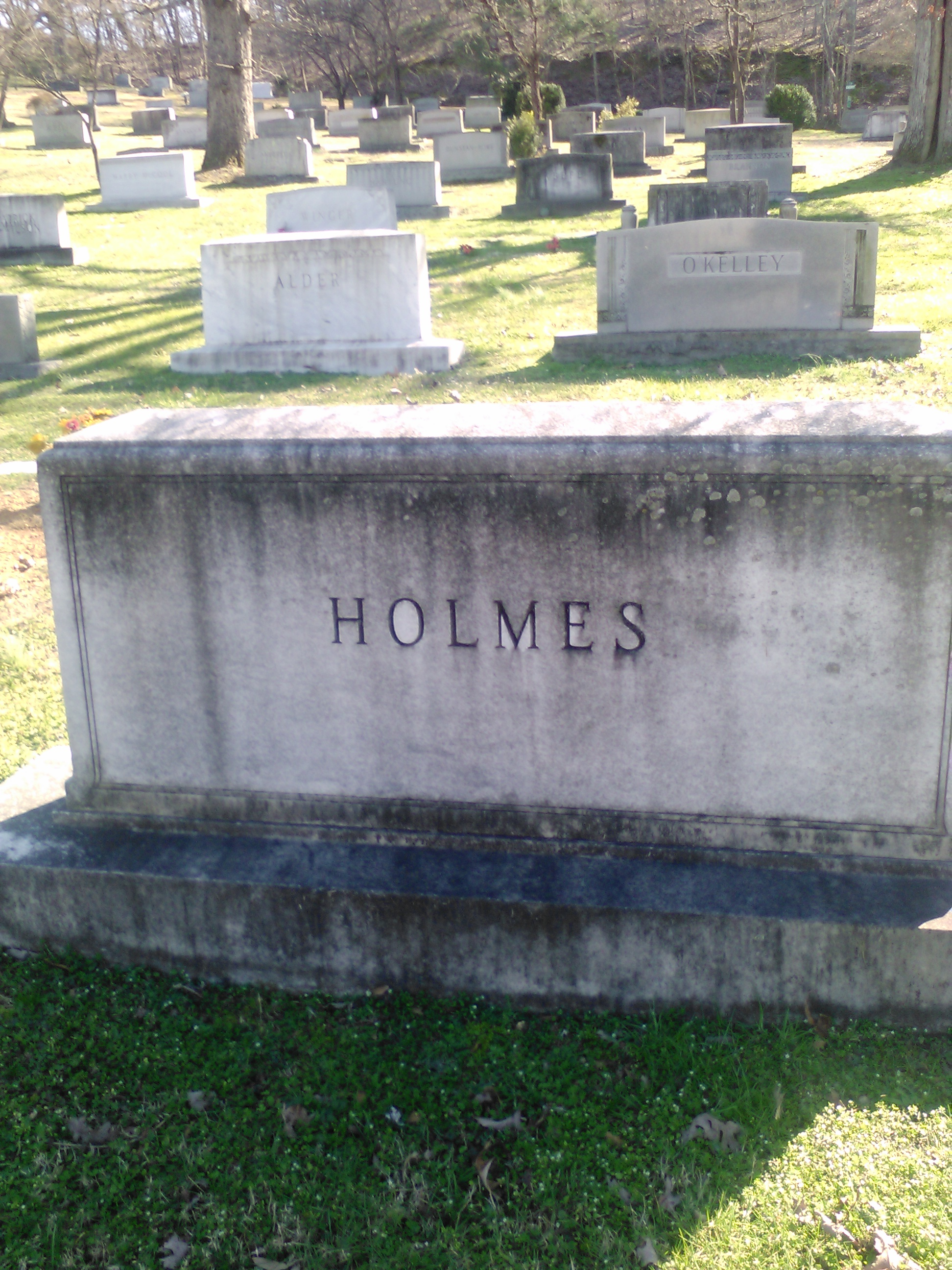
Holmes Family Headstone

Holmes' invention has become the leading vehicle in rescuing and transporting of vehicles that cannot be driven at the current time. The International Towing Museum was built in Chattanooga. It is a home to a collection and history of the tow truck and how it has evolved since its inception in the early 20th century. What was left of the Ernest Holmes Company, at that time owned by Dover, transformed into Miller Industries under the supervisor of his son Mildred Holmes. Miller Industries is headquartered in Ooltewah, TN.
