= Tow truck =

Truck used to move motor vehicles

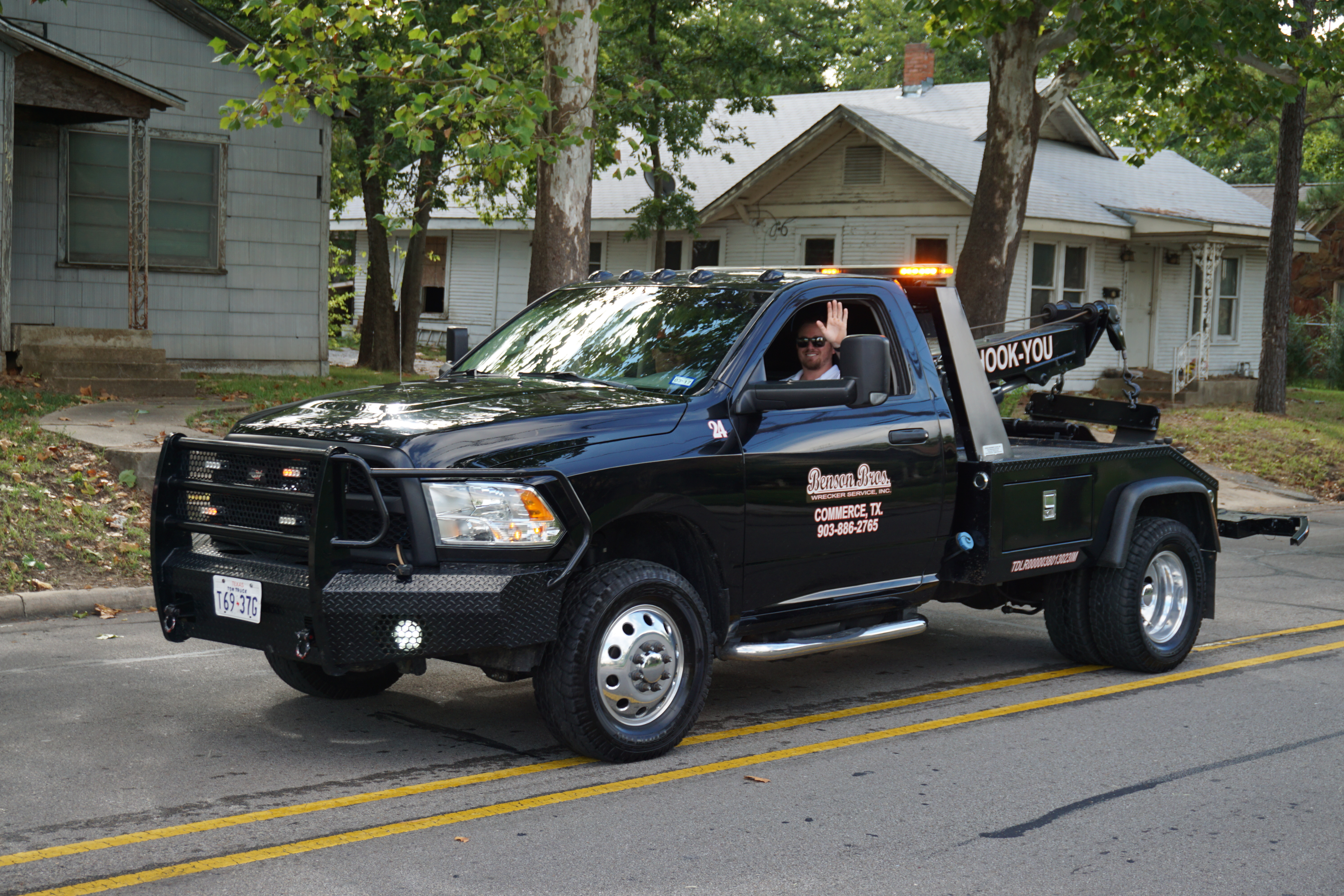
A modern Ram tow truck

A tow truck (also called a wrecker, a breakdown truck, recovery vehicle or a breakdown lorry) is a truck used to move disabled, improperly parked, impounded, or otherwise indisposed motor vehicles. This may involve recovering a vehicle damaged in an accident, returning one to a drivable surface in a mishap or inclement weather, or towing or transporting one via flatbed to a repair shop or other location. They serve important roles, helping with breakdowns, accidents, and moving vehicles.

Tow trucks are specially designed to haul vehicles of various sizes, including those as large as semi-trailer trucks. They are different from car carrier trailers, which are intended for the routine transport of multiple new or used vehicles rather than emergency recovery or roadside assistance.

== History ==
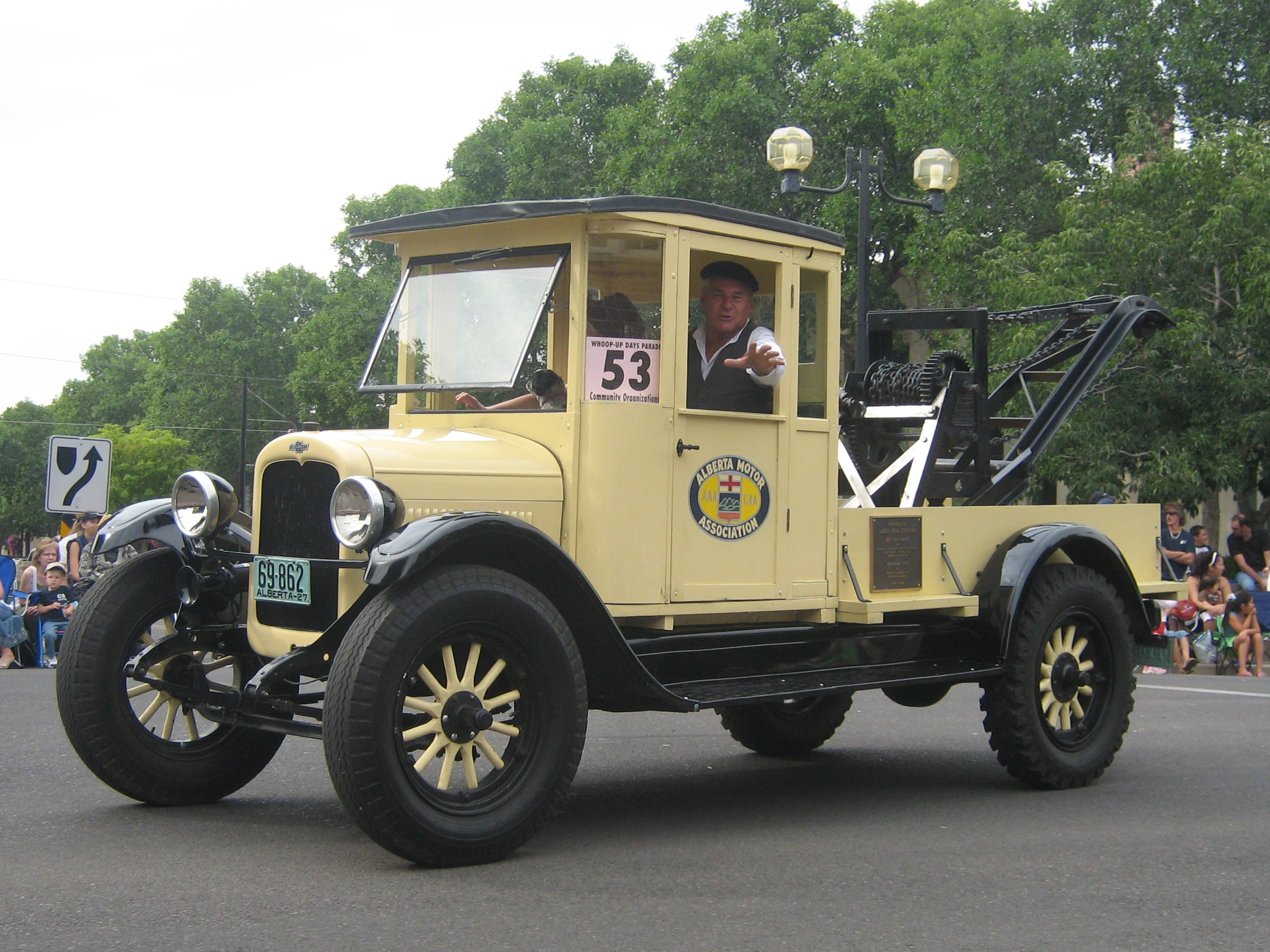
A 1920 Chevrolet tow truck

Ferdinand Porsche of Austro-Daimler developed an artillery tractor for the Austro-Hungarian army in 1908, the M 08. One of the batch was constructed as a recovery vehicle for the others, with a large winch on the rear platform.

The wrecker (with lifting jib) was invented in 1916 by Ernest Holmes Sr. of Chattanooga, Tennessee, a garage worker who was inspired after he needed blocks, ropes, and six men to pull a car out of a creek. After improving his design he began manufacturing them commercially. The International Towing and Recovery Hall of Fame and Museum in his home town displays restored antique wreckers, tools, equipment, and pictorial histories of motor-vehicle towing, a type of work that Holmes originated.

== Types of towing equipment ==
Five general types of tow truck are in common usage, usually based on the type or size of vehicle to be towed:

- Boom: uses an adjustable boom with a winch to recover vehicles from a ditch, over an embankment, or any place the vehicle cannot be safely reached by backing up. Some booms are fixed; some use heavy pivoting A-frames; others are equipped with hydraulic-powered telescopic cylinders. The heaviest types of boom can rotate, effectively turning the tow truck into a sort of mobile crane, called a "rotator", and are usually reserved for incidents involving heavy vehicles. In the past, boom trucks used a "hook and chain" system where chains are looped around the vehicle frame or axle, then lifted by a boom winch. A towbar with heavy rubberized mats connects the truck and vehicle, so it can be towed on its other axle. "Slings" and "belt lifts" are a further development, with rubber straps replacing part of the chains. Slings are not used much today because they can scratch the bumpers of cars. However, they are sometimes used for towing vehicles that have been in an accident or have one or two of the front or rear wheels missing, or for pickup trucks and other vehicles that have steel bumpers. Cars equipped with all-wheel drive cannot be towed with a sling, as it can cause problems with the car's drivetrain.
- Wheel-lift (also called a "spectacle lift" or "underlift"): developed from the hook-and-chain technology to produce a large metal yoke that can be fitted under the front or rear wheels to cradle them, drawing the front or rear end of the vehicle clear of the ground by a pneumatic or hydraulic hoist so it can be towed. This apparatus generally picks up the drive wheels of the vehicle (i.e. the front wheels if it is front-wheel drive, the rear wheels if it is rear-wheel drive), touching only the tires. The wheel lift was designed by Arthur W. Nelson of Weld Built Body Co. in 1967. The name spectacle lift is common in the UK; the cradle resembles a pair of squared spectacles (eyeglasses). Medium and heavy trucks use a variation, the "underlift" or "chassis lift", which lifts the axle or frame instead of the wheels. Wheel-lift trucks can have adapters which can also lift the chassis.
- Integrated (also called a "self-loader", "snatcher", "quick pick" or "repo truck"): boom and wheel-lift integrated into one unit. Used in light-duty trucks to repossess vehicles or move illegally parked vehicles. Most have controls for the apparatus inside the cab of the tow truck to make quick pickup possible without the inconvenience of exiting the truck to hook up the vehicle. Though similar to a wheel-lift truck, an integrated truck differs in that the end of its boom features movable arms that can more easily and quickly clamp onto the wheels of a vehicle, often controlled from the cabin of the truck. On a wheel-lift truck, the wheels of a vehicle must be manually secured to the yoke by the operator before being lifted. There are also heavy-duty trucks manufactured with integrated lifts.
- Flatbed (also called a "rollback", "slide" or "tilt tray"): the entire back of the truck is fitted with a bed that can be hydraulically inclined and slid back to ground level, allowing the vehicle to be placed on it under its own power or pulled on by a winch. Because they carry rather than tow the vehicle, they can be used on a completely immobile vehicle; in the US, they are used to carry badly damaged cars from crashes.
- Lift flatbed: a boom uses a wheel-lift frame to lift the vehicle vertically and load it on the bed. This type of truck can remove vehicles that are parallel-parked. It is commonly used in Europe.

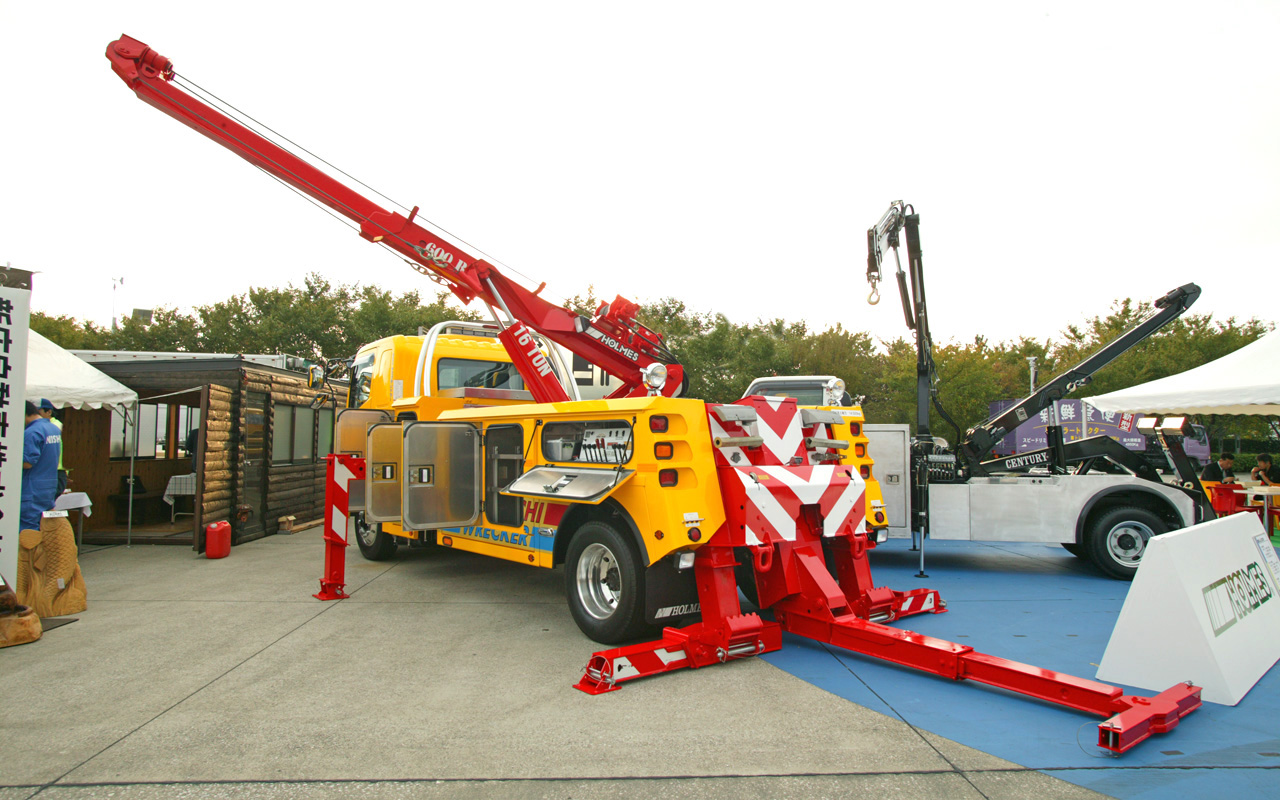
Boom truck with underlift

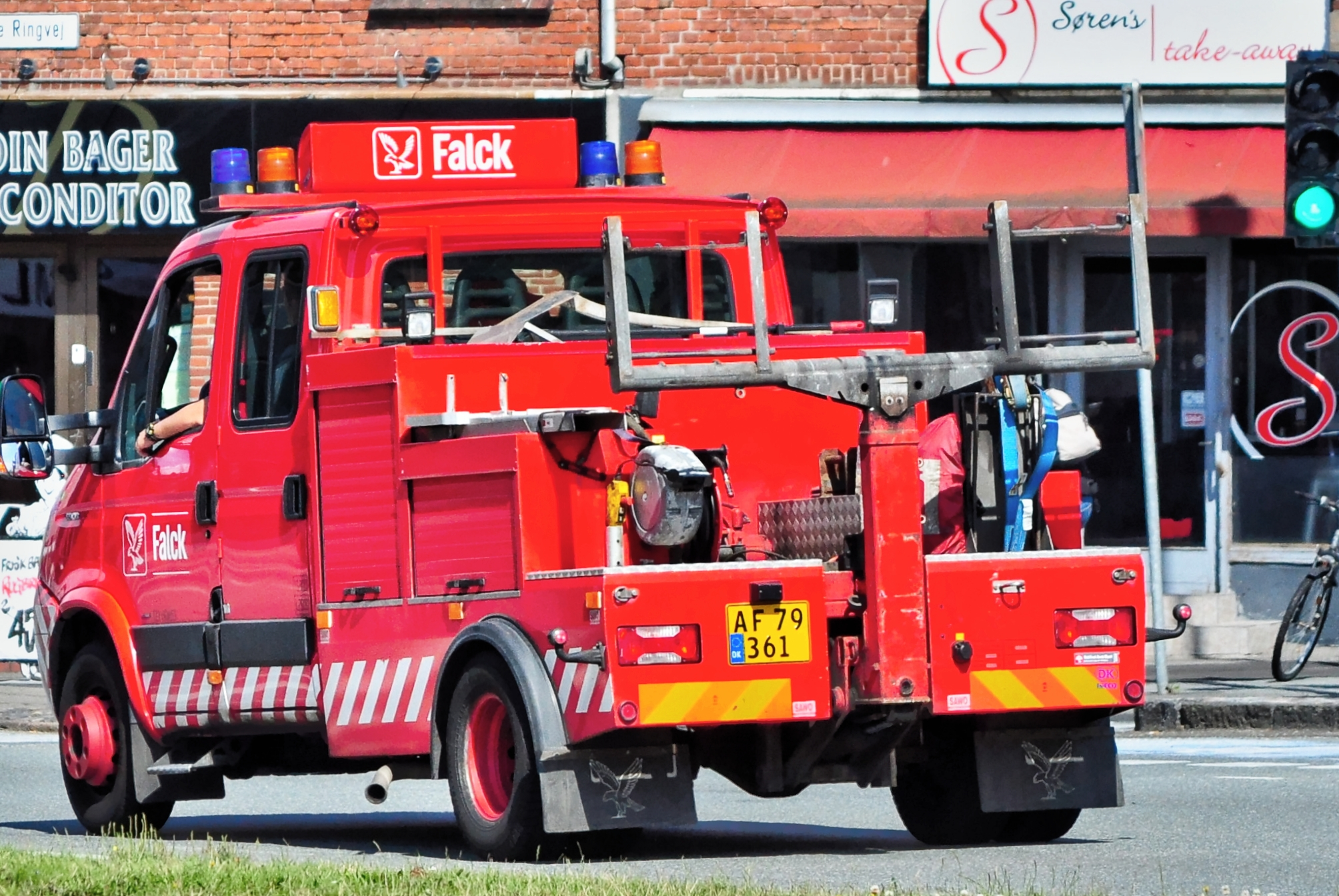
Wheel-lift tow truck

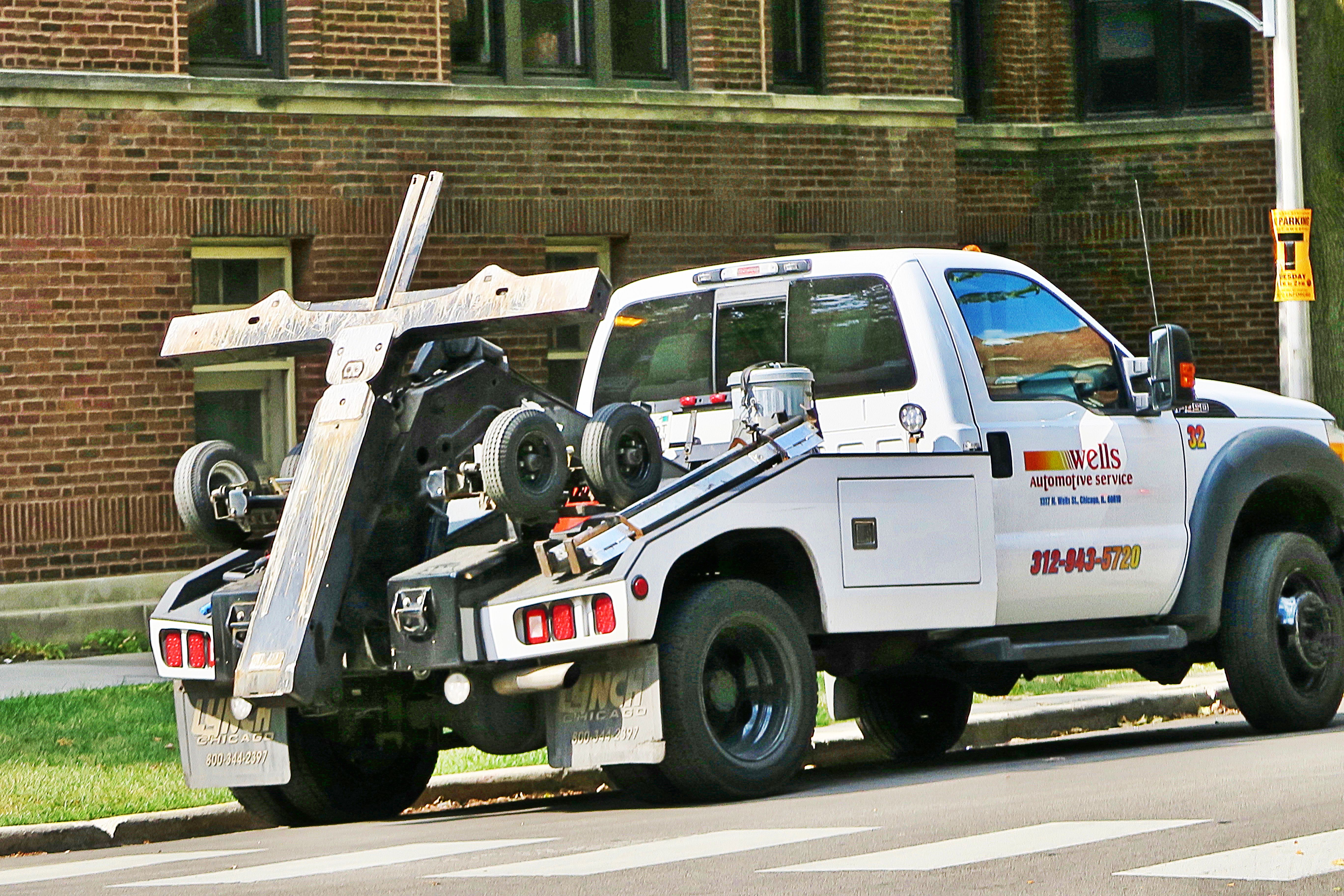
Integrated tow truck

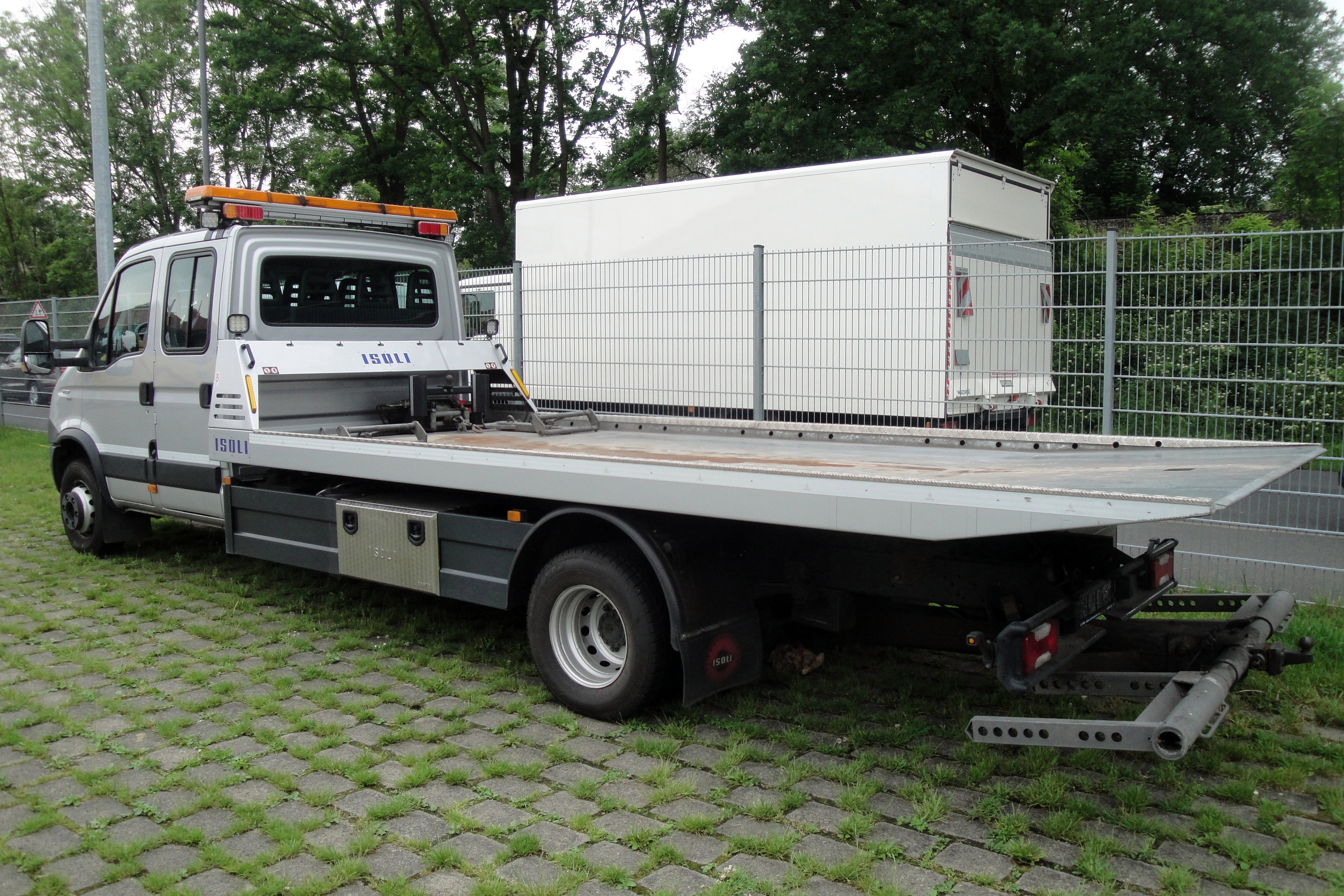
Flatbed with wheel-lift

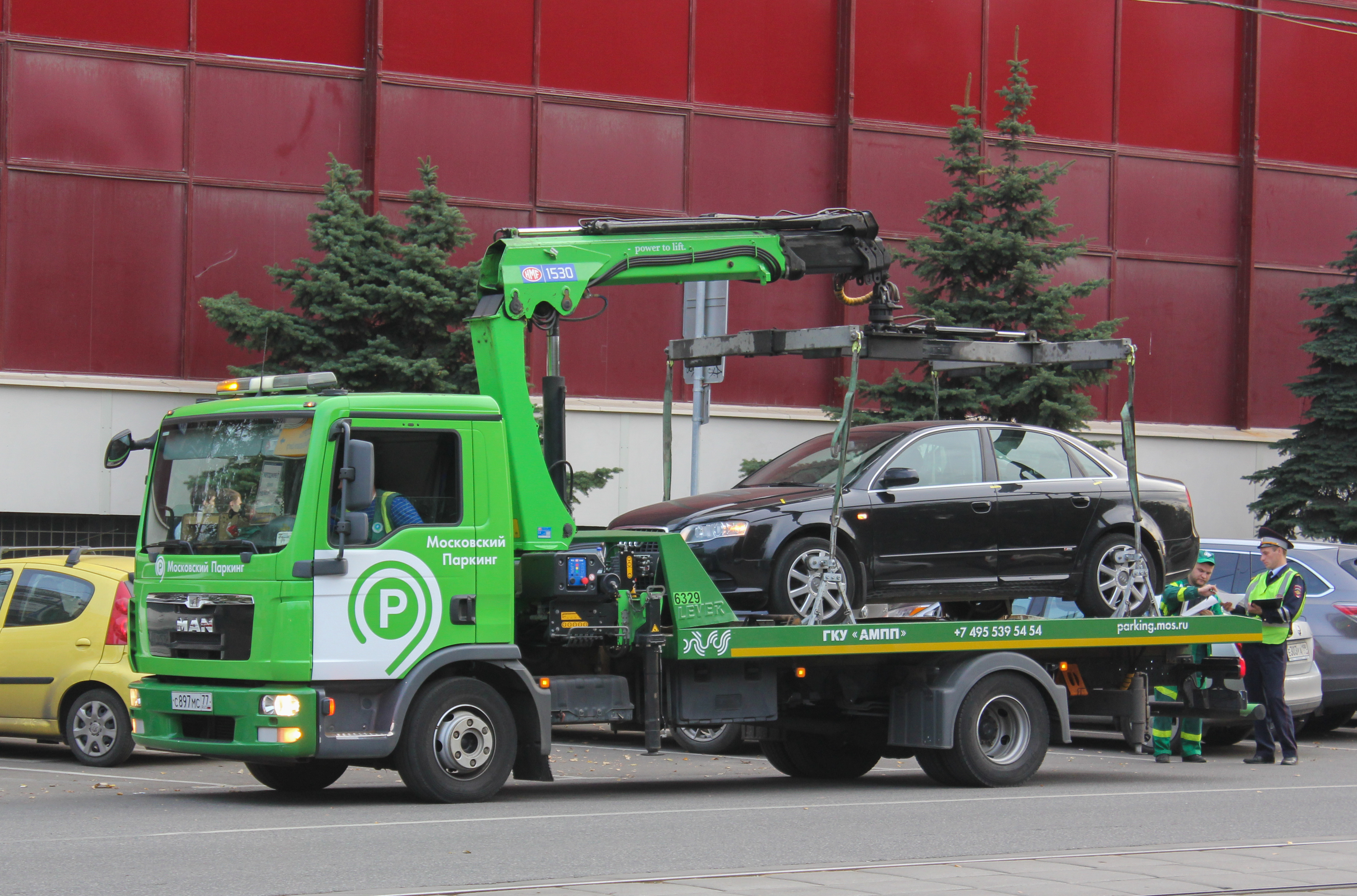
Lift flatbed

These are the most common arrangements; others also exist, such as flatbed units that offer a wheel-lift, boom trucks that can recover but not tow, and wheel-lift units that offer a combination boom with sling.

There are also several sizes and weight categories of tow truck. The lightest models are usually based on light truck and van chassis offering boom and tow weights of around 5 to 10 short tons (4.5–9.1 metric tons), making them ideal for car towing. Medium-duty tow trucks have a boom capacity of 15 to 20 short tons (14–18 metric tons). Heavy-duty tow trucks, based on chassis used by semi-trucks, with multiple axles and the ability to tow fully loaded semi-truck and trailer combinations, have a boom capacity from 25 to 50 short tons (23–45 metric tons). Rotators are the heaviest type of tow truck, ranging from 40 to 75 short tons (36–68 metric tons) (though lighter models do exist) and often come with many other features per customer specification.

Most flatbed-type vehicles are based on medium-duty and heavy-duty trucks to provide the chassis strength necessary to carry entire vehicles.

== Operations ==
Tow trucks are usually operated by private businesses, except for major highways and toll roads, where the road authority may operate the tow trucks for that stretch of road. Some police departments own tow trucks; in the US, however, it is common to contract police tows to private companies. Businesses who operate a large fleet of vehicles, such as school bus companies or package delivery services, often own one or several tow trucks for the purposes of towing their own vehicles. Government departments with large fleets (such as the police departments, fire departments, transportation authorities and departments of public works of major cities) may similarly own one or more tow trucks. Police department tow trucks may also be used to impound other vehicles. Heavy tow trucks are often called to clear semi-truck accidents and straighten out jackknifed trucks. In rural or unorganized areas, companies which operate tow trucks can sometimes also offer additional services appropriate to highway clearance where government-provided ones are unavailable, such as fire suppression.

The military also deploys tow trucks for recovery of stranded vehicles. In the US Army, a variant of the HEMTT truck is used for this purpose, the M984 wrecker. For recovery in combat situations while under fire, many armies with large vehicle fleets also deploy armoured recovery vehicles. These vehicles fulfill a similar role, but are resistant to heavy fire and capable of traversing rough terrain with their tracks, as well as towing vehicles beyond the weight limits of wheeled wreckers, such as tanks (many are based on tank designs for this reason).

Each state and territory of Australia has its own regulations and acts for the operation of tow trucks. Tow trucks are generally divided into two categories, either by standard, trade and private towing or accident towing. Accident towing tow trucks are clearly identifiable by number plates ending in either "ATT" or "TT". Tow trucks that are not endorsed for accident towing may use general number plates of any combination pursuant to each state's own registering system. An example of a statute regulating the operation of tow trucks and towing companies in Victoria is the Victorian Accident Towing Services Act.

Some jurisdictions may allow tow trucks to be considered as emergency vehicles, and use sirens, with the State of Missouri being a notable example.

Heavy trucks working on a recovery

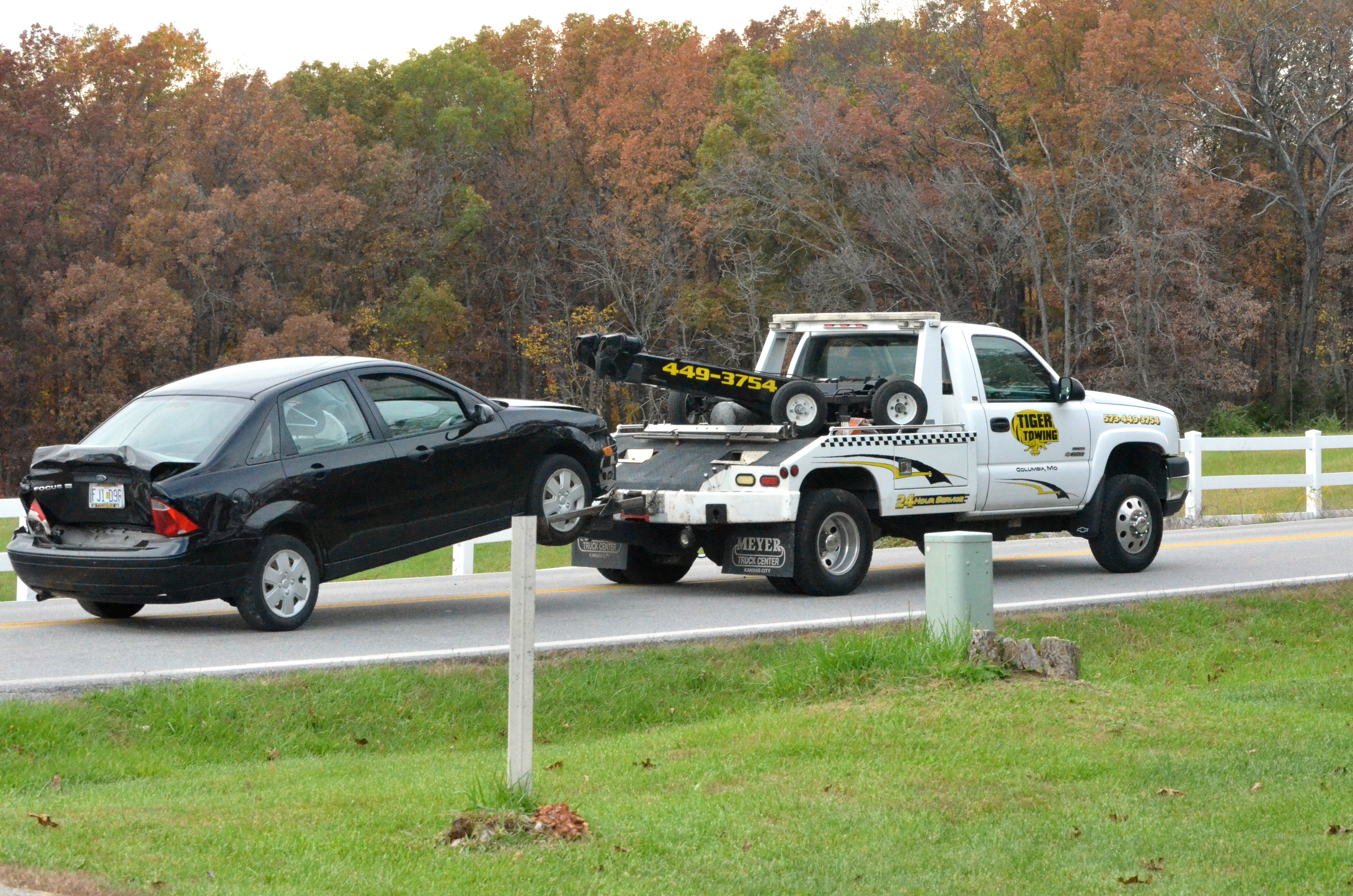
A wheel-lift truck towing a damaged Ford Focus

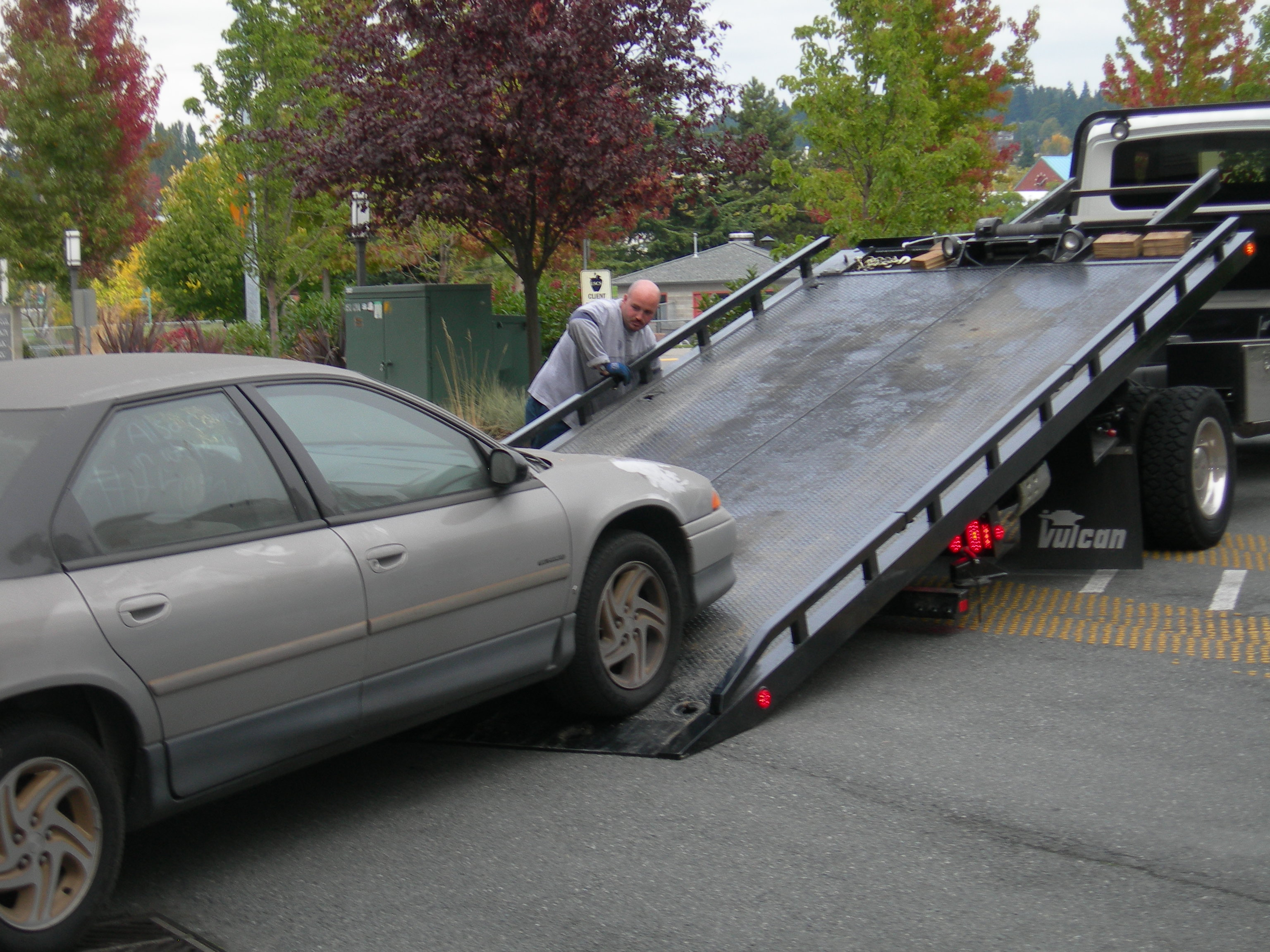
Loading a flatbed with a winch

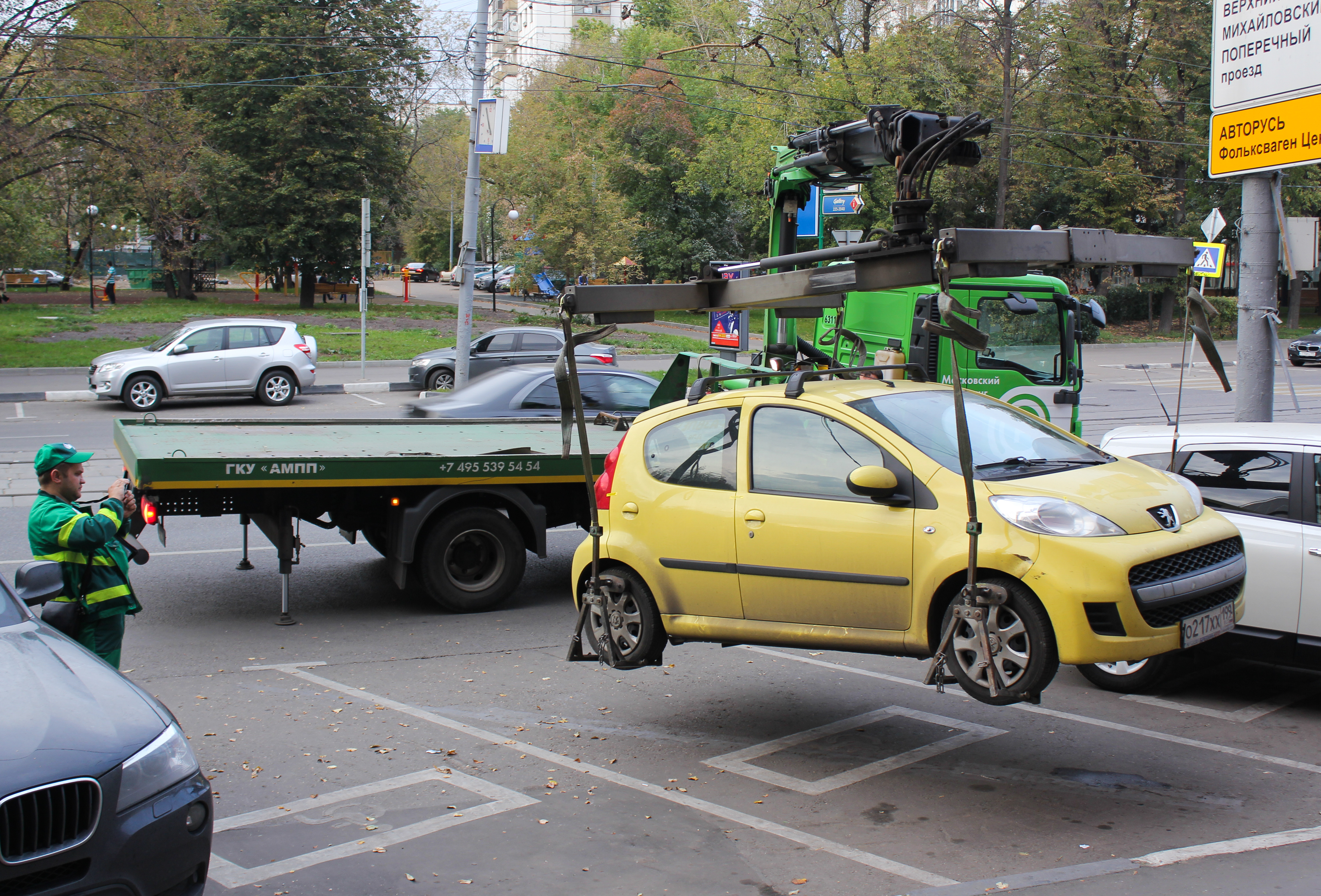
An improperly-parked car being recovered with a boom tow truck in Moscow.

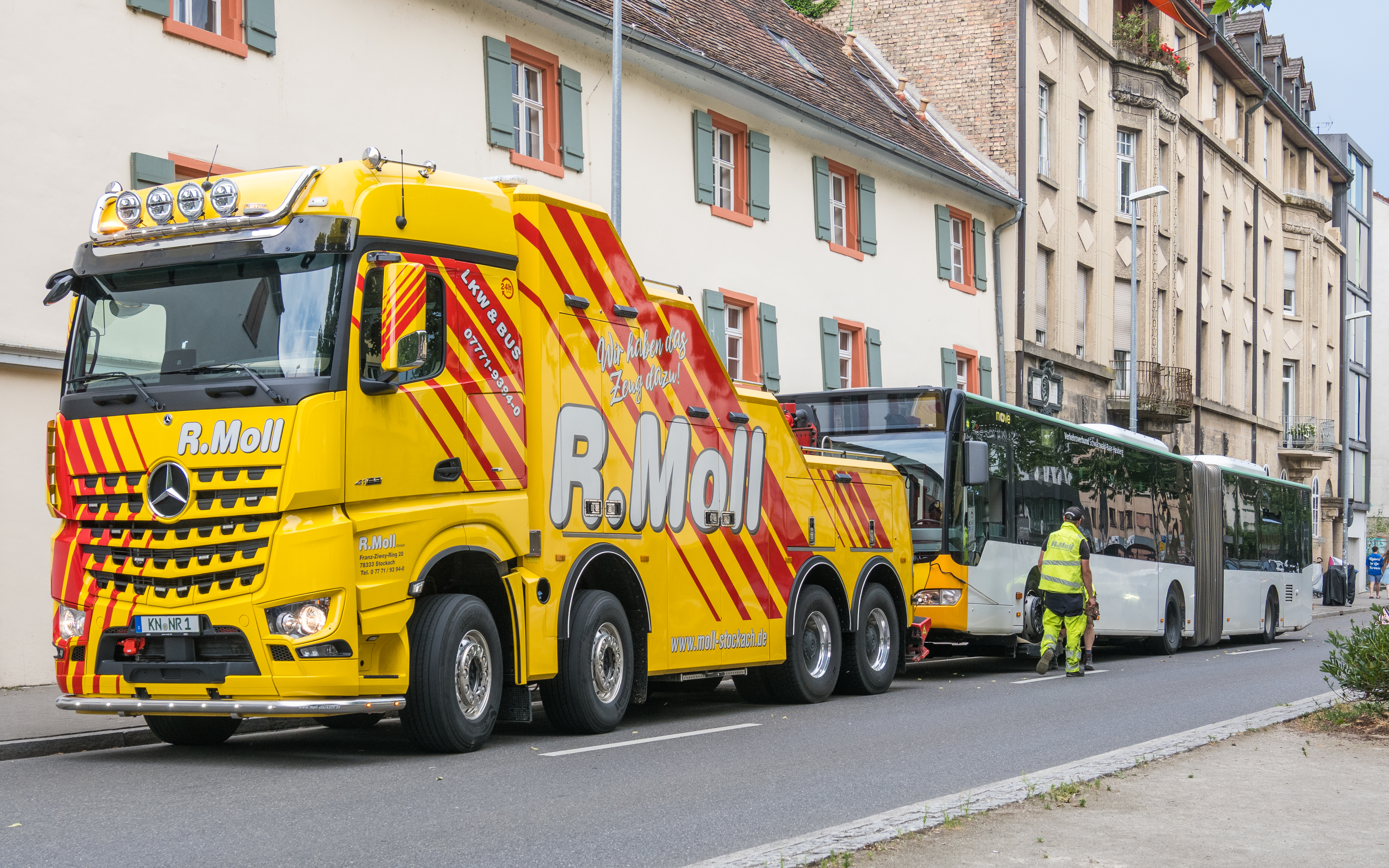
Heavy tow truck recovering a articulated bus in Constance

== See also ==
- Armored recovery vehicle
- Impounded vehicle auction
- Motor carrier
- Roadside assistance
- Tow hitch
- Vehicle recovery
