= Roads in North Korea =

Roads in North Korea are classified into seven levels: motorways, and roads from level 1 to 6. Roads are the secondary means of transport in North Korea, after rail transport. The road network is underdeveloped. Roads are generally in poor condition, are little used and only a small part of the network is paved.

Main roads in North Korea in 2009

== History ==
=== General overview ===
The development of the road network in North Korea began after the Korean War (1950-1953).

The road network is divided into three main routes: east coast, west coast and east-west link. The low financial resources and the mountainous terrain have placed severe constraints on the development of the road system. Roads are generally underdeveloped, due to restrictions on travel, fuel problems and the near-absence of private cars.

=== Road construction ===
The roads were restored in the 1950s after being damaged during the Korean War, then the 1960s saw the creation of paved roads around the centre of Pyongyang. In the 1970s many expressways were built, followed by the 1980s when a network for Tourist Transport emerged, the 1990s continued this policy and added roads for the country's Special Economic Zones.

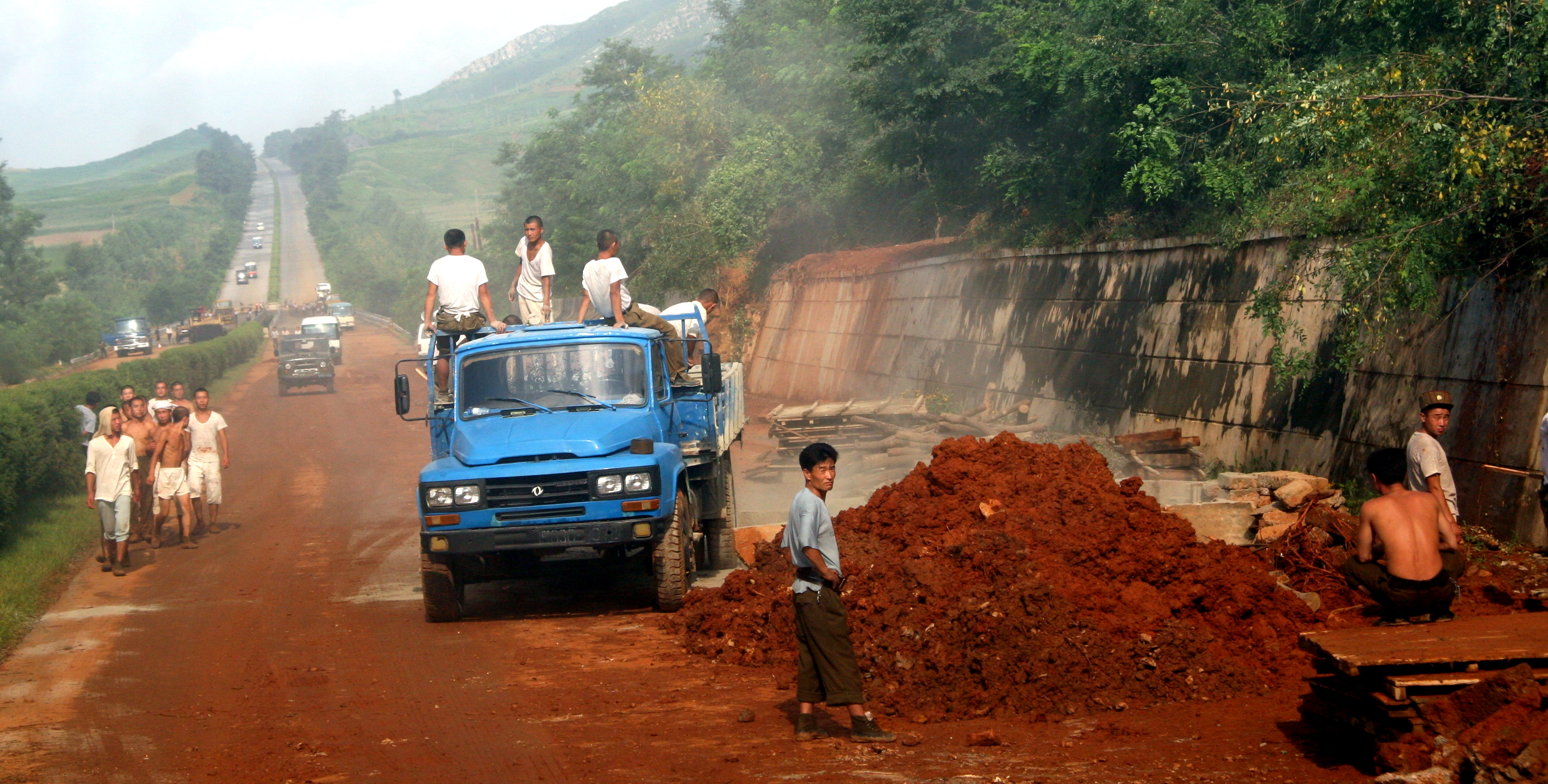
Road construction in North Korea. The blue truck in the foreground is a Chinese Dongfeng Motors truck.

The leader Kim Il-sung announced that: "The purpose of the roads was to solve the problem of traffic in remote mountain areas and to enable agricultural equipment to reach cultivated land. But roads must not be built on cultivated land. It is totally unacceptable to turn farmland into a road".

Students have been involved in road construction projects since the 1960s. Kim Il-sung took part in the widening of a road between the centre of Pyongyang and a district to the north-east of the capital, a distance of around 16 kilometres. This experience was then presented by Kim Il-sung as a model for student participation in construction projects.

For the construction of the Pyongyang–Nampo Motorway, North Korea mobilised the population on a massive scale, calling on students, office workers and labourers to take part. Much of the work was carried out by hand.

=== Maintenance and management ===
In 1978, a specialised road agency was set up.

Members of the Workers' Party, workers and the army build and maintain the roads.

Class 5 and 6 roads are maintained by cooperative farms and state-run farms. In addition, the entire population is mobilised two weeks a year, during "road lovers' week", and takes part in road maintenance.

== Classification system ==
In 1949, a regulation on the management of roads established the creation of 5 categories for roads: expressways and other roads with levels from 1 to 4.

On 10 February 1964, the 4-level system was reformed into 6 levels, to improve the organisation of road management and maintenance. Since 1964, roads in North Korea have been divided into seven categories: motorways and six levels of general roads.

State of roads in North Korea by category
Classification	Role	Number of lanes	Width of lane (m)	Shoulder width (m)	Width of carriageway (m)	Platform width (m)	Traffic (vehicles/day)	Management body
Motorways	Roads of particular importance	4 or more	3,5 to 4	1,5 to 4,0	14,0 or more	17,0 or more	5500 or more	National (Government)
Road level 1	Capital-Province	2 or more	3,5	1,5 or more	7,0 or more	10,0 or more	5500 or more	National (Government)
Road level 2	Province-Province	2	3,5	1	7	9	2500 to 5500	National (Government)
Road level 3	Province-County/ County-village (and/or County-County?)	2	3	0,75	6	7,5	800 to 2500	National (Government)
Road level 4	County-village (military roads)	2	2,75	0,5	6	6,5	300 to 800	Province
Road level 5	Village-Village	2	2,5	—	5	5	150 to 300	Province or County
Road level 6	Village-Hamlet	1	—	—	3,0 to 3,5	3,0 to 3,5	—	Province or Village

Composition of the roadbed: shoulders + carriageway.

== Road characteristics ==
North Korea's road network has been shaped by the strong geographical constraints and topographical features of its territory.

Generally speaking, main roads have two lanes or less, they are not smooth and have many potholes. Road quality is poor. Infrastructures such as bridges and tunnels are highly exposed to the risk of flooding, and bridges are sometimes washed away. Road safety infrastructure is lacking.

The general level 1 roads are not paved and have no sewers or street lighting.

It is difficult for cars to pass each other on general roads, as the carriageway is 3 metres wide, so if two cars pass each other, there are only 15 centimetres on each side.

Roads in North Korea in 2020s will be comparable to South Korean roads in the 1970s.

=== Number of kilometres and paving ===
There is a lack of accurate and reliable data on the extent and surfacing of roads in North Korea. This leads to discrepancies between the various figures used by researchers on the subject.

In 1988, North Korea announced that its road infrastructure was 75,500 km long. The South Koreans, applying their standards, estimated this network at between 25,000 and 30,000 km. In fact, the North Koreans include farm roads in this calculation, which is excluded by the South Koreans.

In 1999, the road network was estimated at around 31,200 km of which 1717 km are paved.

In 2006, The World Factbook published by the Central Intelligence Agency listed 25554 km of roads, 724 km of which were paved.

In 2016, the road network is estimated at 26176 km, or 25% of the length of the road network in South Korea.

In 2019, according to Statistics Korea, there were 26,180 km of roads, or 23% of the South Korean road network. Excluding motorways, 10% of roads are paved.

== Role in transport ==
The road infrastructure is poorly developed in North Korea. Roads have a secondary, supporting role compared to rail transport.

== Motorways ==
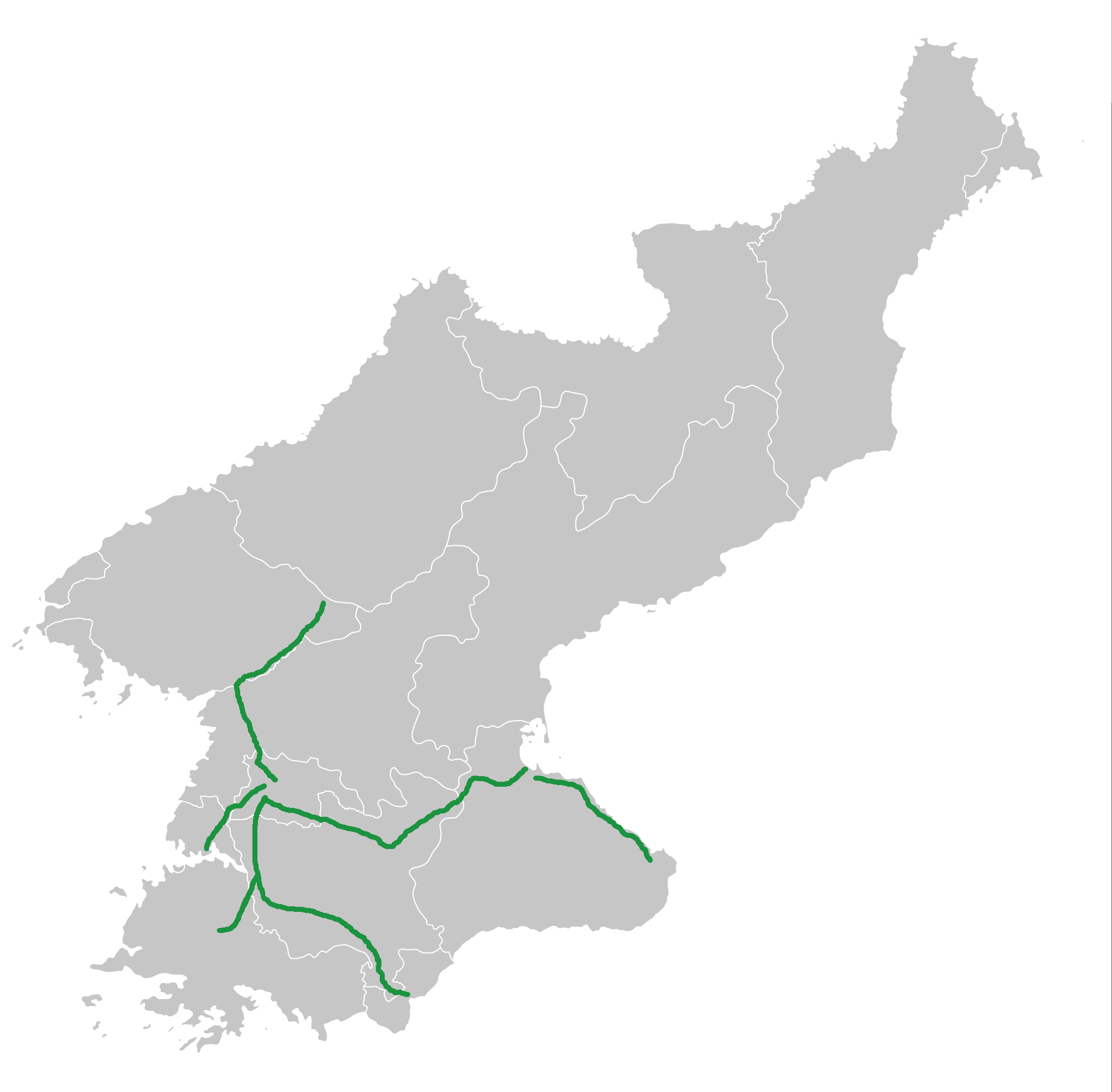
Map of motorways in North Korea in 2014

North Korea has six motorways stretching 660 km, including three major multi-lane motorways:

- the Pyongyang-Wonsan Motorway, a 196 km four-lane expressway, opened in 1978, linking Pyongyang and Wonsan.
- The Pyongyang-Nampo Motorway, a 43 km four-lane expressway between Pyongyang and Nampo, opened in 2000.
- the Pyongyang-Kaesong motorway, a 100 km four-lane motorway linking Pyongyang and Kaesong, opened in 1992.

The country's first motorway, the Pyongyang-Nampo Motorway, was built in 1978. The first tolls were installed on the Pyongyang-Wonsan motorway in 2018.

North Korean motorway views

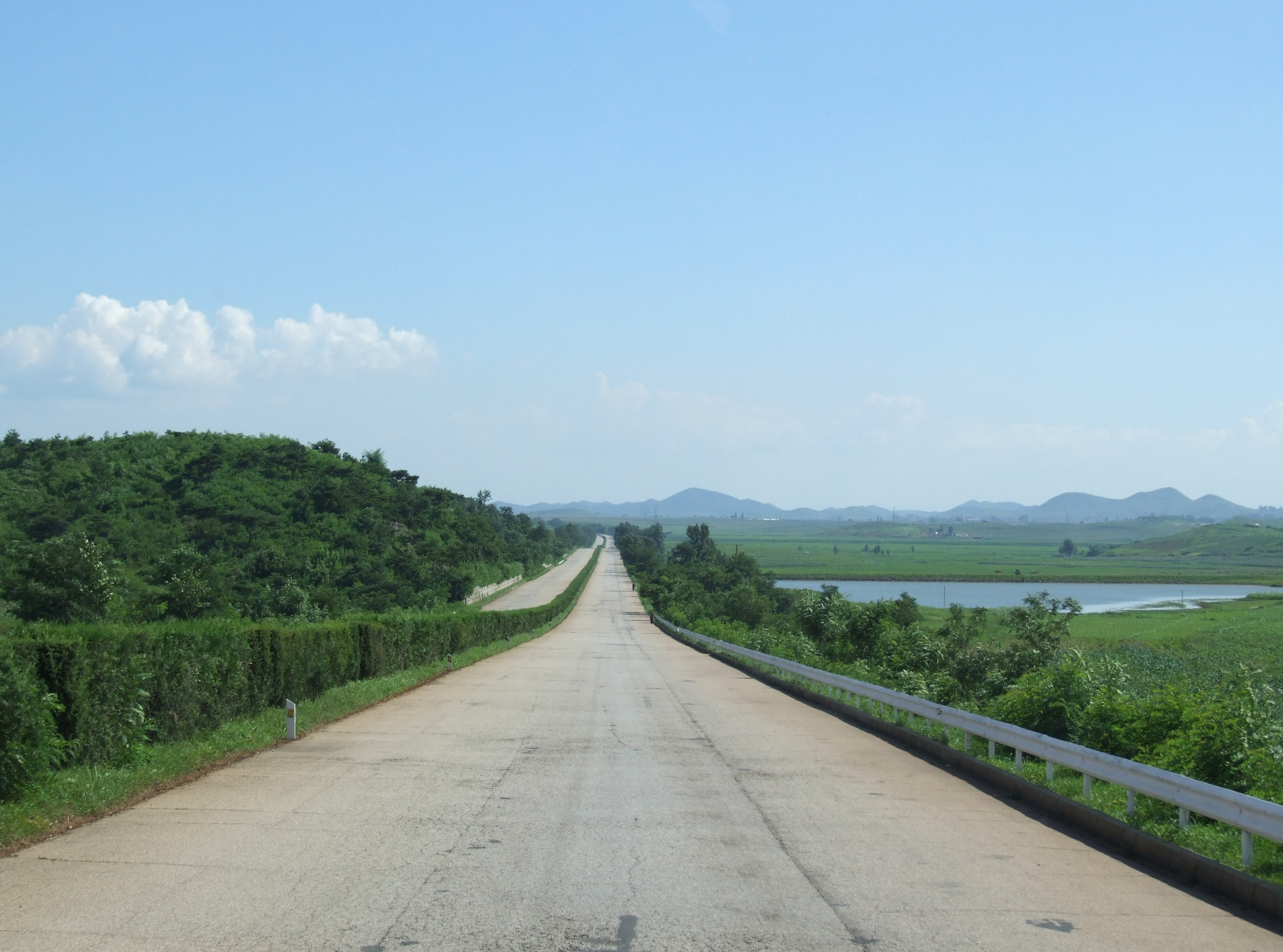
Pyongyang-Kaesong motorway

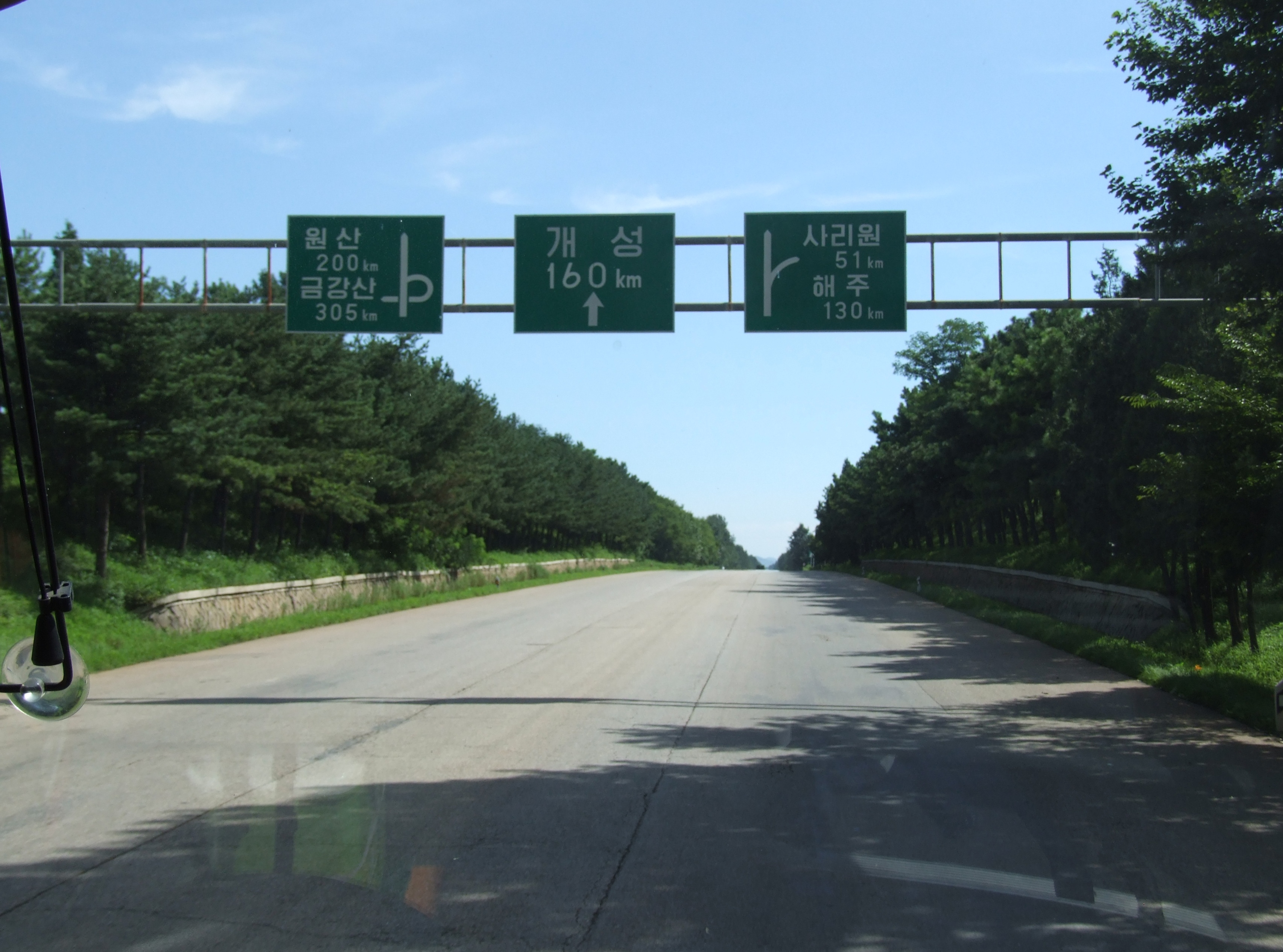
Direction sign on the Pyongyang-Kaesong motorway

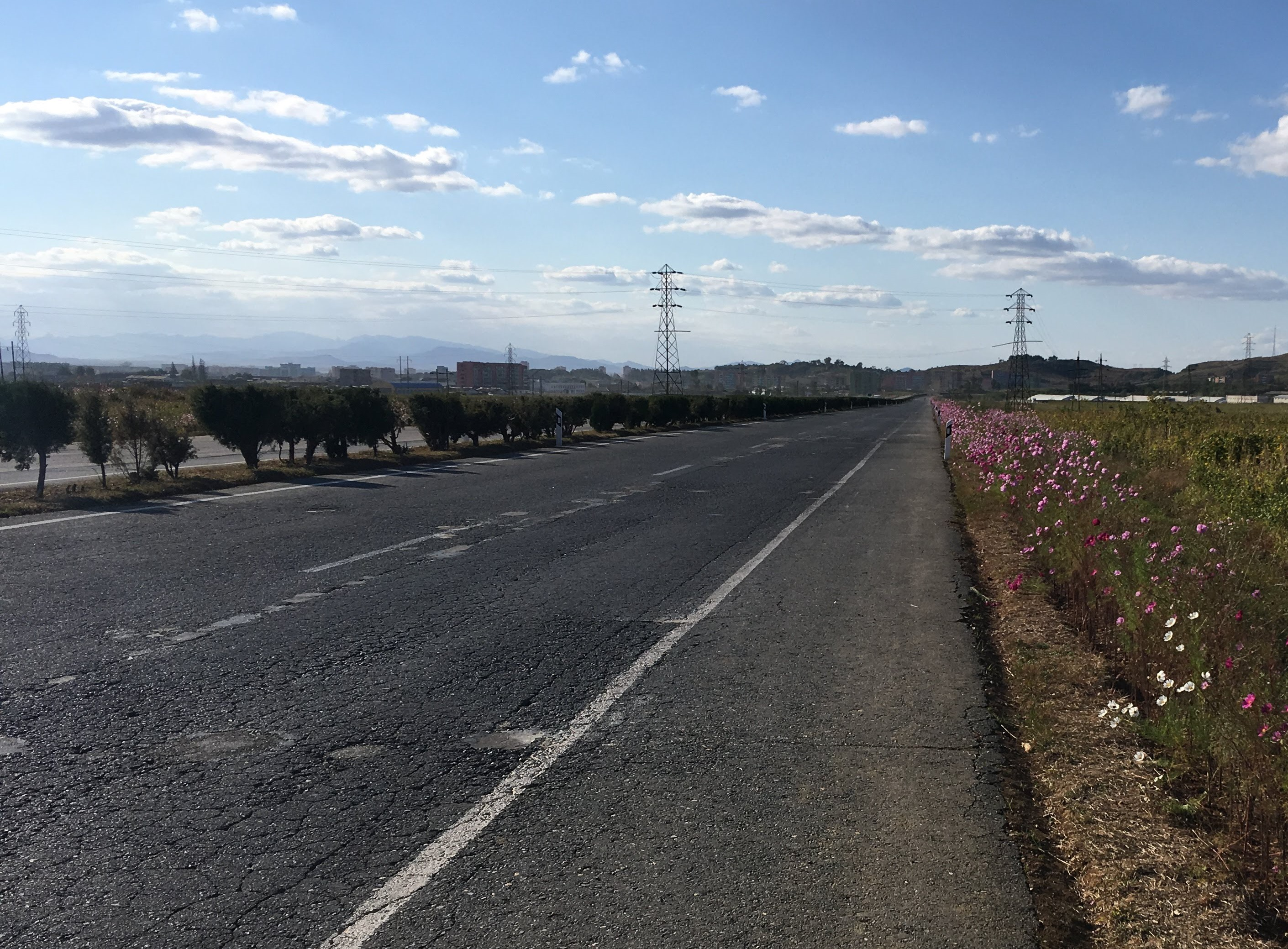
Pyongyang-Kaesong motorway near Sariwon

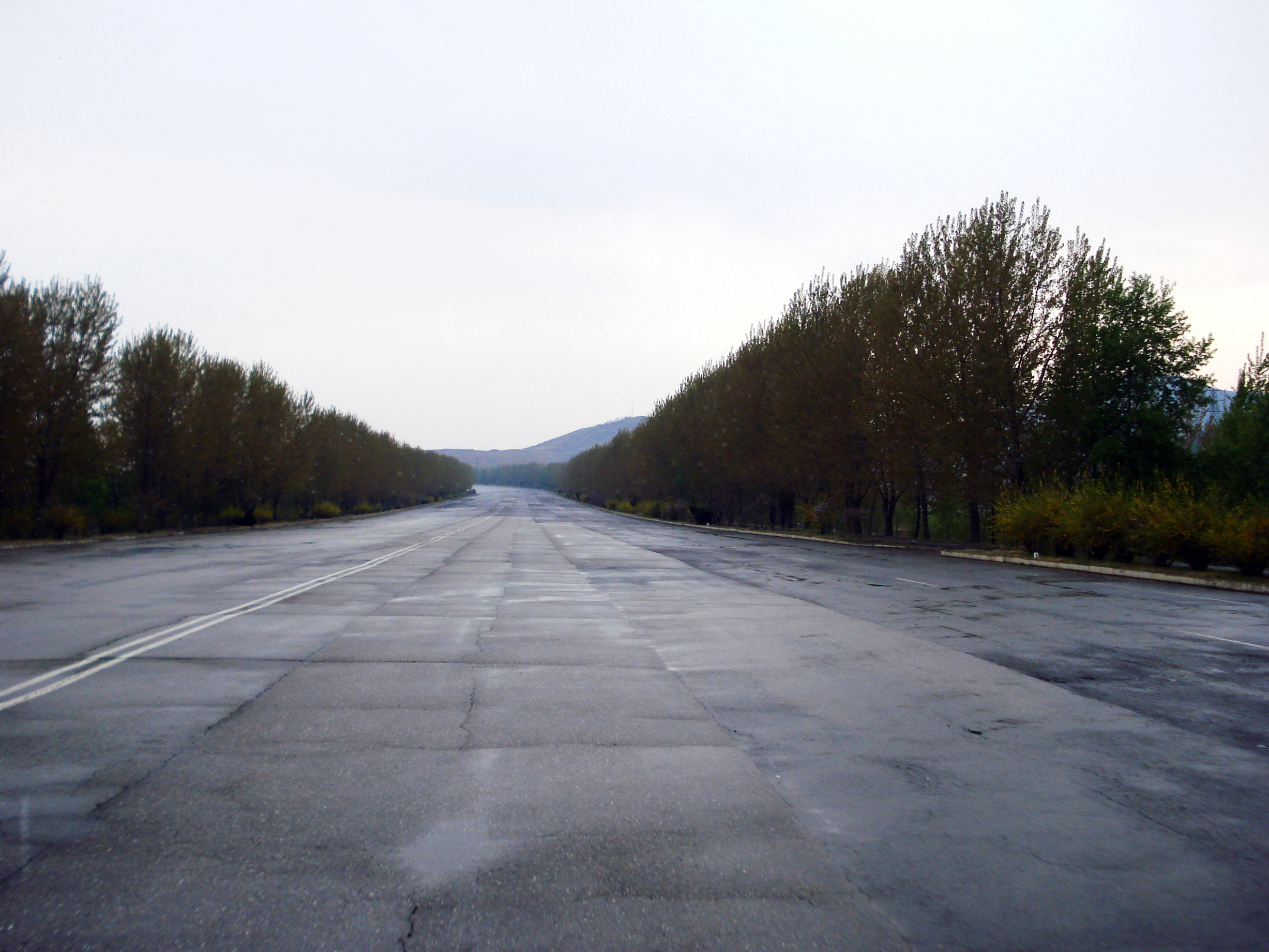
Motorway from Pyongyang to Nampo

=== Asian Highway ===
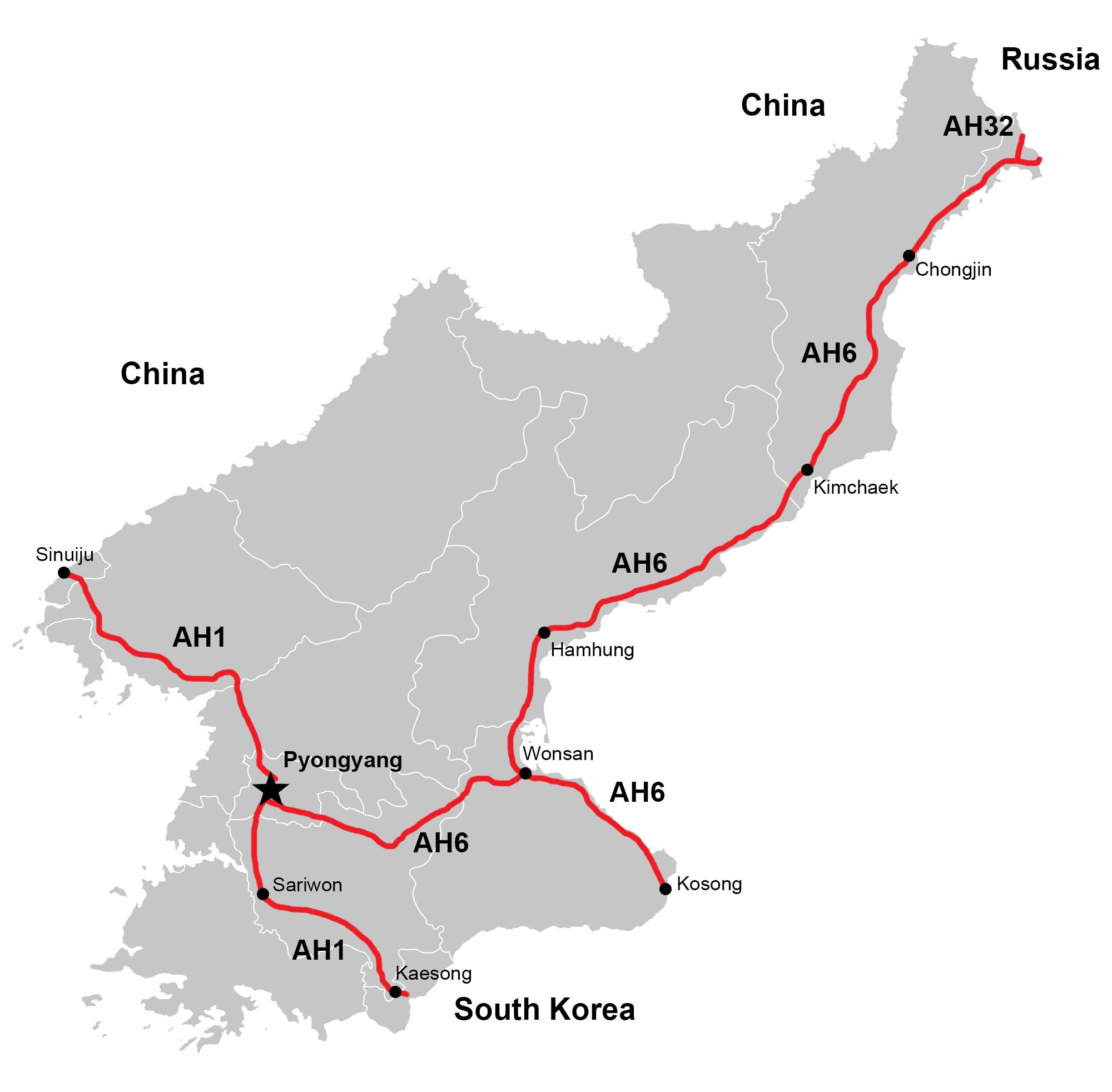
Map of AH1-AH6-AH32 in North Korea

The Asian Highways (AH) are a cooperative road project in Asia led by the United Nations Economic Commission for Asia and the Pacific (UNESCAP), formalised on 18 November 2003.

The sections of motorway from Sinuiju to Kaesong are part of Asian Highway 1 (AH1).

Roads AH1, AH6 and AH32 pass through North Korea, this network covers 1,320 km of the country.

Asian Highway Handbook in North Korea
Road number	Route	Length (km)
AH1	Panmunjom – Pyongyang – Sinuiju	405
AH6	Kosong – Wonsan (– Pyongyang) – Chongjin – Sonbong – Khasan – Border with Russia	855
AH32	Sonbong – Wongjong	60

== Car transport ==
Car transport is restricted by a series of regulations. According to North Korean exile Kim Ji-ho, unless a civilian driver receives a special permit, it is forbidden to drive alone (the driver must carry passengers). Other civilian permits are:

- a military mobilisation permit (for transporting soldiers in wartime).
- a driver training certificate (to be renewed annually)
- a fuel validity document (a certificate confirming that the fuel has been purchased from an authorised source), and
- a mechanical certificate (to prove that the car is roadworthy).

Since 2017, electric bicycles have become popular in Pyongyang; around 5% of bicycles are electric. Locally produced e-bikes and Chinese e-bikes were available.

== Road signs in North Korea ==
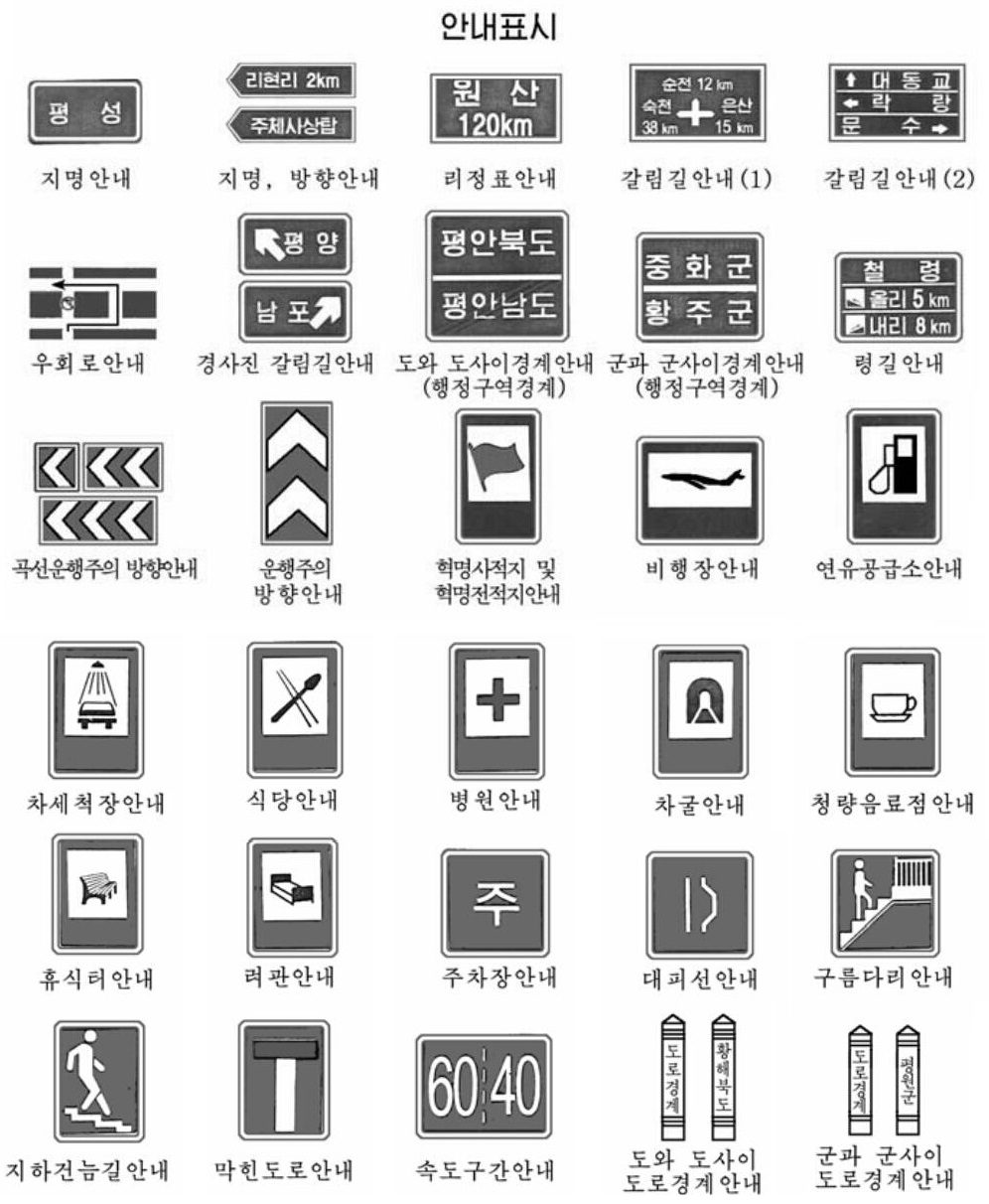
North Korean road signs

Since 1945/1946, traffic has travelled on the right on roads. In towns, the speed of traffic is determined by the lane in which the driver is driving.

The red circle signs with the number inside indicate the speed limits. On motorways, the usual limit is 80 km/h and 100 km/h for the right-hand lanes. The rightmost lane of a motorway is sometimes, as on the Pyongyang-Myohyang motorway, limited to 60 km/h near the junctions of the slip roads.

Outside Pyongyang, roundabouts are often used at busy intersections.

North Korean law prohibits walking or cycling on motorways. Motorway traffic is restricted to authorised vehicles, which include military vehicles, intercity buses, emergency transport vehicles and vehicles carrying residents visiting revolutionary sites or foreign tourists.

== North-South cooperation ==
Cooperation between North and South Korea in the field of road infrastructure is regularly discussed. These often involve road projects linking the two Koreas, such as the road to Kaesong, or the road to the tourist area of Mount Kumgang.

At the June 2000 Inter-Korean Summit, the renovation of roads was mentioned as a subject for improving North-South relations.

In 2013, President Park Geun-hye proposed a land transport corridor, the "Eurasia Initiative", linking China and Russia to South Korea via North Korea, but the project came to nothing because of the sanctions imposed on North Korea.

It was agreed on 28 June 2018 to upgrade two North Korean roads to international standards. There are plans to upgrade the Donghae railway on the east coast and the Gyeongeui railway connecting Seoul to Pyongyang via the city of Kaesong.

== Gallery ==
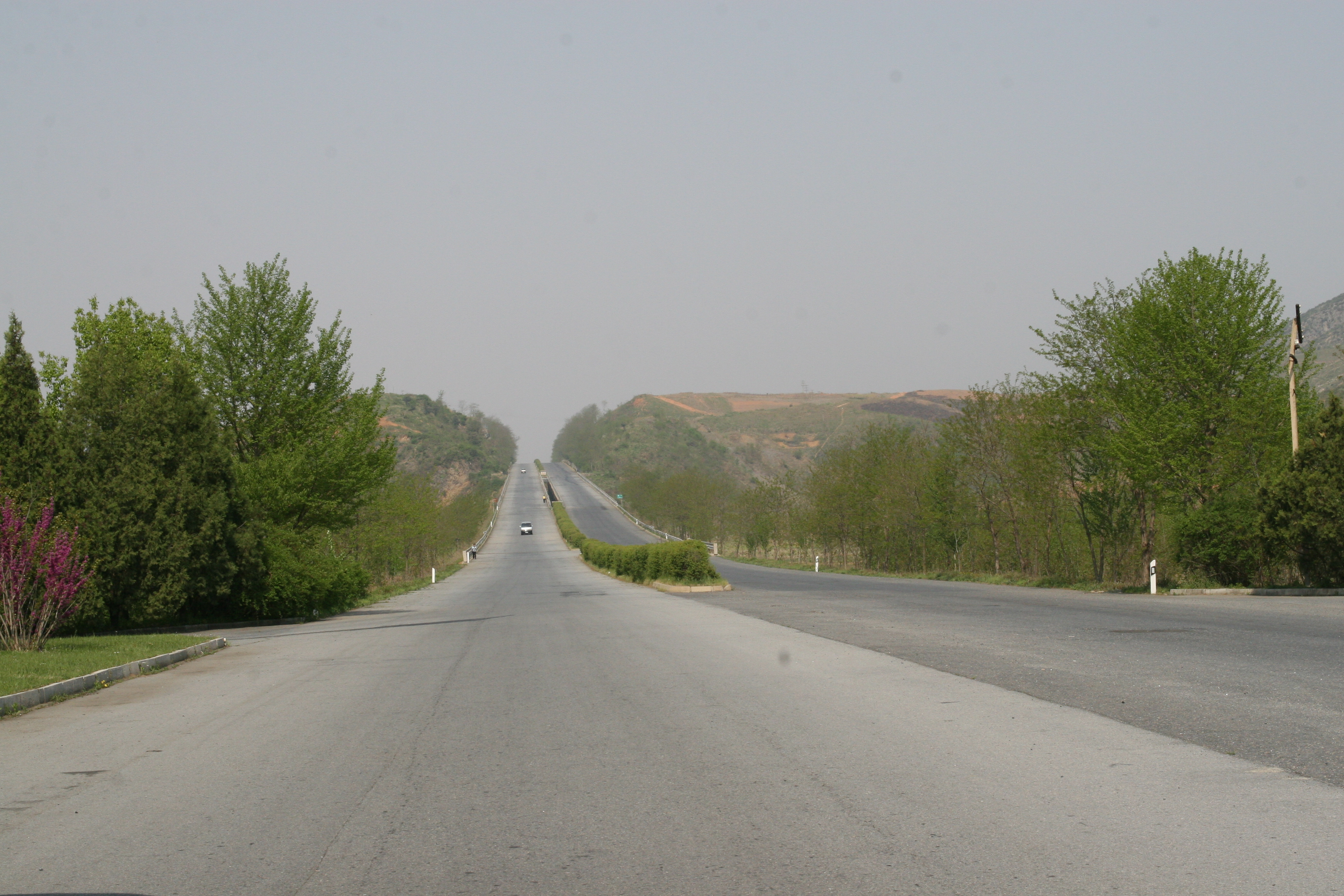
Pyongyang-Kaesong motorway

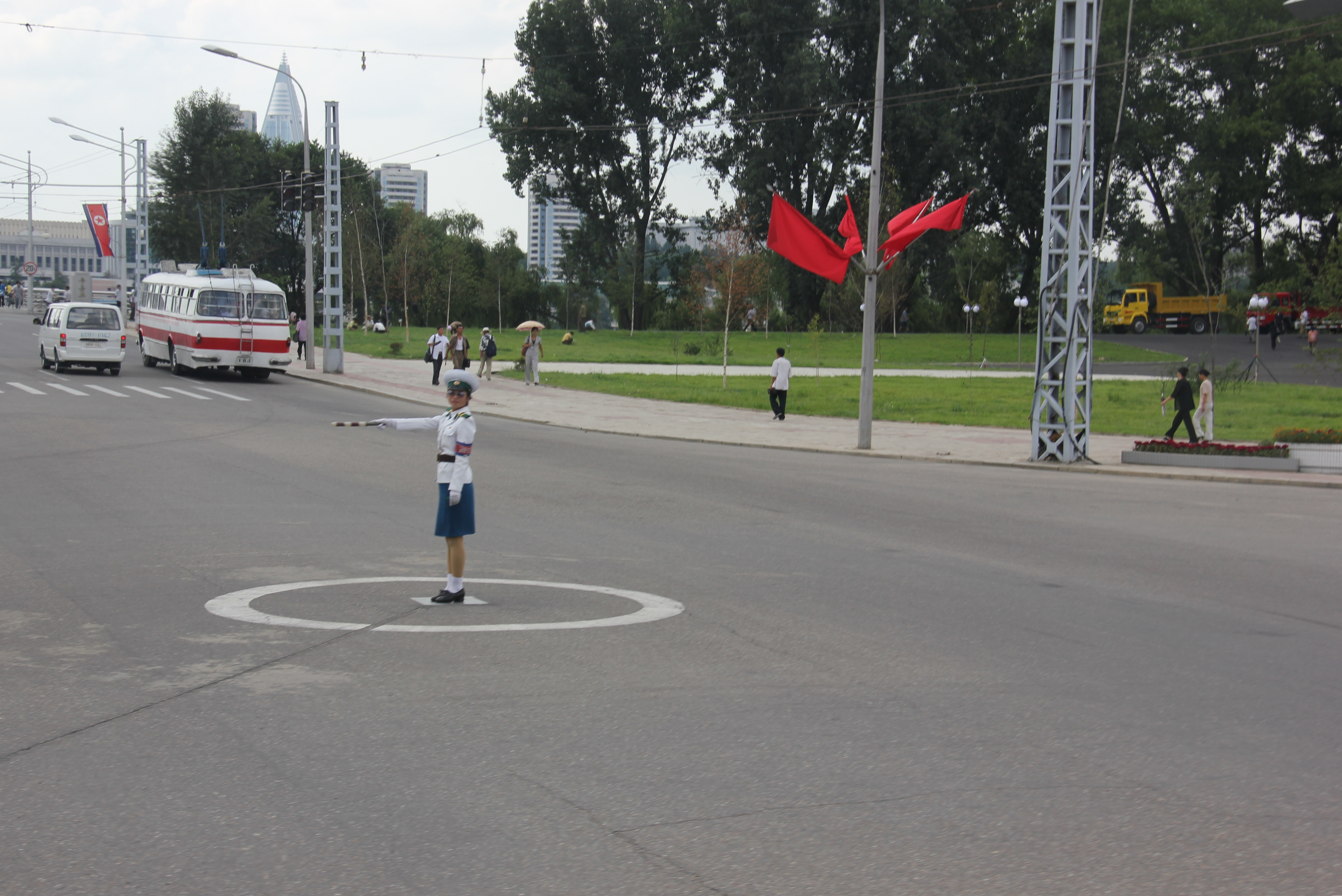
A road junction in Pyongyang

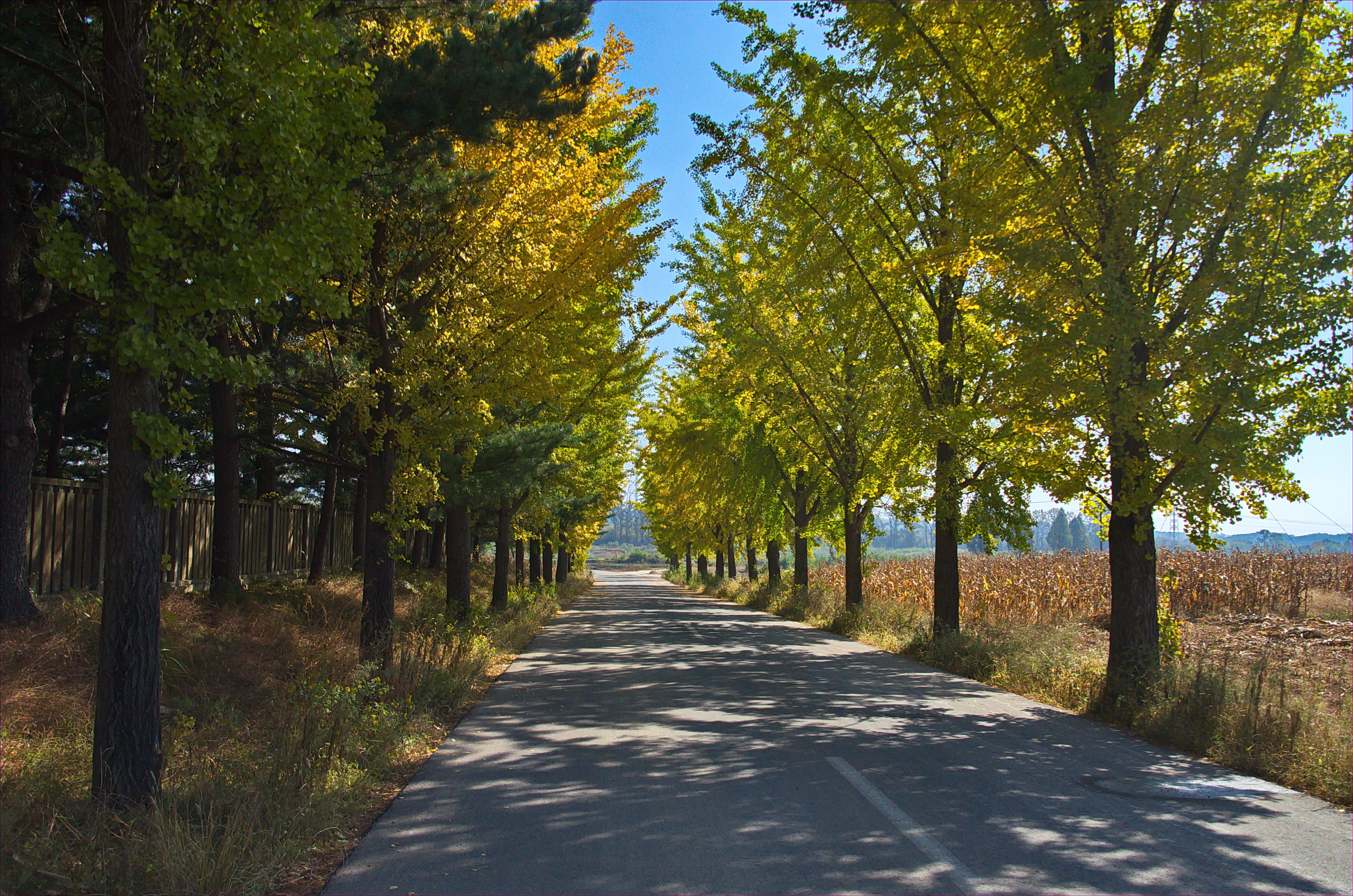
Paved road to Panmunjon, on the border with South Korea

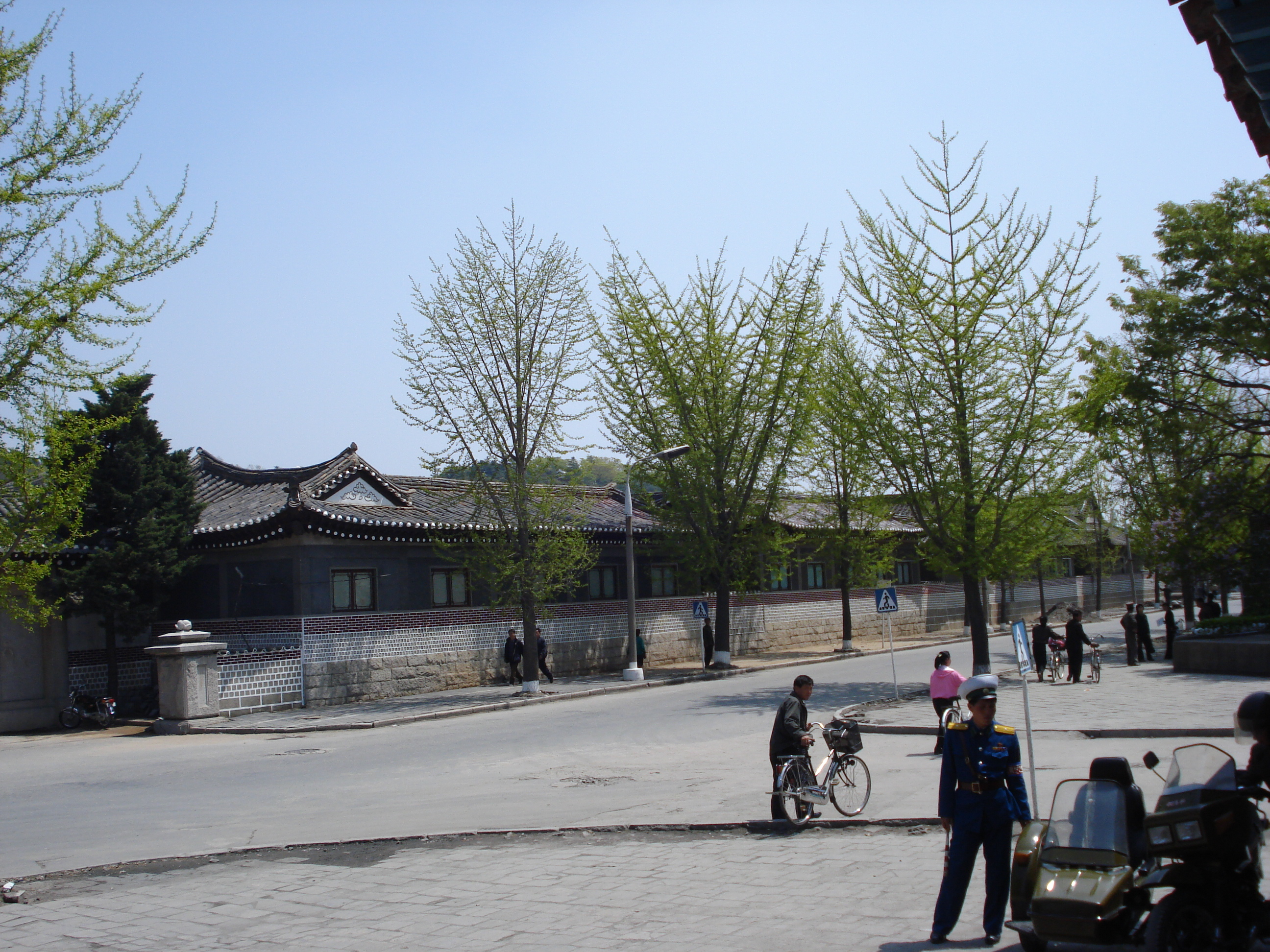
A secondary road in Kaesong

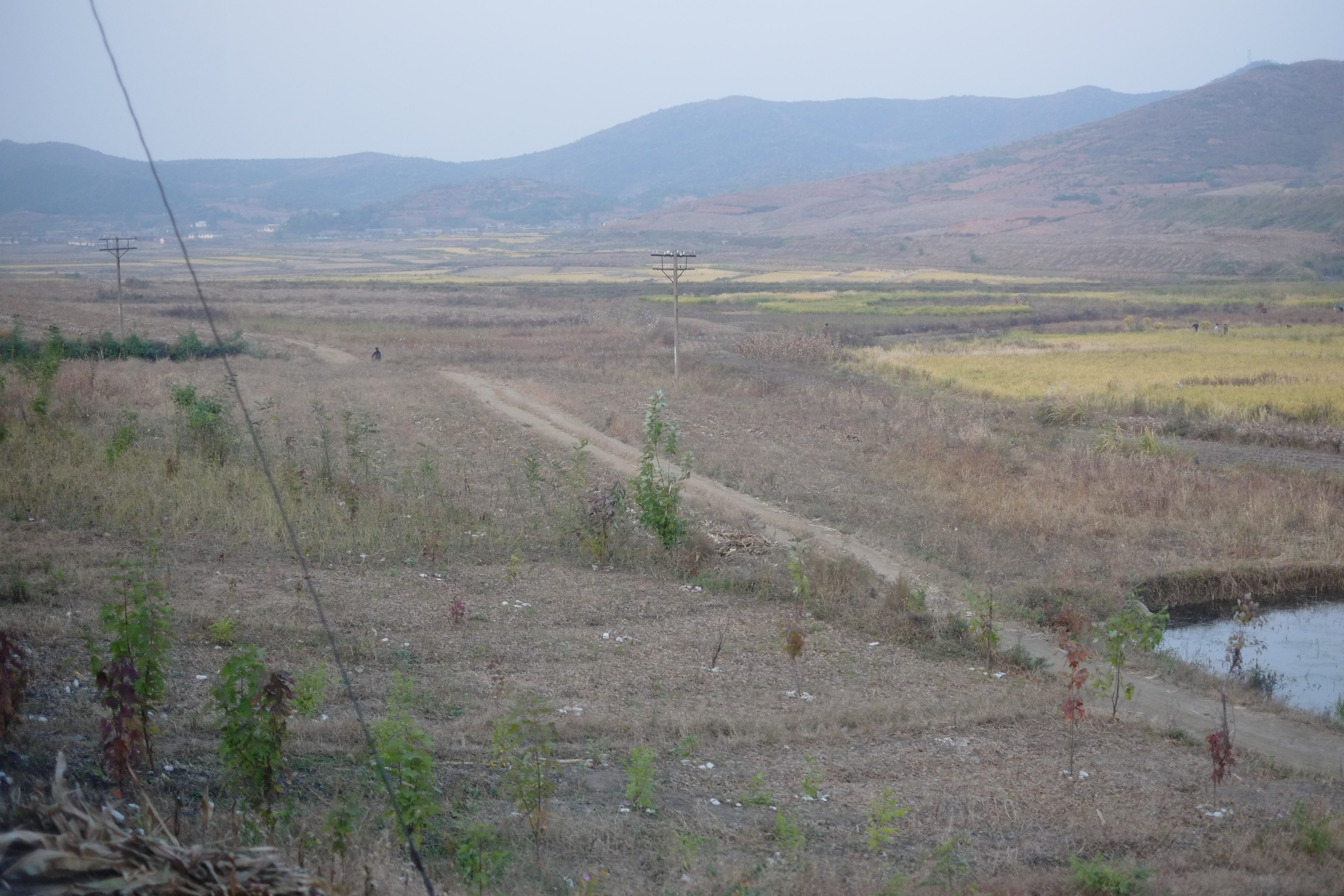
Road through a rural area

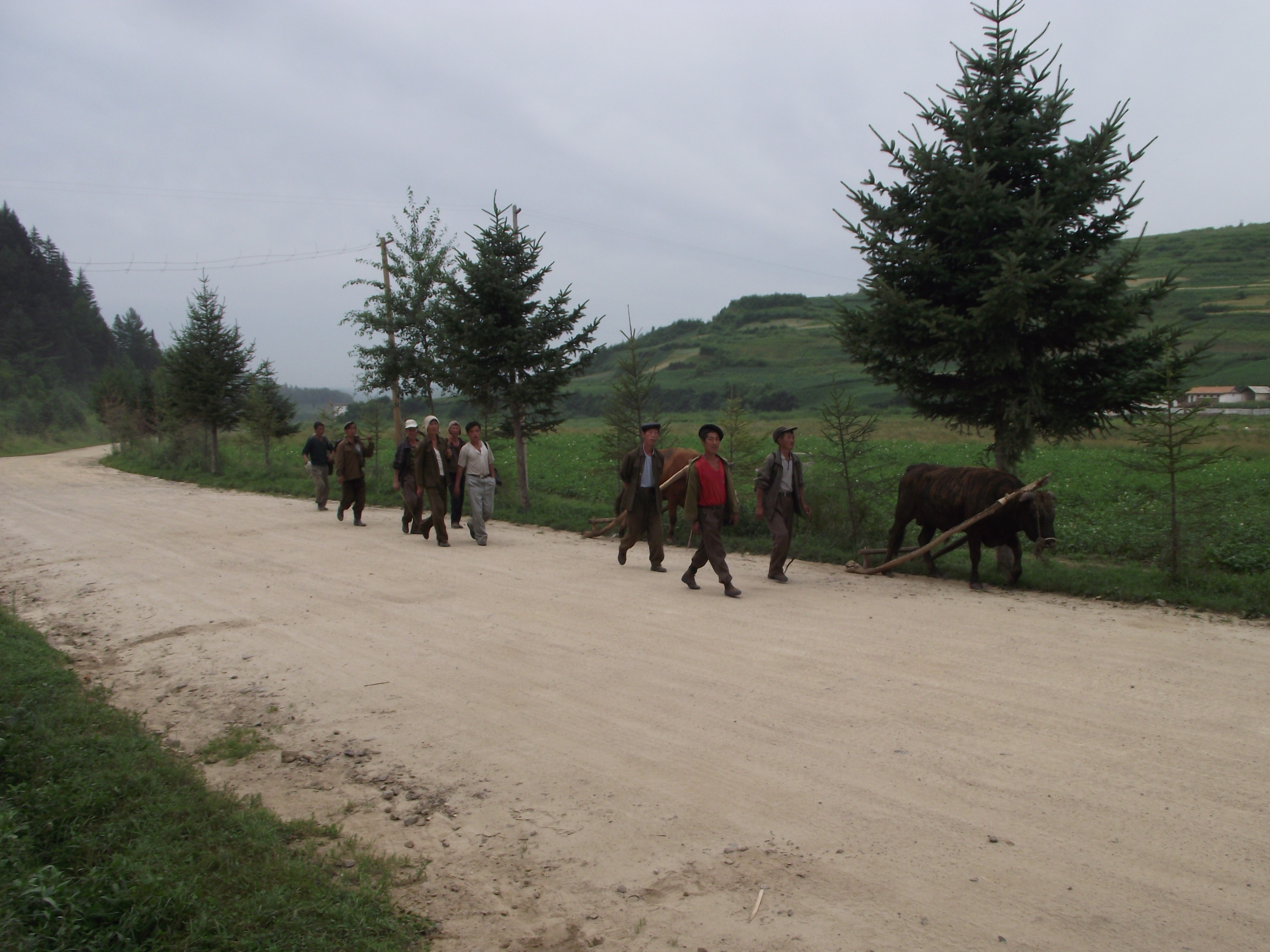
Road with pedestrians

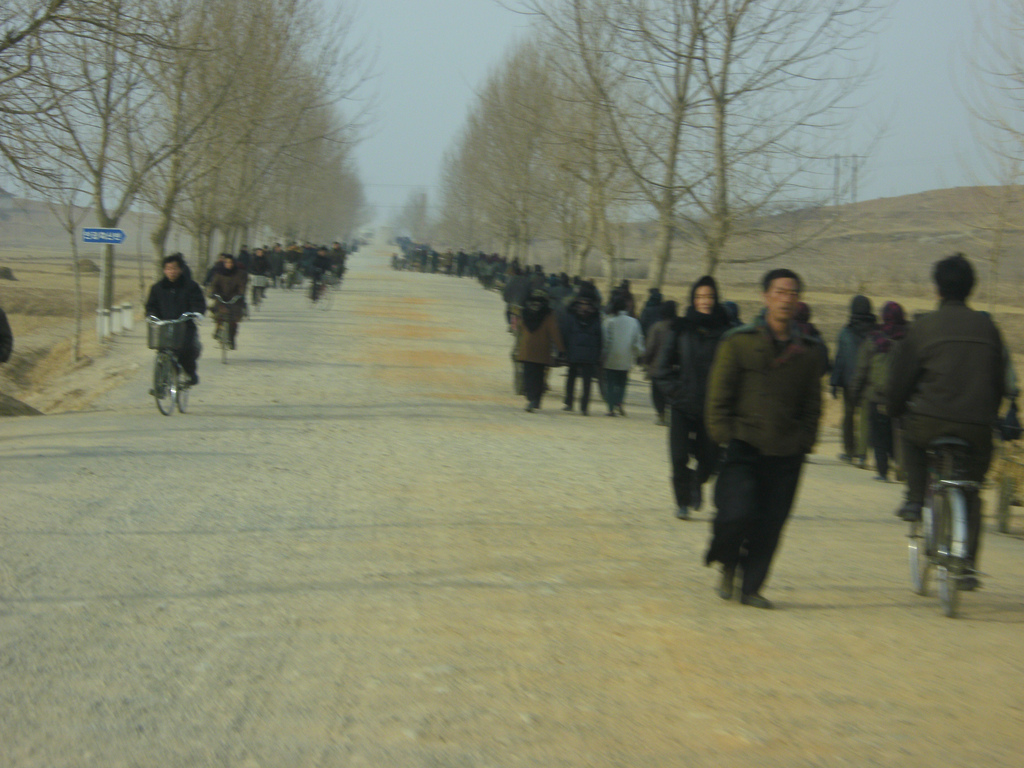
Traffic mainly pedestrians and cyclists on a road

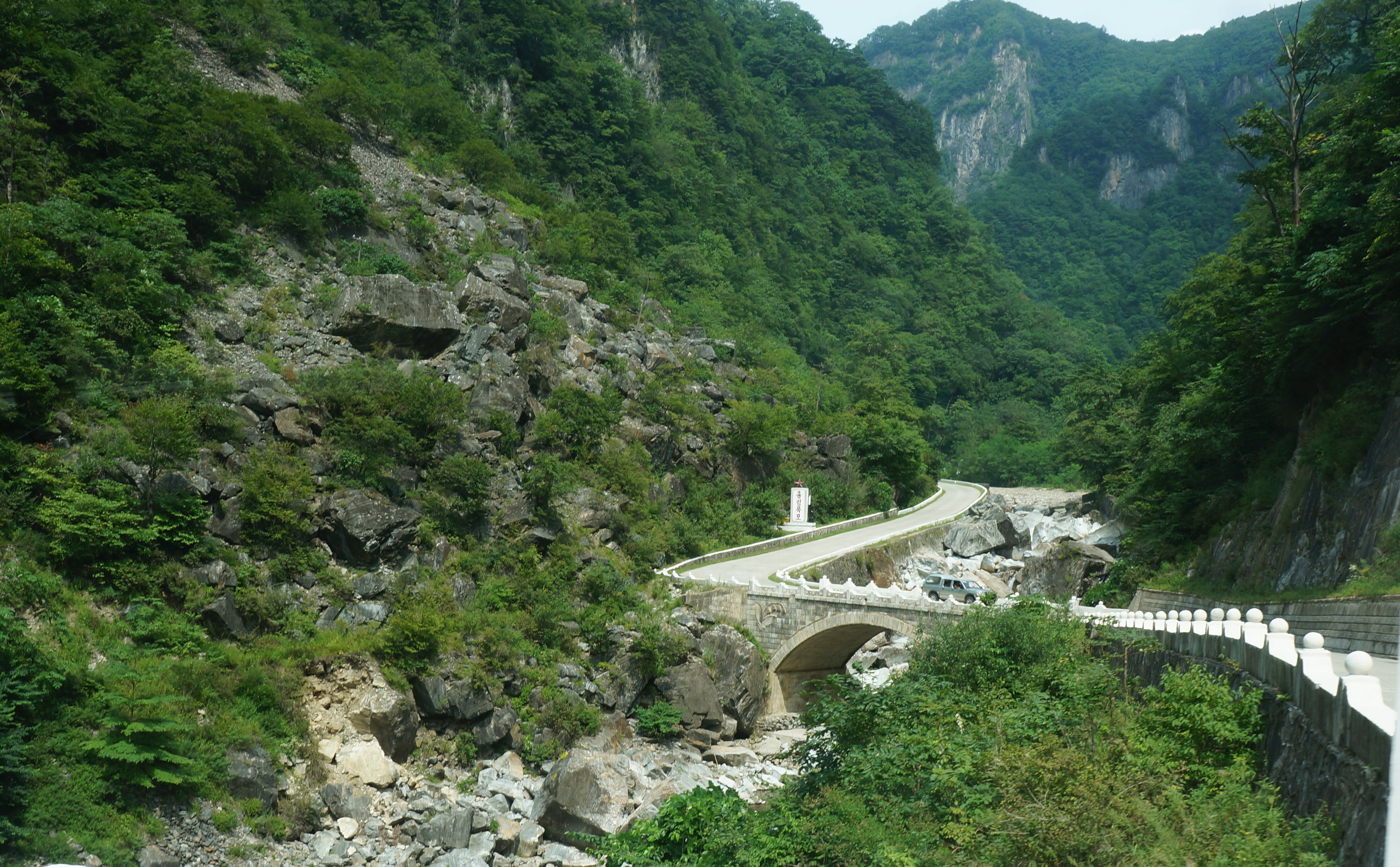
Route to the Ulim waterfalls near Wonsan

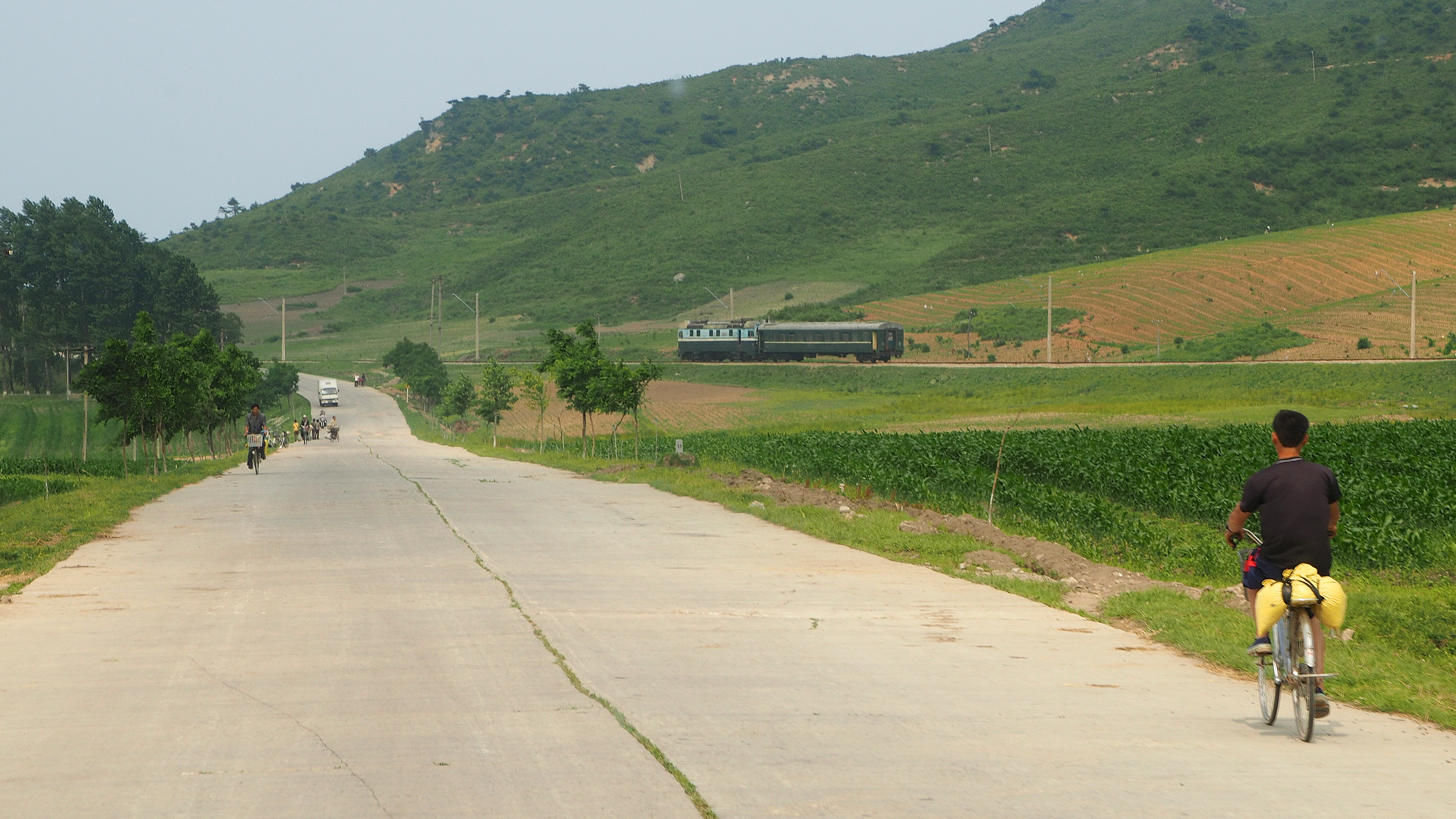
Road from Wonsan to Mount Kumgang, along the railway network

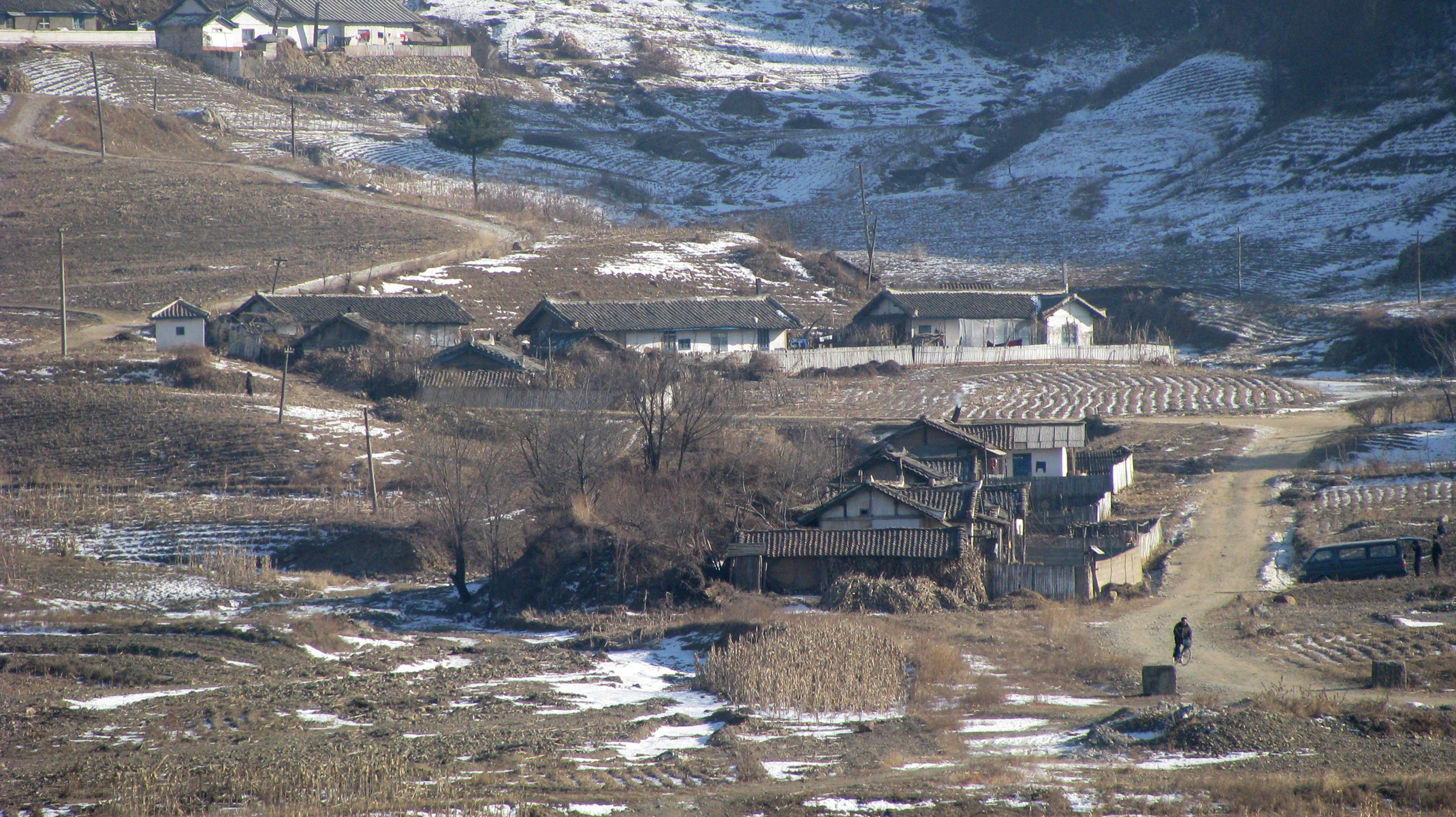
Road through a village

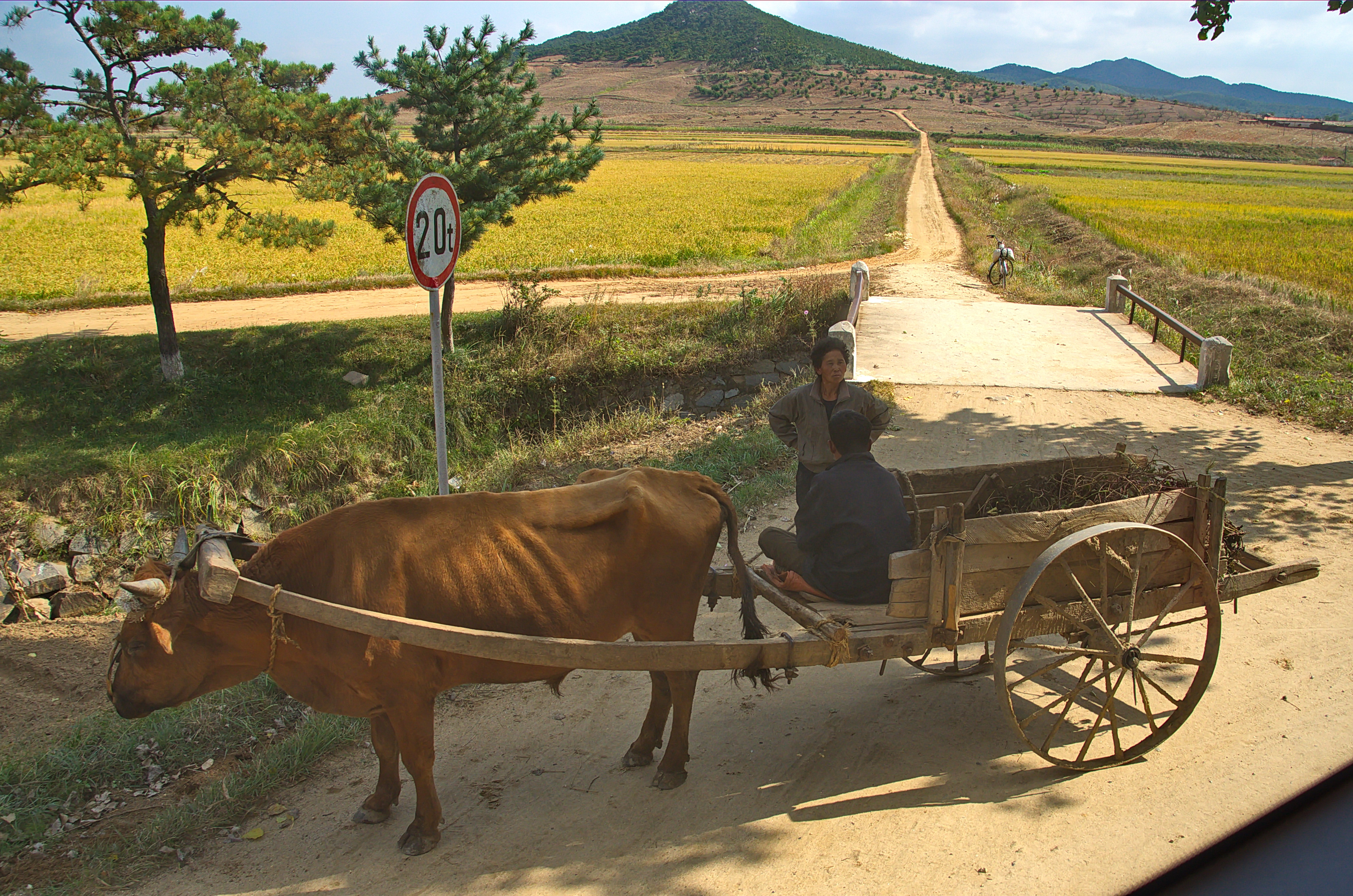
Road

== See also ==
=== Related articles ===
- Transport in North Korea#Roads
