= Expressways in Korea =

Expressways in Korea or Motorways in Korea refer to:

- Expressways in South Korea
- Motorways in North Korea
