= Motorways in North Korea =

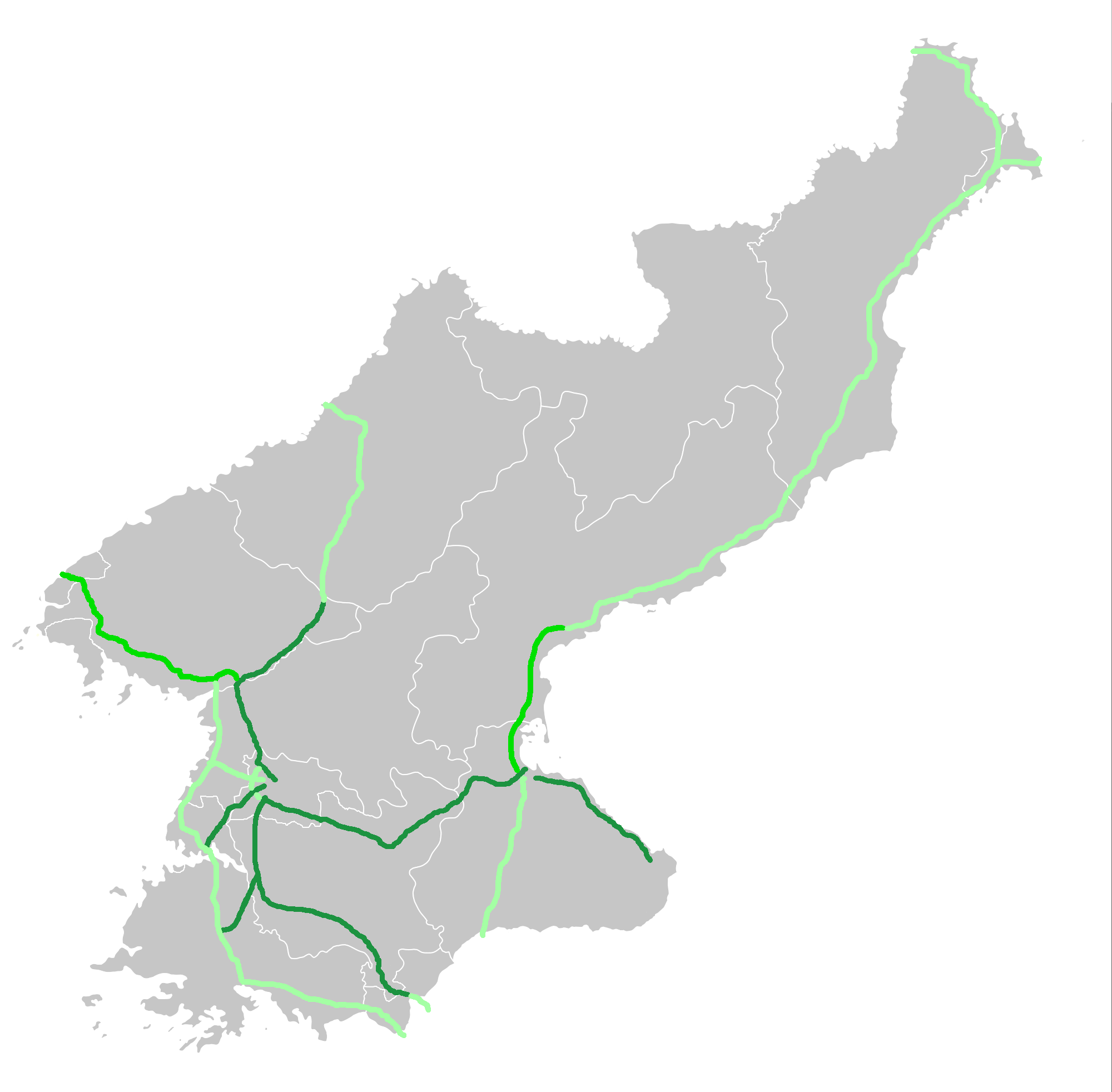
Map of the network

North Korea has eight main motorways.

Name	Korean	Origin	Terminus	Opened
Pyongyang–Wonsan Tourist Motorway	평양원산관광도로	Pyongyang	Wonsan	1978
Pyongyang–Kaesong Motorway	평양개성고속도로	Pyongyang	Kaesong	
Pyongyang–Huichon Motorway	평양희천고속도로	Pyongyang	Huichon	
Youth Hero Motorway	청년영웅도로	Pyongyang	Nampo	2000
Wonsan–Mount Kumgang Motorway	원산금강산고속도로	Wonsan	Kosong	
Sariwon–Sinchon Motorway	사리원신천고속도로	Sariwon	Sinchon	
Pyongyang–Sinuiju Motorway	평양신의주고속도로	Pyongyang	Sinuiju	
Pyongyang–Kangdong Motorway	평양강동고속도로	Pyongyang	Kangdong	

== See also ==
- Roads in North Korea
- Transport in North Korea
