= Pyongyang–Sinuiju Motorway =

Road in North Korea

Pyongyang–Sinŭiju Motorway
- 평양신의주고속도로
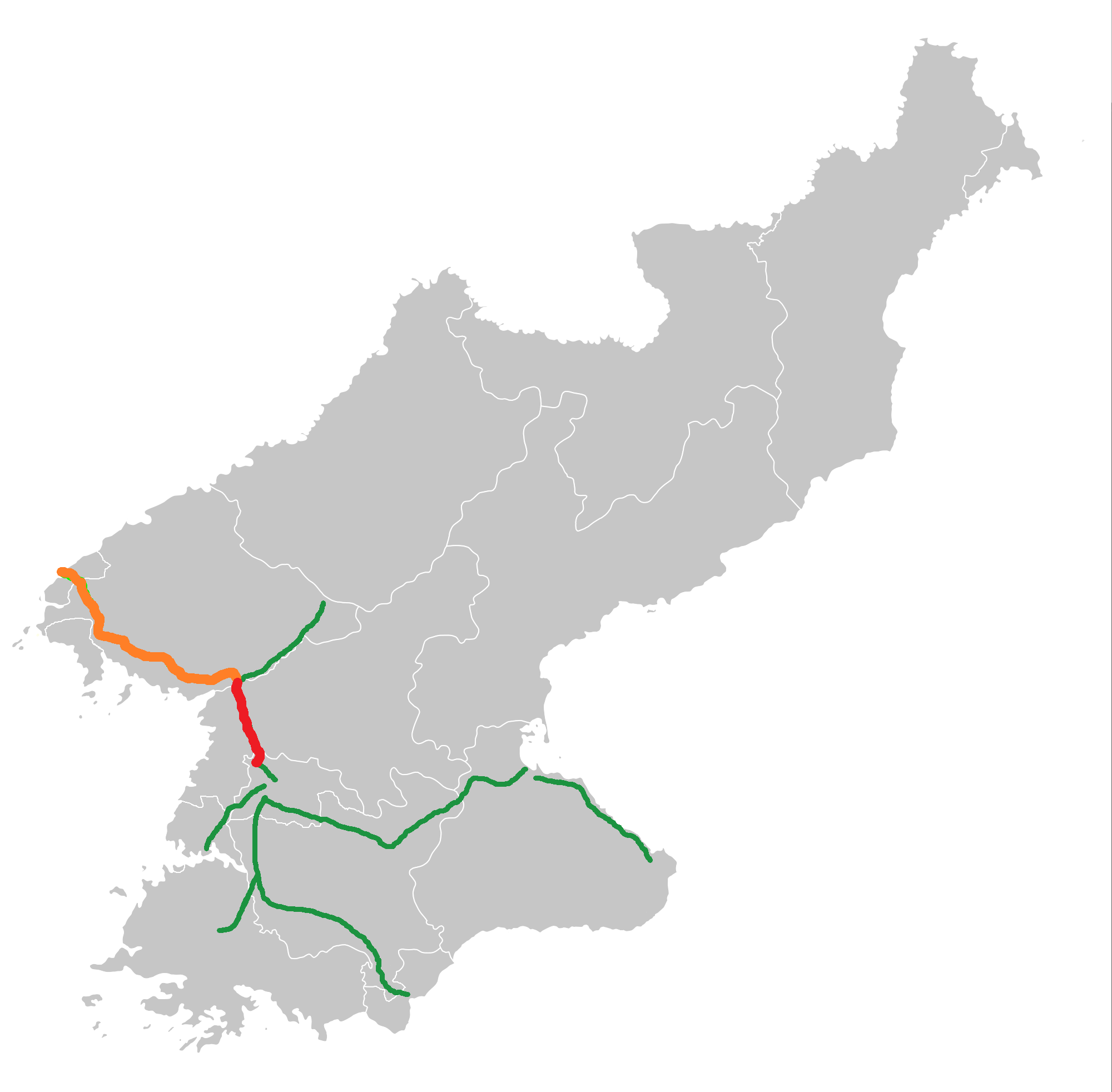

Route information
- Part of AH1
- Length: 387.1 km (240.5 mi)

Location
- Country: North Korea

Highway system
- Transport in North Korea; Motorways

The Pyongyang–Sinŭiju Motorway (Korean: 평양신의주고속도로) is a motorway in North Korea under construction, which will be built parallel to the Pyongyang–Sinŭiju line and will connect Pyongyang with Sinŭiju. The Chinese border city Dandong is to be reached via Sino-Korean Friendship Bridge. The Pyongyang–Sinŭiju Expressway is said to be 387.1 kilometers long.

== Construction ==
Construction started in 2010. It is not known when the route will be completed. The lanes for the two directions of travel should not be separated in the middle by green strips or guardrails. At the same time, the Sinŭiju–Kaesŏng high-speed railway is to be built, designed for a maximum speed of 200 km/h. When completed, it closes a gap in Asian Highway 1.

== Buildings ==
A total of 19 toll booths, 12 rest stops and 77 bridges will be built.
