= Pyongyang–Kaesong Motorway =

Highway in North Korea

Coordinates: 38.4349°N 126.1387°E

Pyongyang–Kaesong Motorway
- 평양개성고속도로
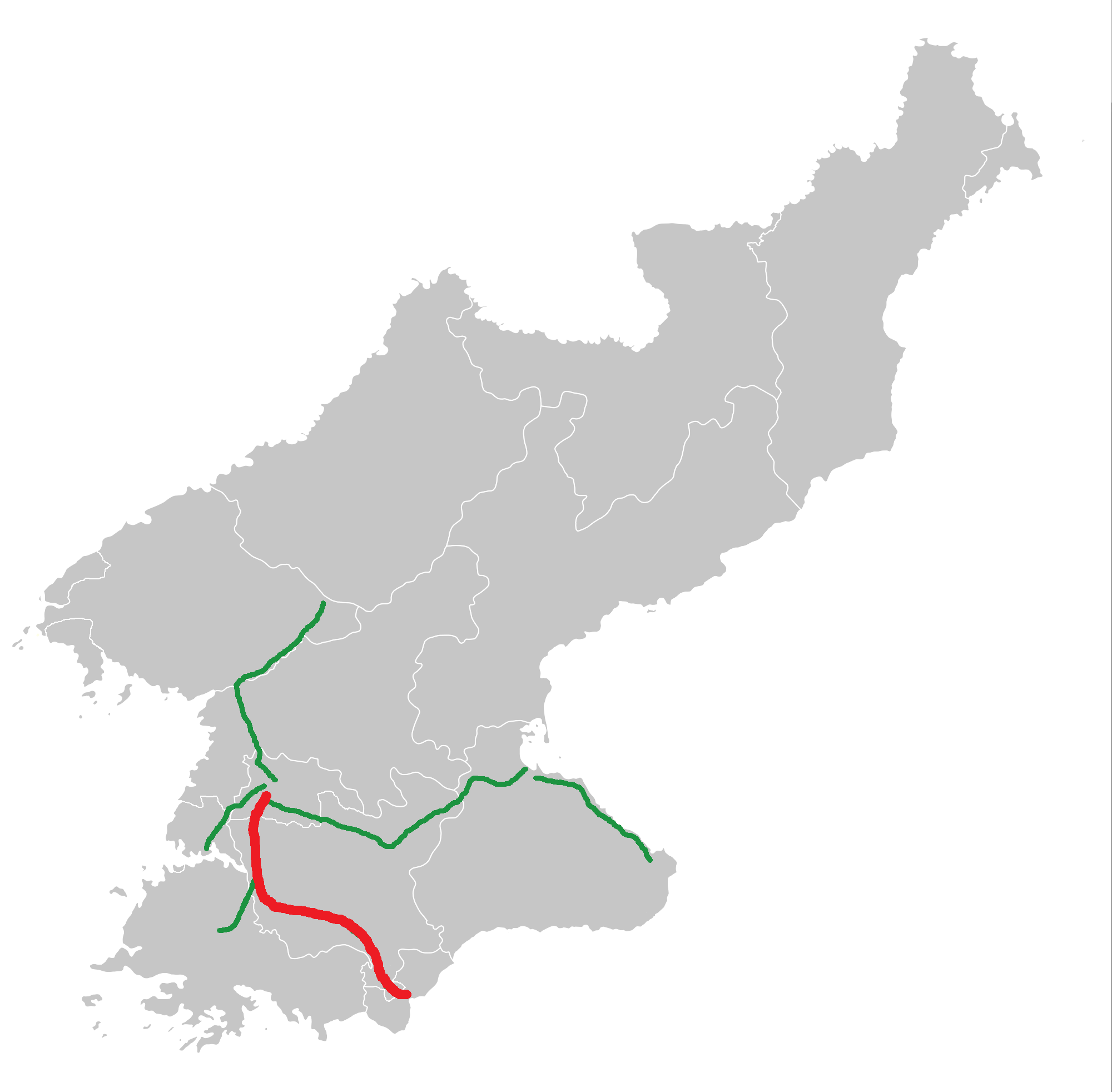

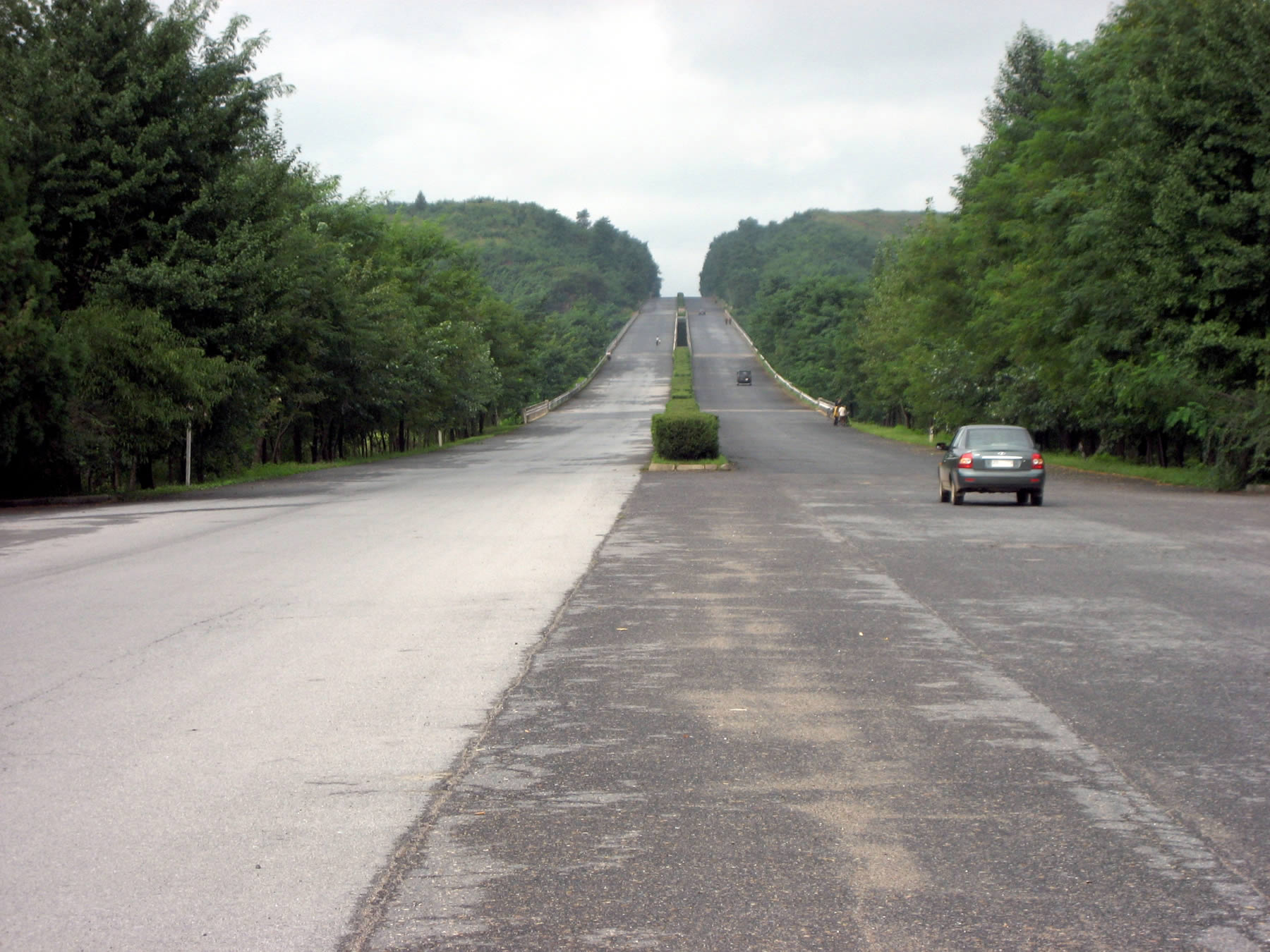

Route information
- Part of AH1
- Length: 170 km (110 mi)

Major junctions
- North end: Tongil Street / Chungsong Bridge, Rangnang-guyok, Pyongyang
- Pyongyang–Wonsan Tourist Motorway, Kangnam-gun, North Hwanghae; Sariwon–Sincheon Motorway, Hwangju-gun, North Hwanghae
- South end: Entrance to Joint Security Area and the Korean Demilitarized Zone, Kaesong Industrial Region, North Hwanghae

Location
- Country: North Korea

Highway system
- Transport in North Korea; Motorways

The Pyongyang-Kaesong Motorway (Korean: 평양개성고속도로; Hancha: 平壤–開城高速道路), is a controlled-access highway in North Korea. It connects the capital Pyongyang to the Joint Security Area at the Korean Demilitarized Zone via Sariwon and Kaesong. The distance to Seoul in South Korea is present on signs on the highway, although it is not possible to cross the border to South Korea.

It is 170 km (110 mi) long, with multiple paved lanes and several tunnels. Tourists have reported that there is very light traffic, as well as multiple checkpoints and tank traps.

The project was economically ill-advised because North Korea had hitherto consistently focused on developing railway links for transport, diminishing the need for new expressways. Construction finished on April 15, 1992, the birthday of North Korea president Kim Il Sung. The entire highway is part of Asian Highway 1.
