= Youth Hero Motorway =

Expressway in North Korea

Youth Hero Motorway
- 청년영웅도로
- Pyongyang–Nampo Motorway
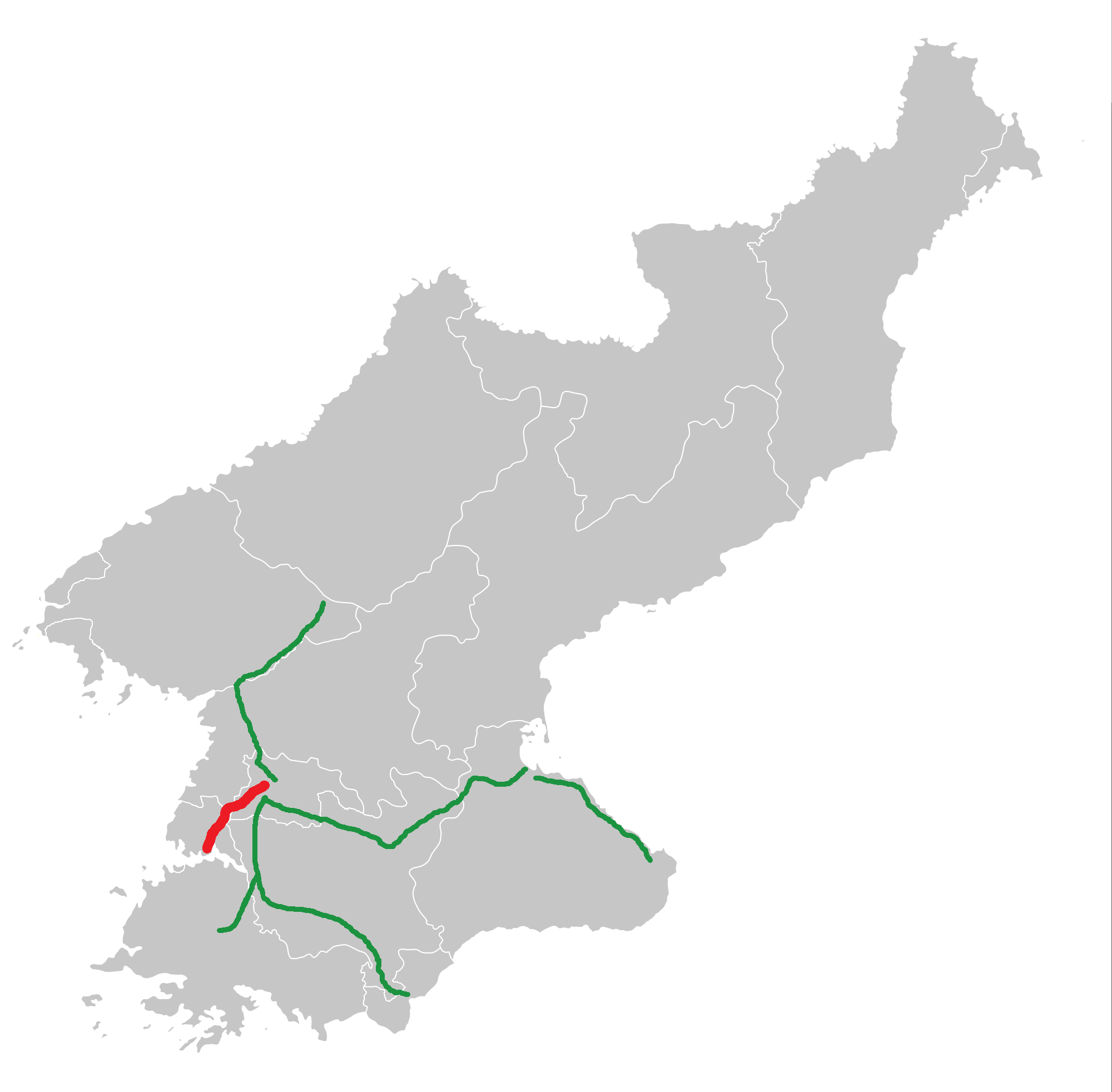

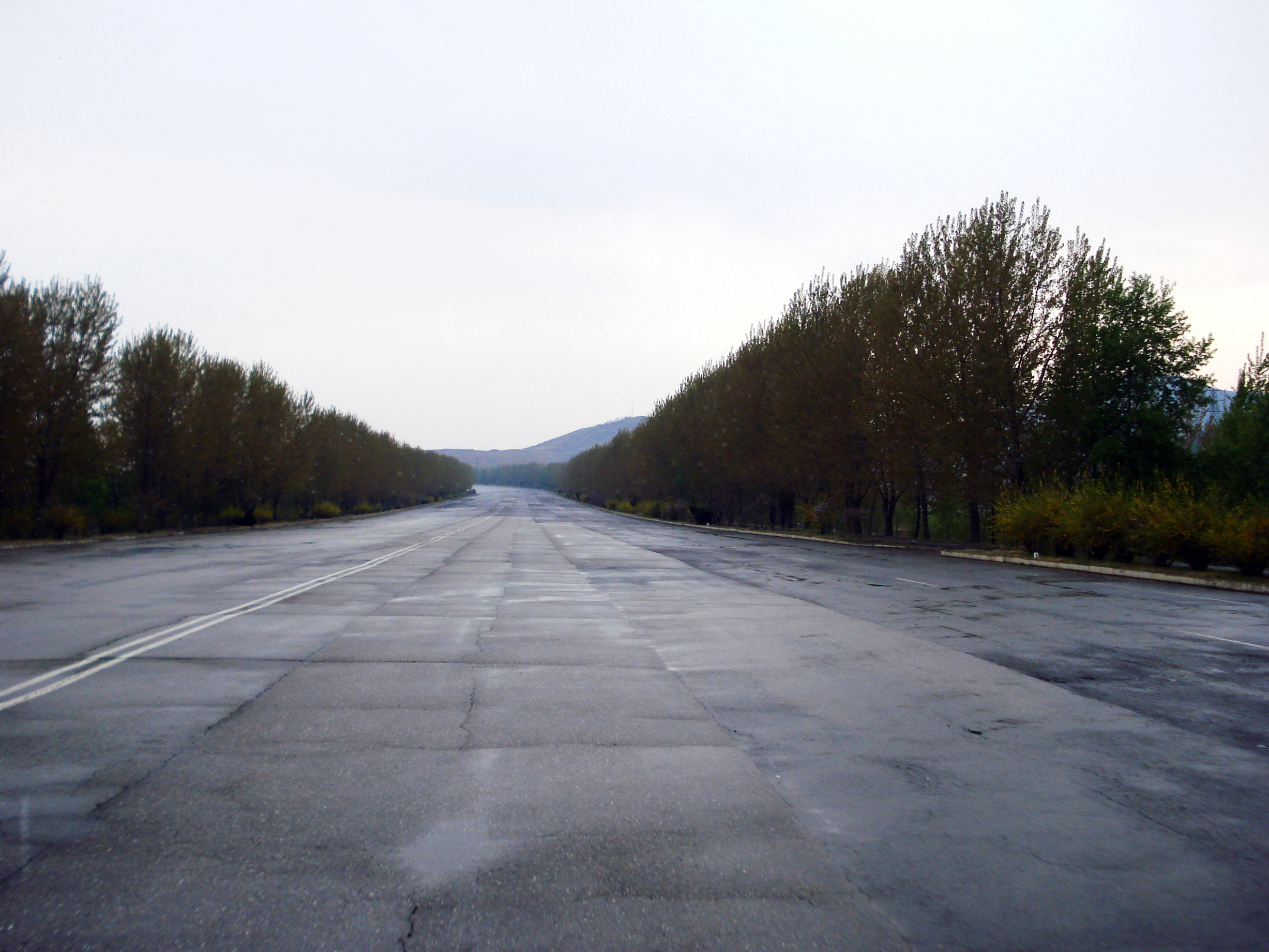

Route information
- Length: 46.3 km (28.8 mi)
- Existed: October 2000–present

Major junctions
- North end: Kwangbok Street, Mangyongdae-guyok, Pyongyang
- South end: Youth Bridge, Hanggu-guyok, Nampo, South Pyongan Province

Location
- Country: North Korea

Highway system
- Transport in North Korea; Motorways

The Youth Hero Motorway (Korean: 청년영웅도로; Hanja: 青年英雄道路), also known as the Pyongyang–Nampo Motorway, is a 46.3-kilometre-long (28 3/4 mi) expressway in North Korea that connects the cities of Pyongyang, the capital of the country, and Nampo, a city on the coast of Korea Bay in South Pyongan Province. Construction began in November 1998, and the expressway opened in October 2000. It is classified as a level 1 roadway.

The motorway is one of many Stakhanovite "speed battle" projects commissioned by the Workers' Party and carried out rapidly by youth brigades under difficult working conditions. The project involved carrying 14 million cubic metres of earth and included over 80 irrigation structures, 50 bridges, and over 3 million cubic metres of asphalt. Supreme Leader Kim Jong-il inspected the motorway and complimented the youth brigades on November 13 following its opening.

In the event of an armed conflict, the highway serves a defense purpose, allowing tank divisions of the Korean People's Army to block access to Pyongyang.
