= Pyongyang–Wonsan Tourist Motorway =

Highway in North Korea

Pyongyang–Wonsan Tourist Motorway
- 평양원산관광도로
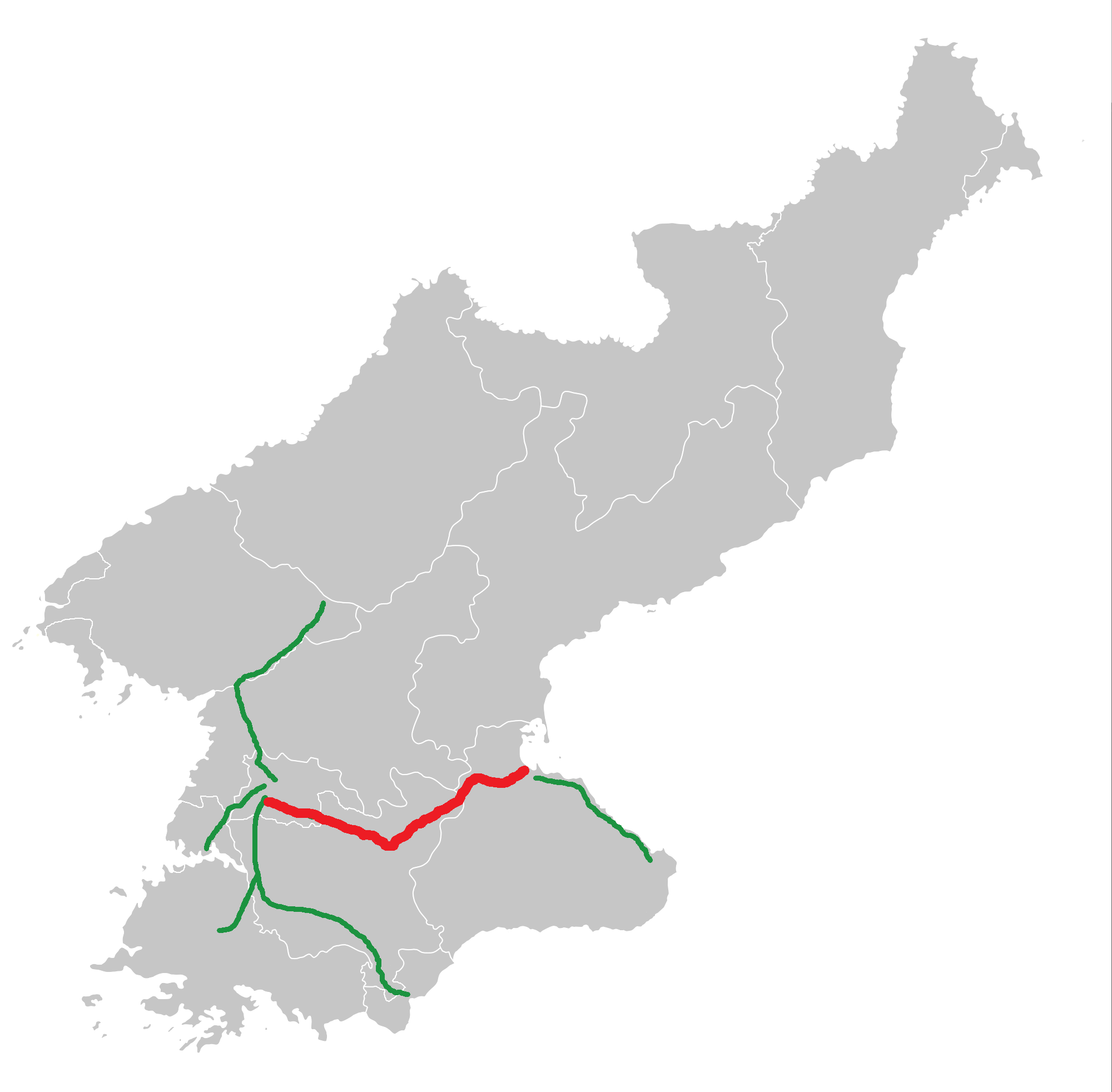

Route information
- Part of AH6
- Length: 172 km (107 mi)
- Existed: 1978–present

Major junctions
- West end: Reunification Highway, Kangnam-gun, North Hwanghae
- East end: Wonsan, Kangwon

Location
- Country: North Korea

Highway system
- Transport in North Korea; Motorways

The Pyongyang–Wonsan Tourist Motorway (Korean: 평양원산관광도로) is a 172-kilometre-long highway (107 mi) in North Korea that connects the cities of Pyongyang, the capital of the country, and Wonsan, a city on the coast of the Sea of Japan in the province of Kangwon. The expressway opened in 1978. The highway became North Korea's first toll road in 2018.

== Images ==
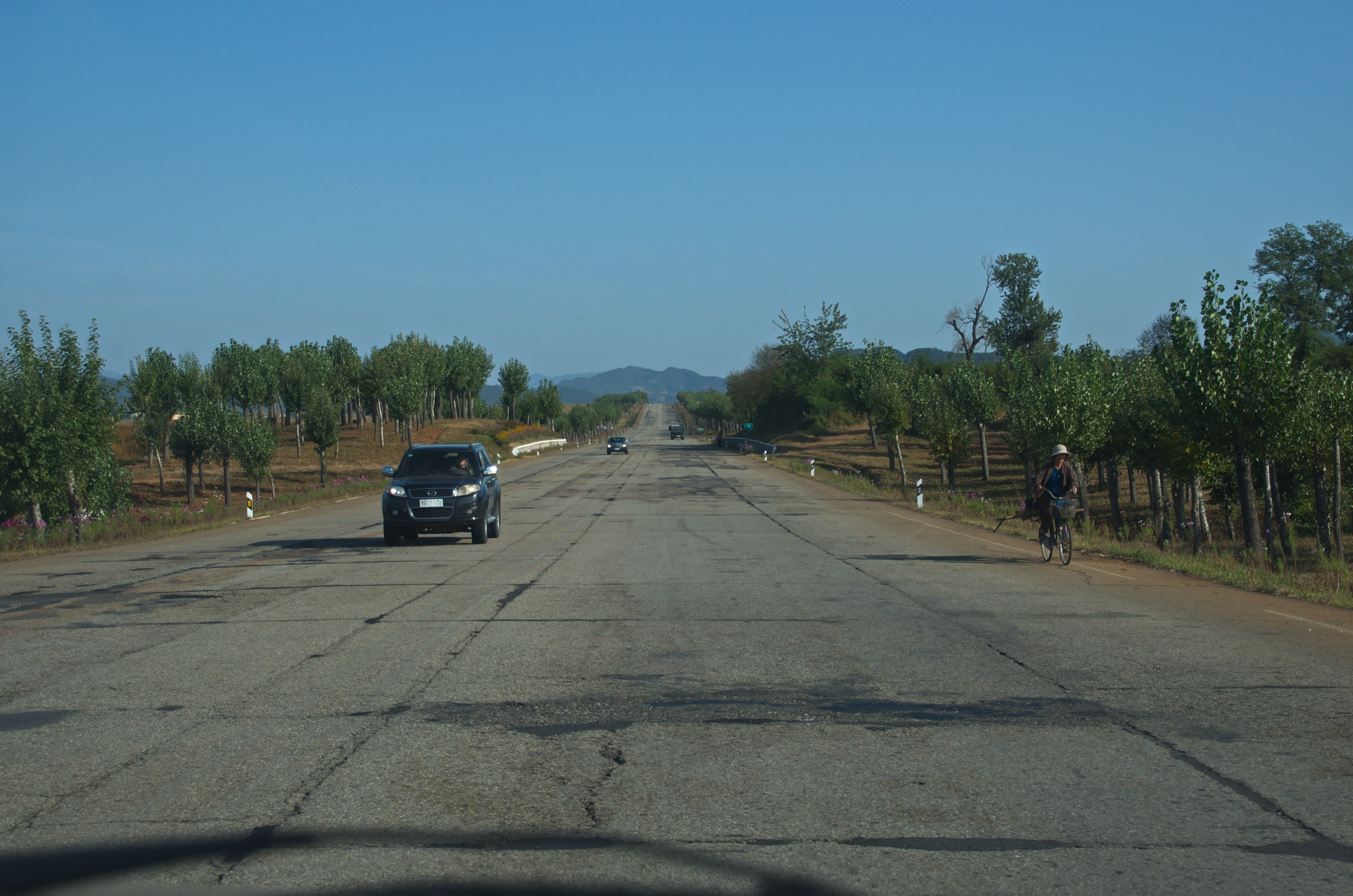

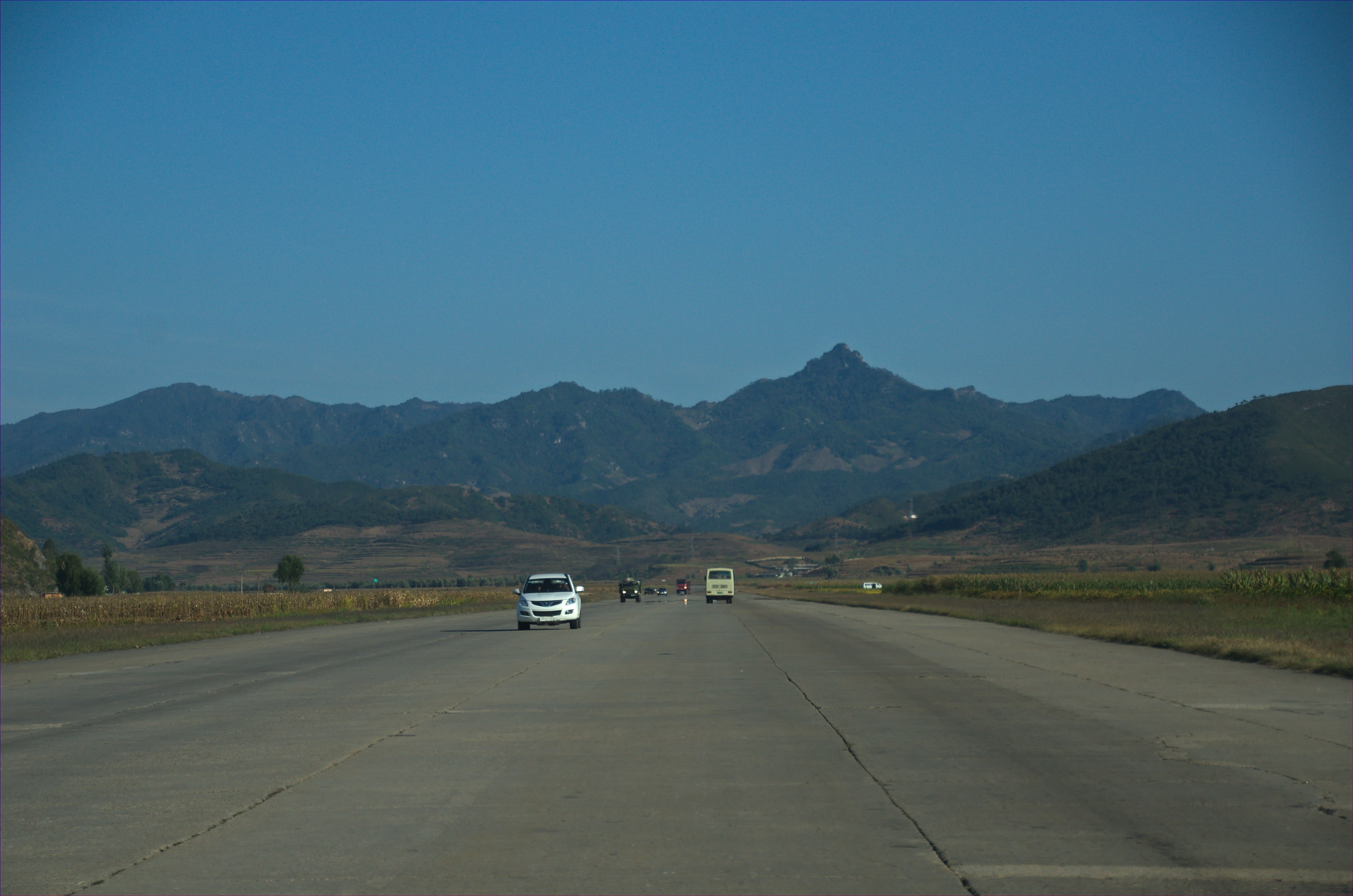

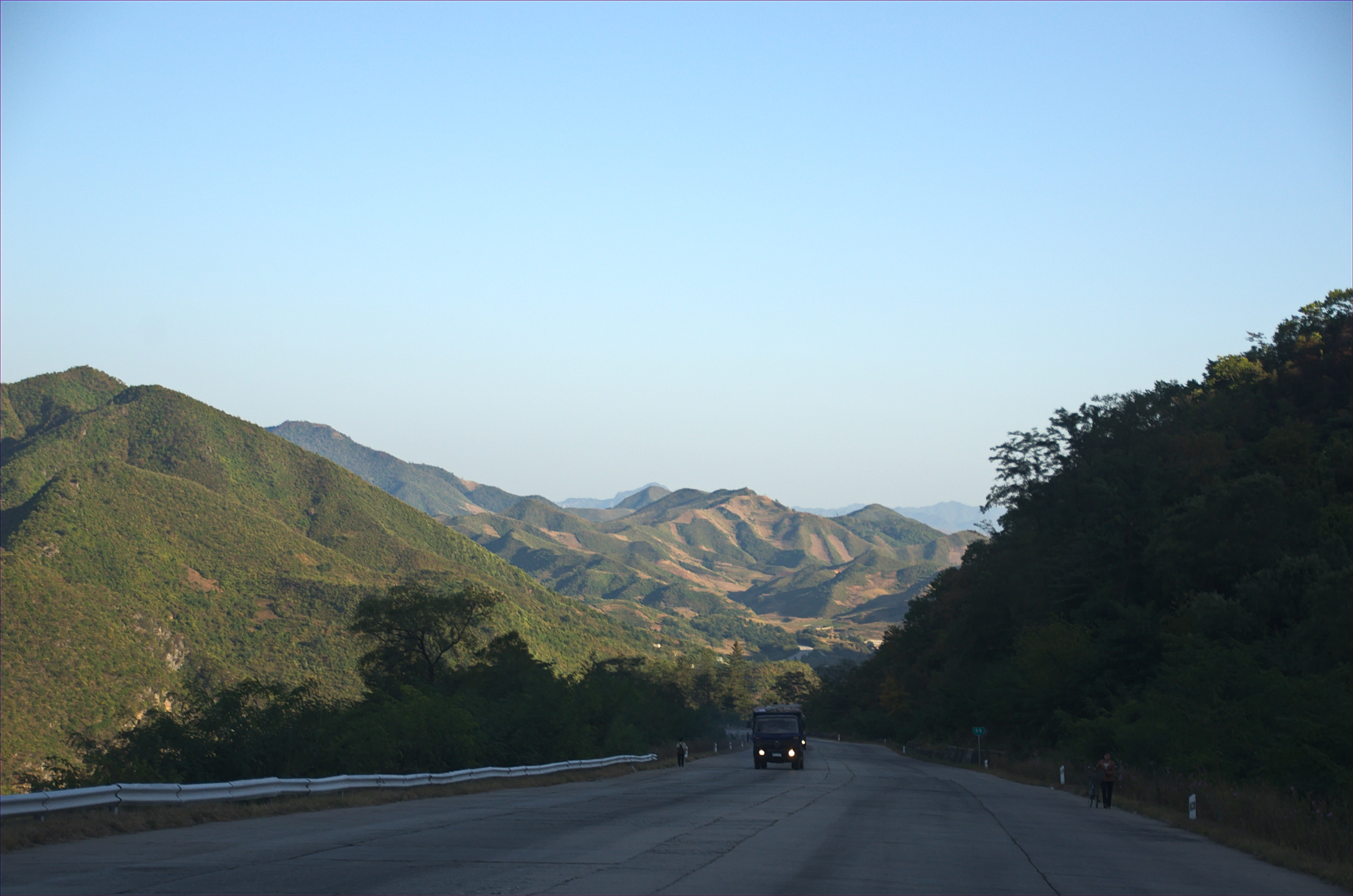

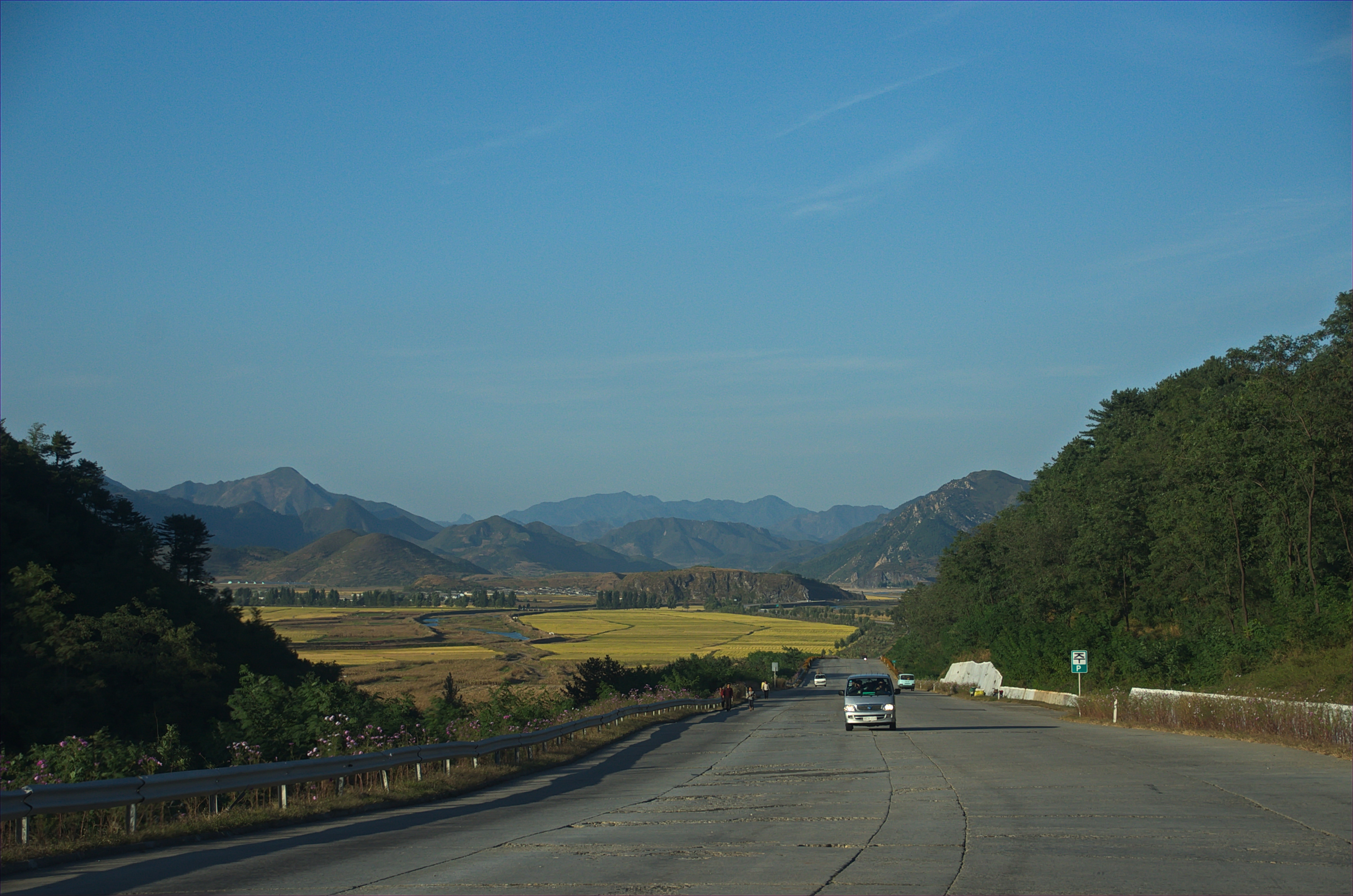

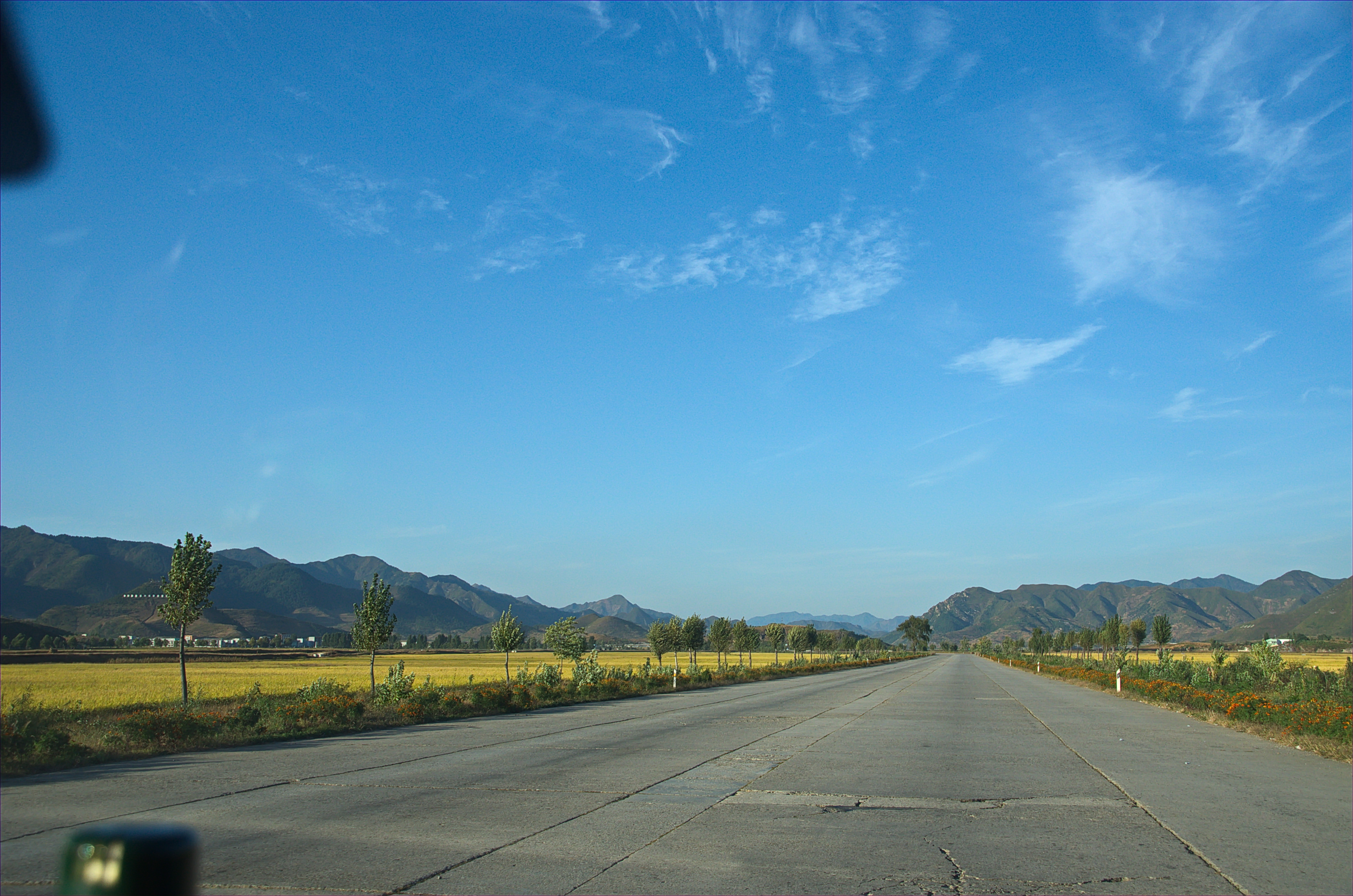
