= Pyeonghwa Motors =

North Korean car manufacturer

- Native name: 평화자동차
- Romanized name: Pyeonghwa Jadongcha
- Type: State-owned
- Industry: Automotive
- Founded: 1998; 28 years ago
- Headquarters: Pyongyang, North Korea
- Area served: North Korea, Vietnam
- Key people: Park Sang-Kwon (CEO and Chairman)
- Products: Cars

Pyeonghwa Motors (PMC; Korean: 평화자동차; Hancha: 平和自動車; RR: Pyeonghwa Jadongcha; MR: P'yŏnghwa Chatongch'a; lit. 'peace'), also spelled Pyonghwa, is one of the two car manufacturers and dealers in the North Korean automotive industry, alongside Sungri Motor Plant. Until 2013, it was a joint venture in Nampo between Pyonghwa Motors of Seoul (South Korea), a company owned by Sun Myung Moon's Unification Church, and the North Korean Ryonbong General Corp. The joint venture produced small cars under licence from Fiat and Brilliance China Auto, a pickup truck and an SUV using complete knock down kits from Chinese manufacturer Dandong Shuguang, and a luxury car of SsangYong design. From 2013, the company has been fully owned by the North Korean state.

Erik van Ingen Schenau, author of the book Automobiles Made in North Korea, has estimated the company's total production in 2005 at not more than around 400 units.

== History ==
Pyeonghwa Motors was officially founded by the Unification Church. The venture came during the period of the Sunshine Policy between North and South Korea, when sanctions on the country were not as tough. The venture was announced in 2000.

In 2002, around $55 million was set aside to build the factory, with which the first production line in Nampo was completed and the first Hwiparam was produced. The Premio and Pronto were later introduced in 2004.

In 2009, PM earned about $700,000 from the sale of 650 cars, with $500,000 remitted to South Korea. Park Sang-Kwon, Pyeonghwa Motors president, started talks to end investment in 2012.

The Unification Church officially transferred all investment to Pyongyang in 2013.

== Production ==
Pyeonghwa holds the exclusive rights to car production, as well as the purchase and sale of used cars in North Korea. However, most North Koreans are unable to afford a car. Due to the very small market for cars in the country, Pyeonghwa's output is reportedly quite low; in 2003, only 314 cars were produced, despite the factory's capacity to produce up to 10,000 cars per year.

== Model list ==
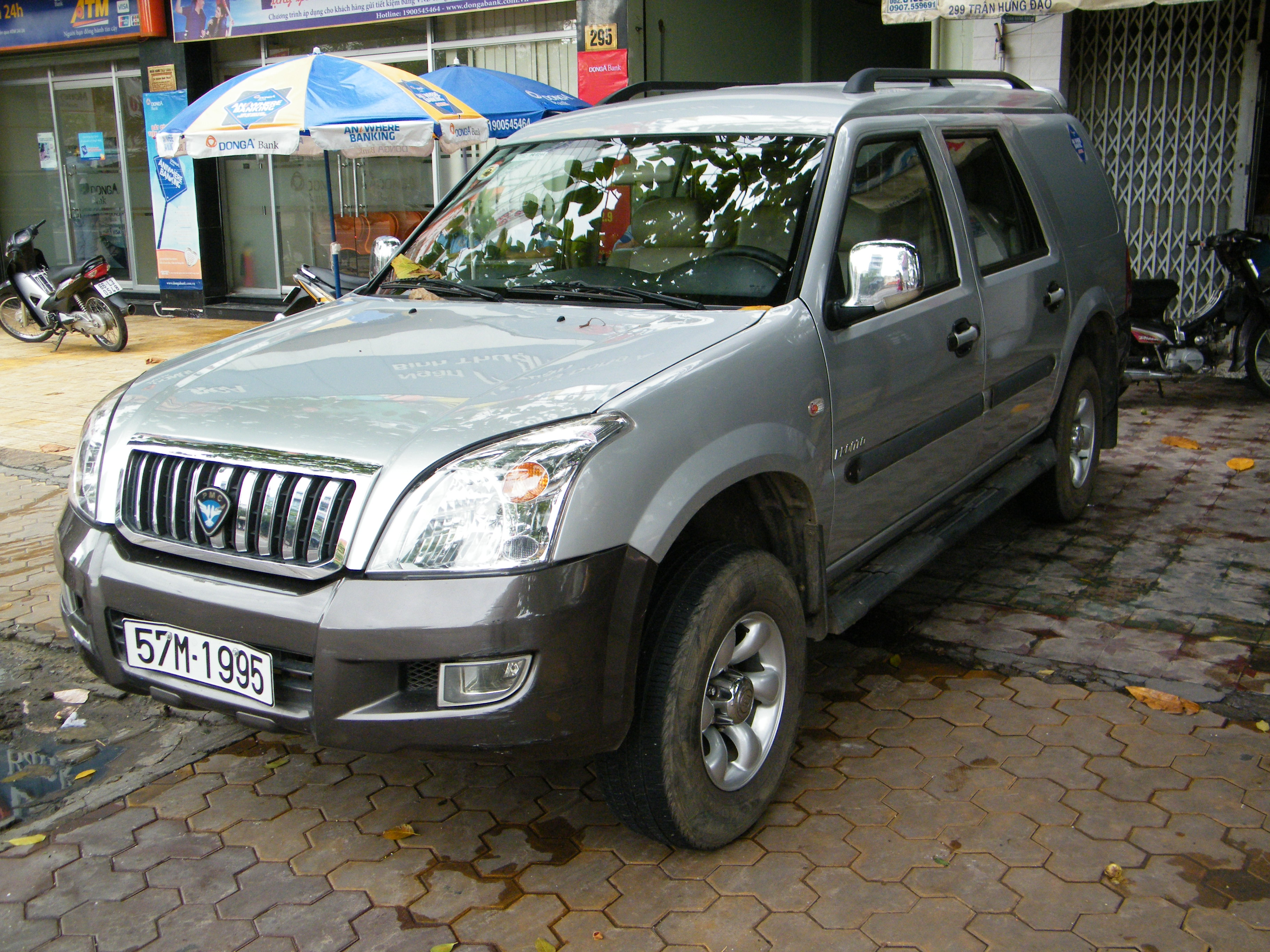
Pronto GS

Model	Production	Status	Body style	Country of production
Hwiparam	2002 to 2006	Mass production	Saloon	North Korea
Hwiparam II	since 2007	Import	Saloon	China
Hwiparam III	since 2010	Import	Saloon	China
Hwiparam 1607	since 2013	Import	Saloon	China
Hwiparam 1613	since 2013	Import	Saloon	China
Paso 990	since 2011	Mass production	Minivan	Vietnam
Ppeokkugi	2003 to 2004	Mass production	Van	North Korea
Ppeokkugi II	2004 to 2006	Mass production	SUV	North Korea
Ppeokkugi III	since 2004	Mass production	SUV and Pick-up	North Korea
Ppeokkugi 4WD	2005 to 2007	Mass production	SUV	North Korea
Ppeokkugi 4WD-A	since 2010	Mass production	SUV	North Korea
Ppeokkugi 4WD-B	since 2008	Mass production	SUV	North Korea
Ppeokkugi 4WD-C	since 2009	Mass production	SUV and Pick-up	Vietnam
Premio DX	2004 to 2009	Mass production	SUV and Pick-up	Vietnam
Premio DX II	since 2009	Mass production	SUV and Pick-up	Vietnam
Premio MAX	since 2007	Mass production	SUV and Pick-up	Vietnam
Pronto DX	2004 to 2009	Mass production	SUV	Vietnam
Pronto GS	since 2009	Mass production	SUV	Vietnam
Samchunri	since 2005	Import	Mid-size van	China
Zunma	2005 to 2006	Import	Saloon	North Korea
Zunma	since 2008	Mass production	Saloon	North Korea
Zunma 1606	since 2013	Import	Saloon	China
Zunma 2008	since 2013	Import	Saloon	China

=== Hwiparam model range ===
- Hwiparam I, 2002, based on the Fiat Siena.
- Hwiparam II, 2007, based on the Brilliance Junjie/BS4/M2.
- Hwiparam 1504/Hwiparam III, 2010, based on the Brilliance FSV.
- Hwiparam 1516, 2014, based on the FAW Oley
- Hwiparam 1518, based on the Brilliance H330
- Hwiparam 1607, 2013, rebadged first generation Volkswagen Jetta from the Chinese market
- Hwiparam 1610 , 2010, based on the Besturn B50
- Hwiparam 1613, 2013, rebadged second generation Volkswagen Jetta from the Chinese market
- Hwiparam 1622, based on the Toyota Corolla (E170)
- Hwiparam 2005, 2013, based on the Brilliance BS6
- Hwiparam 2009, 2013, based on the Besturn B90

=== Ppeokkugi model range ===
- Ppeokkugi (Peokkugi) 1, 2003, based on the Fiat Doblò. Known to keep the Fiat vehicle badge.
- Ppeokkugi (Peokkugi) 2, 2004, based on the Shuguang Conqueror (DG6472).
- Ppeokkugi (Peokkugi) 3, 2004, based on the Huanghai Plutus.
- Ppeokkugi (Peokkugi) 4, 2005, based on the Shuguang Dawn.
- Ppeokkugi 1507, 2013, based on the Great Wall Voleex C10
- Ppeokkugi 1509, 2013, based on the FAW Senya S80
- Ppeokkugi 1515, based on the Beijing Auto E150EV
- Ppeokkugi 2008, 2013, based on the Beijing Jeep Zhanqi BJ2024
- Ppeokkugi 2013, 2015, based on the Bestune X80
- Ppeokkugi 2015, based on the Haval H5
- Ppeokkugi 2019, based on the Haval H9
- Ppeokkugi 2021, based on the first generation Haval H5
- Ppeokkugi 2405, 2009, based on the Huanghai Qisheng CUV
- Ppeokkugi 4WD-1, 2009, based on the Huanghai Landscape F1
- Ppeokkugi 2406, 2013, based on the first generation Haval H5
- Ppeokkugi 2417, based on the Changfeng Liebao Q6

=== Samcheonri model range ===
- Samcheonri 0102/Samcheonri I, 2005, based on the Jinbei Haise van.
- Samcheonri 0107, based on the King Long Jinwei high roof van
- Samcheonri 0606, based on the King Long Jinwei ambulance
- Samcheonri 0708, based on the Jiabao V52 7-seater
- Samcheonri 0711, based on the Jiabao V80
- Samcheonri 0713, based on the JAC Refine M5
- Samcheonri 0808, based on the Jiabao V52 8-seater
- Samcheonri 0901, based on the Jinbei Haise
- Samcheonri 0903, based on the Jinbei Haise
- Samcheonri 0904, based on the King Long Jinwei 9-seater high roof van
- Samcheonri 1105, based on the King Long Jinwei 11-seater high roof van
- Samcheonri 2103, based on the Jinbei Haise

=== Changjeon model range ===
- Changjeon 0208, 2015, based on the Huanghai Raytour
- Changjeon 1610, based on the Maxus V80
- Changjeon 1703, based on the King Long Kaige 17 seater minibus
- Changjeon 1902, based on the Toyota Coaster
- Changjeon 2103, based on the King Long Kaige 21 seater minibus
- Changjeon 2302 based on a King Long coach model with 23 seats
- Changjeon 3001, based on a King Long coach model with 30 seats
- Changjeon 3019, based on the Higer KLQ6758

=== Zunma model range ===
- Zunma, 2005, based on the SsangYong Chairman.
- Zunma 1606, 2013, based on the FAW-Volkswagen Sagitar.
- Zunma 1811, based on the Bestune B70
- Zunma 2008, 2013, based on the FAW-Volkswagen Magotan

=== Further models and partnerships ===
In summer 2006, the North Korean government magazine Foreign Trade of the DPRK, which advertises North Korean products, published a photograph of a new luxury car produced by Pyeonghwa, the Junma, which appears to be a rebadged version of the South Korean SsangYong Chairman.

The Junma bears a strong resemblance to SsangYong cars, specifically the Chairman, which are favored by North Korean government officials. The chairman is based on an old Mercedes E-Class design.

In 2006, Pyeonghwa reached an agreement with Chinese manufacturer Brilliance China Auto to assemble its Jinbei Haise vans, which are based on an old version of the Toyota HiAce.

In 2007, Pyeonghwa introduced Brilliance's Junjie car under the name Hwiparam II. The original Fiat-based Hwiparam has appeared on Pyeonghwa's web site.

In 2009, Pyeonghwa announced a profit on its North Korean operations.

The Premio and Pronto are also sold in Vietnam by Mekong Auto. Both are based on Huanghai vehicles. Mekong Auto has sold Fiat cars in Vietnam since 1995, and this relationship may have led to Pyeonghwa assembling Fiats in North Korea.

== Advertising ==
As of 2010, Pyeonghwa is the only company in North Korea to advertise. A series of billboards and TV commercials have been made in an effort to show residents that their country is able to produce products such as motor vehicles. The ads may be aimed primarily at expatriate businessmen in Pyongyang, but Car and Driver magazine suggests that they are actually propaganda aimed at the local population, to make them believe that their country is economically successful.

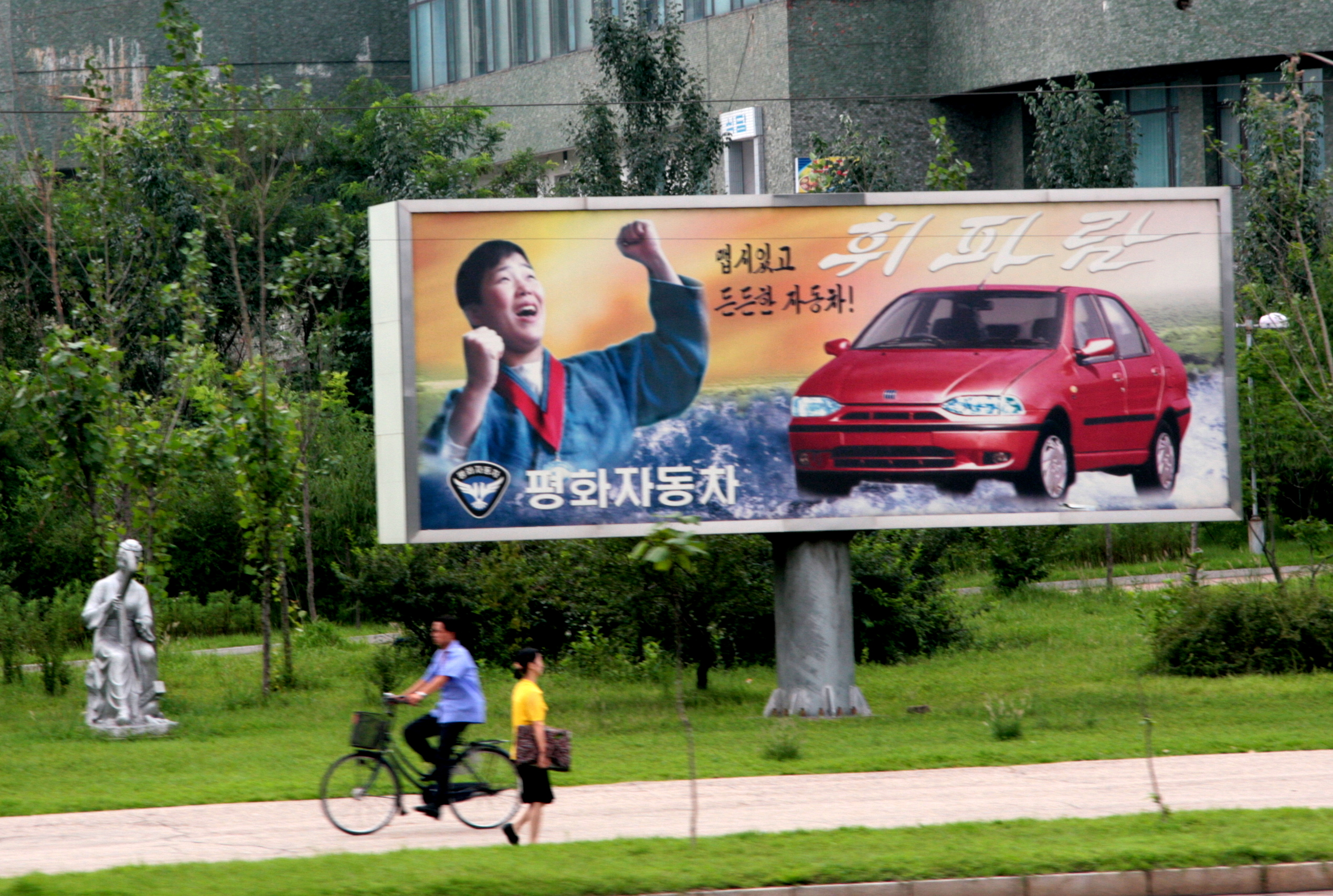
Pyonghwa Motors billboard showing the Hwiparam.

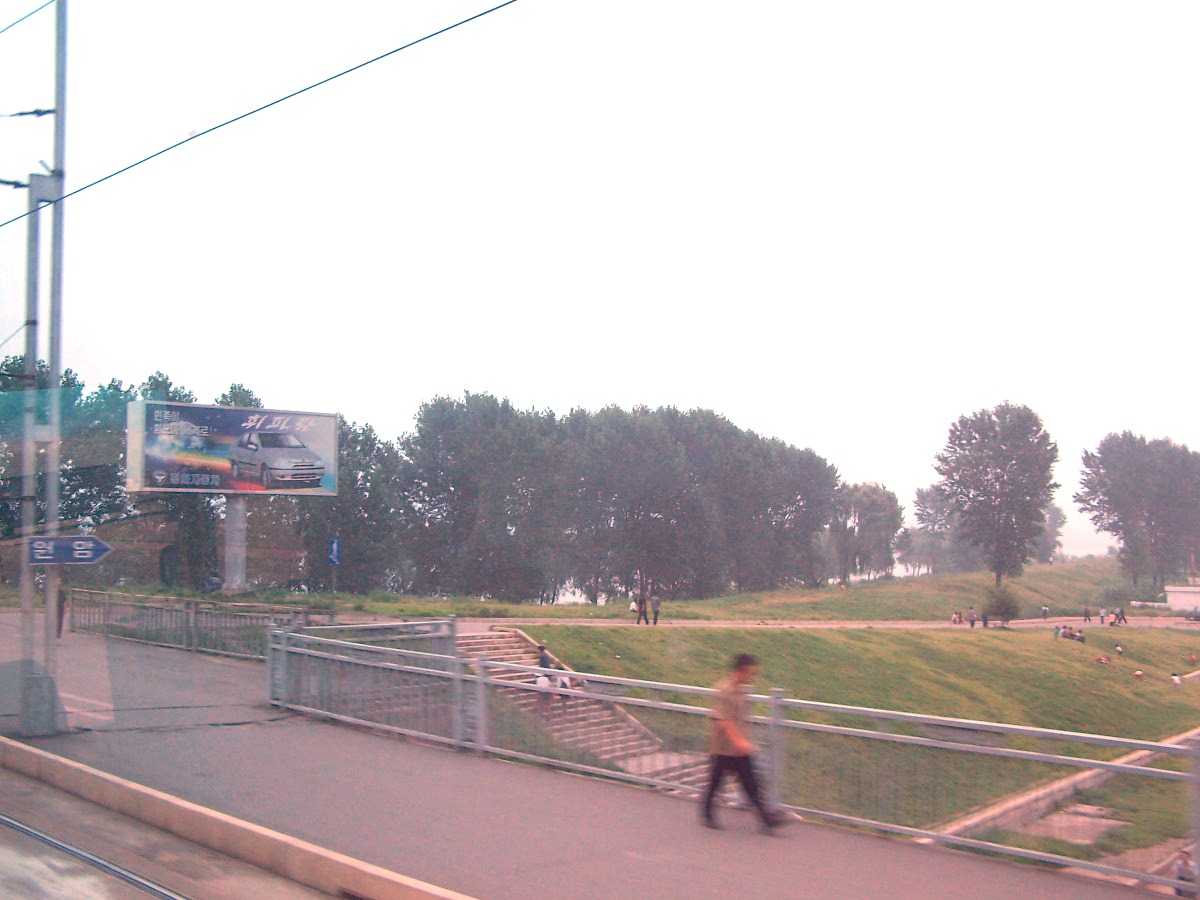
An advertising board of "Pyeonghwa Motors" in Pyongyang.

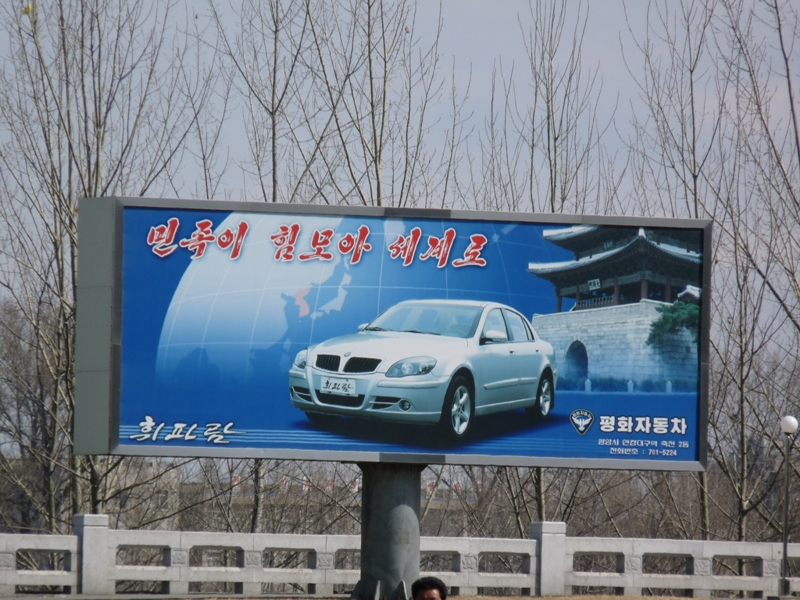
Pyonghwa Motors billboard showing the Hwiparam II

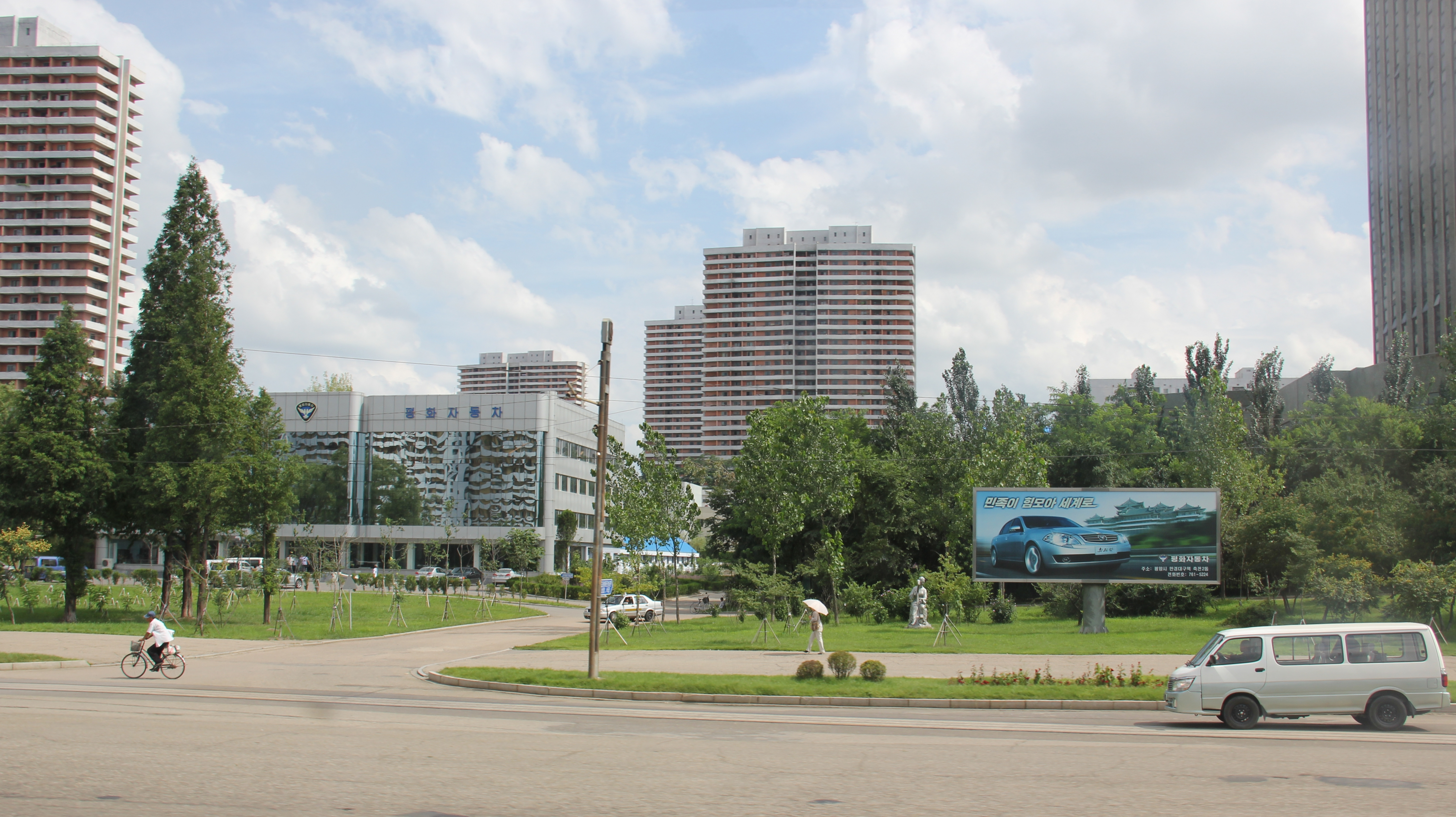
Pyonghwa Motors billboard showing the Hwiparam III

== See also ==
- Unification Church and North Korea
