= Brilliance BS4 =

Compact car produced by Brilliance Auto (2006-2014)

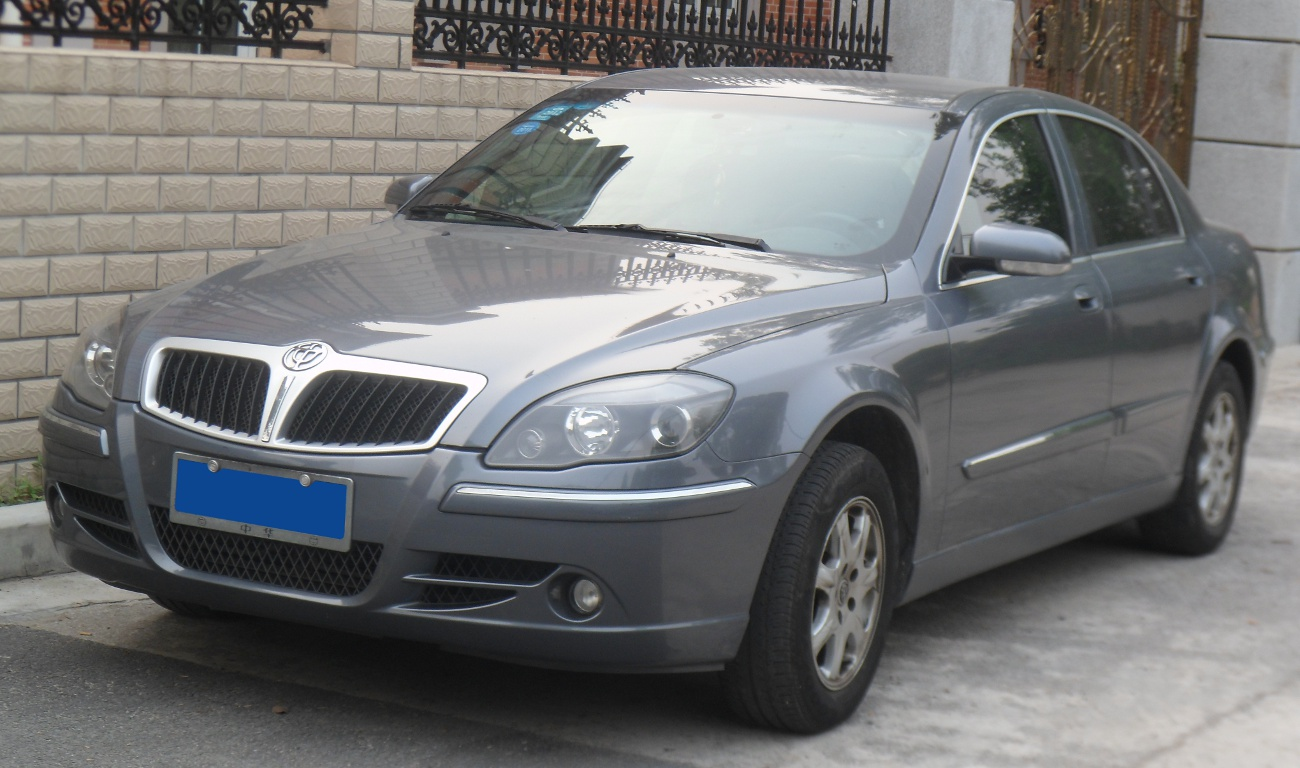

Overview
- Manufacturer: Brilliance Auto
- Also called: Brilliance M2; Brilliance Splendor; Huachen Junjie; Zhonghua Junjie; Pyeonghwa Hwiparam II (North Korea)
- Production: 2006–2014
- Assembly: Shenyang, Liaoning, China; 6th of October City, Egypt (BAG)
- Designer: Pininfarina

Body and chassis
- Class: Compact car (C)
- Body style: 4-door sedan 5-door wagon
- Layout: Front-engine, front-wheel-drive
- Related: Brilliance BS6

Powertrain
- Engine: 1.6 L BL16L I4; 1.6 L 4G18 I4; 1.8 L BL18T turbo I4; 1.8 L 4G93 I4; 2.0 L 4G63 I4
- Transmission: 6-speed manual 5-speed manual 5-speed automatic 4-speed automatic

Dimensions
- Wheelbase: 2,790 mm (109.8 in)
- Length: 4,650 mm (183.1 in)
- Width: 1,800 mm (70.9 in)
- Height: 1,450 mm (57.1 in)
- Curb weight: 1,415 kg (3,120 lb)

The Brilliance BS4 or M2 is a compact car produced by Brilliance Auto in the People's Republic of China, where it is known as the Zhonghua Junjie. The car was scheduled for launch in Germany, Europe's largest national car market, in 2007.

Following poor crash test results of the BS6 model and ensuing press comments, a Western launch was postponed in the last minute. German sales were expected to start in the autumn of 2008 when the vehicle's structure was expected to have been modified in order to achieve improved European crash test ratings. However, after these modifications, it still achieved 0 stars.

The BS4 was allegedly developed in cooperation with Porsche and used borrowed technology from BMW. A station wagon, designed by Lowie Vermeersch, was made available in 2008. Due to declining sales, the M2 and all versions were discontinued in all regions in 2014 with no current successor.

== Body ==
=== Seating ===
The BS4/M2 can seat a total of five people. The three back passenger seats has average mid-size car leg room.

=== Trims ===
The vehicle had a total of seven trims; 1.6MT, 1.6MT Deluxe, 1.8MT, 1.8MT Deluxe, 1.8AT, 1.8AT Deluxe, and 1.8AT Premium. The most basic trim (1.16MT) lacked side airbags, a tyre pressure gauge, an anti-engine theft system and a parking radar. Bluetooth and GPS were present on the 1.8T AT Premium trim.

== Engine ==
Initially, the BS4 was offered with an old Mitsubishi designed 1.8 L four cylinder engine claiming 136 PS (100 kW; 134 hp) of output. A turbocharged 1.8 L unit developed by Brilliance themselves, with outputs of 150 PS (110 kW; 148 hp) or 170 PS (125 kW; 168 hp), is already included on domestic market models. A diesel engine for installation in the European market version is still under development.

== Transmission ==
The turbocharged BS4 is available only with a four-speed automatic transmission, but for the European-spec base version, a "sloppy" five-speed manual gearbox is offered.

== Ride and handling ==
According to Auto Express, ride quality is "reasonably comfortable", but steering is "vague".

== Equipment ==
The car has electronically adjustable leather seats, air conditioning and electronic parking assistance. Interior plastic is described as "harsh and cheap" and leather quality as "cheap". ESC, which has become mainstream for European cars of this class, is not offered.

== Commercial ==
A precise date for a European press launch of the BS4 was never announced.

The car was produced under licence by North Korean automaker Pyeonghwa as the Pyeonghwa Hwiparam II.

=== Sales ===
In the year it was launched in China, over 30,000 cars were sold. In 2013, 2,414 cars were sold.

It was sold for less than two full years in Europe before being pulled from the market by the company in 2010, due to a lack of sales caused by quality issues and safety concerns. As per official figures, 598 BS4 were delivered in Europe.

== Gallery ==
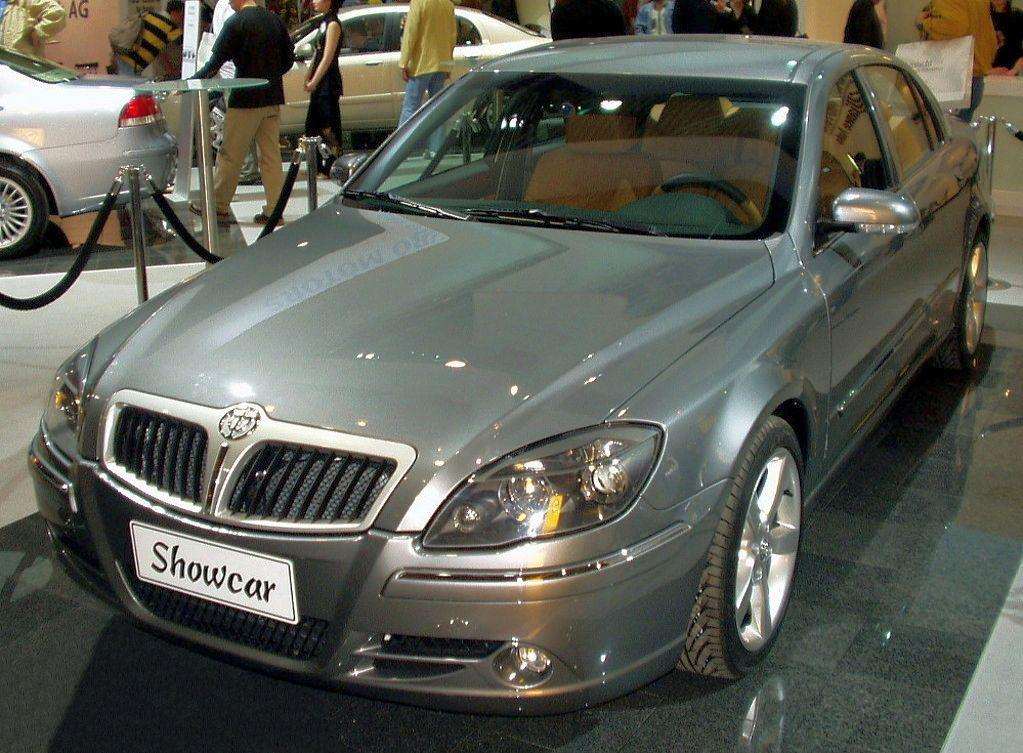
Zhonghua Showcar

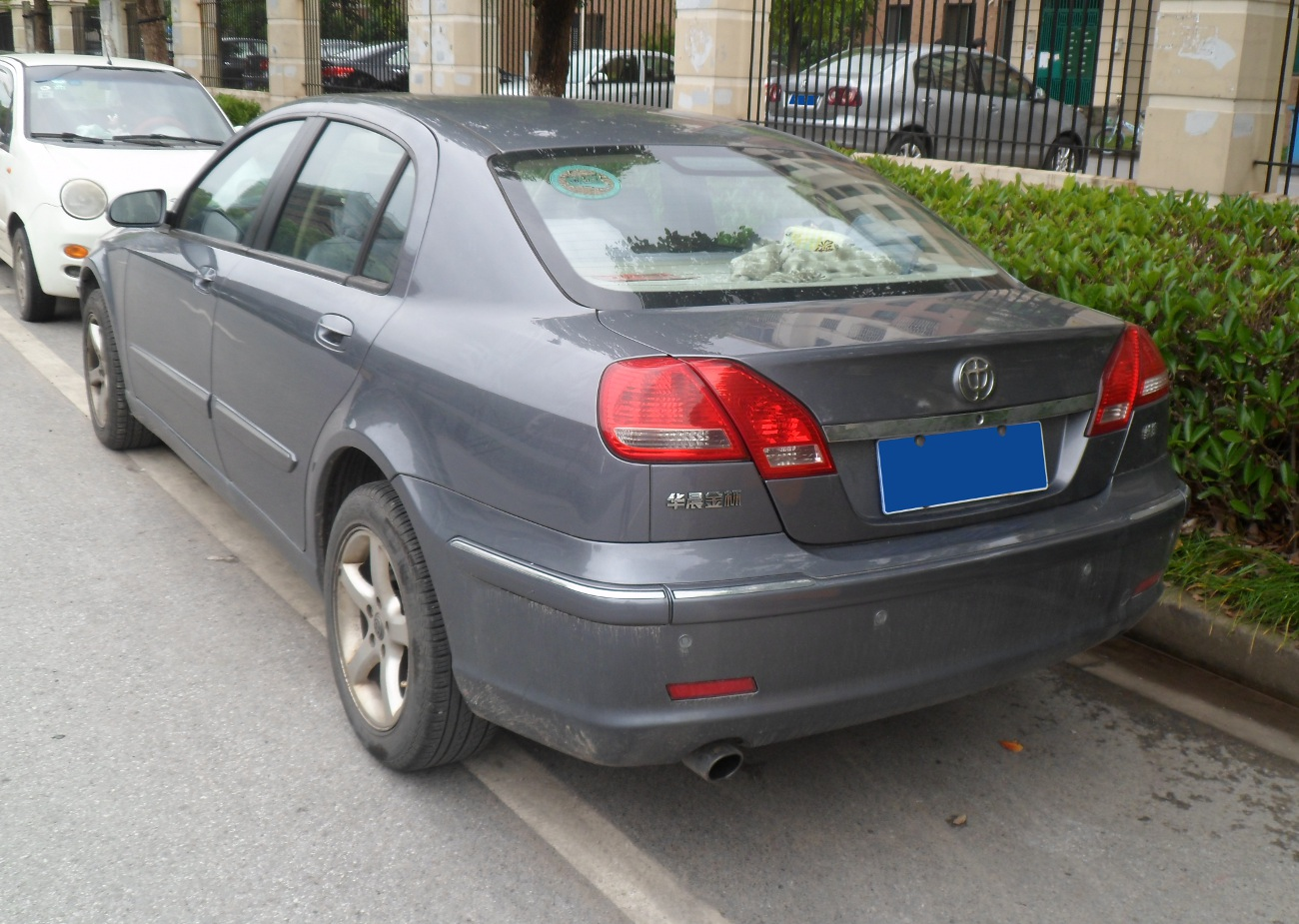
The back of the Brilliance Junjie

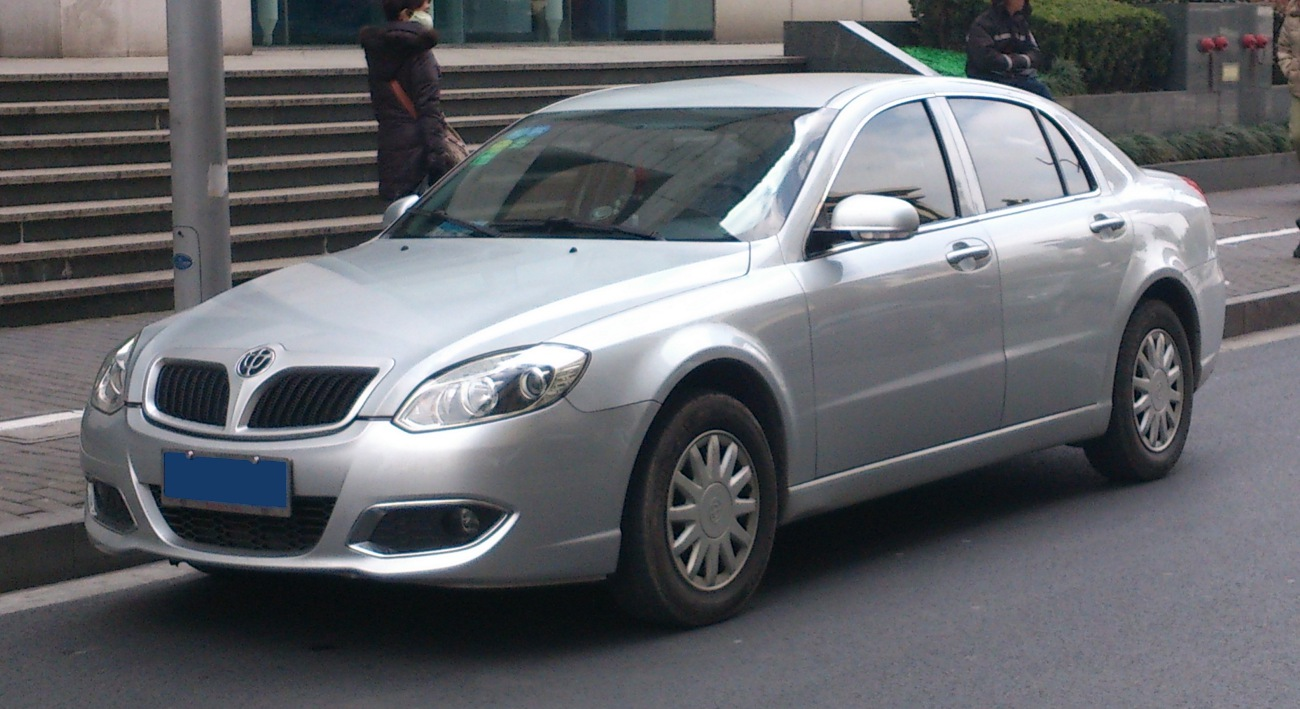
Brilliance Junjie Facelift

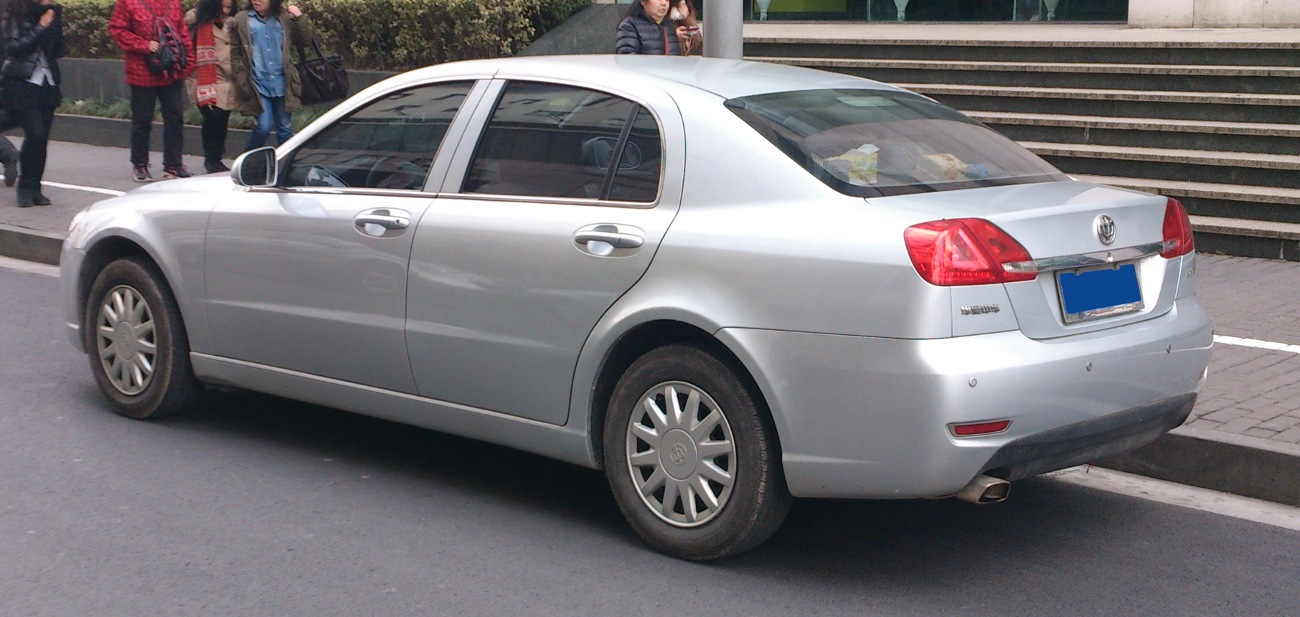
Brilliance Junjie Facelift

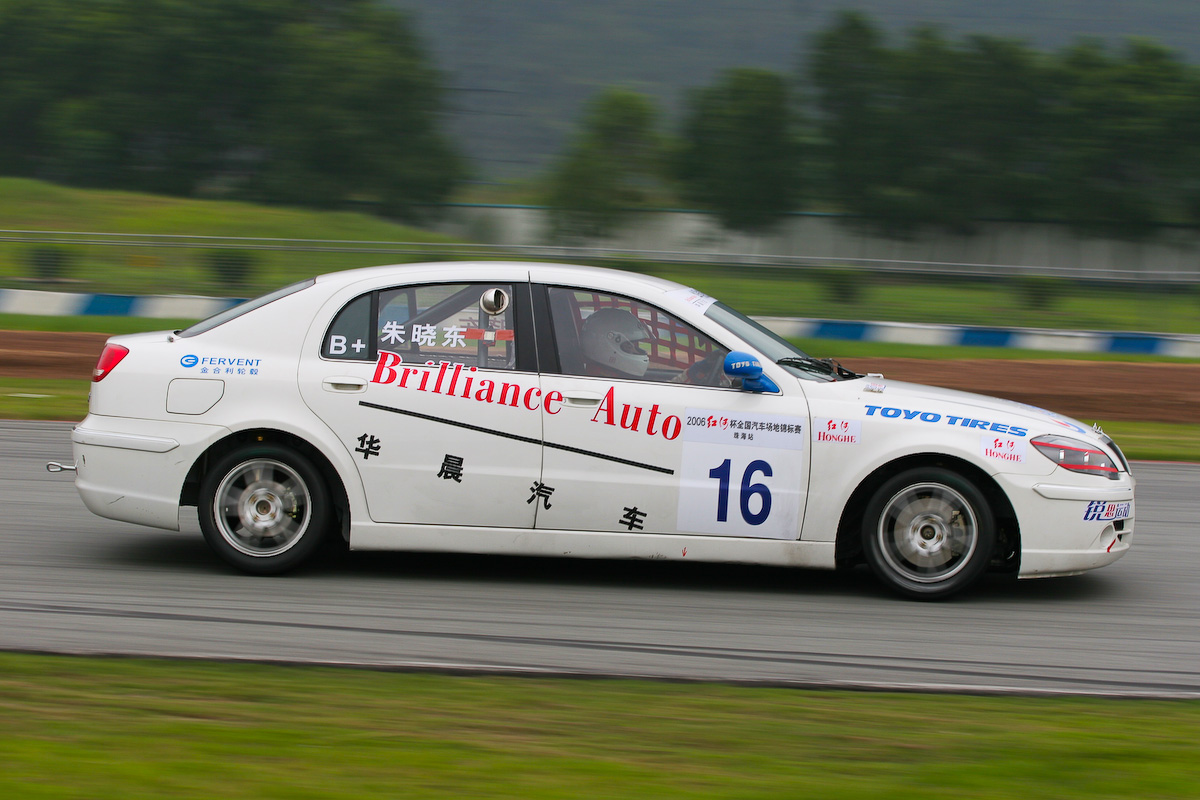
Brilliance BS4 in the 2006 China Circuit Championship

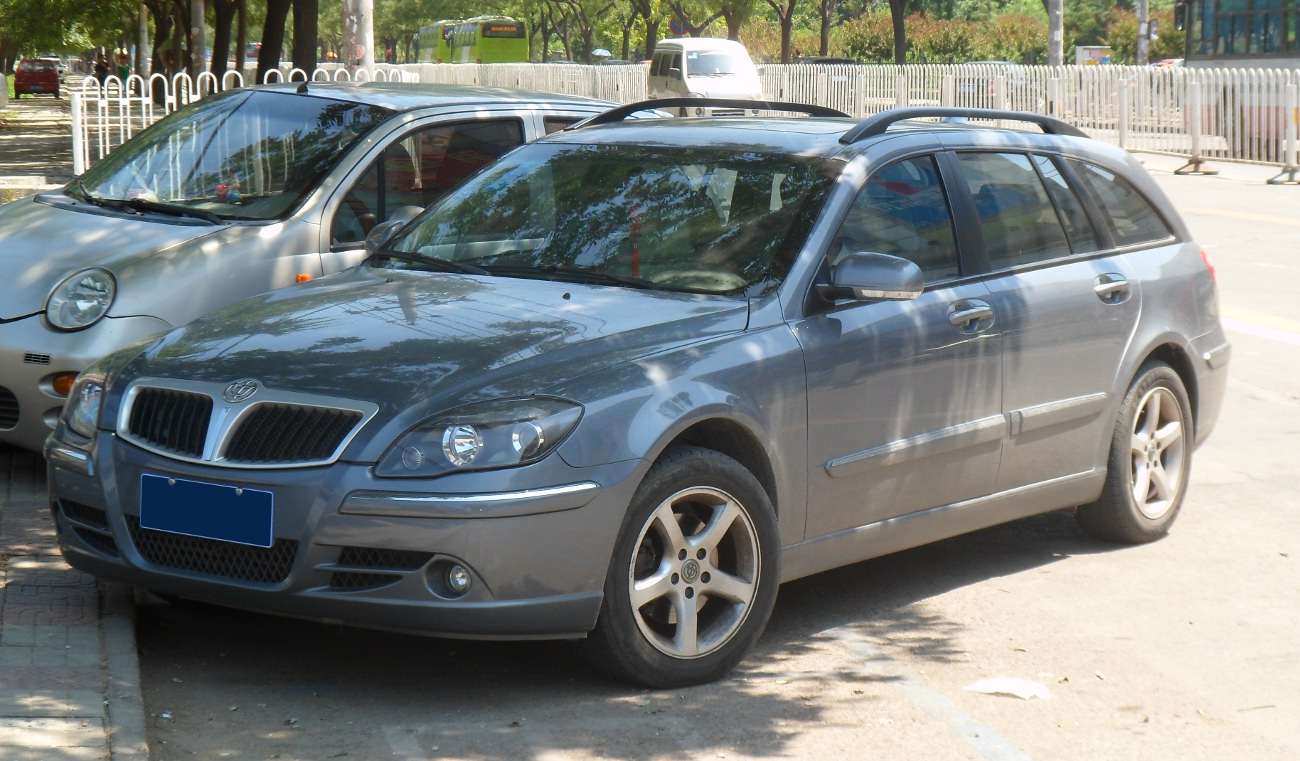
Brilliance Junjie Wagon (Front)

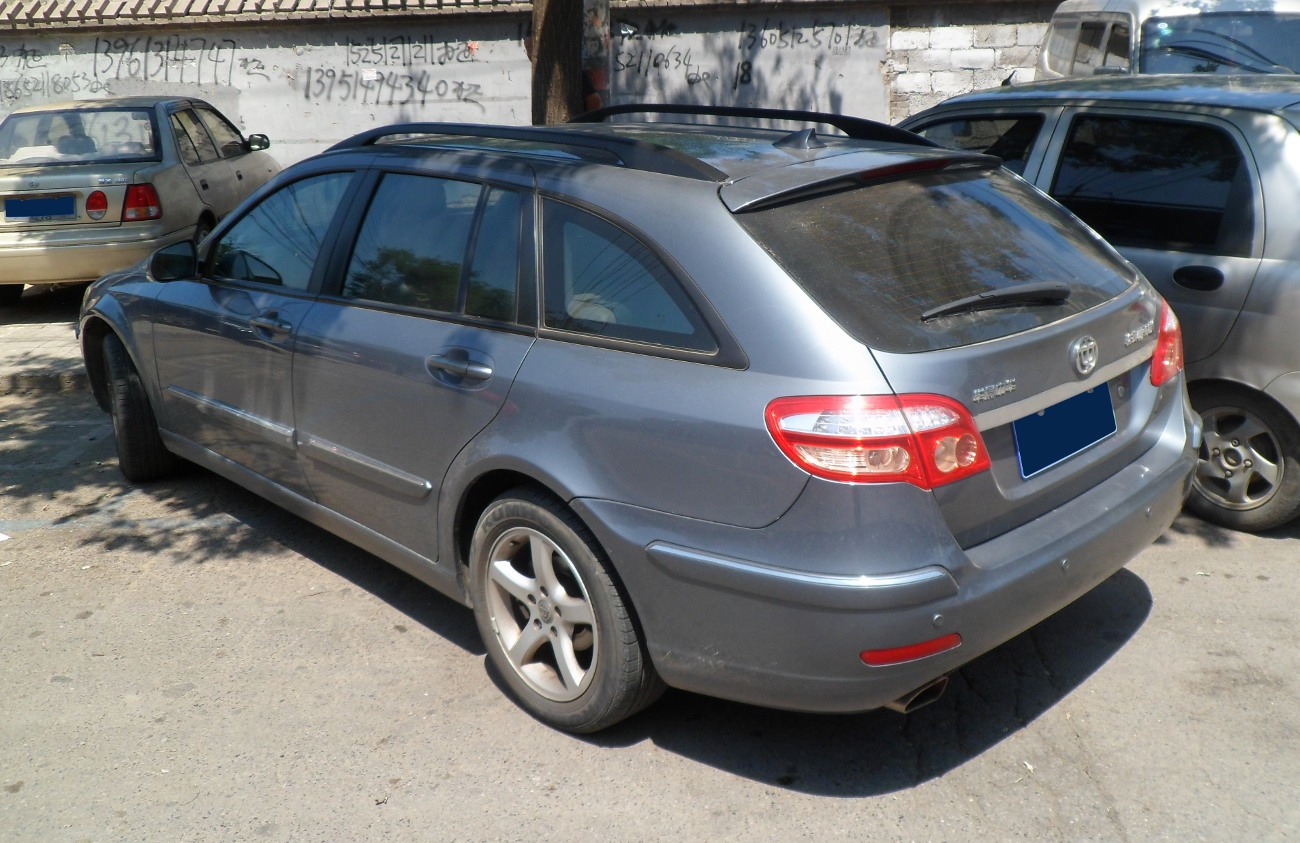
Brilliance Junjie Wagon (Back)

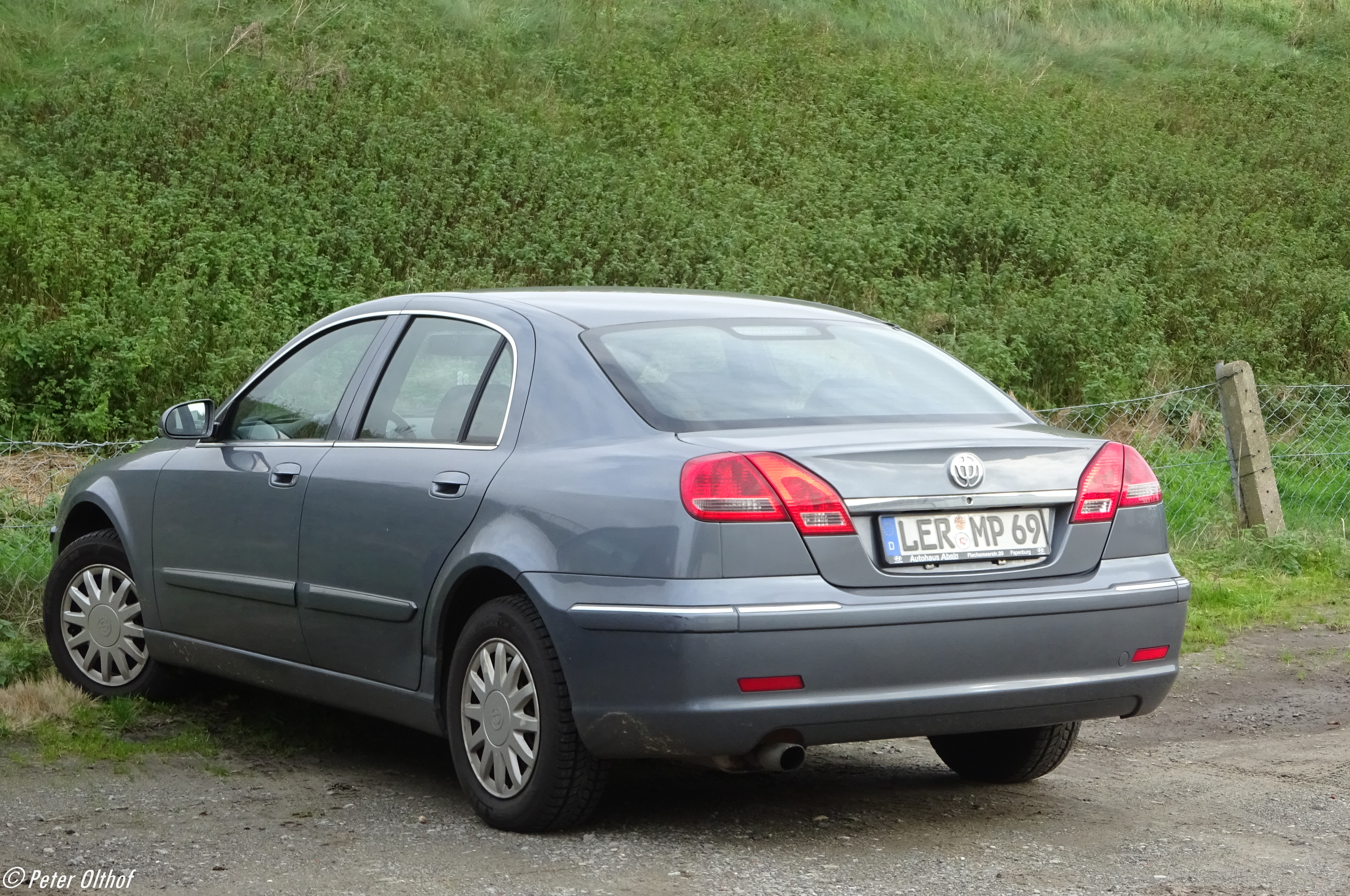
Brilliance BS4 sedan in Germany (Back)

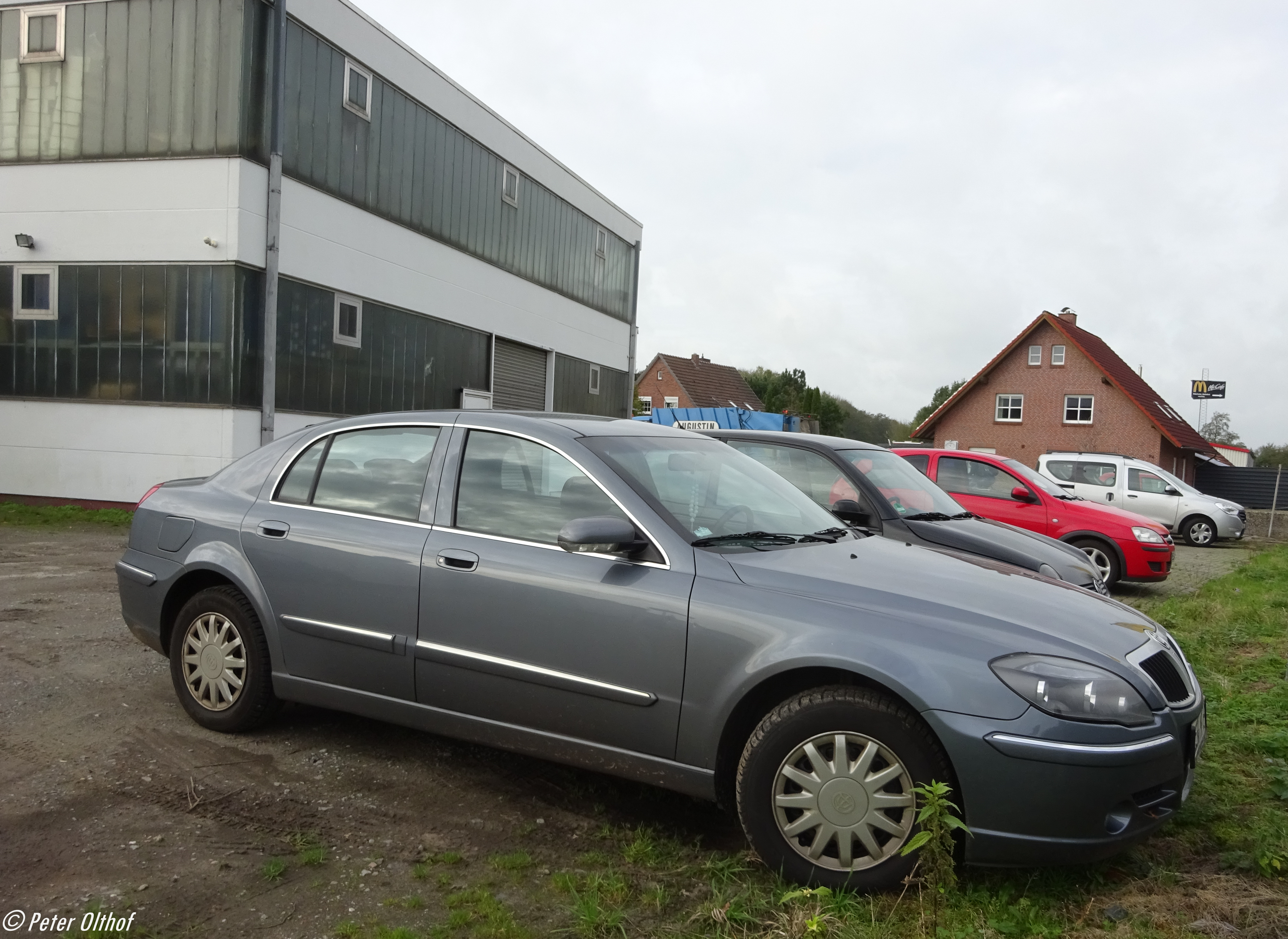
Brilliance BS4 sedan in Germany (Front)

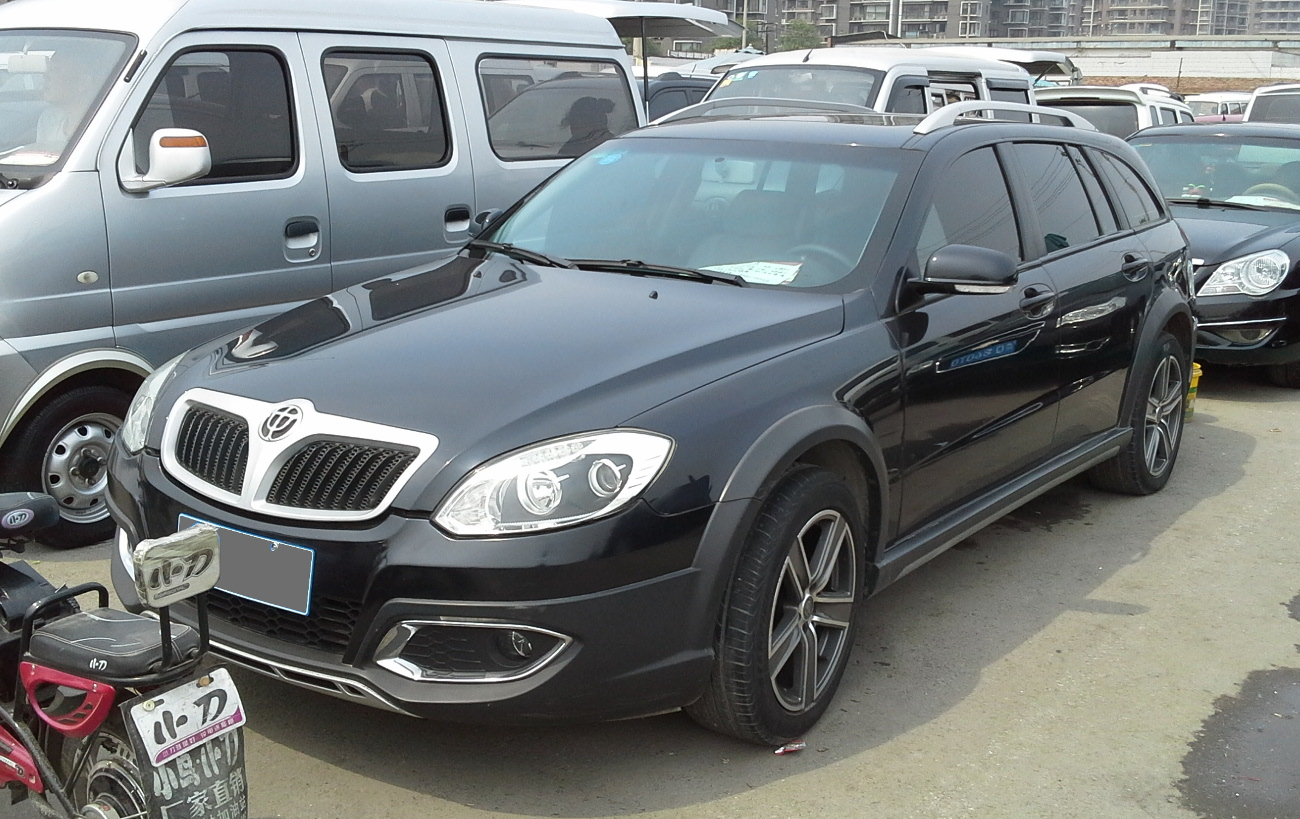
Brilliance Junjie Wagon Cross (Front)
