= Brilliance BS6 =

Chinese full-size car

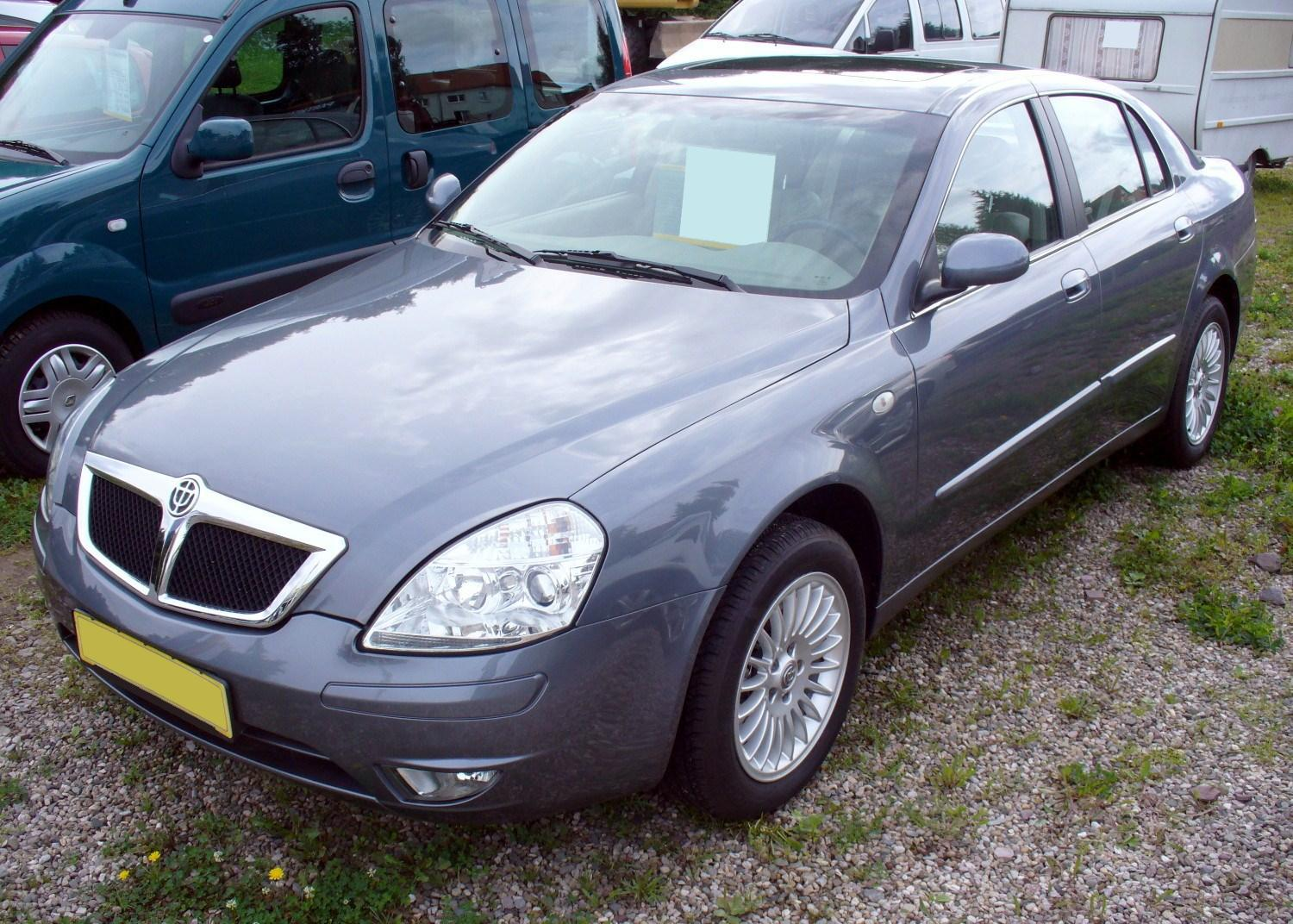

Overview
- Manufacturer: Brilliance Auto
- Also called: Zhonghua Zunchi; Brilliance M1; Brilliance Zhonghua; Pyeonghwa Hwiparam 2005 (North Korea)
- Production: 2002–2016
- Assembly: 6th of October, Egypt (BAG)
- Designer: Italdesign Giugiaro

Body and chassis
- Class: Full-size car

Powertrain
- Engine: 1.8 L BL18T I4 (turbo petrol); 2.0 L BL20L I4
- Transmission: 5 speed manual/automatic

Dimensions
- Wheelbase: 2,790 mm (109.8 in)
- Length: 4,880 mm (192.1 in)
- Width: 1,800 mm (70.9 in)
- Height: 1,450 mm (57.1 in)

The Brilliance BS6, in China sold as Zhonghua Zunchi (Chinese: 中华尊驰), and later as the Brilliance M1 is a full-size car produced by Brilliance Auto in China. It was originally developed by Italdesign Giugiaro and launched as the Brilliance Zhonghua in December 2000.

== History ==
First shown in late 2000, the Brilliance entered production in 2002. The chassis had been developed with input from Porsche. The design was overhauled by Pininfarina in late 2006, and it received a further facelifts in 2009. A final revision in 2012 also brought a new name, as it became the Brilliance M1. Sales in the home market ended in 2016.

== Safety ==
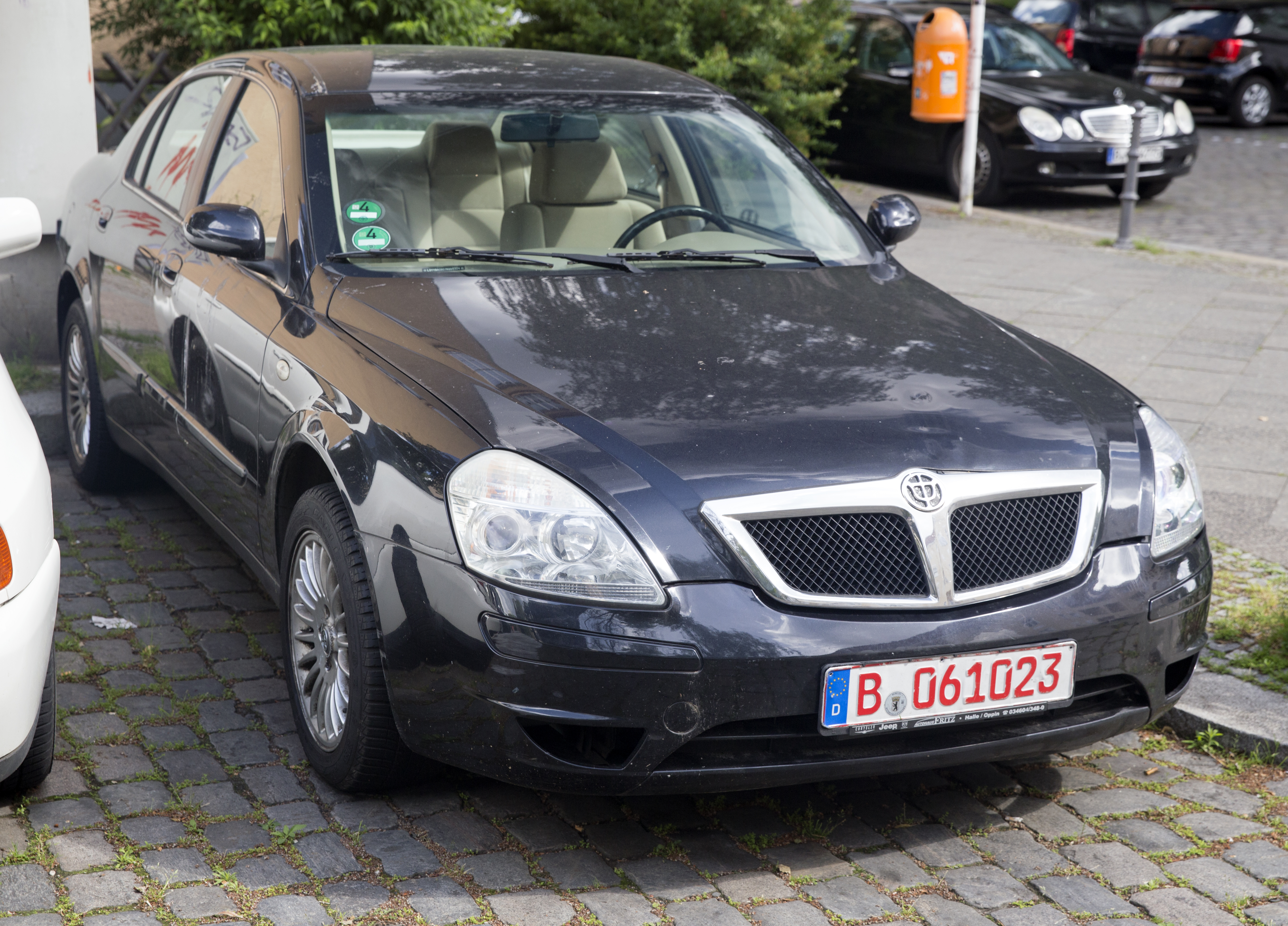
A German-registered Brilliance BS6

A few cars were imported to Europe (mainly Germany) by an independent Belgian-based importer for a short period beginning in 2006, but deliveries were suspended after a Euro NCAP crash test arranged by the ADAC (the General German Automobile Club). The car only managed to achieve one of the possible five stars, a result described as "catastrophic" and "disastrous". A second star was denied because on a side impact test, biometric limits were exceeded. Due to the severe deformation of the car, the likelihood of occupants surviving the crash was low. However, according to a wire report carried by Forbes.com, a heavily strengthened version of BS6 was later tested in Spain.

== European exports ==
The Brilliance BS6 had a starting purchase price of 18,000 Euros, similar in price to established competitors like the Ford Mondeo and Volkswagen Passat. Brilliance was planning to market the car in the United States, but its price would have been at least US$25,000, slightly higher than the already established Toyota Camry. Efforts to sell the car in Europe stalled after importer HSO Motors filed for bankruptcy in November 2009, in part due to the high price of the cars. According to automotive data provider JATO Dynamics, combined European Union sales of the BS4 and BS6 were only 502 units from 2007 to 2009, with only 46 BS6's sold in the EU in 2009. Sales ended in early 2010, but nonetheless, Brilliance then returned to the European market as Shenhua Motors GmbH.

The Brilliance Group had plans to develop a diesel-engined version for the European market, but this never came to fruition. All in all, Brilliance reportedly sold 356 examples of the BS6 in Europe: 75 in 2007, 200 in 2008, 46 in 2009, and a final 35 examples in 2010.

== Gallery ==
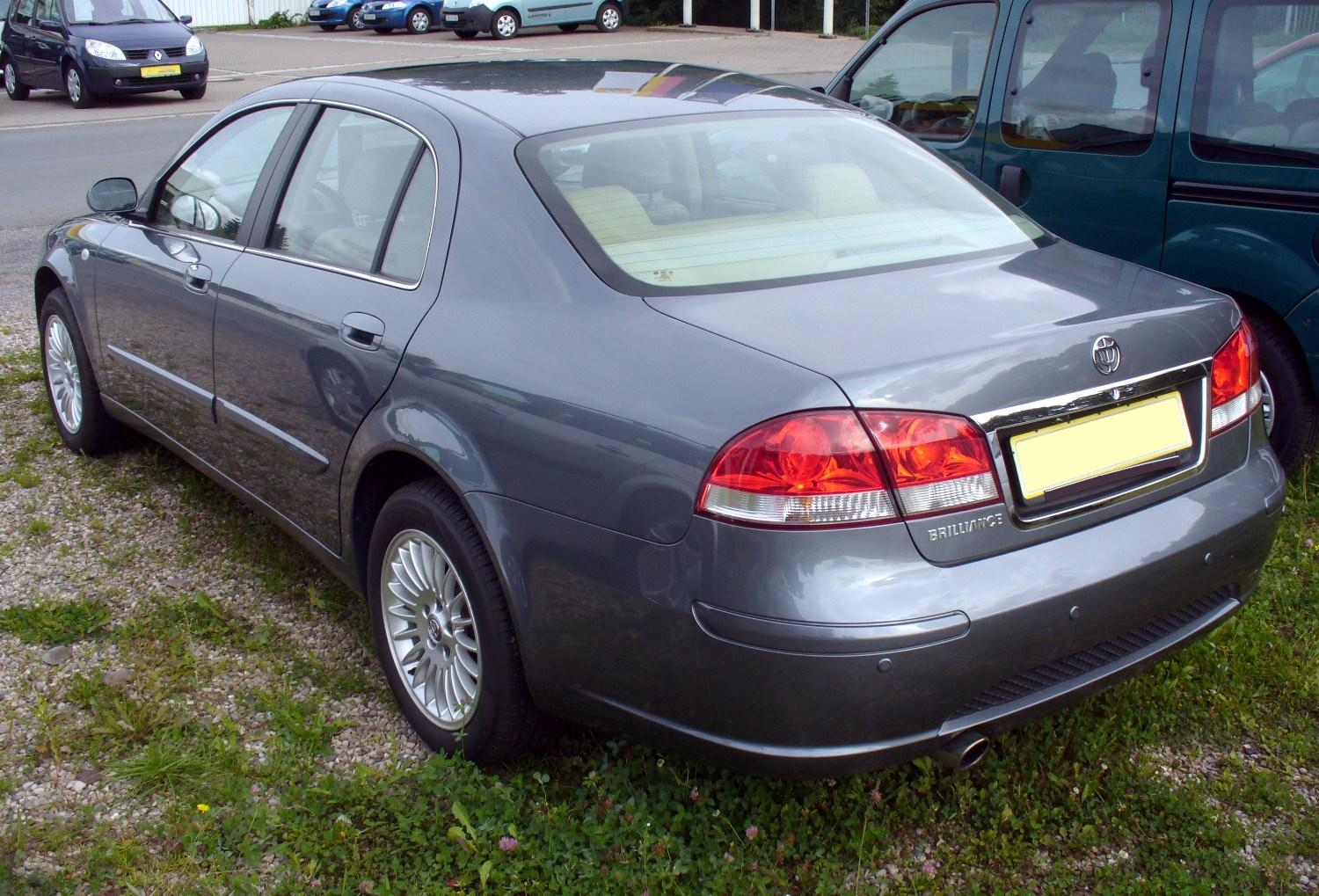
Brilliance BS6

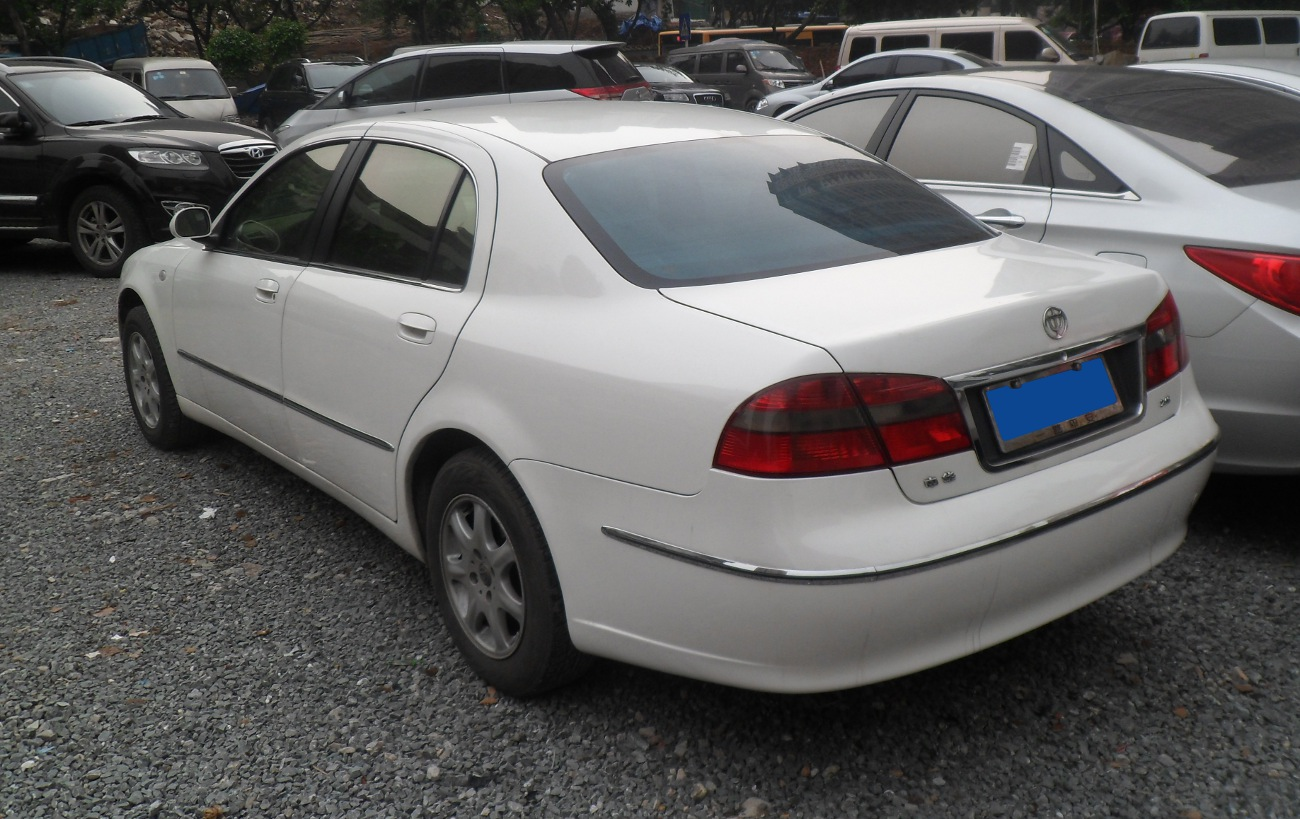
Zhonghua Zunchi, pre-facelift

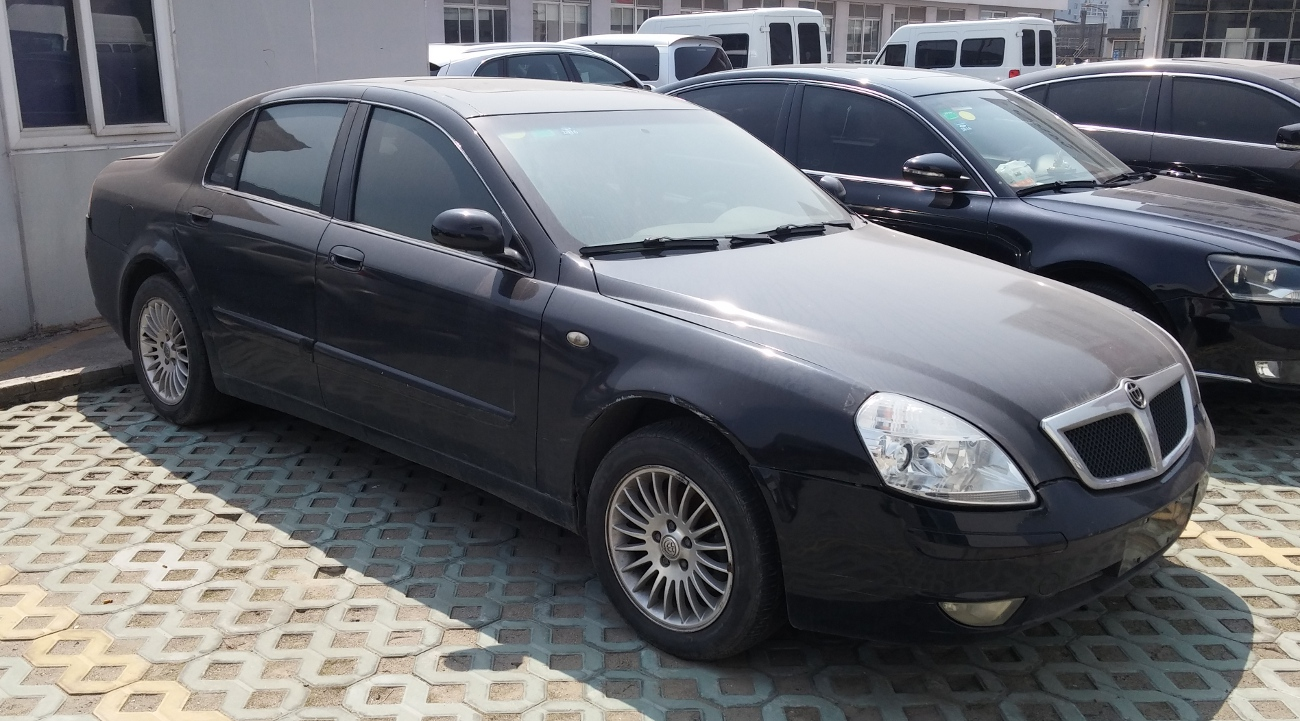
Zhonghua Zunchi, first facelift

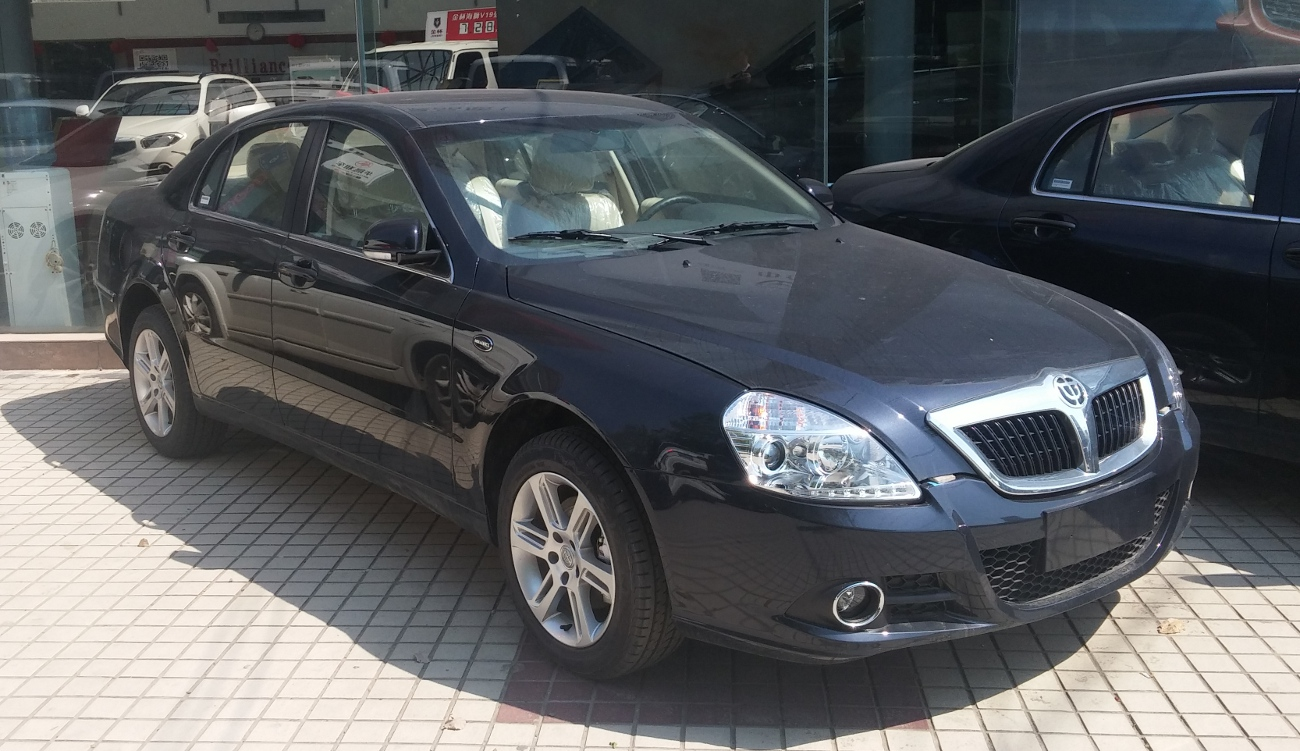
Zhonghua Zunchi, second facelift
