= Hwaseong =

Hwaseong or Hwasong can refer to:

- Hwaseong, Gyeonggi, a city in the South Korean province of Gyeonggi
  - Hwaseong Stadium, a group of sports facilities
- Hwaseong Fortress, a UNESCO heritage site in Suwon City, Gyeonggi Province, South Korea
- Hwasŏng (North Korea), a county in North Hamgyong province, North Korea, now known as Myonggan County
- Hwasong concentration camp, a political prison camp in North Hamgyong province, North Korea
- Hwasong rocket family of North Korea
  - Hwasong-1 (R-17 Elbrus)
  - Hwasong-3 (9K52 Luna-M / 2K6 Luna)
  - Hwasong-5, North Korean version of the Scud ballistic missile
  - Hwasong-6, also a North Korean version of the Scud ballistic missile
  - Hwasong-7 (Rodong-1), another North Korean version of the Scud ballistic missile
  - Hwasong-8, a ballistic missile
  - Hwasong-9 (Rodong-1M)
  - Hwasong-10
  - Hwasong-11 (KN-02 Toksa)
  - Hwasong-12
  - Hwasong-13 (KN-08)
  - Hwasong-14, July 2017 version of the North Korean ICBM
  - Hwasong-15
  - Hwasong-17
  - Hwasong-18
  - Hwasong-19
  - Hwasong-20
