= Hwasong (missile family) =

North Korean missile family

The Hwasong (Korean: 화성; lit. 'Mars'), or recently called Hwasongpho (화성포; lit. 'Mars Artillery') is a North Korean family of ballistic missile.

== Description ==
The Hwasong means Mars in Korean. "Hwasong" also means "powerful", "innovative" or "sacrifice". However, North Korea has not clarified why they name their ballistic missiles after the planet Mars.

According to The Hankyoreh, the missiles in Hwasong series tend to be more complicated and increase in range as the designation number grows.

The Hwasong designation number also indicates the North Korea's missile development timelines.

In North Korea, Hwasong is also the name of a concentration camp.

=== Hwasongpho designation ===
While English-language media outlets use the simplied "Hwasong", North Korean state media currently uses "Hwasongpho" to refer to its ballistic missiles.

The original Hwasong naming standard was changed to Hwasongpho at an unknown date. This naming standard was first confirmed in October 2021, when the Hwasongpho designations of Hwasong-11B, Hwasong-15 and Hwasong-17 were spotted, although the first usage of Hwasongpho was in 2017, when the Moranbong Band released a song named Song of Hwasong Artillery (화성포의 노래) after a successful test-fire of Hwasong-14.

== List of missiles ==
Official designation	Korean name	External name(s)	Classfication	Description
Hwasong-1	《화성-1》형		Rocket artillery	Hwasong-1 is the official designation given to North Korea's first indigenous rocket artillery system, likely a locally produced version of Soviet Union's FROG-5 artillery rocket mounted on an indigenous chassis.
Hwasong-2	《화성-2》형			Hwasong-2 is the official designation given to an unfinished, never produced design, likely the surface-to-surface version of S-75 Dvina surface-to-air missile.
Hwasong-3	《화성-3》형	9K52 Luna-M	Rocket artillery	Hwasong-3 is the official designation given to locally produced 9K52 Luna-M artillery rockets from Soviet Union.
Hwasong-4	《화성-4》형		Short-range ballistic missile	Hwasong-4 may refer to an unfinished joint short-range ballistic missile project of North Korea and China, based on the DF-61 design (Note: Unrelated to the 2025 ICBM design of DF-61.) in the late 1970s.
Hwasong-5	《화성-5》형	Scud-B	Short-range ballistic missile	Hwasong-5 is a liquid-fueled, short-range ballistic missile. North Korea began testing the missile in 1984. Hwasong-5's range is estimated to be 300 km (190 mi). The Hwasong-5 was reported to be exported to other countries.
Hwasong-6	《화성-6》형	Scud-C	Short-range ballistic missile	Hwasong-6 is a liquid-fueled, short-range ballistic missile. Its estimated range is 500 km (310 mi). The Hwasong-6 was reported to be exported to other countries.
Hwasong-7	《화성-7》형	Rodong; Nodong; Rodong-1; Nodong-1; Scud-D; Scud Mod-D; Nodong-A	Medium-range ballistic missile	Hwasong-7 is a liquid-fueled, medium-range ballistic missile, which was first tested in May 1990. Its estimated range is 500 km (310 mi).
Hwasong-8	《화성-8》형	Unknown	Medium-range ballistic missile	Hwasong-8 is a liquid-fueled, medium-range ballistic missile, which was first tested in 27 September 2021. Its estimated range is 2,000–4,000 km (1,200–2,500 mi).
Hwasong-9	《화성-9》형	KN-04; Scud-ER	Medium-range ballistic missile	Hwasong-9 is a liquid-fueled, medium-range ballistic missile. It is the enlarged version of Hwasong-6, with extended range, up to 1,000 km (620 mi).
Hwasong-10	《화성-10》형	BM-25; Musudan	Medium-range or intermediate-range ballistic missile	Hwasong-10 is a liquid-fueled, intermediate-range ballistic missile, with an assumed range of 2,500–4,000 km (1,600–2,500 mi).
Hwasong-11	《화성-11》형	KN-02; Toksa	Short-range ballistic missile	Hwasong-11 is a reverse-engineered, locally produced modification of the Soviet's OTR-21 Tochka solid-fueled, short-range ballistic missile. Its maximum range is 120–170 km (75–106 mi). It was first tested in 2006.
Hwasong-11A	《화성포-11가》형	KN-23	Short-range ballistic missile	Hwasong-11A is a single-stage, solid-fueled short-range ballistic missile that has an external resemblance to the Russian Iskander-M and South Korean Hyunmoo-2B short-range ballistic missiles, with a maximum range of 900 km (560 mi). Hwasong-11A made its public debut in 2018 and was first test-fired in May 2019.
Hwasong-11B	《화성포-11나》형	KN-24	Short-range ballistic missile	Hwasong-11B is a single-stage, solid-fueled short-range ballistic missile that has an external resemblance to the United States's ATACMS. Hwasong-11B has a maximum range of 410 km (250 mi). It was first test-fired in August 2019.
Hwasong-11C	《화성포-11다》형	KN-23A; KN-23B; KN-30	Short-range ballistic missile	Hwasong-11C is a single-stage, solid-fueled short-range ballistic missile that is the larger variant of Hwasong-11A with a closely similar design. It was first tested on 25 March 2021. First tested in March 2021, the missile's range is assumed to be about 600 km (370 mi).
Hwasong-11C-4.5	《화성포-11다-4.5》	Unknown	Short-range ballistic missile	Hwasong-11C-4.5 is the larger warhead variant of Hwasong-11C, first test-fired on 1 July 2024.
Hwasong-11D	《화성포-11라》형	KN-35	Tactical ballistic missile Short-range ballistic missile	Hwasong-11D is a single-stage, solid-fueled, short-range ballistic missile that is the smaller variant of Hwasong-11A. Made its public debut in April 2022, the missile's assumed range is similar to original Hwasong-11.
Hwasong-11E	화성-11마	Unknown	Short-range ballistic missile	The Hwasong-11E is a solid-fueled, short-range ballistic missile that is a Hwasong-11C-based variant of Hwasong-11A with hypersonic glide vehicle, first displayed in 2025 during a military exhibition.
Hwasong-11S	《화성포-11ㅅ》형	KN-33	Submarine-launched ballistic missile	Hwasong-11S is a solid-fueled submarine-launched ballistic missile that is the underwater-launched variant of Hwasong-11A. First displayed and first tested both in October 2021, the missile's reported range is about 600 km (370 mi).
Hwasong-12	《화성-12》형 《화성포-12》형	KN-17	Intermediate-range ballistic missile	Hwasong-12 is a liquid-fueled, intermediate-range ballistic missile that have the first successful test in May 2017, with estimated range of 4,500 km (2,800 mi).
Hwasong-12A (Note: Presumed official designation.)	《화성-12가》형	Hypersonic Missile Type 2	Medium-range or intermediate-range ballistic missile	Hwasong-12A is presumed to be the official designation for a North Korean single-stage, liquid-fueled, hypersonic ballistic missile. Tested twice in January 2022, the estimated range of Hwasong-12A is over 2,000 km (1,200 mi).
Hwasong-12B	《화성-12나》형	Unknown	Intermediate-range ballistic missile	Hwasong-12B is a North Korean single-stage, liquid-fueled hypersonic, intermediate-range ballistic missile that was first displayed in July 2023. Its range is estimated to be over 6,000 km (3,700 mi).
Hwasong-13	《화성-13》형	KN-08 (2012 version); KN-14 (2015 version)	Intermediate-range or intercontinental ballistic missile	Hwasong-13 is the officially-called generic name to describe two liquid-fueled, road-mobile intercontinental ballistic missiles, called KN-08 and KN-14 by the United States. The two never-deployed missile variants have an estimated range of 8,000–10,000 km (5,000–6,200 mi).
Hwasong-14	《화성-14》형	KN-20	Intercontinental ballistic missile	Hwasong-14 is a liquid-fueled intercontinental ballistic missile that was tested twice in July 2017. The missile's estimated maximum range is more than 10,400 km (6,500 mi).
Hwasong-15	《화성-15》형 《화성포-15》형	KN-22	Intercontinental ballistic missile	Hwasong-15 is a liquid-fueled intercontinental ballistic missile that was first tested in November 2017. Its estimated maximum range is more than 13,000 km (8,100 mi). Hwasong-15 also has a modified version, which was tested in November 2022.
Hwasong-16A	《화성-16가》형	Unknown	Intermediate-range ballistic missile	Hwasong-16A is presumed to be the official designation for a solid-fueled hypersonic, intermediate-range ballistic missile, first tested in January 2024.
Hwasong-16B	《화성포-16나》형	Unknown	Intermediate-range ballistic missile	Hwasong-16B is a two-stage, solid-fueled, intermediate-range ballistic missile capable of carrying hypersonic glide vehicle, first tested in April 2024.
Hwasong-17	《화성포-17》형	KN-27	Intercontinental ballistic missile	Hwasong-17 is a two-stage, liquid-fueled intercontinental ballistic missile that was first displayed in October 2020 and first tested in March 2022. Its estimated range is 15,000 km (9,300 mi).
Hwasong-18	《화성포-18》형	Unknown	Intercontinental ballistic missile	Hwasong-18 is a three-stage, solid-fueled intercontinental ballistic missile that was first tested in April 2023, with an assumed range of 15,000 km (9,300 mi).
Hwasong-19	《화성포-19》형	Unknown	Intercontinental ballistic missile	Hwasong-19 is a three-stage, solid-fueled intercontinental ballistic missile that was first tested in October 2024. Its assumed range is at least 15,000 km (9,300 mi).
Hwasong-20	《화성포-20》형	Unknown	Intercontinental ballistic missile	Hwasong-20 is a "next-generation" ICBM, first revealed in September 2025.

== See also ==
- KN number
- Dongfeng (missile)
