= Rodong =

Rodong is a Korean-language word meaning "labor".

Rodong may also refer to:

- Rodong-1, a single stage, mobile liquid propellant ballistic missile developed by North Korea with a range of 900-1300km
- Rodong-2, a missile once claimed to have been developed by North Korea in the early 2000s
- Rodong-B (Hwasong-10)
- Rodong-C (KN-08)
- Rodong Sinmun, "Newspaper of the workers", a North Korean newspaper
- Rodong, the Malay common name of the edible telescope snail, Telescopium telescopium
