= Korean People's Army Strategic Force =

Branch of the Korean People's Army

- 조선인민군 전략군 朝鮮人民軍 戰略軍
- Founded: July 3, 1999; 27 years ago (official claim)
- Country: North Korea
- Allegiance: Kim Jong Un
- Type: Strategic missile force
- Role: Strategic deterrence
- Size: 50,000
- Part of: Korean People's Army
- Garrison/HQ: Sŏngch'ŏn-kun; South Pyongan, North Korea

Commanders
- Commander: Colonel General Kim Jong Gil

Insignia
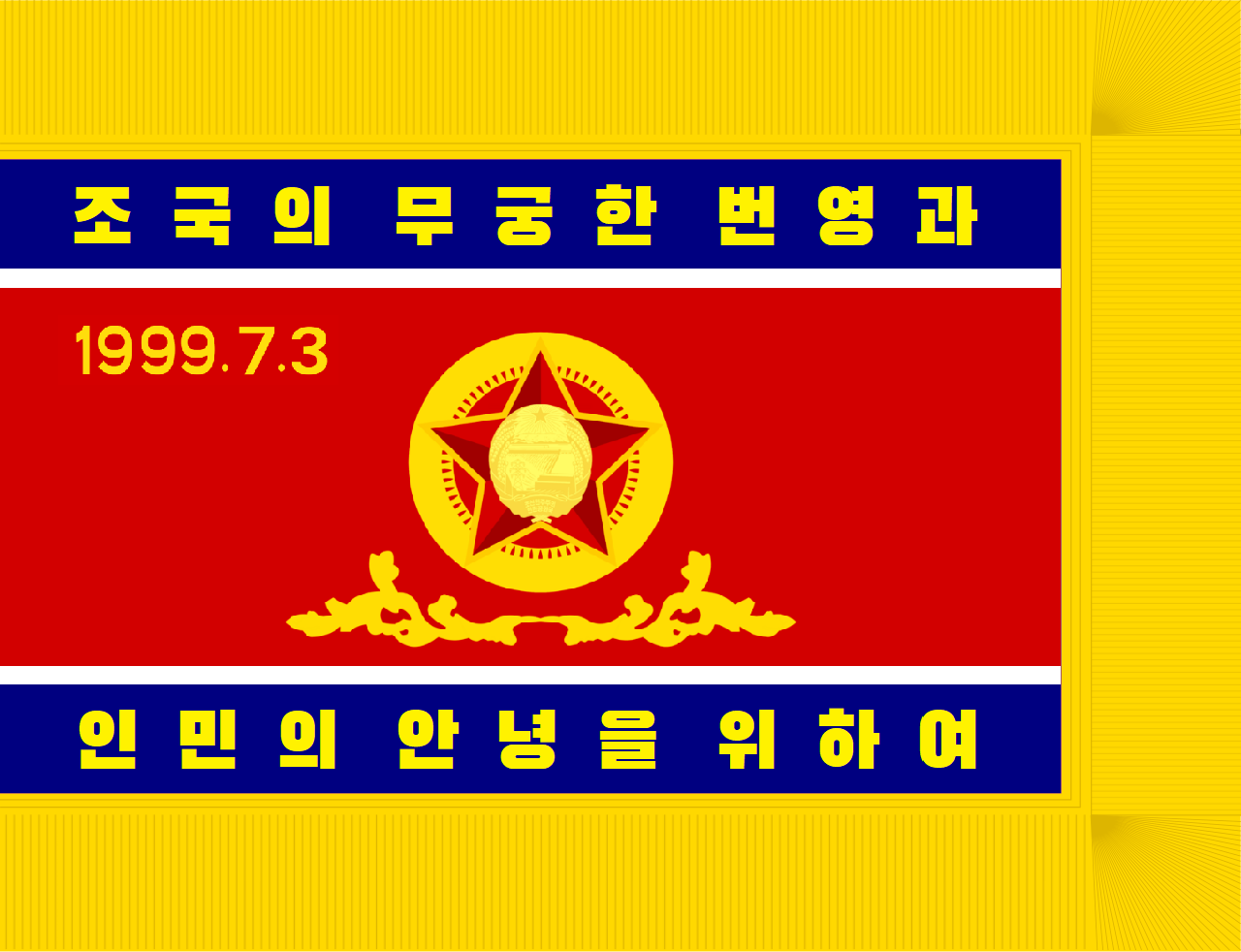
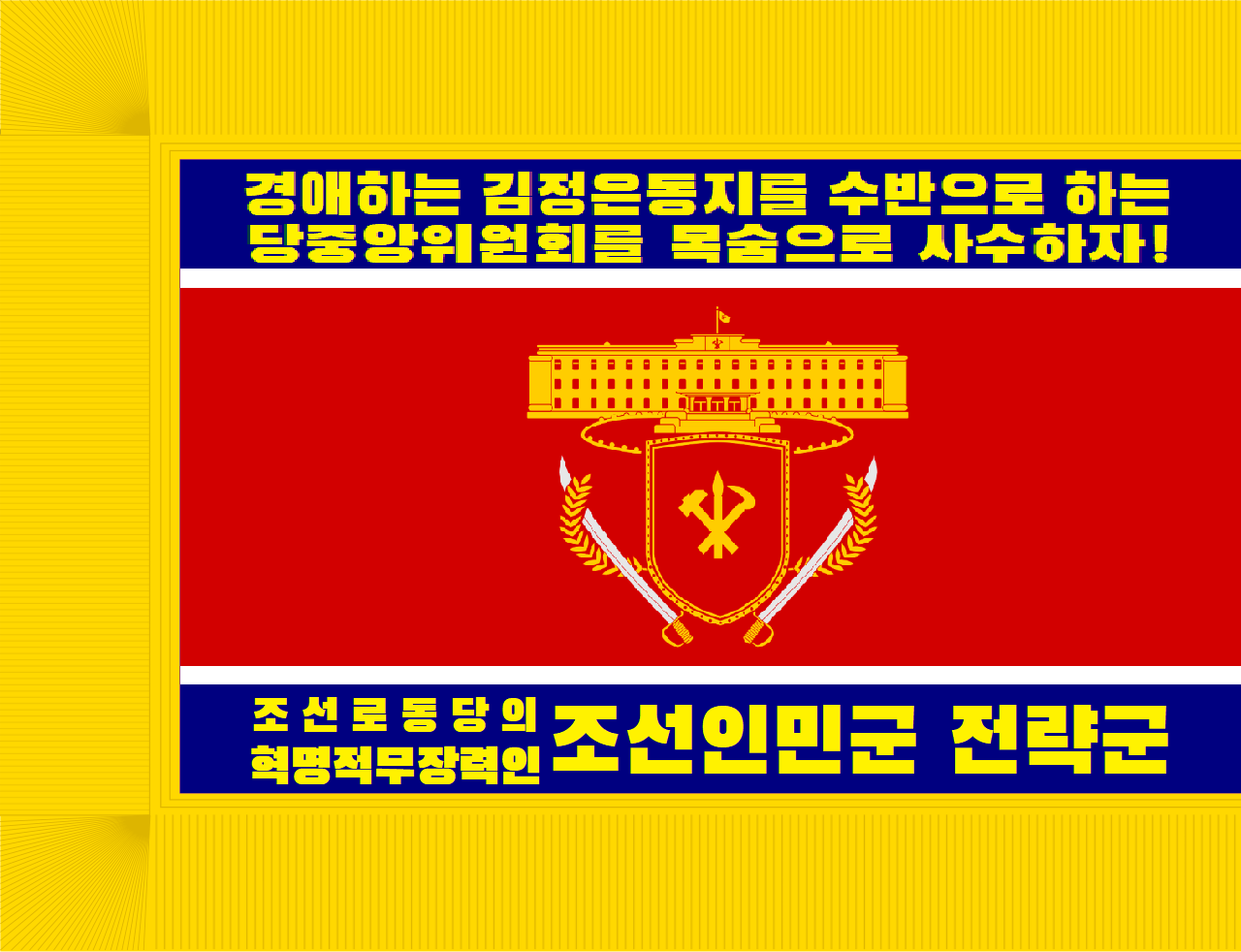
- Flag: Front: Back:

The Korean People's Army Strategic Force (Korean: 조선인민군 전략군; MR: chosŏninmin'gun chŏllyakkun), previously known as the Korean People's Army Strategic Rocket Force (조선인민군 전략로케트군), is a military branch of the Korean People's Army (KPA) founded in 2012 that operates surface-to-surface missiles in the nuclear and conventional strike roles. It is mainly armed with ballistic missiles. The inventory includes domestic and Soviet designs.

== History ==
North Korea received rocket artillery, surface-to-air missiles (SAMs), and anti-ship missiles from the Soviet Union in the 1960s and then from China in the 1970s. The decision to develop a domestic missile production capability was likely made by 1965 after the Soviet Union refused to supply ballistic missiles. Military and industrial preparations began shortly afterward. China agreed to assist North Korea develop ballistic missiles. A joint development program for the DF-61 missile began in 1977. It was cancelled in 1978 due to Chinese domestic politics.

In the late-1970s or early-1980s, North Korea received R-17 Elbrus (Scud-B) ballistic missiles from Egypt. The Hwasong-5 was based on reverse engineering the R-17. Flight-testing began in 1984. The Hwasong-5 was supplied to Iran in 1985. Its use in the War of the Cities provided considerable operational data. The missile had suffered a number of launch failures in North Korean testing and in Iranian service. A 1985 cooperative agreement may have provided North Korea with Iranian funds for missile development.

The Hwasong-5 entered serial production in 1987. Development continued by "scaling up Scud technology." North Korea received Soviet and then Russian assistance in the mid-1980s and early-1990s.

The Hwasong-7 (Nodong) began development in 1988 or 1989. In 1995, it began deploying, after one failed and one reduced-range flight test. Iran and Pakistan manufactured missiles based on the Hwasong-7. Flight data from the Pakistani Ghauri missile was provided to North Korea.

In the late-1990s, a rocket division was created within the Ministry of the People’s Armed Forces. Both said division and the KPAGF's rocket and ballistic missile units were organized into one force under the Missile Guidance Bureau in 1999, currently July 3 is marked as its service anniversary.

Since Kim Jong Un came to power in December 2011, North Korea has attempted to launch nearly three times as many ballistic missiles as during the entire reign of his father, Kim Jong Il. Between 2011 and the end of 2016, North Korea launched 42 ballistic missiles: 20 short-range Scud- type missiles with a range of 300–1,000 km, 10 medium-range Hwasong-7 (Nodong) missiles that can fly 1,300-1,500 km, eight intermediate-range Hwasong-10 (Musudan) missiles traditionally assessed to have a range of 3,500-4,000 km, and four submarine-launched ballistic missiles (SLBMs). These tests can be divided into three categories: tests of operational missiles, tests of missiles North Korea considered operational but were untested, such as the Musudan, and those still under development, such as the Pukguksong [Polaris] family of solid-fuelled missiles.

In 2012, the United Nations and independent experts said that North Korea did not operate missiles beyond the intermediate range, and that the long-range missiles shown at parades are mock-ups. There were doubts about the authenticity of the Hwasong-13 (KN-08) missiles displayed on 16-wheel carrier trucks during a 2012 military parade, and the Musudan missiles shown in 2010.

The testing in 2018 and 2019 of four new road-mobile, solid propellant propulsion, SRBMs marked a qualitative improvement in North Korean missiles. These have a reduced firing preparation signature, making destruction before launch more difficult. Some have a flattened trajectory, making in-flight interception more difficult. Japanese Defence Minister Takeshi Iwaya stated "I believe that [North Korea’s] development of a missile that flies at a lower altitude than a conventional ballistic missile in an irregular trajectory is aimed at breaking through the [Japanese] missile defence system".

These new missiles such as the Hwasong-11A (KN-23) and Hwasong-11B (KN-24) are more sophisticated than the previous Hwasong series. They employ flattened trajectories to remain below 50 km in altitude, putting them in between the 40 km maximum engagement altitude of Patriot missile-defense interceptors and 50 km minimum engagement altitude of THAAD and Aegis missile defense systems. Flying through this coverage gap and using active steering increases survivability against missile defenses. They have the advantage of being solid-fueled and more accurate than their predecessors, making them more effective weapons.

Between 2018 and 2020, North Korea expanded its missiles brigades, from 8 to 13.

== Organization ==
The Strategic Force is a branch of the KPA and is likely directly subordinate to the General Staff Department.

=== Facilities ===
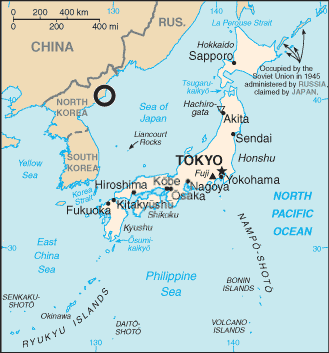
The location of the Musudan-ri launch facility

- Musudan-ri (무수단리) is a rocket launching site in North Korea at 40°51′N, 129°40′E. It lies in southern North Hamgyong Province, near the northern tip of East Korea Bay. The area was formerly known as Taep'o-dong (대포동), from which the Taepodong rockets take their name.
- Kittaeryŏng (깃대령) site is in Kangwon Province, which borders South Korea. It is used for launches of short to medium-range missiles and has a pad for mobile launchers.
- Kalgol-dong (갈골동) site is in Chagang Province and houses Hwasong-5/6 missiles, targeting South Korea.
- Panghyon Airport site is in North P'yongan Province and houses Rodong missiles. It targets U.S. forces in Japan.
- Okp’yŏng-dong (옥평동) site is in Kangwon Province and houses Hwasong and Rodong missiles.
- Pongdong-ri(봉동리) site is on North Korea's west coast, about 50 km south of the North Korean-Chinese border.
- Sakkanmol Missile Operating Base is a short-range ballistic missiles site in North Hwanghae Province. Geo-located at 38.584698°N 126.107945°E
- Chia-ri (지하리) north of Chorwon County, Kangwon Province, it is a missile support facility and operational launch base.
- Kumchon-ni (금천리) in Anbyon County, it is equipped with Hwasong-9 (Scud-ER) medium-range ballistic missiles (MRBM).
- Sing'ye (Shin'gye) (신계) across from Chia-ri, this is a small missile support facility and SCUD-C base. Construction began in 1985.
- Sil-li(신리) a missile support facility next to Pyongyang International Airport constructed between 2016 and 2020.
- Hodo Peninsula (호도반도) is a rocket and missile testing facility near Wonsan. It was established in the 1960s and was modernized in 2014–2016.
- Yusang-ni (유상리) Twenty-eight kilometers east of Sunchon, it is one of the newest operating bases built (c. 2003). It has been reported to house either the Hwasong-13, Hwasong-14, or Hwasong-15 missiles.
- Hoejung-ni(회정리) is North Korea's newest missile base, built c. 2012–13. It is likely capable of deploying intercontinental ballistic missiles as it lies in the country's missile "strategic belt".
- Riman-ri (Yongnim)(리만리) it is south of Chonchon County, Chagang Province and is the largest missile base by area.
- Sangnam-ri (상남리) in South Hamgyong Province, it is equipped with intermediate-range ballistic missiles.
- Sinpo-Mayang the site is a submarine base and SLBM development facility
- Sino-ri (신오리) the site houses a regiment-sized unit equipped with Nodong-1 medium-range ballistic missiles. Geo-located at 39.644929°N 125.355288°E
- Taegwan(대관) is the home of a missile base and a nearby missile manufacturing facility.
- Yeongjeo-dong(영저동) the site is near the Chinese border in Ryanggang Province.
- Magun'po(마군포) is a solid rocket motor test facility.
- Chamjin-ni(잠진리) is North Korea's oldest known vertical engine test stand.

There are other numerous smaller sites, scattered around the country, serving for mobile launcher pads. Some larger sites are under construction.

=== Launch capabilities ===
Silo-based launch
South Korean government sources are reported to have stated in 2013 that a missile silo complex is located south of Paektu Mountain near the Chinese border. The silos are reportedly designed for mid- to long-range missiles, but it is not clear if all of them are operational; however, these claims have not been independently verified.

In March 2023, North Korea apparently demonstrated silo-based launch capability for the first time.
Launch pads
Launching pads are required for the more sophisticated Taepodong-1/2, as their liquid propellant is difficult to store and the missiles must be fueled immediately before launch. This launching method poses a great risk, as the sites themselves are extremely vulnerable to airstrikes. Launching pads can be used to test different types of SRBM, IRBM and ICBMs, and to launch space satellites, but they are of little value if any of these missiles is to be deployed as a strategic weapon.

Mobile launcher vehicles
North Korea extensively uses mobile launchers for its missiles, including the Rodong-1 and the Hwasong-10. These are hard to detect and significantly improve survivability.

Submarine/ship-based launch
The Korean People's Navy is not known to have ballistic missile submarines in service. However, it has started research and development into a capability to launch ballistic missiles from submarines and has successfully fired a missile from one of its test submarines.

== Active missiles ==
Detailed listings of the equipment holdings of the Korean People's Army are rather scarce in unclassified literature. North Korea operates the FROG-7, Hwasong-5 (Locally built Scud-B), Hwasong-6 (Locally built Scud-C), Hwasong-7 (mislabeled as Rodong-1) and Hwasong-9 (a.k.a. Scud-ER). The U.S. National Air and Space Intelligence Center reported in 2009 that the Rocket Forces had fewer than 100 launchers for Tochka and Hwasong-5/6 SRBMs, and fewer than 50 launchers for the Hwasong-7. Academic research in 2015 suggested North Korea had about 1,000 ballistic missiles: 600 Hwasong-series; 100 KN-02s; and 300 Hwasong-7s.

As of 2016, South Korea's military has identified three belts of North Korean missiles. The first are located about 50–90 km north of the Korean Demilitarized Zone (DMZ). This belt reportedly has 500-600 Scud missiles that have ranges of 300–700 km. It said the North has some 40 transporter erector launchers (TELs) in this belt, which makes the missiles harder to detect.

In the second belt, lying 90–120 km north of the DMZ, Pyongyang is known to have placed 200-300 Hwasong-7 (also called Rodong or Nodong) medium-range missiles with a range of around 1,300 km, with 30 TELs. In the third belt, lying deeper inside the country, the North may have 30-50 Musudan (Hwasong-10) intermediate-range ballistic missiles (IRBMs) and 30 TELs, with the latest reports indicating the deployment of the North's Hwasong-13 (KN-08) long-range missiles.

As of 2017, North Korea is thought to possess about 900 short-range ballistic missiles (SRBMs).

Earlier Hwasong-13/-13 mod designs untested and presumed cancelled.

Rather speculative estimates are given in the following table:

| Missile | Origin | Range | Quantity | Comments |
Intercontinental ballistic missiles (ICBM)
| Hwasong-14 | North Korea | 10,000+ km | 6+ (Hwasong-14/-15/-15 mod 1/-18) | Successfully tested in July 2017. |
| Hwasong-15 | North Korea | 13,000 km | 6+ (Hwasong-14/-15/-15 mod 1/-18) | Successfully tested in November 2017. |
| Hwasong-15 mod 1 | North Korea | | 6+ (Hwasong-14/-15/-15 mod 1/-18) | |
| Hwasong-17 mod 1 | North Korea | >13,000 km | 11+ | Successfully tested in March 2022. |
| Hwasong-18 | North Korea | 15,000 km | 6+ (Hwasong-14/-15/-15 mod 1/-18) | Successfully tested in April 2023. First solid-fuel ICBM in North Korean missile arsenal. |
| Hwasong-19 | North Korea | At least 15,000 km | 6+ (Hwasong-14/-15/-15 mod 1/-18) | Successfully tested in October 2024. |
Intermediate-range ballistic missiles (IRBM)
| Hwasong-8 Hwasong-8 mod 1 | North Korea | | 1+ launchers | In testing |
| Hwasong-12 | North Korea | 5,000–6,000 km | 10+ | |
| Hwasong-12 mod 1 | North Korea | 5,000–6,000 km | 10+ | |
| Hwasong-16B | North Korea | 3,000–5,500 km | | Successfully tested in April 2024 and January 2025. A solid-fuel IRBM in North Korean missile arsenal. |
Medium-range ballistic missiles (MRBM)
| Hwasong-7 | North Korea | 900–1,500 km | 10+ | |
| Pukguksong-2 | North Korea | 1,200–3,000 km | 7+ | Operational and deployed to northern border in missile bases where Hwasong-7 is deployed. |
| Hwasong-9 (Scud-ER) | North Korea | 1,000 km | Some | Recently upgraded with new guidance and electronics. |
Short-range ballistic missiles (SRBM)
| Hwasong-5 (Scud-B) | North Korea | 340 km | 30+ (Hwasong-5/-6) | |
| Hwasong-6 (Scud-C) | North Korea | 500 km | 30+ (Hwasong-5/-6) | |
| Hwasong-11A (KN-23) | North Korea | 240–800 km | 17+ launchers | Similar to 9K720 Iskander or Hyunmoo-2. In 2019, tests of the missile were conducted in May, July and August. First launched from a railcar, September 2021. |
| Hwasong-11B (KN-24) | North Korea | 410 km | 9+ launchers | Some similarities to MGM-140 ATACMS, but larger, with aft-fins to maintain aerodynamic control over entire flight. Tested in August 2019 and March 2020. |
| Hwasong-11C (KN-23 mod 1) | North Korea | About 600–900 km | 6+ launchers | In testing. |
| Hwasong-11D | North Korea | About 100–300 km | 250 launchers | |
| Hwasong-11S | North Korea | About 600 km | "Some" launchers | In testing. |
| KN-18 | North Korea | 450+ km | | Scud-C variant that carries a Maneuverable reentry vehicle. Tested May 2017. |
| KN-21 | North Korea | 250+ km | | Scud-B/Hwasong-5 variant with maneuvering capabilities. Tested April 2017. |
| KN-25 (600mm multiple rocket launcher) | North Korea | 380 km | | "Super-large multiple rocket launcher," viewed as an SRBM by U.S. assessment. 30 tracked chassis and another 9 truck chassis are known to have been made for total of 216 guided rockets. |
Cruise missiles
| Hwasal-1 | North Korea | | "Some" launchers | In testing. |
| Hwasal-1 Ra-3 | North Korea | | "Some" launchers | In testing. |
| Hwasal-2 | North Korea | 1,800–2,000 km | "Some" launchers | In testing. |

The estimated maximum range of some North Korean missile types. The missiles with a range exceeding that of the Rodong are not known to be operationally deployed.

=== Warheads ===
North Korean missiles can serve to deliver various types of warheads, including WMD. It is possible that up to three Rodong-1 missiles are fitted with nuclear warheads. In a similar manner to the initial Chinese nuclear doctrine, nuclear weapons are being stored separately, and would only be mounted on missiles after an order of the supreme commander (Kim Jong Un). Despite the claims by numerous media that North Korea has not yet created nuclear warheads small enough to be fit in a missile, reports surfaced in April 2009, according to which North Korea has miniaturized warheads, capable of being mounted on its missiles. The most suitable nuclear weapons delivery system is the Rodong-1, which has been successfully tested many times.

North Korea possesses a large chemical weapons stockpile, including powerful agents such as tabun, sarin, soman, VX gas and others. Little is known about the biological weapons stockpiles. They are probably limited, as North Koreans consider them much more dangerous to handle, therefore posing a threat to their own soldiers.

North Korea has yet to demonstrate the ability to produce a re-entry vehicle, without which North Korea cannot deliver a weapon accurately from an ICBM. However, a crude and highly-inaccurate blunt body reentry vehicle could be used in early missiles.

North Korea has been upgrading warheads for their aging Scud-derived ballistic missiles. These upgrades include the maneuverable reentry vehicle capability, in order to increase accuracy and evasion of ballistic missile defence systems such as THAAD. These maneuverable variants are called KN-18 and KN-21, both first tested in 2017.

== Exports ==
Several countries, including Egypt, Vietnam, Iran, Libya, Pakistan, Palestine, Qatar, Syria, the United Arab Emirates (UAE) and Yemen, have bought North Korean ballistic missiles or components, or received assistance from North Korea to establish local missile production.

North Korea also exported numerous type of rockets to Russia. Debris analysis shows North Korean made missile being used to attack Ukraine from late 2023, providing North Korea with an opportunity to test missiles and expanding its nuclear and ballistic missile programs, weapon transfer also violate sanctions imposed on Pyongyang.

== See also ==
- North Korea and weapons of mass destruction
- North Korean missile tests
- List of states with nuclear weapons
