= Hwasong-13 =

- Korean name
- Chosŏn'gŭl: 《화성-13》형
- Hancha: 火星 13型
- Literal meaning: Mars Type 13
- Revised Romanization: Hwaseong-13 hyeong
- McCune–Reischauer: Hwasŏng-13 hyŏng

The Hwasong-13 (Korean: 《화성-13》형; lit. 'Mars Type 13') was an experimental North Korean road-mobile intercontinental ballistic missile (ICBM) project. Hwasong-13 had two variants, called KN-08 and KN-14 under the US nomenclature, first displayed at military parades in 2012 and 2015, respectively. However, both missile variants appeared during these parades were assessed as propaganda-purposed mock-ups or unreliable prototype missiles. It was believed to be under development from 2012 before its cancellation in 2017. North Korea had never confirmed any flight tests of either Hwasong-13 variants; however, there were two alleged tests in October 2016, but it might also involve other types of long-range missile.

== 2012 version ==
Hwasong-13 (KN-08)
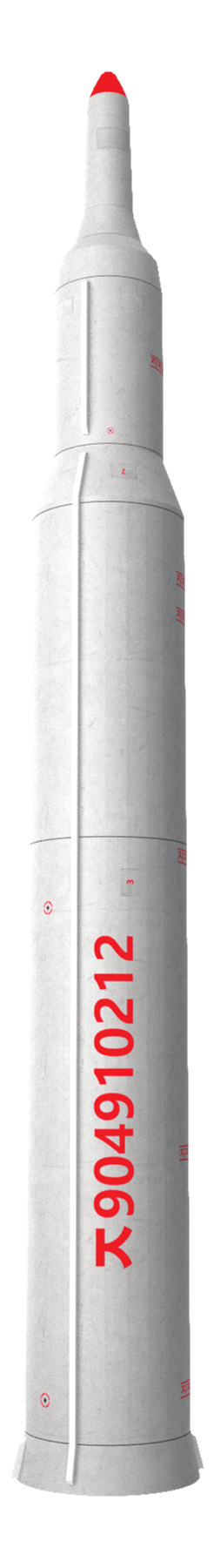
- Artist rendition of the missile's KN-08 version
- Type: Ballistic missile, TEL-mounted Mobile IRBM/ICBM
- Place of origin: North Korea

Service history
- Used by: Korean People's Army Strategic Force (cancelled)

Production history
- Manufacturer: North Korea (out of production)
- Produced: 2012 (first seen in parade); 2016 (first alleged failed tests, on 15 October 2016 and 20 October 2016)

Specifications
- Length: 17.1 m (56 ft) (estimated)
- Diameter: 1.9 m (6.2 ft) (estimated)
- Warhead: nuclear
- Propellant: Liquid
- Operational range: 5,500–10,000 km (3,400–6,200 mi)
- Launch platform: MAZ-based vehicle

The first version of Hwasong-13, called KN-08 under the U.S. naming convention and also known as Nodong-C (노동-C) was first displayed during a military parade in April 2012 to mark the 100th birth anniversary of Kim Il Sung. It is a liquid-fueled missile, with an estimated range of 5,500–10,000 km (3,400–6,200 mi).

=== Design and development ===
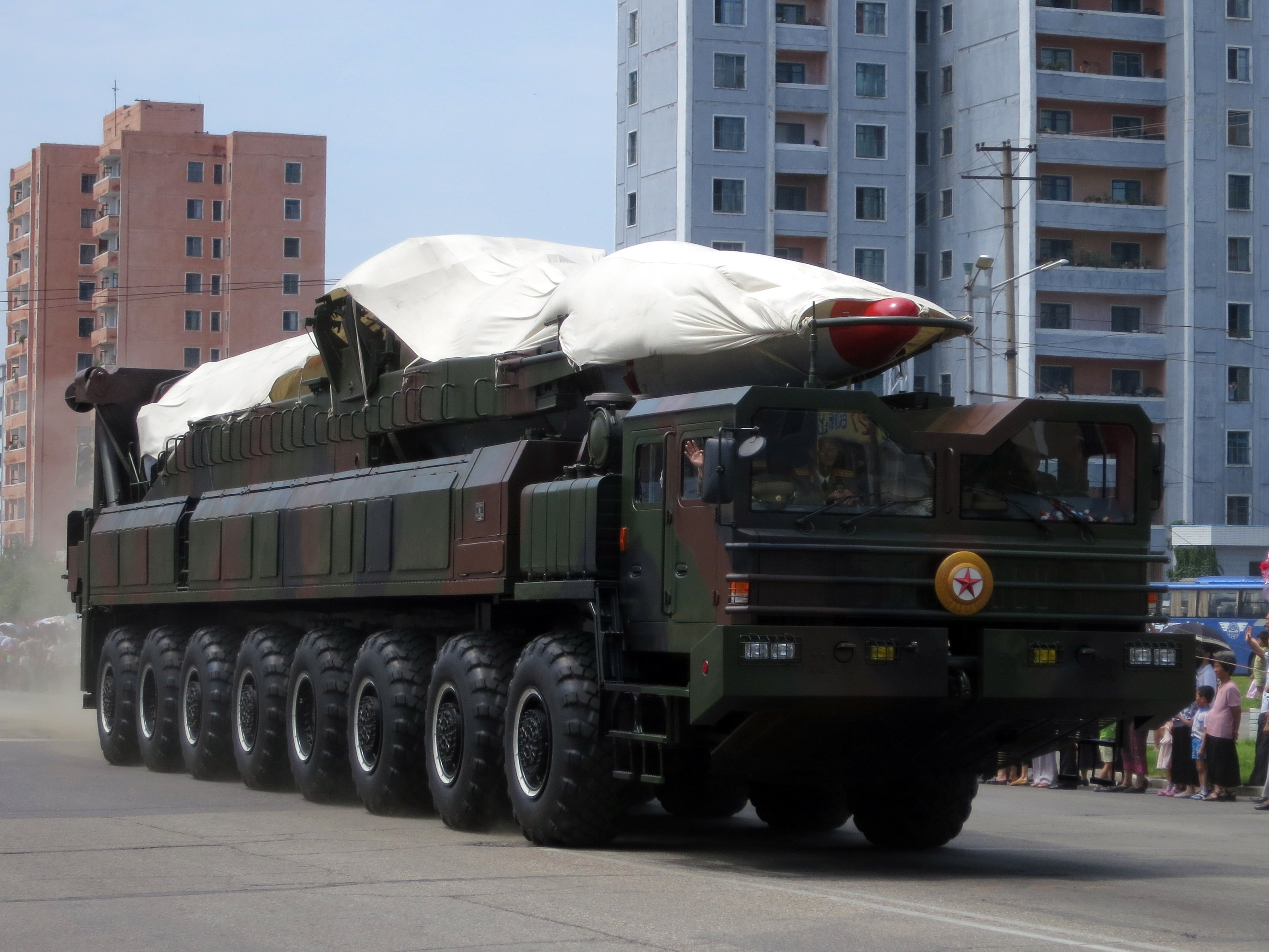
Hwasong-13 (KN-08 version) at Victory Day parade 2013

In late 2011, North Korea was reported to develop a long-range missile capable of hitting the US.

KN-08 was first displayed in April 2012, during a military parade. Six missiles were carried on 16-wheel transporter erector launchers (TELs), similar in size to those used by the Russian RT-2PM2 Topol-M missiles. The TELs are thought to be based on WS-51200 frames made by Wanshan Special Vehicle in China, possibly using technology from Minsk Automobile Plant. UN investigators have concluded that the TELs were Chinese WS51200 trucks exported to North Korea for lumber transport. The North Koreans converted them into TELs by installing hydraulic gear and controls to erect a missile. Despite being converted to fire a missile, the truck would not be likely to survive damage from the rocket exhaust like a purpose-built TEL, making it a single-use launcher.

Mock-ups of KN-08 were again displayed during a military parade in July 2013, with fewer discrepancies among them compared to the previous year. According to 38 North, the Hwasong-13 (KN-08)'s dimensions are estimated to be about 17.1 m (56 ft) long, with the first and second stage diameter of about 1.9 m (6.2 ft), reducing to about 1.25 m (4.1 ft) for the third stage. Liquid-fueled ICBMs generally only have two stages for best performance, with a few exceptions (usually when an existing design is upgraded). Its three-stage design is puzzling.

In early 2015, the U.S. Department of Defense announced that although they had not seen the Hwasong-13 tested, they believed North Korea had the ability to put a nuclear weapon on a Hwasong-13, and it was prudent to plan for that threat. Theoretically, it poses a threat to the U.S. mainland, able to deliver a 500–700 kg (1,100–1,500 lb) payload 7,500–9,000 km (4,700–5,600 mi) to the American west coast. Practically speaking however, its accuracy is likely "barely adequate" to target large cities, mobility would be limited to paved roads, and the system will require one to two hours of pre-launch fueling. In 2017, speculations were published that the KN-08 may achieve an "emergency operational status" by 2020.

On 15 March 2016, North Korean state media published image of a test of the KN-08's reentry vehicle nosecone. The test was guided by Kim Jong Un.

=== Engine tests and reported deployment ===
During 2013, North Korea was reported to test KN-08 engine two times: one in 11 February, and another on 25 December. Both tests were conducted in Tongchang-ri.

In 2014, North Korea conducted at least three further KN-08 engine tests: one in late March or early April, another in June and the third engine test in mid-August. It is also possible that North Korea conducted more than one KN-08 engine test between 22 March and 5 April 2014.

In February 2016, North Korea was reported to establish a military unit to operate KN-08.

== 2015 version ==
Hwasong-13 (KN-14)
- KN-14 during the 10 October 2015 military parade
- Type: Ballistic missile, TEL-mounted Mobile IRBM/ICBM
- Place of origin: North Korea

Service history
- Used by: Korean People's Army Strategic Force (cancelled)

Production history
- Manufacturer: North Korea (out of production)
- Produced: 2015 (first seen in parade)

Specifications
- Length: 16 m (52 ft) (estimated)
- Diameter: 2 m (6.6 ft) (estimated)
- Warhead: nuclear or conventional warhead, 300–700 kg (660–1,540 lb)
- Propellant: Liquid propellant
- Operational range: 8,000–12,000 km (5,000–7,500 mi)
- Launch platform: MAZ-based vehicle

The second version of Hwasong-13, called KN-14 under the U.S. naming convention, was first displayed in October 2015.

=== Design and development ===
The mock-up displayed by North Korea in October 2015 indicated that KN-14 had a close external resemblance to the later Hwasong-15. It was significantly different compared to previous models, with two stages rather than three. The overall size was somewhat reduced to 16 m (52 ft), while the missile's diameter also increased to 2 m (6.6 ft) because of larger fuel tanks for the two stages. It was no longer built with extensive riveting, suggesting a more modern structural design, with reduced weight. The missile also featured a modified smaller-in-length but larger-in-diameter third stage plus re-entry vehicle section design, as well as more accuracy compared with earlier KN-08.

Being a longer-range version of KN-08, its range is assessed to be 8,000–10,000 km (5,000–6,200 mi) with a payload of 300–700 kg (660–1,540 lb), although there was a high-end range estimation of 12,000 km (7,500 mi). Theoretically, it could also deliver North Korean nuclear warheads to the US capital Washington.

On 31 March 2016, The Washington Free Beacon reported that the missile displayed in 2015 was a new missile—called KN-08 Mod 2, or KN-14 by United States—rather than a KN-08. The report quickly circulated in Japanese, Chinese, Taiwanese and South Korean media.

Originally called Hwasong-14 by Western sources, however, analysts believed that the missile was inaccurately designated, as the real Hwasong-14 was first test-fired on 4 July 2017, which appears to have no substantial relationship with the 2015 version of Hwasong-13. It is now called by United States as KN-14.

=== Reactions from Chinese military expert ===
On 1 April 2016, China Central Television aired a 9-minute-long interview with a Chinese military expert on CCTV-4 discussing the 2015 version of Hwasong-13 (KN-14) and North Korea's potential future developments in ICBM technology. The Chinese expert estimated that North Korea could have a true ICBM within range of the US mainland between 2021 and 2026 if they can successfully master their Hwasong-10 missile. He stated that the technology and theory behind an Intermediate-range ballistic missile is exactly the same as an ICBM, except that an ICBM involves more stage separation in order for the missile to have a longer range. North Korea has successfully demonstrated their stage separation technology in two satellite launches: the Kwangmyŏngsŏng-3 Unit 2 in 2012, and Kwangmyŏngsŏng-4 in 2016. However, the expert noted two weakness of North Korea's missile development program. One is that the North Korean missiles are based on older missile designs. Since North Korea has conducted only minimal flight tests (compared to other countries with active missile development programs), flaws in these older designs have continued into new missile development. The other aspect is that all of North Korea's ballistic missiles except the Hwasong-11 (KN-02, at the time of the interview) were liquid fueled, and therefore the preparation, fueling, and launch takes hours. This amount of time would give enemies—such as the United States or South Korea—time to conduct airstrikes and destroy the missiles before they could be launched. North Korea may also be studying Soviet encapsulation techniques such as those used in the Soviet's UR-100 ICBM, where each missile comes pre-fueled in a maintenance-free capsule with a mean time between overhauls of several years and a preparation time before launch reduced to minutes. This appears to have been proven with the successful test launches of the Pukguksong-2 solid-fueled ballistic missile, in both land (Pukguksong-2) and submarine launched (Pukguksong-1) variants in 2017.

== Project cancellation ==
In an interview for Difesa Online, a military-focused website, on 27 November 2017, German analyst Norbert Brügge claimed that Hwasong-13, along with Hwasong-10, was likely cancelled due to unresolved engine problems. Several days later, on 2 December 2017, it was reported that the Hwasong-13 project was discontinued because of the engine's fuel injection time and output issues. The Hwasong-13 development team was sent to assist development of the Hwasong-12, Hwasong-14 and Hwasong-15 missiles. It is not known whether Hwasong-13 variants entered service prior to its cancellation.

Despite the uncertain functionality, both Hwasong-13 variants appear to contribute to the developments of Hwasong-14 and Hwasong-15, both had their first successful test in 2017.

== List of Hwasong-13 tests ==
Until its cancellation, North Korean state media had not confirmed any test flight of Hwasong-13.

There were two failed missile tests occurred in October 2016. The first one was detected at Kusong on 15 October 2016, at 12:03 pm local time. The second one took place on 20 October 2016 at 7:00 am local time. These launches were assessed to involve Hwasong-10.

According to The Washington Post, based on the burn scars in satellite imagery, which is bigger than any Hwasong-10 tests, the missile used for the test could be the KN-08 variant of Hwasong-13. The launches might also involve KN-14 variant, Hwasong-12, or Pukguksong-2. It is difficult to exactly confirm the missile used in these tests, as North Korea did not release images about October 2016 launches.

== See also ==
- Pukguksong-1
- Hwasong-10 (Musudan)
