= KN number =

Designation of North Korean missiles

The KN number (Korean: KN 코드; lit. 'KN code') is the designation used by the United States for describing North Korean missiles.

== Description ==
The "KN" stands for "Korea, North", which is the reverse form of "North Korea". It is used by United States military for designating North Korean missiles.

The number following "KN" represents the order of the missile learned about by South Korea and the United States. For example, "KN-24" is the 24th North Korean missile recognized by South Korea and the U.S. militaries.

== List of KN numbers ==
=== Official numbers ===
KN number	Official designation	Classfication	Description
KN-01	Kumsong-1	Anti-ship missile	KN-01 is the extended-range version of Soviet Union's P-15 Termit and China's Silkworm. Another source give the "KN-01" designation to the ship-launched version of the Russian Kh-35's North Korean variant.
KN-02	Hwasong-11	Short-range ballistic missile	KN-02, also called Toksa (Viper), is the U.S. designation of Hwasong-11, a OTR-21 Tochka-based short-range ballistic missile (SRBM), with a maximum range of 120–170 km (75–106 mi).
KN-03	Hwasong-5	Short-range ballistic missile	KN-03 is either the U.S. designation of the Hwasong-5 short-range ballistic missile or a variant of the Hwasong-7 (Nodong) medium-range ballistic missile.
KN-03	Unknown	Medium-range ballistic missile	KN-03 is either the U.S. designation of the Hwasong-5 short-range ballistic missile or a variant of the Hwasong-7 (Nodong) medium-range ballistic missile.
KN-04	Hwasong-6	Short-range ballistic missile	KN-04 is either the U.S. designation of Hwasong-9 (Scud-ER), a medium-range ballistic missile or the Hwasong-6, a short-range ballistic missile.
KN-04	Hwasong-9	Medium-range ballistic missile	KN-04 is either the U.S. designation of Hwasong-9 (Scud-ER), a medium-range ballistic missile or the Hwasong-6, a short-range ballistic missile.
KN-05	Hwasong-7	Medium-range ballistic missile	KN-05 is either the U.S. designation of the Hwasong-7 (Nodong) medium-range ballistic missile or a North Korean variant of Russian's Kh-35 anti-ship cruise missile.
KN-05	Unknown	Anti-ship cruise missile	KN-05 is either the U.S. designation of the Hwasong-7 (Nodong) medium-range ballistic missile or a North Korean variant of Russian's Kh-35 anti-ship cruise missile.
KN-06	Pongae-5	Surface-to-air missile	KN-06 is the U.S. designation of Pongae-5, a surface-to-air missile. After a test on 28 May 2017, Pongae-5 became operational.
KN-07	Hwasong-10	Intermediate-range ballistic missile	According to the sources, KN-07 is either the U.S. designation of a North Korean land-attack variant of the Chinese anti-ship cruise missile HY-2 or the Hwasong-10 intermediate-range ballistic missile (also externally known as Musudan).
KN-07	Unknown	Cruise missile	According to the sources, KN-07 is either the U.S. designation of a North Korean land-attack variant of the Chinese anti-ship cruise missile HY-2 or the Hwasong-10 intermediate-range ballistic missile (also externally known as Musudan).
KN-08	Hwasong-13	Intermediate-range or intercontinental ballistic missile	KN-08 is the U.S. designation of the initial three-stage design of the never-deployed and never-tested Hwasong-13, an intermediate-range or intercontinental ballistic missile that first displayed in April 2012.
KN-09	Unknown	Multiple rocket launcher	KN-09, also known as KN-SS-X-9, is the U.S. designation of 300mm-diameter multiple rocket launcher.
KN-10	Unknown	Short-range ballistic missile	According to South Korean intelligence, a development of the OTR-21 with a range of 220 km (140 mi).
KN-11	Pukguksong-1	Submarine-launched ballistic missile	KN-11 is the external name of Pukguksong-1, a two-stage, submarine-launched ballistic missile (SLBM) that was successfully flight tested in August 2016. Its maximum range is about 1,200 km (750 mi).
KN-12	Unknown	Multiple rocket launcher	KN-12 is the external designation of a 122 mm multiple rocket launch system.
KN-13	Unknown	Surface-to-air missile	KN-13 is the U.S. designation for a North Korean surface-to-air missile.
KN-14	Hwasong-13	Intermediate-range or intercontinental ballistic missile	KN-14 is the U.S. designation of the two-stage version of the never-deployed and never-tested Hwasong-13, an intermediate-range or intercontinental ballistic missile. It was first displayed in October 2015. Previously, the missile was misidentified as Hwasong-14.
KN-15	Pukguksong-2	Medium-range ballistic missile	KN-15 is the U.S. designation of Pukguksong-2, a solid-fueled medium-range ballistic missile that was first tested in February 2017. It is the land-based version of Pukguksong-1.
KN-16	Unknown	Multiple rocket launcher	KN-16 is the external designation of a 240-mm multiple rocket launch system.
KN-17	Hwasong-12	Intermediate-range ballistic missile	KN-17 is the U.S. designation of Hwasong-12, a liquid-fueled intermediate-range ballistic missile that have the first successful test in May 2017.
KN-18	Unknown	Short-range ballistic missile	KN-18 is the U.S. designation of a variant of the Hwasong-6 (Scud-C) with maneuverable reentry vehicle, first tested in May 2017. Other sources give this designation to Hwasong-5 (Scud-B)'s similar variant.
KN-19	Kumsong-3	Anti-ship missile	KN-19 is the U.S. designation of Kumsong-3, an anti-ship missile first tested in June 2017.
KN-20	Hwasong-14	Intercontinental ballistic missile	KN-20 is the U.S. designation of Hwasong-14, an intercontinental ballistic missile that was tested twice in July 2017.
KN-21	Unknown	Short-range ballistic missile	KN-21 is the U.S. designation of a variant of the Hwasong-5 with terminal maneuverability, first tested in August 2017. This designation is also given to Hwasong-6's similar variant.
KN-22	Hwasong-15	Intercontinental ballistic missile	KN-22 is the U.S. designation of Hwasong-15, an intercontinental ballistic missile that was first tested in November 2017.
KN-23	Hwasong-11A	Short-range ballistic missile	KN-23 is the U.S. designation of a short-range ballistic missile that was first tested in May 2019. It is similar to Russia's Iskander. In July 2023, four years after the first test, North Korea officially revealed the missile's official name.
KN-24	Hwasong-11B	Short-range ballistic missile	KN-24 is the U.S. designation of a short-range ballistic missile that was first tested in August 2019. It is similar to United States's ATACMS. In October 2021, during a military exhibition, North Korea revealed the missile's official name.
KN-25	Super-large multiple rocket launcher 600 mm multiple rocket launcher	Multiple rocket launcher or short-range ballistic missile	KN-25 is the U.S. designation of the officially-called 600 mm multiple rocket launcher (or Super-large multiple rocket launcher). Due to its large size and range compared to other MRLs, United States Forces Korea classified it as a short-range ballistic missile.
KN-26	Pukguksong-3	Submarine-launched ballistic missile	KN-26 is the external name of Pukguksong-3, a submarine-launched ballistic missile (SLBM) that was first tested in October 2019.
KN-27	Hwasong-17	Intercontinental ballistic missile	KN-27 and KN-28 are the U.S. designations of Hwasong-17, an intercontinental ballistic missile that was first displayed in October 2020.
KN-28	Hwasong-17	Intercontinental ballistic missile	KN-27 and KN-28 are the U.S. designations of Hwasong-17, an intercontinental ballistic missile that was first displayed in October 2020.
KN-30	Hwasong-11C	Short-range ballistic missile	KN-30 is the U.S. designation of Hwasong-11C, a short-range ballistic missile that is the larger version of Hwasong-11A.
KN-33	Hwasong-11S	Submarine-launched ballistic missile	KN-33 is the reported U.S. designation of Hwasong-11S, a "mini" submarine-launched ballistic missile that is the navalized version of Hwasong-11A.
KN-35	Hwasong-11D	Tactical ballistic missile	KN-35 is the reported U.S. designation of Hwasong-11D, a short-range ballistic missile that is the smaller version of Hwasong-11A.

=== Former numbers ===
KN number	Official designation	Classfication	Description
KN-23A	Hwasong-11C	Short-range ballistic missile	KN-23A and KN-23B are the former U.S. designations of Hwasong-11C, which is reportedly assigned "KN-30" designation.
KN-23B	Hwasong-11C	Short-range ballistic missile	KN-23A and KN-23B are the former U.S. designations of Hwasong-11C, which is reportedly assigned "KN-30" designation.

== See also ==
- Hwasong (missile family)
- NATO reporting name
