= Pukguksong-2 =

North Korean medium-range ballistic missile

- Type: Medium-range or intermediate-range ballistic missile
- Place of origin: North Korea

Service history
- In service: 2017–present
- Used by: Korean People's Army Strategic Force

Production history
- Manufacturer: North Korea
- Produced: 2016

Specifications
- Length: 9.3 m (31 ft)
- Diameter: 1.5 m (4.9 ft)
- Warhead: nuclear, conventional
- Engine: Solid-fueled engine
- Operational range: 1,200–3,000 km (750–1,860 mi) (estimated)
- Guidance system: Inertial navigation system
- Launch platform: Tracked TEL

- Pukguksong-2
- Chosŏn'gŭl: 《북극성-2》형
- Hancha: 北極星二形
- Revised Romanization: Bukgeukseong-i hyeong
- McCune–Reischauer: Pukkŭksŏng-i hyŏng

The Pukguksong-2 (Note: Also known as KN-15 under the U.S. naming convention.) (Korean: 《북극성-2》형; lit. 'Polaris Type 2') is a North Korean medium-range or intermediate-range ballistic missile that had the first successful test flight on 12 February 2017.

== Description ==
Images of the Pukguksong-2
- Tracked TEL
- Launch of the missile

The Pukguksong-2 is an enlarged, two-stage, extended-range development of the Pukguksong-1, a submarine-launched ballistic missile (SLBM). It uses a solid fuel engine, allowing them to verify a "feature of evading interception". Based from images, the missile is judged to be 9.3 m (31 ft) long and 1.5 m (4 ft 11 in) wide. The missile is canister-launched from its enclosed transport container. It uses a 'cold-launching' system, which starts using compressed gas, followed by the engine igniting in mid-flight. The container is a smooth cylinder inside, without rails, and on launch a series of slipper blocks could be seen to fall away from the missile. These act as bearings while the missile is projected through the close-fitting tube, a system first seen with the US Peacekeeper. A series of grid fins are deployed at the base of the missile to provide aerodynamic stability during flight. The transporter erector launcher (TEL) is a new design, conceptually similar to the Russian 2P19 TEL of the R-17M Elbrus SS-1 Scud-B; fully tracked and claimed to be of indigenous North Korean manufacture, rather than previous Chinese wheeled launchers, derivatives of the ubiquitous MAZ-543 design.

Pukguksong-2 is equipped with an inertial navigation system (INS) and mid-course guidance, allowing the missile to follow a pre-programmed trajectory to the target. As the missile is described as 'nuclear-capable', it can deliver both nuclear and conventional warheads.

Analysts have described Pukguksong-2 as 'more stable, more efficient, and harder to detect' than North Korea's earlier designs. The missile is a solid-fuel rocket and may be launched in minutes. Previous designs are liquid fuelled are more vulnerable to counterattack as their launch preparations take hours.

On its first test flight it flew 500 km (310 miles) on a deliberately inefficient trajectory. Its operational range is typically estimated at between 1,200–3,000 km (750–1,860 miles) and is probably intended to replace medium-range missiles like the Hwasong-7 (Rodong-1) and Hwasong-9 (Scud-ER), potentially by the early 2020s depending on rate of manufacture. One unusual feature is the ability of the missile to take images of the ground from near its apogee and transmit them to a receiving station. Continuing to gather imaging data as it enters the atmosphere may be useful for precisely guiding a manoeuvring reentry vehicle, although the Pukguksong-2 has not yet been tested with one.

== History ==
After the successful launch of Pukguksong-1 in August 2016, North Korean leader Kim Jong Un ordered to develop a land-based version of this missile, planned to have an extended range.

In October 2016, North Korea launched two ballistic missiles but failed. Initially, these launches were thought to be Hwasong-10, however, it is possible that the missiles used in the tests could be Pukguksong-2. Since North Korea did not issue a press release mentioning these test-fires, it is hard to identify the missile used in these launches.

The Pukguksong-2's maiden test flight occurred on 12 February 2017. The state-run Korean Central News Agency said that Kim Jong Un supervised the test, which was described as a success.

Pukguksong-2 was displayed during the April 2017 military parade. A month later, on 21 May 2017, another successful test of Pukguksong-2 occurred.

In 2019, the Pukguksong-2 was reported to be deployed in North Korea near the Chinese border at the same bases as the Hwasong-7.

North Korea displayed Pukguksong-2 at a military parade on 10 October 2020.

== List of tests ==
Attempt	Date	Location	Pre-launch announcement / detection	Outcome	Additional notes	References
1	12 February 2017, about 8:00am Pyongyang Standard Time	40.011572423°N 125.218110711°E, Iha-ri Vehicle Testing and Driver Training Facility, Kusong	None	Success	The report stated that United States and South Korea military were initially trying to determine whether the missile was a Hwasong-7 or a modified Hwasong-10 missile, with some analysis by Jeffrey Lewis of the Center for Nonproliferation Studies at the Middlebury Institute of International Studies suggested that this test should be treated as North Korean's test of an ICBM first stage. Less than a day later, North Korean state media announced the first successful launch of Pukguksong-2. The missile's trajectory was high-angled with due consideration of the safety of neighboring countries. The test also represented "the mobility and operation of the new type missile launching truck". The missile reached an altitude of 550 km (340 mi) and flew a distance of about 500 km (310 mi), landing off its east coast, towards Japan. This launch occurred during a state visit by Japanese Prime Minister Shinzo Abe to the golf resort of President Trump in Florida and also the first missile test under Trump's administration. The two heads of state presented a united front in response. At the White House on Friday, Shinzo Abe called the test "absolutely intolerable" and said that Trump "assured me the United States will always stand with Japan 100 percent." Donald Trump did not give a mention of South Korea at all.	
2	21 May 2017, about 4:29pm Pyongyang Standard Time	39.6180283°N 125.8035851°E, Lake Yonpung, Anju, South Pyongan Province	None	Success	The missile reached an altitude of 560 km (350 mi) and flew 500 km (310 mi), landing off its east coast. The test was to verify the functionality of Pukguksong-2's solid-fueled engine. Following the test, North Korea reported that it was the final test launch to verify all technical characteristics performed "perfect" and initial operating capability and mass-production would soon proceed.	

== See also ==
- Pukguksong-1
- Pukguksong-3
- Hwasong-12
- RT-15
