= Time in Korea =

Time in Korea may refer to:

- Time in North Korea
- Time in South Korea
