= Sakkanmol Missile Operating Base =

North Korean military base

Coordinates: 38.584698°N 126.107945°E

- Hangul: 삿갓몰
- RR: Satganmol
- MR: Satkanmol

Sakkanmol Missile Operating Base (Korean: 삿갓몰) (Note: Satkat (삿갓) means a conical hat and mol (몰) means a village. Alternatively transliterated as Sagangmall, Satgatmol, Sakkan-mol, Sakken-mol, Sakkenmol, Saksan Mol, and Saksangmol) is a North Korean military base for short-range ballistic missiles located in North Hwanghae Province, approximately 85 kilometers north of the Korean Demilitarized Zone.

== History ==
Construction for the base was begun between 1991 and 1993 by KPA Unit No. 583. Construction for support structures began in 2004. Missile launch was conducted on March 10, 2016.

== Operations ==
The Base is operated by the Korean People's Army Strategic Force.

== See also ==
- Category: North Korea's missile bases (in Korean Wikipedia)
