= Panghyon Airport =

Airport in North Korea

- IATA: N/A; ICAO: N/A; FAA LID: N/A

Summary
- Airport type: Military
- Serves: Kusong, North Korea
- Elevation AMSL: 293 ft (89 m)
- Coordinates: 39°55′38.90″N 125°12′28.40″E

Map
- Location within North Korea Location within Asia Location within North Pacific Location within Earth

Runways
Direction	Length		Surface
Direction	ft	m	Surface
13/31	8,500	2,591	Concrete

- Panghyon Airport
- Hangul: 방현비행장
- Hanja: 方峴飛行場
- RR: Banghyeon bihaengjang
- MR: Panghyŏn pihaengjang

Panghyon Airport (also written Banghyon airfield) is an airport near Panghyŏn-dong in Kusong, Pyongan-bukto, North Korea.

== Facilities ==
The airfield has a single concrete runway 13/31, measuring 8500 x 180 feet (3277 x 55 m). It has a full-length parallel taxiway and other taxiways leading to hangars. Earth revetments are located along the parallel taxiway. Some aeronautical charts show a second north–south runway; however it may just be a taxiway.

== Missile Base ==
In December 2016, U.S. analysts reported that a missile base had been constructed approximately 13 miles from the airport, and was possibly the site for Hwasong-10 missiles tests in October. It is also the site of North Korea's first successful test-launch of the Hwasong-14, the country's first intercontinental ballistic missile, on July 4, 2017.

From 2023 onwards, satellite imagery indicated that the airfield was the center of North Korea's development of a domestic unmanned surveillance vehicles, which was followed by the announcement of the Saebyeol-4 and Saebyeol-9 on 27 July 2023. Continued R&D of the drones, followed by the development of loitering munition greatly expanded over the following years, indicated by explosion craters present on satellite imagery.

Satellite imagery from September 2026 pointed to a clear a plot of agricultural land adjacent to existing hangars and possible expansion of what is considered one of the main drone development and testing bases.
