= Hwasong-14 =

North Korean intercontinental ballistic missile

- Second test flight of Hwasong-14
- Type: Intercontinental ballistic missile
- Place of origin: North Korea

Service history
- In service: First successful test on 4 July 2017
- Used by: Korean People's Army Strategic Force

Production history
- Produced: 2017–present
- No. built: Unknown

Specifications
- Mass: 31,000–32,000 kg (68,000–71,000 lb)
- Length: 19.5 m (64 ft)
- Diameter: 1.8 m (5.9 ft)
- Warhead weight: 300–500 kg (660–1,100 lb)
- Engine: Two-stage, liquid-fueled 470 kN (48 tf) (first stage); 40.6 kN (4.14 tf) (second stage)
- Propellant: UDMH/N_{2}O_{4}
- Operational range: 10,000 km (6,200 mi)
- Flight altitude: 3,720 km (2,310 mi) (lofted trajectory)
- Launch platform: Road-mobile TEL

- Korean name
- Chosŏn'gŭl: 《화성-14》형
- Hancha: 火星14型
- Revised Romanization: Hwaseong 14-hyeong
- McCune–Reischauer: Hwasŏng 14-hyŏng

The Hwasong-14 (Note: Also known as KN-20 under the US naming convention.) (Korean: 《화성-14》형; lit. 'Mars Type 14') is a mobile intercontinental ballistic missile developed by North Korea. It had its maiden flight on 4 July 2017, which coincided with the United States' Independence Day. North Korea is the only known operator of this missile.

== Description ==
The Hwasong-14 is likely a two-stage version of the Hwasong-12 first tested in May 2017. The second stage appears to have increased its range. The first stage engine appears very similar to the Hwasong-12. With a single liquid fuel engine, it has four vernier thrusters for stability and guidance. Based on images, the missile is estimated to be 19.5 m (64 ft) long and 1.8 m (5.9 ft) wide, and has a takeoff mass of 31,000–32,000 kg (68,000–71,000 lb).

A detailed analysis by the Bulletin of the Atomic Scientists claims that the current variant of the Hwasong-14 may not even be capable of delivering a first-generation nuclear warhead to Anchorage, Alaska. But even if North Korea is now capable of fabricating a relatively light-weight, "miniaturized" atomic bomb that can survive the extreme reentry environments of long-range rocket delivery, it will, with certainty, not be able to deliver such an atomic bomb to the lower 48 states of the United States with the rocket tested on 3 July and 28 July.

A first-generation North Korean nuclear missile warhead is estimated to weigh 500–600 kg (1,100–1,300 lb). Calculations of the range of the Hwasong-14 carrying such a payload vary from 6,000–8,000 km (3,700–5,000 mi), enough to reach Anchorage and Honolulu, Hawaii, to as much as 10,400 km (6,500 mi), enough to reach major U.S. west coast cities, including Seattle and Los Angeles, but with a lighter warhead at 300–500 kg (660–1,100 lb). The 10,400 km (6,500 mi)-range is based on the 200 kg (440 lb) reentry vehicle carried during the July 2017 tests, although such a payload is much lighter than North Korea is believed to be capable of weaponizing.

Although the missile is mounted on a transporter erector launcher, it is launched from a detachable platform on a concrete pad. This could have several operational ramifications. It may increase the time required to launch the Hwasong-12, and limit the number of launch locations to pre-sited and pre-constructed launch pads.

=== Engine ===
Michael Elleman of IISS and the Bulletin of the Atomic Scientists both claim that available evidence clearly indicates that the engine is based on the Soviet RD-250 family of engines for the R-36 missile, and has been modified to operate as the boosting force for the Hwasong-12 and -14, which is capable of producing a thrust of 470 kN (48 tf).

According to Michael Elleman, through illicit channels operating in Russia and/or Ukraine, North Korea acquired an unknown number of RD-250 engines. Its need for an alternative to the failing Hwasong-10 and the recent appearance of the RD-250 engine along with other evidences, suggests the transfers occurred in 2015–2017. South Korean intelligence data shows North Korea received 20 to 40 RD-251 engines from Russia in 2016. Ukraine rejected this theory, claiming it was "most likely provoked by Russian secret services" to "cover their own crimes", and to prevent United States from transferring FGM-148 Javelin anti-tank missile to Ukraine. Other US experts have questioned whether the evidence for Elleman's theory is strong enough to back up his claims. Engine maker Yuzhnoye Design Office denied that the engines were supplied to North Korea by Ukraine.

In August 2017, the State Space Agency of Ukraine claimed that the rocket engine used during 28 July 2017 North Korea's missile test was RD-250 made at a Ukrainian factory, but solely for use in Tsyklon space rockets supplied to Russia. The space agency chief said that according to Ukrainian information, "Russia today has between 7 and 20 of the Tsyklon rockets...They have these engines, they have the documentation. They can supply these engines from the finished rockets to whoever they want." The agency also claimed that a total of 223 Tsyklon-2 and Tsyklon-3 rockets were supplied to Russia. Furthermore, he stated that North Korea cannot produce the fuel for the RD-250 (N_{2}O_{4} and UDMH), and that it must have been produced either in China or in Ukraine.

Arms expert Jeffrey Lewis claimed that the second stage of Hwasong-14 is similar to the upper stages designed for the Iranian space launch vehicles. According to German expert Norbert Brügge, the second stage engine has a thrust of 40.6 kN (4.14 tf).

== History ==
=== Early plan for ICBM and suspected engine tests ===
In 2012 and 2015, North Korea displayed two versions of Hwasong-13. However, the Hwasong-13 project was apparently cancelled.

In early 2017, during his New Year's speech, Kim Jong Un announced that North Korea was in the final stages of testing its ICBM.

In March and June 2017, North Korea was suspected to test Hwasong-14's engine twice.

=== First test flight ===
The first publicly announced flight test was on 4 July 2017, to coincide with the US Independence Day celebrations. This flight had a claimed range of 933 kilometres (580 miles) eastwards into the Sea of Japan (East Sea of Korea) and reached an altitude of 2,802 km (1,741 mi) during a 39-minute flight.

This range was deliberately shortened, to avoid encroaching on other nations' territory, by 'lofting' the missile: firing it on a trajectory that was inefficiently high, rather than optimised for range. This allows the missile's performance to be tested and demonstrated, without requiring a huge test range.

A prediction for the possible range, following an optimum trajectory, has been given at 6,700 km (4,200 mi) or as much as 10,400 km (6,500 mi) not taking into account the Earth’s rotation. If true, then this brings the U.S. states of Alaska and Hawaii within the missile's range.

=== Second test flight ===
Preparations for a second test flight were detected by US intelligence as early as 20 July. On 28 July, the missile was fired at 11:41 p.m local time, the first time a night-time launch was carried out. The missile was fired at a lofted trajectory with apogee of 3,700 km (2,300 mi), landing 998 km (620 mi) away with a total flight time of approximately 47 minutes. Based on the data from the test flight, if the missile were fired at the optimal efficient trajectory, it is predicted that the maximum effective range would exceed 10,000 km (6,200 mi). If factoring in the rotation of the Earth, which may provide a range boost when travelling eastward, the Hwasong-14’s coverage area would include the US West Coast, Chicago, and possibly even New York, but only with a substantially reduced payload.

== List of Hwasong-14 tests ==
Attempt	Date	Location	Pre-launch announcement or detection	Outcome	Additional notes	References
1	4 July 2017	near Panghyon Airport, 39.872126°N 125.269258°E	None	Success	ICBM variant of Hwasong-12 with a second stage added and smaller reentry vehicle was fired on a lofted trajectory with apogee of 2,802 km (1,741 mi), landing 933 km (580 mi) away in the Sea of Japan.	
2	28 July 2017	near Mupyong-ni, Chagang Province	Detected by US intelligence since 20 July.	Success	The missile was fired on a lofted trajectory with apogee of 3,724.9 km (2,314.5 mi), landing 998 km (620 mi) away in the Sea of Japan near Hokkaido, with a total flight time of 47 minutes, 12 seconds.	

== Gallery ==
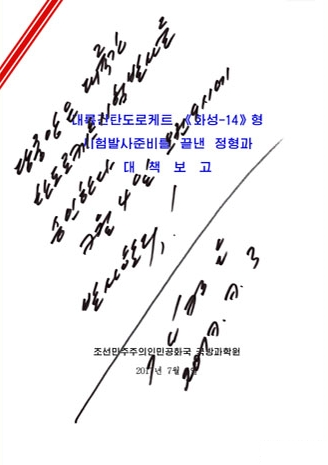
Kim Jong Un's order for the first test flight

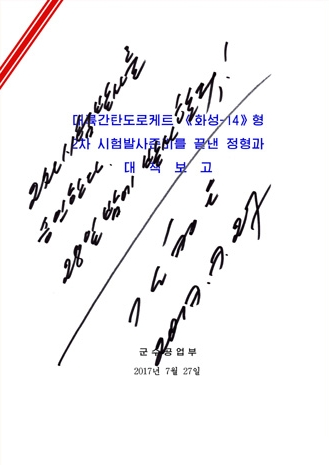
Kim's order for the second test

Very high angle lofted trajectories of Hwasong-14, along with Hwasong-15 and Hwasong-17

== See also ==
- Hwasong-12
- Hwasong-15
