= Hwasong-17 =

- Artist rendition of the missile, with two versions: Longer first stage (left) and shorter first stage (right)
- Type: Intercontinental ballistic missile
- Place of origin: North Korea

Service history
- In service: 2022–present
- Used by: Korean People's Army Strategic Force

Production history
- Designed: 2020
- Manufacturer: North Korea
- Produced: 2020–present

Specifications
- Mass: 80,000–110,000 kilograms (180,000–240,000 lb)
- Length: 26 m (85 ft)
- Diameter: 2.7 metres (8.9 ft)
- Warhead: Nuclear warhead, possibly MRV
- Warhead weight: 2,000–3,500 kg (4,400–7,700 lb)
- Engine: First stage: two RD-250-type rocket engines 180 tf (1,800 kN) (vacuum)
- Propellant: liquid propellant
- Operational range: 15,000 km (9,300 mi)
- Launch platform: 11-axle transporter erector launcher (TEL)

The Hwasong-17 (Note: Officially called Hwasongpho-17.) (Korean: 《화성포-17》형; lit. 'Mars Artillery Type 17') is a North Korean two-stage, liquid-fueled intercontinental ballistic missile. First unveiled on 10 October 2020 at a military parade, the Japanese Ministry of Defence estimates its operational range at 15,000 km (9,300 mi) or more. Unlike its predecessors, the Hwasong-17 may be capable of carrying multiple warheads. North Korea claimed the Hwasong-17's first successful launch occurred on 24 March 2022. Some Western analysts instead believe the 24 March launch was an earlier missile design, and a later test that took place on 18 November 2022 was the first successful test launch.

== Description ==
The Hwasong-17 is assumed to be a two-stage, liquid-fueled road-mobile ICBM. It is carried by a 11-axle, 22-wheeled transporter erector launcher (TEL) vehicle. Based on images released by North Korea, the missile's mass, length and diameter are judged to be about 80,000–110,000 kg (180,000–240,000 lb), 26 metres (85 ft) and 2.7 metres (8.9 ft), respectively. It is considered to be the largest road-mobile, liquid-fueled ICBM in service. The first stage uses two RD-250-based engines with four chambers, providing a thrust of approximately 180 tf (1,800 kN) in vacuum. The exact capabilities of the missile are as yet unconfirmed, though speculation by experts has fueled questions as to whether it could reach cities within the United States and potentially evade U.S. missile defenses too. It has a payload capacity of about 2,000–3,500 kg (4,400–7,700 lb) and can have the capability of carrying multiple independently targetable reentry vehicle (MIRV) as well, which would be a less expensive way to launch multiple warheads than deploying many ICBMs with single warhead payloads. The size and configuration of the 11-axle TEL indicates North Korea has developed a domestic capacity to manufacture such vehicles, a matter of concern to observers as attempting to block procurement of foreign-built TELs was one limitation on the nation's ICBM force. The country being able to produce their own launchers lifts that constraint and enables them to have the capacity to fire greater numbers of missiles.

Information from Japan's defense minister Yasukazu Hamada and from the March 2022 test-fire suggests that the Hwasong-17's operational range of the Hwasong-17 is 15,000 km (9,300 mi) or more, if mounted with a sufficiently light warhead. Ankit Panda of the Carnegie Endowment for International Peace agreed that if the successful November missile test had been fired at the US instead of up into the air, it could easily reach anywhere in the continental United States. An alleged unsuccessful test-flight occurred on 2 November 2022 (Note: Another source states that this alleged test-fire occurred on 3 November 2022. It was initially assessed that the missile used for this launch was Hwasong-17; however, the actual missile used for the launch was the modified version of Hwasong-15. For more information, see Hwasong-15 § Modified version.) had suggested the Hwasong-17 might be unreliable. As of November 2022, it is unknown how much a large (for example, MRV) warhead would reduce Hwasong-17 range, and it is also unknown whether North Korean ICBM technology has the ability to deliver a warhead that survives re-entry into the atmosphere.

Since the Hwasong-15 was already capable of striking most of the contiguous United States, the development of an even larger missile suggests North Korea is pursuing MRV, or even MIRV, payloads. As of 2020, the Ground-Based Midcourse Defense system comprises 44 interceptors, requiring the launch of at least four to guarantee a hit, enabling it to protect against a maximum of 11 warheads. The Hwasong-17 may contain three or four warheads, or potentially a mix of decoys and real warheads, so the launch of just a few missiles would be enough to overwhelm U.S. defenses. Despite posing such a threat, the missile is greatly limited by its sheer size. The combined weight of the missile and its TEL restricts movement to North Korea's limited network of paved roads, as it would only be able to travel short distances on unpaved roads and only on sturdy ground. Unlike smaller liquid-fueled ballistic missiles, it is unlikely that it can be fueled at a secure location and then driven to and erected at a pre-surveyed site to cut down on launch preparation time, as vibrations during movement of such a large missile would risk causing damage and leaking volatile fuel. This restricts fueling to once it arrives at the launch site itself, a process requiring several hours to complete, leaving the missile exposed and vulnerable to pre-launch attack. The Hwasong-17's multiple warhead capability is also speculative, as it requires complex guidance and warhead release mechanisms needing significant flight testing to ensure reliability, and no test launches had been conducted by the time of its public unveiling.

In August 2021, commander of United States Northern Command Glen D. VanHerck stated that the "KN-28 missile has a much larger capability, and the total number of missiles tends to increase." This suggests that the United States's designation of Hwasong-17 is KN-28, not the KN-27.

With its alleged test flight in March 2022, General Secretary of the Workers' Party of Korea Kim Jong Un stressed the development of the missile as a "a symbol of Juche power and fruition of self-reliance, [was] completed as a core strike means and a reliable nuclear war deterrence means of the DPRK strategic forces".

The missile fired on 18 November 2022 had some modifications, such as a shorter first stage, the rearrangement of the small motors on the payload fairing, wider interstage section and possible lengthened propellant tanks of the second stage.

=== Satellite launch vehicle derivative ===
The Hwasong-17 may also contribute to ICBM testing by acting as a satellite launch vehicle (SLV), as the missile serves as the first stage of the Chollima-1 SLV, which unsuccessfully tried to launch a satellite on 31 May 2023 when the second stage booster failed to ignite and had a successful flight on 21 November 2023. North Korea has only fired long-range ballistic missiles on lofted trajectories, in part because tracking can only be done from land-based sensors. The ability to receive data signals is lost at a certain distance and altitude due to the Earth's curvature, and they lack ships or planes to continue monitoring an RV beyond those distances. The Hwasong-17 has more capable rocket motors and more energetic liquid propellants than North Korea's previous Taepodong-2/Unha-3 booster, making it able to launch a satellite twice as heavy as was previously possible into low Earth orbit. While the ICBM configuration of Hwasong-17 can deliver a 400 kg (880 lb) payload to a 500 km (310 mi) Low Earth orbit, the payload capacity can be increased if North Korea configures it to be an SLV, making it a medium-lift launch vehicle. The missile's first launches were claimed to be related to testing elements for a reconnaissance satellite. As an SLV, Hwasong-17 could launch a satellite that would be in a position to monitor future ICBM flights and payload reentry from space, enabling more realistic testing by firing them on normal trajectories out to further distances.

== History ==
Hwasong-17 made its public debut in a military parade on 10 October 2020. It was mounted on 11-axle launchers and appeared at the parade's end. North Korea called Hwasong-17 as "new strategic weapon" without mentioning official designation, and the missile was tentatively named Hwasong-16.

At the Self-Defence-2021 exhibition, North Korea revealed the official name of the missile as Hwasong-17.

Test launches of the Hwasong-17 were allegedly carried out first on 27 February 2022, and again on 5 March. North Korea did not publicize news of the launches, with INDOPACOM revealing them later. The United States believed the tests were not intended to demonstrate the ICBM's range but conduct early evaluations of its capabilities. North Korea publicly claimed the launches were intended to test components of a reconnaissance satellite at operational altitudes without disclosing they had been lofted by the new ICBM. It is possible the launches were done to test both satellite components and the ICBM, but only the former was admitted to limit potential international criticism. Missile expert Jeffrey Lewis also raised the possibility that these were launches of the post-boost vehicle for the second stage of the Hwasong-17. A missile launch was attempted on 16 March 2022, but it was a failure. It is possible that it was a Hwasong-17 test, but was not acknowledged by North Korea due to the unsuccessful launch.

A test launch of a disputed missile type was carried out by North Korea on 24 March 2022. The launch was a technical success that broke many records for North Korea, for example regarding height and flight time. The footage of the launch may have been doctored, with missile analysts being unable to confirm that the missile that was launched on 24 March was a Hwasong-17, due to inconsistencies with objects in the background of the launch, which matched to satellite imagery on an earlier date than 24 March. Two shots of the observation bus that Kim Jong Un was in appeared to be taken in different locations and grass that was burnt in a controlled burn appeared to be unburnt on Korean Central Television footage. South Korean intelligence alleges that the missile launched on 24 March was likely an improved and modified Hwasong-15, though according to NK News, there may be other reasons for using old footage, such as a camera failure. After the test, Hwasong-17 appeared at the 25 April 2022 military parade. A further test took place on 18 November 2022.

At a parade on 8 February 2023 marking the 75th anniversary of the Korean People’s Army, twelve Hwasong-17s on mobile launchers were displayed. Depending on the exact number of missiles and potential multiple reentry vehicles, North Korea could technically have reached the point where they have enough ICBMs carrying enough warheads to overwhelm the existing amount of GMD interceptors, although no multiple warhead tests had yet been conducted. A third test flight occurred on 16 March 2023.

== List of tests ==
=== Announced tests ===
Attempt	Date (Pyongyang Standard Time)	Location	Pre-launch announcement	Outcome	Additional notes	References
1	24 March 2022, 2:34 p.m.	Sil-li missile facility, near Pyongyang International Airport	Signs of an ICBM or satellite launch were allegedly detected by the United States.	Success	First announced test of the Hwasong-17, with an apogee of 6,248.5 km (3,882.6 mi) and a horizontal displacement of 1,090 km (680 mi), with a total flight time of 4,052 seconds. Kim Jong Un, who issued the launch order a day before the test flight, supervised the launch, and celebrated with soldiers and researchers from the Academy of National Defense Science. United States condemned the launch. The launch could have instead been an extended range Hwasong-15, with video footage of the launch being inconsistent with the conditions on 24 March.	
2	18 November 2022, 10:14 a.m.	Pyongyang International Airport	None	Success	Second test firing of Hwasong-17 that has been publicly acknowledged by North Korean state media. Kim Jong Un supervised the launch along with his wife and daughter. The missile flew on a lofted trajectory, reaching a maximum altitude of 6,040.9 km (3,753.6 mi) while flying 999.2 km (620.9 mi) with a maximum speed of Mach 22 (27,000 km/h; 16,700 mph). The total flight time was 4,135 seconds. After the test, a transporter erector launcher (numbered 321), which was used for launching Hwasong-17 in this launch, was awarded three titles: Hero of the Republic, Order of the National Flag first class and Gold Star Medal.	
3	16 March 2023, 7:09 a.m.	Pyongyang International Airport	None	Success	Third test firing of Hwasong-17 that has been publicly acknowledged by North Korean state media. Kim Jong Un supervised the launch along with his wife and daughter. The missile flew on a lofted trajectory covering a distance of 1,000.2 km (621.5 mi) and reaching a maximum altitude of approximately 6,045 km (3,756 mi). The total flight time was 4,151 seconds.	

=== Alleged tests ===
Attempt	Date (Pyongyang Standard Time)	Location	Pre-launch announcement	Outcome	Additional notes	References
1	27 February 2022	Pyongyang International Airport	None	Success	According to North Korea, the test was intended for testing reconnaissance satellite components. The missile was launched using lofted trajectory and achieved 620 km (390 mi) apogee, 300 km (190 mi) range. North Korea did not publish images of the launcher, instead, only images taken from launcher were published, and the launcher was later identified to be Hwasong-17. It is possible that the test was for verifying some functions before a maximum-range test-fire.	
2	5 March 2022	Pyongyang International Airport	None	Success	North Korea also claimed the launch to test reconnaissance satellite components. The missile was launched using lofted trajectory and flew 270 km (170 mi), achieved 560 km (350 mi) apogee. North Korea also did not publish images of the launcher, which was later identified to be Hwasong-17. It is possible that the test was for verifying some functions before a maximum-range test-fire.	
3	16 March 2022, 9:30 a.m.	Pyongyang International Airport	None	Failure	The projectile exploded at an altitude below 20 km (12 mi). Later, it was identified as Hwasong-17. Its erratic flight path and destruction of the missile could be witnessed from Pyongyang, and debris from the failed test fell near the city. It is possible that the footage of the claimed successful launch occurred eight days later is from this test.	
4	4 May 2022	Pyongyang International Airport	Around 30 April and 3 May, satellite captured some objects appear to be vehicles gathering at Pyongyang International Airport's northern runway. It is possible that these activities were for agriculture-related purposes.	Failure	It is possible that the missile was Hwasong-15. The missile flew 470 km (290 mi), achieved 780 km (480 mi) apogee, with a maximum speed of Mach 11 (13,500 km/h). North Korea did not release a press statement about the launch.	
5	25 May 2022	Pyongyang International Airport	30 minutes before the test-fire, satellite imagery showed an object, appears to be the missile's TEL.	Failure	According to South Korean data, the missile flew 360 km (220 mi) with an apogee of 540 km (340 mi). North Korea did not release a press statement about the launch. Over 30 minutes after the launch, North Korea test-fired two additional short-range ballistic missiles.	

== In popular culture ==
In February 2023, the Korea Stamp Corporation unveiled a series of stamps commemorating the November 2022 test-fire of Hwasong-17. Seven months later, the Hwasong-17, along with Hwasong-18 and Hwasal-2, was reported to be featured in patriotic desks for wearing. In November 2023, to celebrate the successful November 2022 test, North Korea created a new holiday on 18 November, called Missile Industry Day. Later, in May 2024, Hwasong-17-modeled toys and fireworks were also reported to be sold in North Korea.

Hwasong-17 is also featured in North Korean propaganda posters.

== Gallery ==
Lofted trajectories of Hwasong-14, Hwasong-15 and Hwasong-17

Hwasong-17 during 10 October 2020 parade

== See also ==
- R-14 Chusovaya
- R-26 (missile)
- UR-100N
- DF-5
