= Hwasong-15 =

North Korean mobile intercontinental ballistic missile

- Artist rendition of the missile and its TEL
- Type: Intercontinental ballistic missile
- Place of origin: North Korea

Service history
- Used by: Korean People's Army Strategic Force

Production history
- Manufacturer: North Korea
- Produced: 2017–present
- No. built: Unknown

Specifications
- Mass: About 72,000 kg (159,000 lb)
- Length: 22.5 m (74 ft)
- Diameter: 2.4 m (7 ft 10 in)
- Warhead: nuclear weapon, possibly MIRV
- Warhead weight: 1,000 kg (2,200 lb)
- Engine: 1 Paektusan (potentially RD-250); 788 kN (177,000 lbf)
- Propellant: N_{2}O_{4}/UDMH
- Operational range: 13,000 km (8,100 mi) (estimated)
- Flight altitude: 4,500 km (2,800 mi) (lofted trajectory)
- Launch platform: 9-axle transporter erector launcher (TEL)

- Korean name
- Chosŏn'gŭl: 《화성-15》형
- Hancha: 火星15型
- Literal meaning: Mars Type 15
- Revised Romanization: Hwaseong-15hyeong
- McCune–Reischauer: Hwasŏng-15hyŏng

The Hwasong-15 (Note: Also known as Hwasongpho-15 (《화성포-15》형; lit. 'Mars Artillery Type 15') and KN-22 under the United States naming convention.) (Korean: 《화성-15》형; lit. 'Mars Type 15') is a North Korean road-mobile, liquid-fueled intercontinental ballistic missile. First test-fired on 28 November 2017, it is the first ballistic missile developed by North Korea that is theoretically capable of reaching all of the United States' mainland.

== Design ==
=== Missile ===
Judged from images released by North Korea, the Hwasong-15 is 22.5 m (74 ft) in length, 2.4 m (7 ft 10 in) wide and has a body mass of about 72,000 kg (159,000 lb). It is longer and wider than Hwasong-14 by 2 m (6 ft 7 in) and 0.4–0.8 m (1 ft 4 in – 2 ft 7 in), respectively.

Based on its trajectory and distance, the missile would have a range of more than 13,000 km (8,100 mi) – more than enough to reach Washington D.C. and the rest of the United States, albeit, according to the Union of Concerned Scientists, probably with a reduced payload. Several important US allies, including the United Kingdom, France and Australia, also lie within the missile's theoretical range, which covers most of Earth's land masses except South America, the Caribbean, and the majority of Antarctica. However, in the first flight, North Korea fired Hwasong-15 using lofted trajectory, in which the missile can reach nearly 4,500 km (2,800 mi) apogee, but also has a reduced range of 950 km (590 mi).

The different densities of different casing materials and explosive mechanisms (e.g. metallic-based conventional explosives tend to be several times heavier than a corresponding volume of organic explosives) make accurately estimating warhead payload based on images alone very difficult, if not impossible. Based on the limited information available, the Union of Concerned Scientists did conclude that equipping the missile with a normal-sized payload would likely reduce the overall range.

=== Engine ===
According to international weapons analysts, the Hwasong-15 first stage has a gimbaled two-chambered main engine system, as opposed to the Hwasong-12 and Hwasong-14 which have one fixed main chamber and four gimbaled steering vernier thruster chambers.

The second-stage engine for the Hwasong-15 was test-fired on 23 June 2017.

According to missile specialist Norbert Brügge, the missile uses the Paektusan (백두산) engine, the first stage of the two-stage missile uses an RD-250 clone liquid propulsion system developed by Pyongyang, comprising two combustors fed by common turbopump to increase takeoff thrust. The new propulsion is estimated to have 788 kN (177,000 lbf) thrust, a 170 percent increase compared to the Hwasong-14.

=== Warhead ===
On 29 November 2017, Michael Elleman wrote for 38 North that at 13,000 km (8,100 mi), the payload would be around 150 kg (330 lb), based on flight data of the test and conjectured it was a reconfigured Hwasong-14. On 30 November, after the publication of the images and video of the launch, he wrote a subsequent article on 38 North in which he stated that he first visualized the design of the missile based solely on flight data. After seeing the images and video, Elleman increased the maximum estimate of payload from 150 kg (330 lb) to 1,000 kg (2,200 lb) at a range of 13,000 km (8,100 mi). He noted major differences in the design of the actual Hwasong-15 and the missile he visualized the day before, from the dimensions to two nozzles/engine instead of one, such as on the Hwasong-14.

Analysts have noted that the re-entry vehicle has a blunter nose than previous designs, which can accommodate a larger diameter warhead and reduces re-entry stress and heating at the cost of accuracy. Some analysts think it may be able to carry additional payloads such as decoys or even multiple warheads.

=== Launch vehicle ===
The 9-axle transporter erector launcher (TEL) vehicle is larger compared to the 8-axle TEL vehicle of the Hwasong-14. However, just like the Hwasong-14, the launch footage from November 2017 test indicates the missile was fired from a fixed launch pad, not from the vehicle.

Information from the February 2023 launch suggests that the Hwasong-15 was fired directly from a moblie launch vehicle. As Hwasong-15 is a road-mobile missile mounted on TELs, it is easy to evade detection, meaning the missile is favourable for a surprise launch.

== History ==
Hwasong-15's first successful launch occurred on 28 November 2017, around 3 a.m. local time. It was the first launch after a 10-week break. Although North Korean state media announced the successful launch a day later, images were only released on 30 November, two days after the test.

North Korea displayed Hwasong-15 during military parades on 8 February 2018, 10 October 2020 and 25 April 2022.

After the maiden launch in November 2017, it was suspected that Hwasong-15 had been operationally deployed. In November 2022, North Korea confirmed that Hwasong-15 had entered service within their armed forces.

A further test-flight of Hwasong-15 occurred on 18 February 2023. In this test, North Korea used "Hwasongpho-15" designation instead of "Hwasong-15", which was first spotted in 2021.

== List of tests ==
=== Confirmed tests ===
Attempt	Date (Pyongyang Standard Time)	Location	Outcome	Additional notes	References
1	28 November 2017	Pyongsong	Success	Immediately after the launch, many analysts assumed that a Hwasong-14 had been fired; subsequently, however, the North Korean government released video of the launch showing a completely different missile. North Korea claimed the missile reached an altitude of around 4,475 km (2,781 mi) and traveled 950 km (590 mi) downrange, flying for a total time of 53 minutes. According to a statement by Japanese Minister of Defence Itsunori Onodera, the missile's re-entry vehicle failed to successfully re-enter the Earth's atmosphere, breaking apart and crashing into waters within Japan's exclusive economic zone. Later assessments from the Union of Concerned Scientists, however, raised questions as to whether the object Onodera described may have been the missile's detached first stage, not its re-entry vehicle.	
2	18 February 2023	Pyongyang International Airport	Success	The missile was fired by the 1st Red Flag Hero Company affiliated with Missile General Bureau under a sudden order issued by Kim Jong Un at 8:00 am on the same day. It travelled up to a maximum altitude of 5,768.5 km (3,584.4 mi) and flew 989 km (615 mi) for nearly 67 minutes before striking at its target in open waters of the Sea of Japan. North Korea rated this test as "Excellent" in the assessment.	

=== Alleged tests ===
The ICBM launch of 24 March 2022, which was claimed by North Korean state media as the launch of Hwasong-17, may be a test of Hwasong-15 or its modified version, according to South Korean and US intelligence.

== Modified version ==
Images of the Hwasong-15's modified version
- Launch of the missile

North Korea launched what appears to be an ICBM on 3 November 2022 from the Sunan area toward the east. Initially, South Korea assumed the missile to be a Hwasong-17. It reached a maximum speed of Mach 15 (18,400 km/h; 11,400 mph), flew 750 km (470 mi) and achieved an altitude of about 2,000 km (1,200 mi). The 30-minute flight ended after disappearing from the radar before going over Japan. It could be a failure as the second stage likely failed after separation before falling into the sea. Japan issued alerts to residents in Miyagi, Yamagata and Niigata prefectures under the J-Alert system as they assessed that the missile could overfly the country on a trajectory toward the Pacific Ocean, although later reports indicated it did not cross Japan.

Four days after the launch, North Korea released information and images for missile launches from 2 to 5 November. The ICBM launch of 3 November was referred as the launch of a ballistic missile "to paralyze enemy operation command systems". Images released by North Korea indicated a modified and shortened version of Hwasong-15, with an elongated shroud, a shortened first stage and a possible third stage. It was unofficially named Hwasong-15A or Hwasong-15B.

== Gallery ==
Lofted trajectories of Hwasong-14, Hwasong-15 and Hwasong-17

Hwasong-15 compared with United States's Titan II

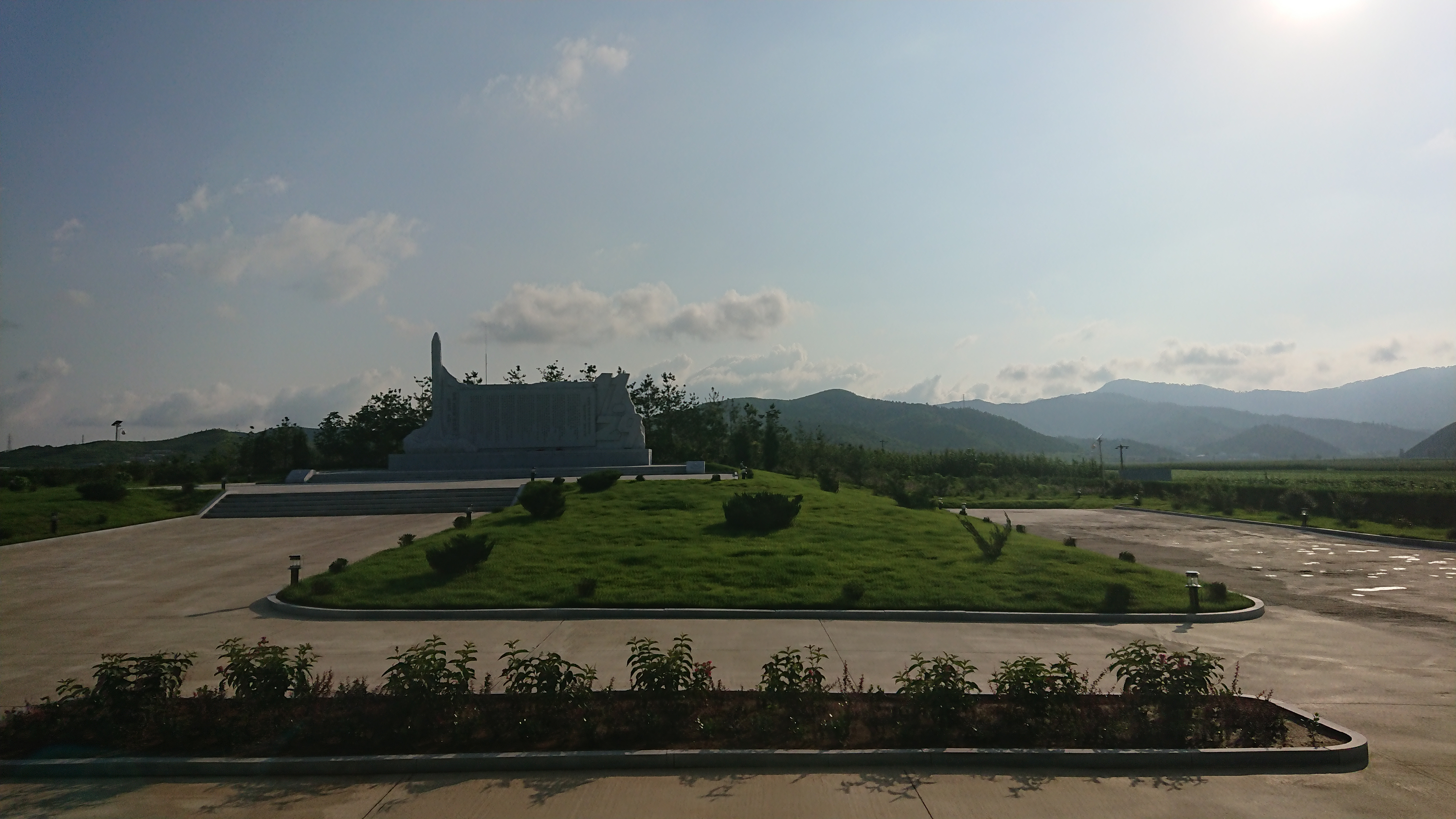
Memorial of Hwasong-15 launch, near Pyongsong

== See also ==
- 2017–2018 North Korea crisis
- Sanumdong Missile Research Facility
