= KN-02 Toksa =

Short-range ballistic missile

Hwasong-11
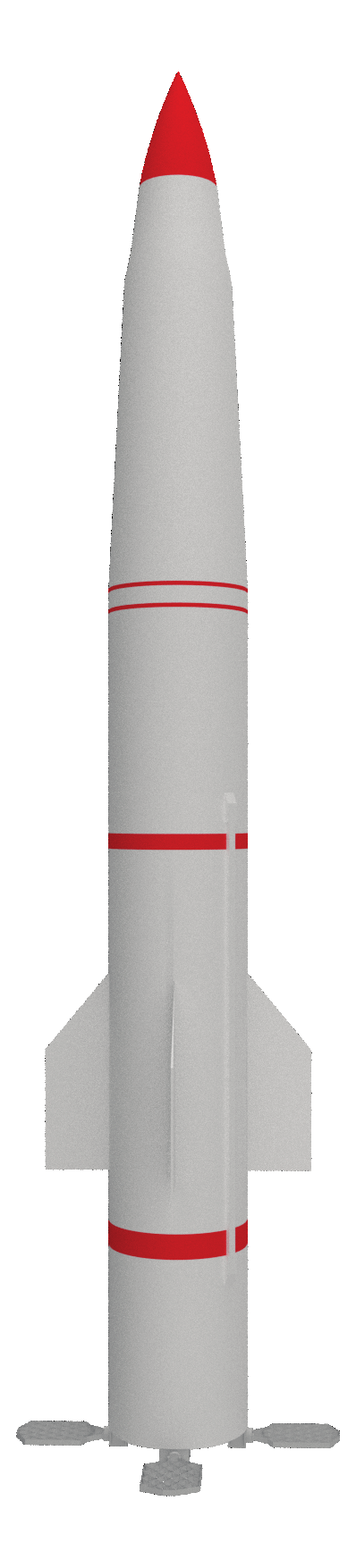
- Artist rendition of the missile
- Type: SRBM
- Place of origin: North Korea

Service history
- In service: 2008–present
- Used by: Korean People's Army Strategic Force

Specifications
- Mass: 2,010 kg (4,430 lb)
- Length: 6.4 m (21 ft)
- Diameter: 0.65 m (2.1 ft)
- Warhead: single high-explosive, submunition, chemical
- Warhead weight: 250 or 485 kg (551 or 1,069 lb)
- Engine: Solid-propellant rocket
- Operational range: 120–170 km (75–106 mi)
- Guidance system: Inertial, optical correlation system
- Accuracy: 100 m (330 ft)
- Launch platform: TEL

- Hwasong-11
- Hangul: 화성-11
- RR: Hwaseong-11
- MR: Hwasŏng-11

The Hwasong-11 (Korean: 화성-11; lit. 'Mars 11'; US designation: KN-02; US alternate name: Toksa (독사; lit. 'Viper') (Note: Jeffrey Lewis believes that Toska was selected for its similarity to Tochka.)) is a North Korean short-range ballistic missile (SRBM). It is based on the Soviet OTR-21 Tochka SRBM.

== Description ==
The Hwasong-11 is a short-ranged, solid fuelled, ballistic missile; it is North Korea's first solid-fuelled missile. The missile carries one non-nuclear warhead. (Note: Table 7.9. "North Korean forces with potential nuclear capability, January 2024" of the SIPRI Yearbook 2024 also omits the Hwasong-11.) It is "far from certain" how well the OTR-21's avionics were copied.

According to the CSIS Missile Defense Project, later versions increased range from 120 km to 170 km. In 2021, a report co-authored by the IISS reported a range of 140 km.

The missile is road-mobile on a transporter erector launcher (TEL). According to the KPA Journal in 2010, the TEL and a transporter with 2-4 missile reloads were based on the MAZ-630308-224 or -243 commercial truck.

== History ==
North Korea and Syria developed a "missile relationship" in the 1990s which included technical exchanges. Syrian transfers to North Korea included examples of the OTR-21 (possibly in 1994) and technical data in 1996 through a two week visit by Syrian technicians to North Korea. The first Hwasong-11 test in April 2004 failed. The missile reached initial operating capability in 2006-2008, and made its first official appearance at the 2007 Military Foundation Day parade.

In March 2014, a South Korean military source claimed that the KN-02's range had been extended to 170 km (110 mi) through improved engine performance. The source also claimed that North Korea possessed 100 missiles with 30 TELs deployed to fire them. In August 2014, three KN-02s were fired out to a range of 220 km (140 mi) and estimated to have 100 m (330 ft) circular error probable accuracy.

== Operators ==
- North Korea
  - Korean People's Army - "Some" in inventory as of 2024

== Sources ==
- Bermudez, Joseph S., Jr. (February 2010). "The KN-02 SRBM" (PDF). KPA Journal. 1 (2).
- Center for Energy and Security Studies; International Institute for Strategic Studies (14 July 2021). DPRK Strategic Capabilities and Security on the Korean Peninsula: Looking Ahead (PDF) (Report). International Institute for Strategic Studies.
- International Institute for Strategic Studies (2025). The Military Balance 2025. London: Routledge. ISBN 978-1-041-04967-8.
