= Hwasong-12 =

- Artist rendition of Hwasong-12 and its modified version, tested on 4 October 2022
- Type: Intermediate-range ballistic missile
- Place of origin: North Korea

Service history
- In service: 2017–present
- Used by: Korean People's Army Strategic Force

Production history
- Manufacturer: North Korea
- Developed into: Hwasong-8 (likely); Hwasong-12A; Hwasong-12B; Hwasong-14 (likely); October 2022 variant
- Produced: June 2017

Specifications
- Mass: 24.7 tons (estimated)
- Height: 16.5 m (54 ft) (estimated)
- Diameter: 1.5 m (4.9 ft) (estimated)
- Warhead: Conventional; possibly nuclear-capable
- Warhead weight: 500–650 kg (1,100–1,430 lb) (estimated)
- Engine: Liquid-propellant rocket, single chamber variant of Paektusan; 464.1 kN (104,300 lb_{f})
- Propellant: Hypergolic combination of unsymmetrical dimethylhydrazine (UDMH) as fuel, and either Dinitrogen tetroxide (N_{2}O_{4})
- Operational range: 3,700–6,000 km (2,300–3,700 mi) (estimated)
- Flight altitude: 2,111.5 km (1,312.0 mi) (lofted trajectory)
- Maximum speed: Mach 17 (20,800 km/h; 12,900 mph; 5,780 m/s)
- Guidance system: Inertial
- Accuracy: greater than 5 km (3.1 mi) CEP
- Launch platform: MAZ-based vehicle

- Korean name
- Chosŏn'gŭl: 《화성-12》형
- Hancha: 火星十二型
- Revised Romanization: Hwaseong-12
- McCune–Reischauer: Hwasŏng-12

The Hwasong-12 (Note: Also known as KN-17 under the U.S. naming convention.) (Korean: 《화성-12》형; lit. 'Mars Type 12') (Note: Also written in Korean as 《화성포-12》형 (Mars Artillery Type 12).) is a mobile intermediate-range ballistic missile developed by North Korea. The Hwasong-12 was first revealed to the international community in a military parade on 15 April 2017 celebrating the Day of the Sun which is the birth anniversary of North Korea's founding president, Kim Il Sung, although the first test took place on 4 April 2017. The first successful test-fire of Hwasong-12 occurred on 14 May 2017.

== Description ==
Based on photos of the launch on 14 May 2017, the Hwasong-12 appears to be a single-stage, liquid-fueled missile, using an engine configuration of a single combustion chamber and four vernier engines. The arrangement appears similar to the "high-thrust" engine test conducted in March 2017. Alternatively, it could be based on the engine used in the older Hwasong-10 with the addition of two more verniers. The Hwasong-12's engine is tentatively named Paektusan, which is based on the RD-250 engine design. According to Michael Elleman, the RD-250 engines were obtained through illicit channels operating in Russia and/or Ukraine; then North Korea used them as the technological base for Paektusan engines. However, Ukraine denied this theory.

Initial estimates suggest the Hwasong-12 would have a maximum range from between 3,700 kilometres (2,300 mi) with a 650 kg (1,430 lb) payload and 4,500 km (2,800 mi) with a 500 kg (1,100 lb) payload to as much as 6,000 km (3,700 mi). The missile is also claimed to have a circular error probable of greater than 5 km (3.1 mi).

During the April 2017 military parade, the Hwasong-12 was displayed on the Hwasong-10 mobile launcher, and it may be intended to replace the similarly performing Hwasong-10 which has been shown unreliable during its test program.

== History ==
In October 2016, North Korea launched two ballistic missiles but failed. Initially, these launches were thought to be Hwasong-10, however, it is possible that the missiles used in the tests could be Hwasong-12. Since North Korea did not issue a press release mentioning these test-fires, it is hard to identify the missile used in these launches.

The first test-fire of Hwasong-12 occurred on 4 April 2017. As North Korea did not publish information about the launch, the missile was misreported as a Scud variant. It received the United States's designation of KN-17. On 15 April 2017, the Hwasong-12 was first revealed to the world during a military parade. The following day, a test-fire of Hwasong-12 took place. However, the launch also failed. Another failed test flight also occurred on 29 April 2017.

Hwasong-12 had the first successful test flight on 14 May 2017. Further test-fires occurred on 28 August and 15 September 2017. Afterward, North Korea displayed Hwasong-12 during military parades on 8 February 2018 and 10 October 2020. A further test-fire occurred on 30 January 2022.

=== Mass production ===
In the press release about the January 2022 test, North Korea confirmed that the test was for evaluating the quality of serial-produced Hwasong-12 missiles.

In January 2023, Korean Central Television published undated images of Kim Jong Un inspecting mass-produced Hwasong-12 missiles, with an image showing he and his daughter Kim Ju Ae assessing 26 Hwasong-12 missiles without warheads.

== List of tests ==
=== Confirmed tests ===
| Attempt | Date | Location | Pre-launch announcement / detection | Outcome | Additional notes | References |
|---|---|---|---|---|---|---|
| 1 | 4 April 2017 06:12 a.m. Pyongyang Standard Time | Sinpo | None | Failure | Missile was reported to travel 60 km (37 mi) with an apogee of 189 km (117 mi) and be "pinwheeled" before the flight termination. | |
| 2 | 16 April 2017 05:51 a.m. Pyongyang Standard Time | Sinpo | None | Failure | The missile, previously misreported as a Scud variant, was reported to have exploded within four, five seconds after launch. | |
| 3 | 29 April 2017 05:33 a.m. Pyongyang Standard Time | Pukchang; 39.5076°N 125.9645°E | None | Failure | Reportedly, the missile flew 40 km (25 mi) before exploding, and it was also misidentified as a Scud-based anti-ship ballistic missile variant. | |
| 4 | 14 May 2017 04:58 a.m. Pyongyang Standard Time | Kusong | None | Success | Missile was fired on a lofted trajectory with apogee of 2,111.5 km (1,312.0 mi), landing 787 km (489 mi) away in the Sea of Japan. | |
| 5 | 29 August 2017 05:28 a.m. Pyongyang Standard Time | Sunan | None | Success | Missile was fired on a normal trajectory with apogee of 550 km (340 mi), flew over Hokkaido in total distance of 2,700 km (1,700 mi), landed in the Pacific Ocean 1,180 km (730 mi) east of the northern Japanese island. | |
| 6 | 15 September 2017 06:27 a.m. Pyongyang Standard Time | Sunan | United States intelligence detected the preparation of the launch two days before the test-fire, as North Korea began moving missile launcher. | Success | Missile was fired on a normal trajectory with apogee of 770 km (480 mi), flew over Hokkaido in total distance of 3,700 km (2,300 mi), landed in the Pacific Ocean 2,200 km (1,400 mi) east of Cape Erimo, Hokkaido. Longest trajectory by a North Korean missile as of launch date. | |
| 7 | 30 January 2022 07:52 a.m. Pyongyang Standard Time | Jagang | None | Success | Missile was fired on a lofted trajectory with apogee of 2,000 km (1,200 mi), landing 800 km (500 mi) away in the Sea of Japan. | |

=== Unconfirmed tests ===
American astronomer and astrophysicist Jonathan McDowell claimed that Hwasong-12 was used for two failed tests on 15 October 2016 and 20 October 2016.

== Variants ==
=== Hwasong-8 ===
On the morning of 27 September 2021, a Hwasong-8 missile was launched in Ryongrim County. (Note: Initially reported as Chonchon County.) Reportedly, the missile was fitted with a hypersonic glide vehicle, which would achieve hypersonic speed. Ankit Panda, a senior fellow at the Carnegie Endowment for International Peace, stated that the new missile looked like the booster of Hwasong-12 upon inspection of the sole image of the missile, but more images would be needed to confirm it. This was one of the five 'most important' weapons laid out in a five year plan in the 8th Congress of the Workers' Party of Korea, where the development of the missile was reported to have already been completed. State media of North Korea described it as a weapon of great strategic significance.

The missile apparently flew on a depressed trajectory, reaching an apogee of 30 km (19 mi) and a range of 200 km (120 mi), although it is likely that a part of the missile's path would have been untraceable with radar due to its ability to maneuver. The test reportedly confirmed its navigational control and stability, as well as the guiding manoeuvrability and flight characteristics of the detached hypersonic gliding warhead. However, the missile allegedly failed to actually achieve hypersonic flight, with South Korean intelligence determining it only reached Mach 2.5-3, whereas hypersonic weapons are considered to travel at a speed of at least Mach 5 (1.7 km/s; 6,100 km/h) although actual data on the flight was not publicly released. The South Korea Joint Chiefs of Staff (JCS) assessed that the Hwasong-8 was at an early stage of development and would take a "considerable period of time" until it could be deployed in combat. North Korea also stated that the missile was launched through "ampulization," where the liquid fuel is sealed in the launch canister. This allows the fuel to be stored for years and eliminates the need to conduct fueling before launch, reducing preparation time needed before firing, although the JCS still claimed a 'significant amount of time' was needed to deploy the missile.

=== Hwasong-12A ===
Hwasong-8 has a version fitted with maneuverable reentry vehicle (MaRV). Its official designation may be Hwasong-12A, but it is not confirmed. The missile is also called as Hypersonic Missile Type 2 (극초음속 미사일 2형) under South Korean naming convention.

The MaRV is carried by a shortened Hwasong-12 booster.

It was test-fired two times, on 5 January 2022 and 11 January 2022.

=== October 2022 variant ===
At 07:23 a.m. Pyongyang Standard Time on 4 October 2022, North Korea launched a ballistic missile from Mupyong-ni Arms Factory, Jagang Province. The missile overflew the Japan's Aomori Prefecture, flew for 21 minutes with a maximum speed of Mach 17 (20,800 km/h; 12,900 mph), reached 970 km (600 mi) apogee and landed 4,500 km (2,800 mi) away in the Pacific Ocean, east of Japan. According to the Korean Central News Agency's statement on 10 October 2022, the Kim Jong Un-supervised launch was a part of a missile launch campaign occurred between 25 September and 9 October. The missile, fired to "send more powerful and clear warning to the enemies", was a "new-type ground-to-ground intermediate-range ballistic missile", with the official designation remaining undisclosed.

Photos showed the missile with a different engine configuration and thrust-vector control system, differently shaped and possibly shorter nosecone or reentry vehicle, and possibly slightly longer second stage, so it is unknown if the test was of a "new-type" IRBM or modified Hwasong-12. This version demonstrated the ability to deliver an almost 20% greater payload than previous Hwasong-12 missiles. It is possible that the image of this test was manipulated.

=== Hwasong-12B ===
North Korea displayed several Hwasong-12B missiles at the 27 July 2023 military parade. It is possible that the Hwasong-12B was renamed from Hwasong-8.

The hypersonic glide vehicle of Hwasong-12B is mounted on a shortened Hwasong-12 booster.

== Current operators ==
- North Korea

== Gallery ==
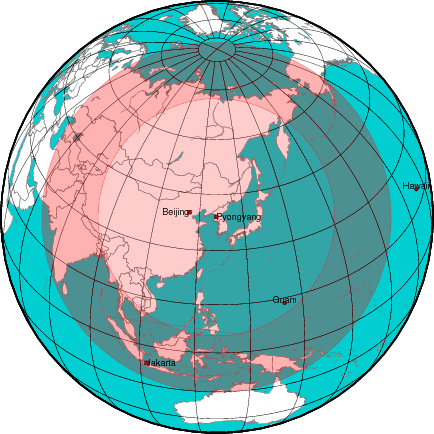
Estimated maximum operational range of the Hwasong-12: from 3,700 km (2,300 mi) (inner circle) to 6,000 km (3,700 mi) (outer circle)

Estimated maximum range of some North Korean missiles, including Hwasong-12

Trajectory of Hwasong-12

North Korean missile launches over Japan
①: Taepodong-1 ②: Unha-2 ③: Unha-3 ④: Kwangmyŏngsŏng (Unha-3) ⑤: Hwasong-12 ⑥: Hwasong-12

== See also ==
- Hwasong-14
- DF-3A
- R-14 Chusovaya
