= Intermediate-range ballistic missile =

Ballistic missile with a range of 3,000–5,500 km

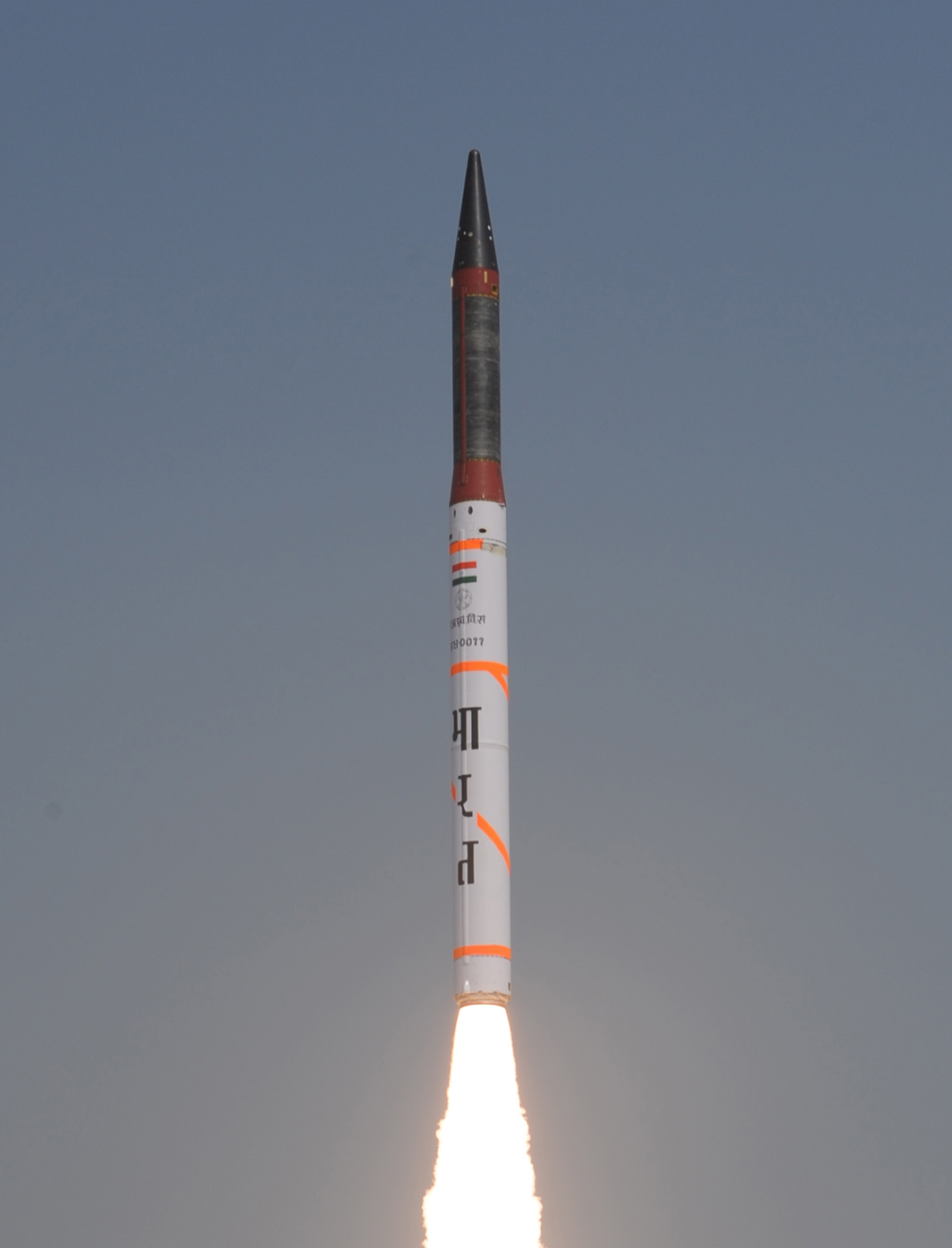
Agni-IV missile being launched from Abdul Kalam Island, Odisha, India

An intermediate-range ballistic missile (IRBM) is a ballistic missile with a range between 3,000 and 5,500 kilometres (1,900–3,400 mi), categorized between a medium-range ballistic missile (MRBM) and an intercontinental ballistic missile (ICBM). Classifying ballistic missiles by range is done mostly for convenience. In principle there is little difference between a high-performance IRBM and a low-performance ICBM, because decreasing payload mass can increase the range over the ICBM threshold. The range definition used here is used within the U.S. Missile Defense Agency.

== History ==
The progenitor for the IRBM was the A4b rocket, winged for increased range and based on the famous V-2, Vergeltung, or "Reprisal", officially called A4, rocket designed by Wernher von Braun. The V-2 was widely used by Nazi Germany at the end of World War II to bomb English and Belgian cities. The A4b was the prototype for the upper stage of the A9/A10 rocket. The goal of the program was to build a missile capable of hitting New York, when launched from France or Spain (see Amerika Bomber).

A4b rockets were tested a few times in December 1944 and January and February 1945. All of these rockets used liquid propellant. The A4b used an inertial guidance system, while the A9 would have been controlled by a pilot. They started from a non-mobile launch pad.

Following World War II, von Braun and other lead Nazi scientists were secretly transferred to the United States, to work directly for the U.S. Army through Operation Paperclip, developing the V-2 into the weapon for the United States.

As of 2026, IRBMs are operated by the People's Republic of China, India, Israel, North Korea, and Russia. The United States, USSR, Pakistan, United Kingdom, and France are former operators.

== Nomenclature ==
There is no clearly agreed-upon distinction between an intermediate-range and a medium range (MRBM) missile, and the categories overlap. Different sources classify missiles in different ways. They are both distinct from ICBMs, in that they have a range that is less than intercontinental, and hence must be based relatively close to the target. An IRBM, in general, is intended as a strategic weapon, while a MRBM, in general, is intended as a theatre ballistic missile.

== Specific IRBMs ==
IRBMs
Date ^{*D}	Model	Range km	Maximum km	Country
1959	PGM-17 Thor	2,400	3,000	United States, United Kingdom
2023	Long-Range Hypersonic Weapon	2,775	3,500	United States
Cancelled	Blue Streak	3,700		United Kingdom
1962	R-14 Chusovaya (SS-5)	3,700		Soviet Union
1970	DF-3A	4,000	5,000	China, Saudi Arabia
1976	RSD-10 Pioneer (SS-20)	5,500		Soviet Union
1980	S3 (missile)	3,500		France
2004	DF-25	3,200	4,000	China
2006	Agni-III	3,500	5,000	India
2007	DF-26	3,500	5,000	China
2007	Shahab-5	4,000	4,300 (not proven)	Iran
2012	Sejjil	2,000	4,000 (three-stage variant)	Iran
2010	Hwasong-10 (Musudan/BM-25)	2,500	4,000 (not proven)	North Korea
2010	K-4	3,500		India
2011	Agni-IV	4,000		India
2017	Hwasong-12 (KN-17)	3,700	6,000	North Korea
2023	Hyunmoo-5	3,000	5,500	South Korea
2024	Hwasong-16B	1,100 (ROK telemetry) 1,500 (DPRK claimed)	5,500	North Korea
2024	Oreshnik	unknown	unknown	Russia
2011	RS-26 Rubezh	unknown	5,800	Russia
1959	R-12 Dvina	2000	2500	Soviet Union

== See also ==
- List of ICBMs
- Short-range ballistic missile (SRBM)
- Submarine-launched ballistic missile (SLBM)
- Anti-ship ballistic missile (ASBM)
- Intermediate-Range Nuclear Forces Treaty
