= Hwasong-10 =

North Korean mobile intermediate-range ballistic missile

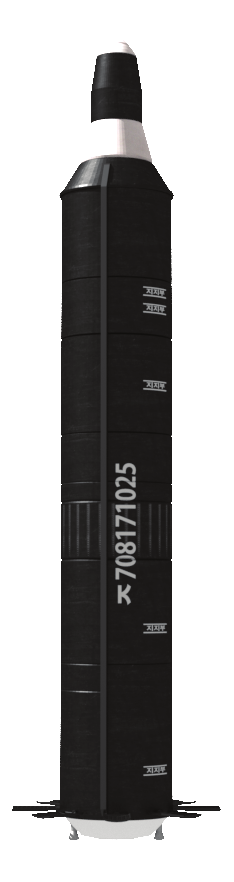
- Artist rendition of the missile
- Type: Intermediate-range ballistic missile
- Place of origin: North Korea

Service history
- In service: Successful test on 22 June 2016
- Used by: Korean People's Army Strategic Force; Iran (possible)

Production history
- Manufacturer: North Korea

Specifications
- Length: 12 m (39 ft)
- Diameter: 1.5 m (4.9 ft)
- Warhead: Conventional; Possibly nuclear
- Warhead weight: 500–1,200 kg (1,100–2,600 lb) (estimated)
- Engine: Liquid-propellant rocket (same or derived from R-27)
- Propellant: UDMH and N_{2}O_{4}
- Operational range: 2,500–4,000 km (1,600–2,500 mi) (estimated)
- Guidance system: Inertial guidance
- Accuracy: 1,600 m (5,200 ft) circular error probable
- Launch platform: MAZ-based transporter erector launcher (TEL)

- Korean name
- Chosŏn'gŭl: 《화성-10》형
- Hancha: 火星十型
- Revised Romanization: Hwaseong-10 hyeong
- McCune–Reischauer: Hwasŏng-10 hyŏng

The Hwasong-10 (Korean: 《화성-10》형; lit. 'Mars Type 10'), also known as Musudan and other names, (Note: See § Naming.) is a mobile intermediate-range ballistic missile (IRBM) developed by North Korea. Based on the R-27 Zyb submarine-launched ballistic missile (SLBM), Hwasong-10 was unveiled in October 2010 during a military parade and was tested several times in 2016, but only the test on 22 June 2016 was successful.

== Description ==
Hwasong-10 is based on a SLBM, likely R-27 Zyb, but is slightly longer. It used a hypergolic combination of unsymmetrical dimethylhydrazine (UDMH) as fuel and nitrogen tetroxide (NTO) as oxidizer, which is similar to the liquid-fueled 4D10 engine of R-27. These propellants are much more advanced than the kerosene compounds used in North Korea's Scud and Hwasong-7 (Nodong) missiles. Once the fuel/oxidizer combination are fed into the missile, it could maintain a 'ready to launch' condition for several days, or even weeks, like the R-27 SLBM, in moderate ambient temperatures. A fueled Hwasong-10 would not have the structural strength to be safely land-transported, so the missile would have to be fueled at the launch site.

It was originally believed that the rocket motors of Hwasong-10 were the same as those within the second stage of the Taepodong-2, which North Korea unsuccessfully test fired in 2006. However analysis of the Unha-3 launch, believed to be based on the Taepodong-2, showed that the second stage did not use the same fuel as the R-27, and is probably based on Hwasong-7 rocket technology.

Before its test flight, it was believed that there was a possibility that the Hwasong-10 would use the Nodong's kerosene and corrosion inhibited red fuming nitric acid (IRFNA) propellants, reducing the missile's range by about half. However, it is unlikely that North Korea uses IRFNA propellants which would reduce its range by about half, after the experts acknowledged that the 22 June 2016 test could have had a range of 3,150 km (1,960 mi) if the missile was not launched in the lofted trajectory.

It was also decided that, as the Korean People's Army's MAZ-547A/MAZ-7916 transporter erector launcher could carry 20 tonnes, and the R-27 Zyb was only 14.2 tonnes, the R-27 Zyb's fuel/oxidizer tank could be extended by approximately 2 m (6.6 ft).

The Hwasong-10's estimated range is 2,500–4,000 km (1,600–2,500 mi). Assuming a range of 3,200 km (2,000 mi), the Hwasong-10 could hit any target in East Asia (including US military bases in Guam and Okinawa). The North Korean inventory of the missile is less than 50 launchers.

The missile has a circular error probable of 1,600 m (5,200 ft) and is capable of carrying a 500–1,200 kg (1,100–2,600 lb) warhead. Warhead can be high-explosive fragmentation, cluster, nuclear or chemical.

=== Naming ===
Hwasong-10 is also known as Musudan (무수단; 舞水端), named after a village near where North Korea test-fires missile. The missile also has several external names, including BM-25, KN-07, Mirim and Nodong-B.

== History ==
In the mid-1990s, after the collapse of the Soviet Union, North Korea invited the Makeyev Design Bureau's ballistic missile designers and engineers to develop this missile, based on the R-27 Zyb. In 1992, a large contract between Korea Yon’gwang Trading Company and Makeyev Rocket Design Bureau of Miass, Russia was signed. The agreement stated that Russian engineers would go to the DPRK and assist in the development of the Zyb Space Launch Vehicle (SLV).

Hwasong-10 was first revealed to the international community at a military parade on 10 October 2010 celebrating the Workers' Party of Korea's 65th anniversary, although experts believe these were mock-ups of the missile.

In April 2013, North Korea was reported to deploy two Hwasong-10 missiles to Wonsan in preparation for a test-fire. Two moblie launchers were reported to continuously moved in and out of a facility. Four to five wheeled vehicles, appear to be TELs, were also spotted to travel around South Hamgyong Province. These actions aimed at making difficult to US and South Korea. A month later, North Korea removed two missiles from launchers.

Since April 2016, the Hwasong-10 has been tested a number of times, with two apparent partial successes and a number of failures. In May 2017, North Korea successfully tested a new missile, the Hwasong-12, with a similar range to the Hwasong-10. It had been displayed in the April 2017 military parade on the Hwasong-10 mobile launcher, and the Hwasong-12 may be intended to replace the Hwasong-10 which has been shown unreliable during its test programme.

In an interview for Difesa Online, a military-focused website, on 27 November 2017, German analyst Norbert Brügge claimed that Hwasong-10, along with Hwasong-13, was likely cancelled due to unresolved engine problems. The Hwasong-10 was not shown in the February 2018 military parade, suggesting that the design had not been deployed. However, in 2020, according to United States intelligence, Hwasong-10 was still classified as deployed.

== List of Hwasong-10 tests ==
=== Confirmed tests ===
Attempt	Date	Location	Pre-launch announcement / detection	Outcome	Additional notes	Reference(s)
1	15 April 2016 5:30 am Pyongyang Standard Time (PST)	Wonsan	South Korea detected one or two Hwasong-10 missile(s) near Wonsan a day before the test.	Failure	Both United States and South Korea "detected and tracked" the missile followed by the confirmation of launch failure. South Korea further claims the missile in this test deviated from a "normal" trajectory. North Korea kept silent on the test despite the day is the 104th anniversary of the birthday of Kim Il Sung.	
2	28 April 2016 6:10 am PST	Northeastern coast	None	Failure	The missile crashed a few seconds after liftoff. North Korea kept silent on the test.	
3	28 April 2016 6:56 pm PST	Wonsan	None	Failure	According to United States sources, the missile went an estimated 200 m (660 ft) off the launchpad. North Korea kept silent on the test.	
4	31 May 2016 5:20 am PST	Wonsan	None	Failure	Missile exploded on site, injuring several soldiers. North Korea also kept silent on the test.	
5	22 June 2016 5:58 am PST	Wonsan	A day before the test, South Korea spotted a Hwasong-10 near east coast.	Success (North Korea); Failure (South Korea and United States	The missile crashed at 150 km (93 mi) away from the site. It is the first successful Hwasong-10 test that safely launched from the launch site, however, the missile still exploded in midair. It is possible that North Korea could have launched the missile at a normal angle, and intentionally terminated its flight early to keep it from overflying Japan at 150 km (93 mi).	
6	22 June 2016 5:58 am PST	Wonsan	A day before the test, South Korea spotted a Hwasong-10 near east coast.	Success (North Korea); Partial success (South Korea and United States)	According to South Korea, US and Japan, the missile achieved 1,000 km (620 mi) apogee, flew 400 km (250 mi) and landed in Sea of Japan. North Korea hailed the twin test on 22 June 2016 as a 'complete success' in the state media. North Korea also stated that the missile accurately landed in the targeted waters 400 km (250 mi) away after flying to the maximum altitude of 1,413.6 km (878.4 mi) along the planned flight orbit. The missile was officially named as Hwasong-10. The missile appears to be intended to fly at a steeper angle than normal to avoid overflying Japanese airspace, rather than a normal trajectory, in which the missile could reach its maximum range of 3,500 km (2,200 mi) or more.	

=== Alleged tests ===
The Iranians conducted an unsuccessful test of the Hwasong-10 on July 11, 2016, with the missile exploding. shortly after liftoff. According to Fox News, the launch site was near Semnan, the extent of North Korea's involvement in the test was unknown, and it was Iran's first test of the missile. Note that two sources – Washington Institute for Near East Policy and Foundation for Defense of Democracies report that this test was actually of Iran's Khorramshahr missile, which was developed from the Hwasong-10.

An alleged, failed test of Hwasong-10 was detected at Kusong on 15 October 2016, at 12:03 pm local time. The US military identified the missile as Hwasong-10, without specifying details. North Korean state media kept silent on this report.

Another alleged launch of Hwasong-10 launch took place on 20 October 2016 at 7:00 am local time, just hours before the start of the final 2016 US presidential election debate, but also failed.

It is possible that the tests in October 2016 involved Hwasong-13 in both KN-08 and KN-14 variants, Hwasong-12, or Pukguksong-2. However, it is difficult to exactly confirm the missile used in these tests, as North Korea did not release images about October 2016 launches.

== Operators ==
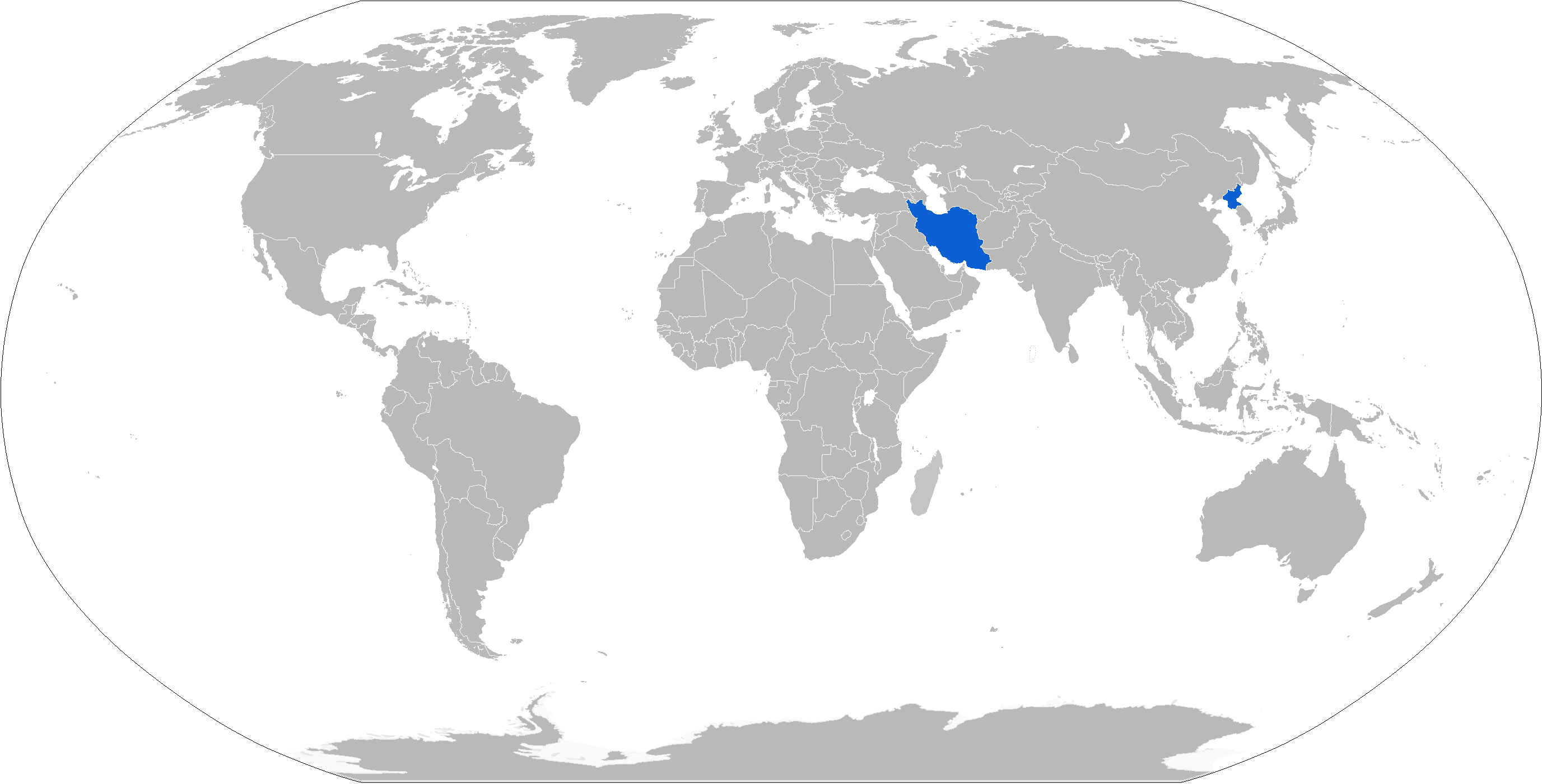
Map with Hwasong-10 operators in blue

=== Current operators ===
- North Korea: According to one source, more than 200; other source claims 12 deployed. 16 were seen at once during the 10 October 2010 military parade, although experts contacted by the Washington Post believed these were mock-ups of the missile. In 2020, according to United States intelligence, North Korea has fewer than 50 Hwasong-10 launchers.

=== Suspected operators ===
- Iran: 19, according to a leaked, classified U.S. State Department cable. The Khorramshahr, which was first publicly displayed on 22 September 2017, is likely derived from Hwasong-10.

== See also ==
- R-27 Zyb
- Pukguksong-1
- JL-1
- Hwasong-12
- Hwasong-13
