= Time in North Korea =

Pyongyang Time
- Time zone
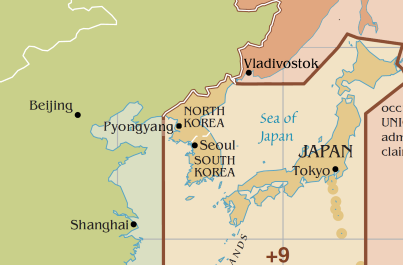
- Map of East Asia with timezones

UTC offset
- PYT: UTC+09:00

Current time
- 05:30, 20 June 2026 PYT [refresh]

Observance of DST
- DST is not observed in this time zone.

- Pyongyang Time
- Chosŏn'gŭl: 평양시간
- Hancha: 平壤時間
- Revised Romanization: Pyeongyang sigan
- McCune–Reischauer: P'yŏngyang sigan

- South Korean name
- Hangul: 북한 표준시
- Hanja: 北韓 標準時
- Revised Romanization: Bukhan pyojunsi
- McCune–Reischauer: Pukhan p'yojunsi

Time in North Korea, called Pyongyang Time (PYT; Korean: 평양시간) or Standard Time of the Democratic People's Republic of Korea (조선민주주의인민공화국 표준시간; 朝鮮民主主義人民共和國標準時間), is since May 2018 equal to Korea Standard Time: 9 hours ahead of UTC (UTC+09:00). Like South Korea, North Korea does not currently observe daylight saving time. Time keeping in North Korea is under the State Commission for Science and Technology.

== History ==
Before modern clocks were introduced into Korea, Koreans kept time with the help of a sundial during the daytime and a water clock at night. In 1434, Chang Yŏngsil, a Joseon scientist and astronomer with other scientists, developed Korea's first sundial, Angbu Ilgu (앙부일구; 仰釜日晷) and was put into service as standard time-keeper of the kingdom and began the standard time at Hanyang (Seoul) which was calculated to be UTC+08:27:52. In 1442, Chiljeongsan, an astronomical calendar system that was created during the reign of King Sejong used Hanyang (Seoul) local time as its standard as it overcame the limitations of previous-made calendars. The Korean Empire adopted a standard time of 8 1/2 hours ahead of UTC (UTC+08:30), which is similar to Pyongyang Standard Time, around the beginning of the 20th century. Some sources claim 1908, others claim 1912 and yet another claims that mean local standard time was used prior to 1908 and that UTC+08:30 was used from 1 April 1908 to 31 December 1911 and again from 21 March 1954 to 9 August 1961. In 1912, the Governor-General of Korea changed the time zone to UTC+09:00 to align with Japan Standard Time.

On 5 August 2015, the North Korean government decided to return to UTC+08:30, effective 15 August 2015, and said the official name would be Pyongyang Time or (PYT). The government of North Korea made this decision as a break from imperialism; the time zone change went into effect on the 70th anniversary of the liberation of Korea. The South Korean government officials worried about inconvenience in Inter-Korean exchange and cooperation, including commuting to and from the Kaesong Industrial Region, and further difference of lifestyle between the North and South Korean people.

On 29 April 2018, North Korean leader Kim Jong Un announced his country would be returning to UTC+09:00 to realign its clocks with South Korea. On 30 April 2018, the Supreme People's Assembly of North Korea issued a decree about changing the time zone in North Korea as a further step in unifying Korea and eliminating differences between the South and North. The time zone change was applied at 23:30 on 4 May 2018 (UTC+08:30).

== IANA time zone database ==
The IANA time zone database contains one zone for North Korea in the file zone.tab, named Asia/Pyongyang.

== See also ==
- Time in South Korea
- Time zone
- UTC+08:30
- UTC+09:00
