= Maryino (rural locality) =

Maryino (Russian: Марьино) is the name of several rural localities in Russia.

== Belgorod Oblast ==
As of 2010, one rural locality in Belgorod Oblast bears this name:

- Maryino, Belgorod Oblast, a khutor in Shebekinsky District

== Ivanovo Oblast ==
As of 2010, three rural localities in Ivanovo Oblast bear this name:

- Maryino, Ilyinsky District, Ivanovo Oblast, a village in Ilyinsky District
- Maryino, Teykovsky District, Ivanovo Oblast, a village in Teykovsky District
- Maryino, Verkhnelandekhovsky District, Ivanovo Oblast, a village in Verkhnelandekhovsky District

== Kaluga Oblast ==
As of 2010, seven rural localities in Kaluga Oblast bear this name:

- Maryino, Kaluga, Kaluga Oblast, a village under the administrative jurisdiction of the City of Kaluga
- Maryino, Borovsky District, Kaluga Oblast, a village in Borovsky District
- Maryino, Kozelsky District, Kaluga Oblast, a village in Kozelsky District
- Maryino, Ulyanovsky District, Kaluga Oblast, a village in Ulyanovsky District
- Maryino, Yukhnovsky District, Kaluga Oblast, a village in Yukhnovsky District
- Maryino (Tarutino Rural Settlement), Zhukovsky District, Kaluga Oblast, a village in Zhukovsky District; municipally, a part of Tarutino Rural Settlement of that district
- Maryino (Vysokinichi Rural Settlement), Zhukovsky District, Kaluga Oblast, a village in Zhukovsky District; municipally, a part of Vysokinichi Rural Settlement of that district

== Kirov Oblast ==
As of 2010, one rural locality in Kirov Oblast bears this name:

- Maryino, Kirov Oblast, a village under the administrative jurisdiction of Oktyabrsky City District of the City of Kirov

== Kostroma Oblast ==
As of 2010, two rural localities in Kostroma Oblast bear this name:

- Maryino, Kadyysky District, Kostroma Oblast, a village in Selishchenskoye Settlement of Kadyysky District
- Maryino, Parfenyevsky District, Kostroma Oblast, a village in Parfenyevskoye Settlement of Parfenyevsky District

== Krasnodar Krai ==
As of 2010, two rural localities in Krasnodar Krai bear this name:

- Maryino, Sochi, Krasnodar Krai, a selo in Kirovsky Rural Okrug under the administrative jurisdiction of the City of Sochi
- Maryino, Uspensky District, Krasnodar Krai, a selo in Volnensky Rural Okrug of Uspensky District

== Kursk Oblast ==
As of 2010, two rural localities in Kursk Oblast bear this name:

- Maryino, Kastorensky District, Kursk Oblast, a selo in Lachinovsky Selsoviet of Kastorensky District
- Maryino, Rylsky District, Kursk Oblast, a settlement in Ivanovsky Selsoviet of Rylsky District

== Leningrad Oblast ==
As of 2010, three rural localities in Leningrad Oblast bear this name:

- Maryino, Gatchinsky District, Leningrad Oblast, a village in Pudomyagskoye Settlement Municipal Formation of Gatchinsky District
- Maryino, Lomonosovsky District, Leningrad Oblast, a village in Nizinskoye Settlement Municipal Formation of Lomonosovsky District
- Maryino, Priozersky District, Leningrad Oblast, a logging depot settlement in Larionovskoye Settlement Municipal Formation of Priozersky District

== Lipetsk Oblast ==
As of 2010, two rural localities in Lipetsk Oblast bear this name:

- Maryino, Krasninsky District, Lipetsk Oblast, a village in Yablonovsky Selsoviet of Krasninsky District
- Maryino, Zadonsky District, Lipetsk Oblast, a village in Kamyshevsky Selsoviet of Zadonsky District

== Mari El Republic ==
As of 2010, one rural locality in the Mari El Republic bears this name:

- Maryino, Mari El Republic, a selo in Maryinsky Rural Okrug of Yurinsky District

== Moscow ==
As of 2010, two rural localities in Moscow bear this name:

- Maryino (settlement), Moscow, a settlement in Filimonkovskoye Settlement of Novomoskovsky Administrative Okrug
- Maryino (village), Moscow, a village in Filimonkovskoye Settlement of Novomoskovsky Administrative Okrug

== Moscow Oblast ==
As of 2010, six rural localities in Moscow Oblast bear this name:

- Maryino, Krasnogorsky District, Moscow Oblast, a village in Otradnenskoye Rural Settlement of Krasnogorsky District
- Maryino, Noginsky District, Moscow Oblast, a village under the administrative jurisdiction of the Town of Elektrougli in Noginsky District
- Maryino, Odintsovsky District, Moscow Oblast, a village in Zakharovskoye Rural Settlement of Odintsovsky District
- Maryino, Ruzsky District, Moscow Oblast, a village in Dorokhovskoye Rural Settlement of Ruzsky District
- Maryino, Sergiyevo-Posadsky District, Moscow Oblast, a village in Shemetovskoye Rural Settlement of Sergiyevo-Posadsky District
- Maryino, Solnechnogorsky District, Moscow Oblast, a village in Sokolovskoye Rural Settlement of Solnechnogorsky District

== Nizhny Novgorod Oblast ==
As of 2010, three rural localities in Nizhny Novgorod Oblast bear this name:

- Maryino, Buturlinsky District, Nizhny Novgorod Oblast, a selo in Bolshebakaldsky Selsoviet of Buturlinsky District
- Maryino, Voskresensky District, Nizhny Novgorod Oblast, a village in Nakhratovsky Selsoviet of Voskresensky District
- Maryino, Voznesensky District, Nizhny Novgorod Oblast, a village in Butakovsky Selsoviet of Voznesensky District

== Novgorod Oblast ==
As of 2010, one rural locality in Novgorod Oblast bears this name:

- Maryino, Novgorod Oblast, a village in Uspenskoye Settlement of Chudovsky District

== Oryol Oblast ==
As of 2010, one rural locality in Oryol Oblast bears this name:

- Maryino, Oryol Oblast, a village in Kudinovsky Selsoviet of Dolzhansky District

== Pskov Oblast ==
As of 2010, nine rural localities in Pskov Oblast bear this name:

- Maryino, Gdovsky District, Pskov Oblast, a village in Gdovsky District
- Maryino, Loknyansky District, Pskov Oblast, a village in Loknyansky District
- Maryino, Nevelsky District, Pskov Oblast, a village in Nevelsky District
- Maryino, Novorzhevsky District, Pskov Oblast, a village in Novorzhevsky District
- Maryino, Novosokolnichesky District, Pskov Oblast, a village in Novosokolnichesky District
- Maryino, Opochetsky District, Pskov Oblast, a village in Opochetsky District
- Maryino, Ostrovsky District, Pskov Oblast, a village in Ostrovsky District
- Maryino, Strugo-Krasnensky District, Pskov Oblast, a village in Strugo-Krasnensky District
- Maryino, Velikoluksky District, Pskov Oblast, a village in Velikoluksky District

== Ryazan Oblast ==
As of 2010, four rural localities in Ryazan Oblast bear this name:

- Maryino, Mikhaylovsky District, Ryazan Oblast, a village in Mishinsky Rural Okrug of Mikhaylovsky District
- Maryino, Ryazhsky District, Ryazan Oblast, a village in Vvedenovsky Rural Okrug of Ryazhsky District
- Maryino, Kazache-Dyukovsky Rural Okrug, Shatsky District, Ryazan Oblast, a village in Kazache-Dyukovsky Rural Okrug of Shatsky District
- Maryino, Zhelannovsky Rural Okrug, Shatsky District, Ryazan Oblast, a village in Zhelannovsky Rural Okrug of Shatsky District

== Saratov Oblast ==
As of 2010, two rural localities in Saratov Oblast bear this name:

- Maryino, Bazarno-Karabulaksky District, Saratov Oblast, a selo in Bazarno-Karabulaksky District
- Maryino, Turkovsky District, Saratov Oblast, a selo in Turkovsky District

== Smolensk Oblast ==
As of 2010, eleven rural localities in Smolensk Oblast bear this name:

- Maryino, Dobrominskoye Rural Settlement, Glinkovsky District, Smolensk Oblast, a village in Dobrominskoye Rural Settlement of Glinkovsky District
- Maryino, Glinkovskoye Rural Settlement, Glinkovsky District, Smolensk Oblast, a village in Glinkovskoye Rural Settlement of Glinkovsky District
- Maryino, Novoduginsky District, Smolensk Oblast, a village in Izvekovskoye Rural Settlement of Novoduginsky District
- Maryino, Pochinkovsky District, Smolensk Oblast, a village in Klimshchinskoye Rural Settlement of Pochinkovsky District
- Maryino, Pushkinskoye Rural Settlement, Safonovsky District, Smolensk Oblast, a village in Pushkinskoye Rural Settlement of Safonovsky District
- Maryino, Zimnitskoye Rural Settlement, Safonovsky District, Smolensk Oblast, a village in Zimnitskoye Rural Settlement of Safonovsky District
- Maryino, Khokhlovskoye Rural Settlement, Smolensky District, Smolensk Oblast, a village in Khokhlovskoye Rural Settlement of Smolensky District
- Maryino, Sychyovsky District, Smolensk Oblast, a village in Sutorminskoye Rural Settlement of Sychyovsky District
- Maryino, Khmelitskoye Rural Settlement, Vyazemsky District, Smolensk Oblast, a village in Khmelitskoye Rural Settlement of Vyazemsky District
- Maryino, Maslovskoye Rural Settlement, Vyazemsky District, Smolensk Oblast, a village in Maslovskoye Rural Settlement of Vyazemsky District
- Maryino, Yelninsky District, Smolensk Oblast, a village in Mazovskoye Rural Settlement of Yelninsky District

== Tambov Oblast ==
As of 2010, three rural localities in Tambov Oblast bear this name:

- Maryino, Michurinsky District, Tambov Oblast, a village in Tersky Selsoviet of Michurinsky District
- Maryino, Nikiforovsky District, Tambov Oblast, a village in Ozersky Selsoviet of Nikiforovsky District
- Maryino, Zherdevsky District, Tambov Oblast, a village in Alexeyevsky Selsoviet of Zherdevsky District

== Republic of Tatarstan ==
As of 2010, one rural locality in the Republic of Tatarstan bears this name:

- Maryino, Republic of Tatarstan, a village in Apastovsky District

== Tula Oblast ==
As of 2010, six rural localities in Tula Oblast bear this name:

- Maryino, Dubensky District, Tula Oblast, a village in Nadezhdinsky Rural Okrug of Dubensky District
- Maryino, Kamensky District, Tula Oblast, a village in Kamensky Rural Okrug of Kamensky District
- Maryino, Kireyevsky District, Tula Oblast, a village in Bolshekalmyksky Rural Okrug of Kireyevsky District
- Maryino, Leninsky District, Tula Oblast, a village in Bezhkovsky Rural Okrug of Leninsky District
- Maryino, Tyoplo-Ogaryovsky District, Tula Oblast, a village in Gorkovsky Rural Okrug of Tyoplo-Ogaryovsky District
- Maryino, Yefremovsky District, Tula Oblast, a village in Mordovsky Rural Okrug of Yefremovsky District

== Tver Oblast ==
As of 2010, sixteen rural localities in Tver Oblast bear this name:

- Maryino, Andreapolsky District, Tver Oblast, a village in Khotilitskoye Rural Settlement of Andreapolsky District
- Maryino, Belsky District, Tver Oblast, a village in Kavelshchinskoye Rural Settlement of Belsky District
- Maryino, Kablukovskoye Rural Settlement, Kalininsky District, Tver Oblast, a village in Kablukovskoye Rural Settlement of Kalininsky District
- Maryino, Shcherbininskoye Rural Settlement, Kalininsky District, Tver Oblast, a village in Shcherbininskoye Rural Settlement of Kalininsky District
- Maryino, Slavnovskoye Rural Settlement, Kalininsky District, Tver Oblast, a village in Slavnovskoye Rural Settlement of Kalininsky District
- Maryino, Verkhnevolzhskoye Rural Settlement, Kalininsky District, Tver Oblast, a village in Verkhnevolzhskoye Rural Settlement of Kalininsky District
- Maryino, Kesovogorsky District, Tver Oblast, a village in Strelikhinskoye Rural Settlement of Kesovogorsky District
- Maryino, Konakovsky District, Tver Oblast, a village in Selikhovskoye Rural Settlement of Konakovsky District
- Maryino, Baranovskoye Rural Settlement, Likhoslavlsky District, Tver Oblast, a village in Baranovskoye Rural Settlement of Likhoslavlsky District
- Maryino, Stanskoye Rural Settlement, Likhoslavlsky District, Tver Oblast, a village in Stanskoye Rural Settlement of Likhoslavlsky District
- Maryino, Nelidovsky District, Tver Oblast, a village in Novoselkovskoye Rural Settlement of Nelidovsky District
- Maryino, Ostashkovsky District, Tver Oblast, a village in Sorozhskoye Rural Settlement of Ostashkovsky District
- Maryino, Rameshkovsky District, Tver Oblast, a village in Kiverichi Rural Settlement of Rameshkovsky District
- Maryino, Sonkovsky District, Tver Oblast, a village in Koyskoye Rural Settlement of Sonkovsky District
- Maryino, Torzhoksky District, Tver Oblast, a selo in Maryinskoye Rural Settlement of Torzhoksky District
- Maryino, Udomelsky District, Tver Oblast, a village in Zarechenskoye Rural Settlement of Udomelsky District

== Vladimir Oblast ==
As of 2010, three rural localities in Vladimir Oblast bear this name:

- Maryino, Kolchuginsky District, Vladimir Oblast, a village in Kolchuginsky District
- Maryino, Kovrovsky District, Vladimir Oblast, a selo in Kovrovsky District
- Maryino, Vyaznikovsky District, Vladimir Oblast, a village in Vyaznikovsky District

== Vologda Oblast ==
As of 2010, four rural localities in Vologda Oblast bear this name:

- Maryino, Chagodoshchensky District, Vologda Oblast, a village in Belokrestsky Selsoviet of Chagodoshchensky District
- Maryino, Sizemsky Selsoviet, Sheksninsky District, Vologda Oblast, a village in Sizemsky Selsoviet of Sheksninsky District
- Maryino, Yurochensky Selsoviet, Sheksninsky District, Vologda Oblast, a village in Yurochensky Selsoviet of Sheksninsky District
- Maryino, Vologodsky District, Vologda Oblast, a village in Veprevsky Selsoviet of Vologodsky District

== Yaroslavl Oblast ==
As of 2010, ten rural localities in Yaroslavl Oblast bear this name:

- Maryino, Bolsheselsky District, Yaroslavl Oblast, a village in Varegovsky Rural Okrug of Bolsheselsky District
- Maryino, Semivragovsky Rural Okrug, Danilovsky District, Yaroslavl Oblast, a village in Semivragovsky Rural Okrug of Danilovsky District
- Maryino, Seredskoy Rural Okrug, Danilovsky District, Yaroslavl Oblast, a village in Seredskoy Rural Okrug of Danilovsky District
- Maryino, Bogorodsky Rural Okrug, Myshkinsky District, Yaroslavl Oblast, a village in Bogorodsky Rural Okrug of Myshkinsky District
- Maryino, Povodnevsky Rural Okrug, Myshkinsky District, Yaroslavl Oblast, a village in Povodnevsky Rural Okrug of Myshkinsky District
- Maryino, Latskovsky Rural Okrug, Nekouzsky District, Yaroslavl Oblast, a village in Latskovsky Rural Okrug of Nekouzsky District
- Maryino, Vereteysky Rural Okrug, Nekouzsky District, Yaroslavl Oblast, a selo in Vereteysky Rural Okrug of Nekouzsky District
- Maryino, Pervomaysky District, Yaroslavl Oblast, a village in Ignattsevsky Rural Okrug of Pervomaysky District
- Maryino, Uglichsky District, Yaroslavl Oblast, a village in Slobodskoy Rural Okrug of Uglichsky District
- Maryino, Yaroslavsky District, Yaroslavl Oblast, a village in Shirinsky Rural Okrug of Yaroslavsky District
