= Kim Yong Bok =

North Korean general (fl. 21st century)

- Kim Yong Bok in 2020
- Born: 27 July 1957 (age 69)
- Military career
- Allegiance: North Korea
- Branch: Korean People's Army
- Rank: Sangjang (colonel general)
- Unit: XI Corps
- Commands: Special Operations Forces
- Conflicts: Russo-Ukrainian war; Kursk offensive

Korean name
- Hangul: 김용복
- Hanja: 金勇福
- RR: Gim Yongbok
- MR: Kim Yongbok

Kim Yong Bok (Korean: 김영복, born 27 July 1957) is a North Korean colonel general in command of Korean People's Army Special Operations Forces, and a member of the seventh and eighth Central Committees of the Workers' Party of Korea. He is currently known as the Deputy Chief of the General Staff Department of the Korean People's Army and is closely affiliated with North Korean leader Kim Jong Un, having appeared alongside him at multiple military and ceremonial events. He commands key special forces units, including the XI Corps, also known as the "Storm Corps" (폭풍군단), and is believed to lead North Korea's light infantry and reconnaissance deployment operations abroad.

== Career ==
=== Military career ===
Not much is known on Kim Yong Bok's background and career. According to the South Korean government's database of North Korean elites, which contains information on more than 680 officials based on intelligence and publicly available information, only his name and position are listed. His age, place of birth, and other biographical details are unknown. It is unusual for senior North Korean military officials, about whom more information is usually available under South Korea's National Intelligence Service (NIS). However, the United States's Office of Foreign Assets Control has suggested a birth date of 27 July 1957.

In April 2017, Kim was promoted from Chungjang (lieutenant general) to Sangjang (colonel general). Also, he was appointed as the commander of the Special Operations Forces from the commander of the XI Corps during the commemoration of the 105th anniversary of Kim Il Sung's birthday, having previously mentioned by Korean Central Television at the same event. The Special Forces unit under his command is considered one of the largest in the world, with about an estimated 200,000 personnel according to The Wall Street Journal. In July 2020, his status in the military hierarchy became more evident when, during a ceremony to award the DPRK's top generals with commemorative Baektu pistols (named after the sacred mountain Baektusan), Kim Yong Bok was in close proximity to the country's leader Kim Jong Un.

In March 2024, his current position as the third person in the hierarchy of the Korean People's Army and Deputy Chief of General Staff was made public.

Following Russian president Vladimir Putin's visit to Pyongyang in June 2024, when Russia and North Korea signed a mutual defense pact, Kim Yong Bok began making frequent public appearances with Kim Jong Un. He appeared in at least seven public events alongside Kim Jong Un in 2024 in North Korean state media, including elite special forces training and artillery exercises, noting his position within the North Korean leadership and his trusted status in sensitive military operations. He once accompanied Kim Jong Un to jointly visit flood-affected areas in the aftermath of Typhoon Gaemi's landfall. He is widely regarded as an instrument of regime control and power projection, not only within the KPA but also in representing Pyongyang's strategic interests abroad.

As of August 2025, state media refers to Kim Yong Bok as the first vice-chief of General Staff of the Korean People's Army.

==== Russo-Ukrainian war ====
On 29 October 2024, South Korea's National Intelligence Service (NIS) reported that Kim Yong Bok was leading an advance unit of North Korean troops stationed in Russia, reportedly moving toward the front lines. According to the NIS, this deployment is believed to be connected with North Korea's involvement in the ongoing Russian war against Ukraine, specifically related to missile cooperation involving the Hwasong-11A, a North Korean short-range ballistic missile modeled on Russia's Iskander system. The intelligence suggested that Kim's unit might be deployed near Kursk. While the South Korean military remained cautious about the size and operational role of the contingent, Kim Yong Bok was described as leading what appeared to be a forward deployment or reconnaissance party. The troops under his command were mostly in their early 20s, with some reportedly still in their late teens, according to the NIS. Despite their youth, they had completed basic combat training and were assessed as possessing significant combat capability.

On 20 November 2024, the Ukrainian government reportedly identified Kim Yong Bok as a central figure in the controversial deployment of North Korean troops to Russia amid the ongoing Russo-Ukrainian war. Ukrainian authorities named him among three top North Korean generals confirmed to be in Russia, part of a broader deployment of an estimated 4,000 to 5,000 KPA personnel, including at least 500 officers. Kim reportedly led an advance party tasked with preparing for the integration of KPA troops into Russian military formations, a move aimed at concealing their foreign presence. The troops were expected to be organized into five brigades of 2,000–3,000 men each. It is reported that he oversee the Korean People's Army's (KPA) Light Infantry Training Guidance Bureau, a specialised command structure that includes the XI Corps (commonly known as the Storm Corps), various light infantry brigades attached to other corps-level units, and specialized forces seconded to the Reconnaissance General Bureau (RGB), North Korea's main military intelligence agency. According to North Korea analyst Michael Madden of the Stimson Center, Kim has been dispatched to Russia as a representative of Kim Jong Un, serving as a proxy commander and liaison with Russian forces during the initial phase of deployment. Kim Yong Bok's tasks reportedly include integrating North Korean troops with Russian ones, gaining combat experience for future use in the DPRK, and organizing logistics for future contingents. Once North Korean military units are fully established and integrated into operations, Kim is expected to transfer field-level command responsibilities to a senior subordinate officer, such as a colonel or major general.

Two days later, on 22 November 2024, he was reportedly present during a Ukrainian missile strike on the Maryino estate in Russia's Kursk oblast, where North Korean generals were allegedly coordinating with Russian forces. According to The Wall Street Journal, citing anonymous Western officials, a North Korean general was wounded in the attack, though the identity and condition of the individual were not officially disclosed. Ukrainian and South Korean officials had previously identified Kim Yong Bok as the senior general sent by Pyongyang to supervise coordination with Russian military units. The estate, targeted with UK-supplied Storm Shadow missiles, was said to serve as a Russian army command and communications hub, and its destruction marked a significant escalation in cross-border military activity. This incident further reflects the expanding scale of North Korea's reported deployment of up to 10,000 troops to Russia in exchange for military equipment, including air defense missiles, as revealed by South Korean National Security Adviser Shin Won-sik.

On 17 December 2024, the South Korean government imposed independent sanctions on Kim Yong Bok, along with fellow generals Sin Kum-chol and Ri Song-jin, for their involvement in North Korea's military cooperation with Russia during the ongoing Russo-Ukrainian war. The South Korean Ministry of Foreign Affairs designated these individuals, among 11 people and 15 entities, as targets for unilateral sanctions due to violations of multiple United Nations Security Council (UNSC) resolutions and their roles in supporting North Korea's nuclear and missile programs. These measures followed a joint statement by the foreign ministers of South Korea, the United States, Japan, and allied countries condemning the arms trade and strategic alignment between Pyongyang and Moscow. Under the sanctions, any financial or foreign exchange transactions involving him now require prior approval from the Financial Services Commission or Bank of Korea, with violations subject to legal penalties under South Korean law. The United Kingdom also set sanctions on Kim as one of the 107 sanctions list against companies and individuals involved in the Russo-Ukrainian war.

On 9 May 2025, during Russia's that year's Victory Day celebrations, Russian president Vladimir Putin met with a delegation of North Korean military officials in Moscow's Red Square. Kim Yong Bok, who was the first to greet the president, became the delegation leader. During the ceremony, Putin shook hands with him and remarked, "Thank you very much to all your fighters, your heroes. Best wishes." In response, Kim conveyed his congratulations on the Victory Day celebrations. This response was then followed by an open embrace by Putin. Other delegations include, Ri Chang Ho, head of the Reconnaissance General Bureau, and Sin Kum Chol, director of the General Staff's Operations Bureau. These officials are under sanctions by South Korea, the United States, and the European Union for their roles in North Korea's military cooperation with Russia.

=== Political career ===
In 2016, Kim Yong Bok was elected to the 7th Central Committee of the Workers' Party of Korea. He served as a member of the State Funeral Committee at the time of Kim Yong-chun's death in August 2018. He was re-elected to the 8th Central Committee in 2021.

At the 11th Plenary Meeting of the 8th Central Committee of the Workers' Party of Korea, held between 23 and 27 December 2024, he was by-elected as a candidate member of the Central Committee of the WPK. His appointment held the rising prominence of senior military officials involved in North Korea's foreign military deployments, particularly in relation to the country's support for Russia during the Russo-Ukrainian war.

In February 2026, Kim was elected to 9th Central Committee of the Workers' Party of Korea as a full member.
