= Maryino =

Maryino or Maryine may refer to:

- Maryino District, a district of the federal city of Moscow, Russia
- Maryino (rural locality), several rural localities in Russia
- Maryino (Moscow Metro), a station on the Lyublinskaya Line of Moscow Metro, Moscow, Russia
- Maryino Estate, an aristocratic estate in Leningrad Oblast
- Maryino Estate, Kursk Oblast, an aristocratic estate in Kursk Oblast, Russia
- Maryine, Sumy Oblast, a village in Sumy Oblast, Ukraine

== See also ==
- Marino (disambiguation)
