= Iraq–North Korea relations =

Bilateral relations between the Republic Of Iraq and DPR Korea

- North Korea: Iraq

Iraq–North Korea relations (Korean: 이라크-조선민주주의인민공화국 관계, Arabic: العلاقات بين العراق وكوريا الشمالية) are relations between North Korea and Iraq. The two states are part of what is called the "Axis of Evil", countries presented by the George W. Bush administration as wishing to obtain weapons of mass destruction and supporting terrorism, along with Iran. Iraq was removed from the U.S. State Sponsors of Terrorism list in 2004.

== History ==
=== 1968–2003: military cooperation ===
Formal relations between the two countries were established in 1968 after Saddam Hussein came to power in Iraq. They were initially marked by a cordial understanding before they deteriorated sharply and were formally broken in 1980 due to the Iran–Iraq War, North Korea preferred to support its Iranian ally by providing it in particular with T-54/T-55 tanks, Anti-aircraft warfare batteries, Koksan self-propelled guns and Scud missiles. Many of these copies will be captured by the Iraqi Army during the conflict.

Despite this, new negotiations were undertaken in 1999, establishing Iraqi-North Korean cooperation until 2002. Iraq would in fact have paid 10 million dollars to acquire North Korean Rodong-1 medium-range ballistic missiles according to the Central Intelligence Agency. In addition, in 2001, an American report affirms that Iraq and North Korean engineers would have jointly built a missile factory in Sudan. Still according to the same source, the Iraqis would have invested 400 million dollars for this construction project, funds obtained through petroleum exports. North Korea also reportedly provided Scud missiles to Iraq, two dozen while the Iraqi ballistic program was largely neutralized during Operation Desert Storm during the Gulf War in 1991.

=== The overthrow of Saddam Hussein ===
Since 2004, when the U.S. invasion of Iraq saw the overthrow of Saddam Hussein and the establishment of a new Iraqi government, diplomatic relations have still not been restored between the two countries. The rapid fall of the Iraqi regime has also convinced North Korea of the need to possess nuclear weapons.

On 21 September 2012, in the context of the Syrian civil war, Iraq refused a North Korean plane carrying weapons destined for the Syrian Army to pass through its airspace.

== See also ==
- Foreign relations of Iraq
- Foreign relations of North Korea
