= North Korean involvement in the Russo-Ukrainian war (2022–present) =

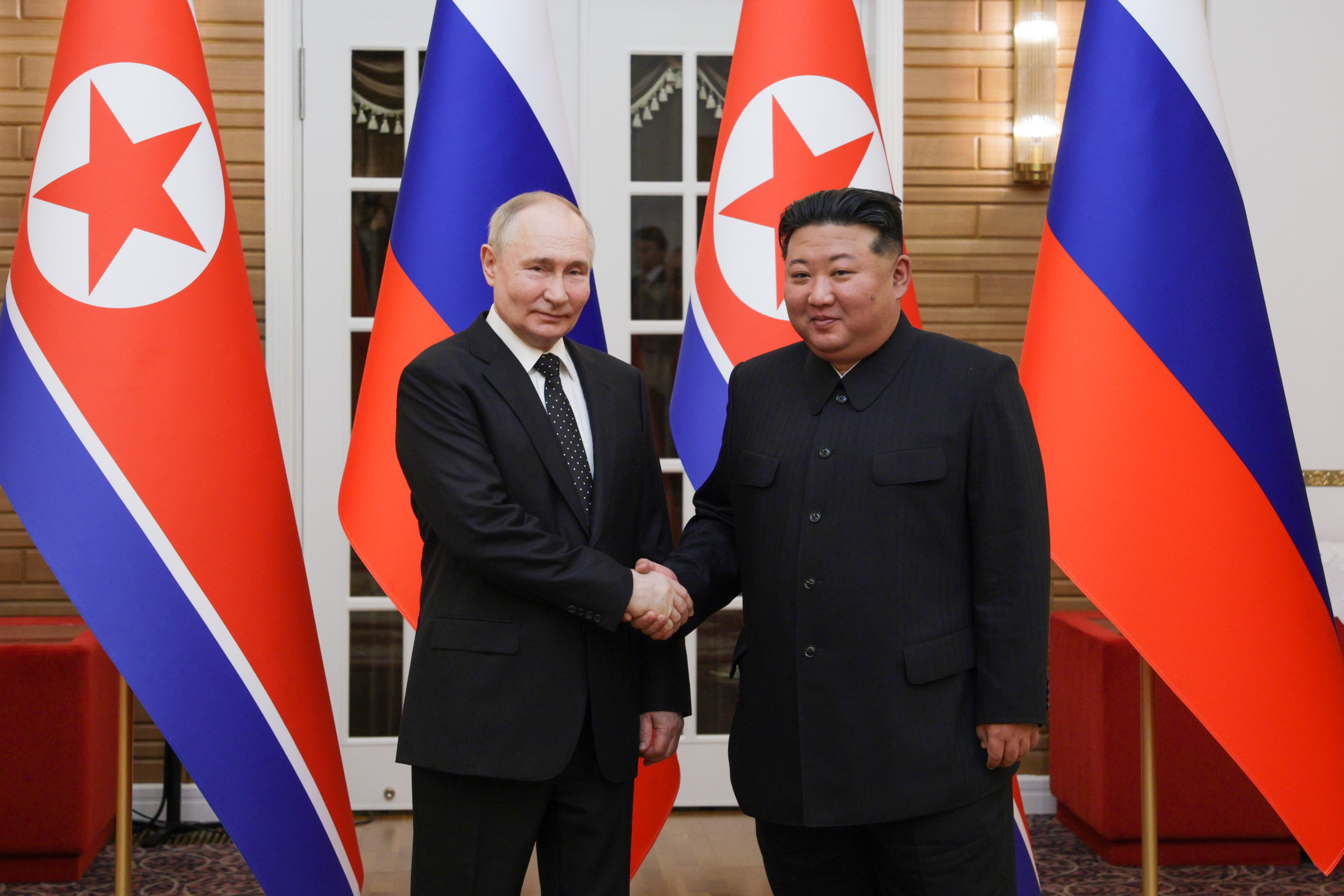
Russian President Vladimir Putin (left) and North Korean leader Kim Jong Un (right) at Government Complex No. 1 in Pyongyang during the North Korea–Russia summit in June 2024

North Korea has supported Russia in the Russo-Ukrainian war since 2017, when it recognized the 2014 Russian annexation of Crimea. In July 2022, North Korea recognized the Russia-backed, self-proclaimed Donetsk and Luhansk People's Republics, prompting Ukraine to sever diplomatic ties with North Korea.

Since 2023, North Korea has supplied Russia with materiel, primarily artillery and missiles. Supplied materiel is estimated at millions of artillery shells worth several billions of dollars, over a hundred Hwasong-11A and Hwasong-11B short-range ballistic missiles, and smaller numbers of M-1989 Koksan self-propelled howitzers and other shorter-range missiles. From the summer of 2023 to the end of 2025, arms sales to Russia generated more than US$10 billion for North Korea, significantly improving North Korea's economy.

From October 2024, North Korea sent Korean People's Army personnel to Russia to fight against Ukrainian forces in the Kursk campaign inside Russia, in Russian uniforms and under Russian command. The North Korean forces deployed to Russia, estimated at 16,000 to 22,000 troops, are believed to be primarily from the Korean People's Army Special Operations Forces. The first clashes with Ukrainian troops occurred in early November, and by mid-January Western officials estimated their casualties at 4,000 and deaths at 1,000. Postulated motives for North Korea's involvement include Russian supplies of rice, technology for the North Korean space program, and other assistance countering sanctions against North Korea, and to gain combat experience for its soldiers. Suggested Russian motives include addressing a shortage of labor in construction, factories, and in troop counts, and preventing a full-scale mobilization.

== Diplomatic support for Russia ==
North Korea has repeatedly sided with Russia diplomatically during the Russo-Ukrainian war. The country officially recognized Crimea as part of Russia as early as 2017, thereby supporting Moscow's position at the international level. With the escalation of the conflict and the start of the Russian invasion of Ukraine, North Korea continued its support for Russia. In July 2022, North Korea recognized the independence of the self-proclaimed Donetsk and Luhansk People's Republics, supported by Russia. This decision immediately led to the severance of diplomatic relations between Ukraine and North Korea. Ukraine condemned North Korea's recognition of the separatist territories as a serious breach of international law and an undermining of the country's territorial integrity. In an official statement, the Ukrainian Foreign Ministry said that North Korea's decision had no legal relevance.

Relations between Ukraine and North Korea were almost non-existent even before these events. International sanctions against North Korea had prevented any form of cooperation. The official diplomatic break in 2022 was therefore more symbolic than substantive.

== Arms deliveries to Russia ==
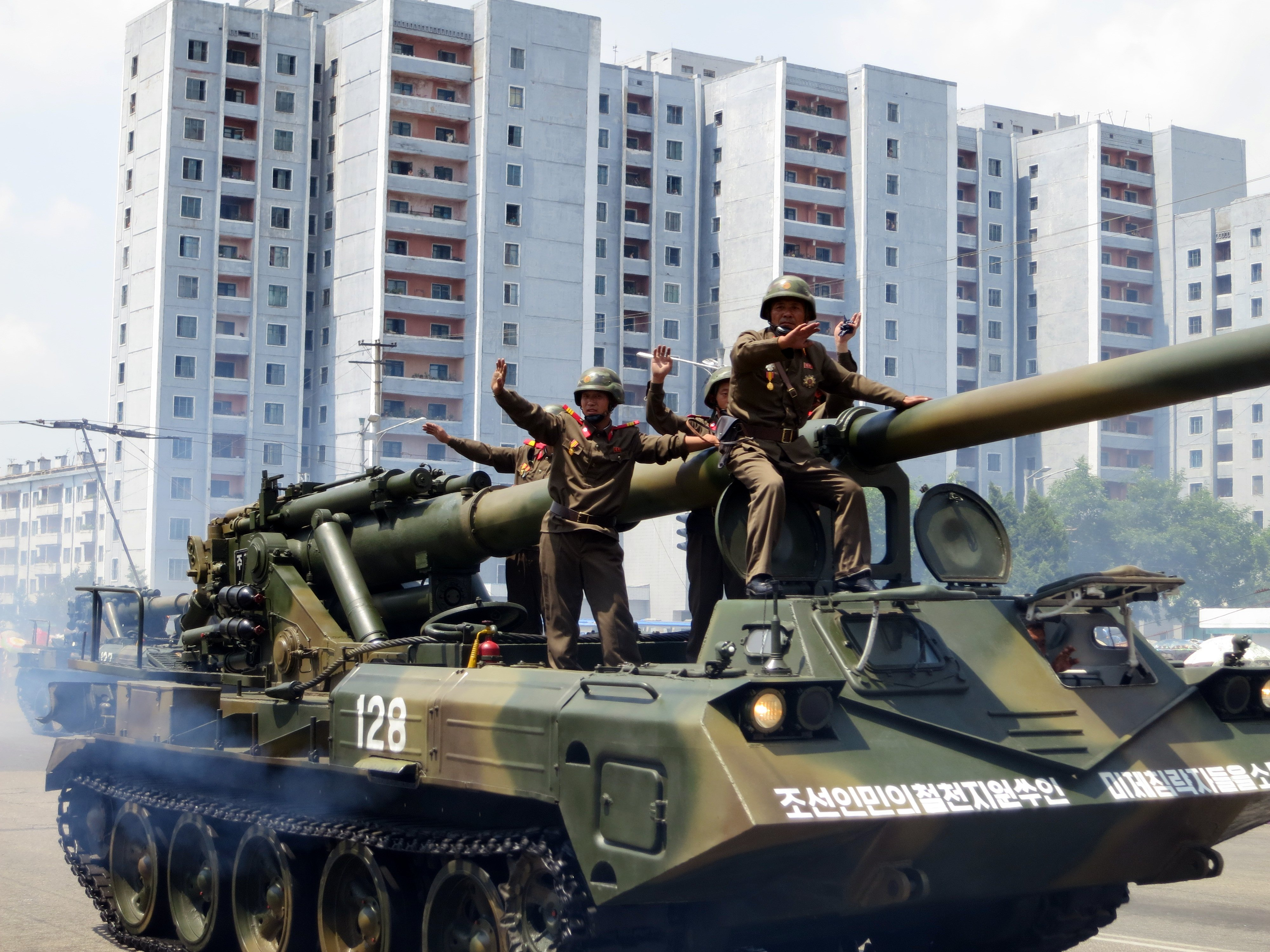
North Korea's M-1989 Koksan howitzer, a long-range artillery weapon supplied to Russia to bolster its artillery capabilities in its invasion of Ukraine.

North Korea has supported Russia with artillery ammunition, initially drawing on old stocks. These deliveries could explain the high failure rate of up to 50% in the use of this ammunition documented by Ukraine. At the same time, North Korea has had its arms industry running at full speed, and it is estimated that it is able to produce up to two million artillery shells annually (as of 2024), making a significant contribution to Russia's warfare.

In mid-November 2024, almost 50 North Korean–made M-1989 Koksan self-propelled howitzers and around 20 M-1991 short-range missile systems were delivered to Russia to reinforce the Russian armed forces in the conflict with Ukraine.

In an interview with The Korea Herald, Wi Sung-lac, the former South Korean ambassador to Russia, stated that North Korea's participation in the war against Ukraine was beneficial to North Korea. According to Wi, Russia's support of North Korea helps ease economic problems such as the financial and food crises, as Moscow pays compensation. According to South Korean intelligence, the sale of several containers of artillery shells could enable North Korea to purchase hundreds of thousands of tons of rice. Officials also reported that Russia may be helping North Korea develop space technology. The Council on Foreign Relations reported in November 2025 that North Korea had supplied Russia with a total of 12 million artillery shells by July 2025. Open Source Centre, a British think tank, reported from satellite imagery that between September 2023 and April 2025, North Korea supplied 15,000 containers containing around 4 million shells, potentially worth "several billions of dollars".

In April 2025, Ukraine's Main Directorate of Intelligence claimed that North Korea had supplied Russia with 148 Hwasong-11A and Hwasong-11B short-range ballistic missiles up until the start of 2025. Ukrainian sources claimed the missiles carry up to one-ton warheads, heavier than their Russian equivalents, and that missile debris had been discovered in an attack on Kyiv. According to Ukrainian intelligence, North Korea was supplying as much as 50% of 122 mm and 152 mm ammunition needs of Russia by the end of 2025. In August 2026, Ukrainian intelligence claimed that Russia had received a new batch of 50 ballistic missiles from North Korea as of July 2026. Among them were missiles of a new type, called Hwasong-11C.

From the summer of 2023 to the end of 2025, arms sales to Russia generated more than US$10 billion for North Korea. In comparison, North Korea's GDP was estimated to be about $27 billion. The arms sales had an effect of significantly improving North Korea's economy. Bloomberg News estimated in 2026 that various deals with Russia had generated US$14 billion for North Korea from 2022 to 2025, with 90% of that coming from arms sales.

== Deployment of North Korean soldiers to Russia ==
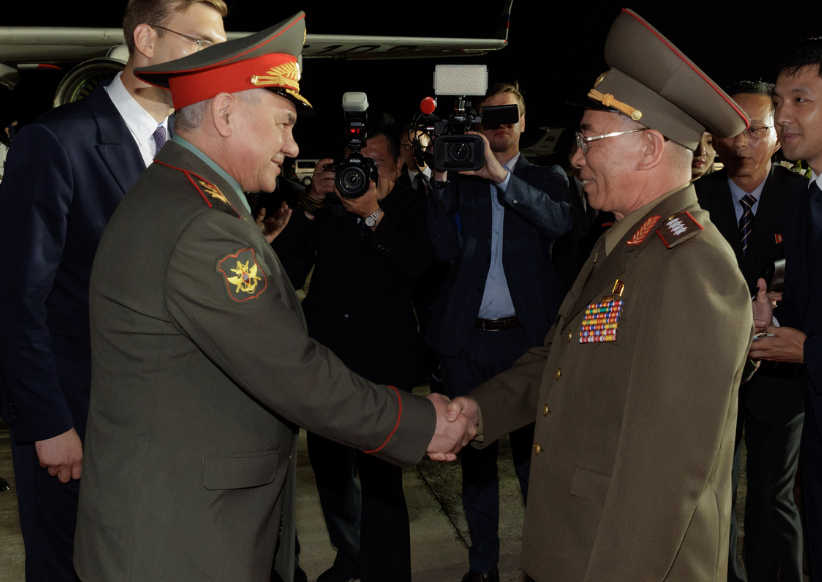
Russian minister of defense Sergei Shoigu meeting with North Korean minister of defense Kang Sun-nam on 25 July 2023

=== Initial reports ===
In October 2024, multiple sources reported that North Korean soldiers were undergoing training in eastern Russia. The South Korean National Intelligence Service (NIS) stated that around 1,500 soldiers had been sent for military training, possibly for deployment in Ukraine. In October 2024, NATO claimed that it had evidence that North Korean soldiers had been sent to Russia. Ukrainian military intelligence, claimed that the first North Korean soldiers arrived in Russia's Kursk Oblast on 25 October 2024. On 28 April 2025, North Korea confirmed that they had sent troops to Russia.

=== Force size and nature ===
According to estimates in 2024, North Korea reportedly sent around 12,000 Korean People's Army (KPA) troops, including special forces, to support Russia, including around 500 officers and 3 generals. According to South Korean estimates and the Center for Strategic and International Studies in 2026, North Korea sent 16,000 and 22,000 troops in return for around $2,000 per month each. The Council of Foreign Relations assessed that the majority of were from the KPA's Special Operations Forces; other sources also assessed they were from an elite unit. Ukrainian reports mention the presence of special forces soldiers under the Reconnaissance General Bureau were also sent to Kursk.

Nevertheless, the quality of the North Korean troops preparing for deployment in the war in Ukraine has been viewed critically. Ants Kiviselg, the commander of the Estonian Defense Ministry's intelligence center, stated that North Korean soldiers are usually trained to fight in mountainous terrain and have no experience operating in Ukraine. He pointed out that they are unfamiliar with the climatic conditions and geography on the ground. He also claimed that the quality of their training in Russia is not high. Kateryna Stepanenko, an analyst at the Institute for the Study of War (ISW), pointed out that the term "elite" may not apply for North Korean troops. Despite these assessments, there were voices warning against underestimating the North Korean soldiers.

Ukraine informed the UN Security Council that Russia allegedly intended to integrate at least five North Korean brigades, each with 2,000 to 3,000 soldiers, into its armed forces. According to reports from the US Department of Defense, about 10,000 North Korean soldiers had allegedly arrived in the border region of Kursk by the end of October 2024. Purportedly among the North Korean units is Colonel General Kim Yong Bok, the commander of North Korea's special forces and a close confidant of North Korean leader Kim Jong Un.

South Korean intelligence has reported that North Korean soldiers deployed in Russia receive a monthly salary of around $2,000. Ahn Chang Il, a former lieutenant in the North Korean army, alleged that North Korean soldiers deployed to Russia saw their participation in the war in Ukraine as an opportunity for social advancement and financial improvement for their families. He also emphasized that the North Korean government promised incentives such as membership in the Workers' Party of Korea, which is necessary to advance in North Korean society.

On 5 August 2026, the head of the Ukrainian Main Directorate of Intelligence, Andrii Cherniak, announced that 90 soldiers from the North Korean 112th Missile Brigade had been deployed in the Russian oblast of Vorozneh, operating 120 ballistic missiles fired from six launchers.

=== Training and mobilization ===
The North Korean soldiers received their training at the Russian military training areas in Ussuriysk, Ulan-Ude and Knyazye-Volkonskoye, among other places. The soldiers were initially transported by Russian ships to Vladivostok, where they received Russian uniforms and fake identities to conceal their true origin. They had previously been trained at several locations in eastern Russia. The coordination and training, which lasts several weeks, is reportedly led by Russia's deputy defense minister Yunus-bek Yevkurov. Russia is providing the soldiers with ammunition, winter clothing, and hygiene products. Employees of the North Korean embassy were also purportedly taken to a training ground to supervise and translate for the soldiers during the exercises. The North Korean troops were transported from Vladivostok to a military airfield in western Russia in Ilyushin Il-76 transport planes and then flown to the combat zone. They were billeted in barracks about 50 kilometers from the border with Ukraine.

=== Effect on bilateral ties ===
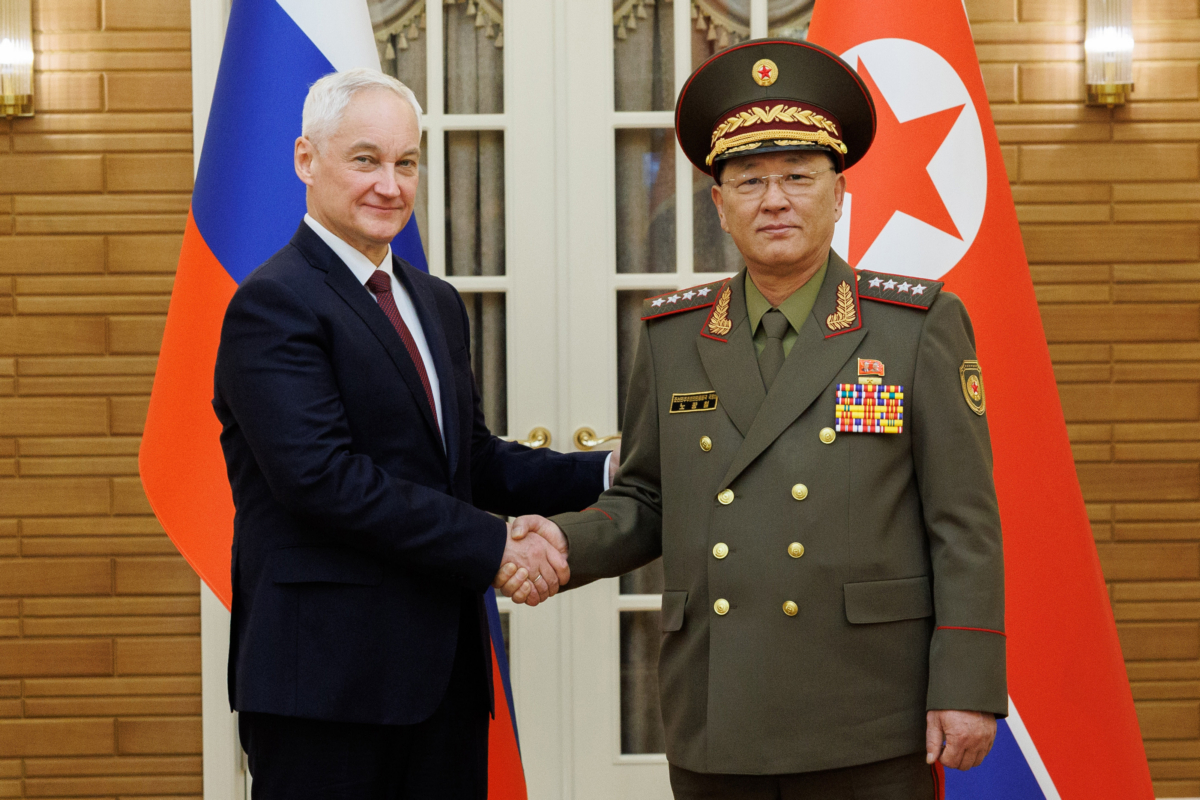
Russian Defense Minister Andrey Belousov with North Korean Defense Minister No Kwang-chol on 29 November 2024

At a meeting with Russian foreign minister Sergey Lavrov in Moscow on 1 November 2024, North Korean foreign minister Choe Son-hui announced that her country would continue to provide military support to Russia until it was victorious over Ukraine. In this context, Lavrov underlined the close cooperation between the military and security agencies of the two countries. According to Choe, Kim Jong Un ordered unconditional support for Russian forces and civilians in a “holy war” from the very beginning of the conflict. Choe then met with Russian president Vladimir Putin in Moscow on 4 November to discuss the deployment of North Korean soldiers to support Russia. On 6 November, the Russian Federation Council approved a defense agreement with North Korea. The agreement stipulates that both countries will provide each other with military support in the event of an attack.

The Atlantic Council reported that North Korean participation in the invasion allows the North Koreans to acquire priceless combat experience, test weapons systems, gain access to Russian military technologies, and secure Moscow's further assistance in countering UN sanctions.

=== Kursk campaign ===
Area in Kursk Oblast, Russia, where North Korean soldiers were deployed.

According to a report in The New York Times on 5 November 2024, clashes between Ukrainian and North Korean troops occurred for the first time in Russia's Kursk Oblast. Ukrainian president Volodymyr Zelenskyy assessed this development as significant and spoke of a new dimension of global instability. However, the fighting is said to have been limited and corroborating evidence equally so.

In an interview with the South Korean television station KBS, Rustem Umerov, the Ukrainian Defense Minister, said for the first time that Ukrainian and North Korean troops had skirmished. However, he also stated that North Korean forces were difficult to identify, as he said they were not only dressed in Russian uniforms, but also disguised as members of the Buryat ethnic group. Furthermore, he said the soldiers were fully integrated into the Russian army and operated under Russian command, which further complicated the determination of their actual identities.

On 11 January 2025, Ukraine announced it had captured two wounded North Korean soldiers in Kursk Oblast, who became the first two North Korean prisoners of the war. The South Korean National Intelligence Service (NIS) confirmed the North Korean origin of the two prisoners. According to the NIS, North Korean forces suffered 300 killed and almost 2,700 wounded soldiers by January 2025. By mid-January the estimate rose, with anonymous Western officials telling the BBC that it is estimated 1,000 killed in action, and a total of 4,000 casualties.

According to an NHK report filed on 19 February 2025, captured North Korean soldiers were told by their commanders that South Korean soldiers are present in Kursk alongside Ukrainian soldiers. They also mention inadequate Russian artillery cover, which led to their capture.

In April 2025, following the end of the Kursk campaign, the Russian and North Korean governments officially acknowledged North Korean involvement. Russian president Vladimir Putin lauded the North Korean soldiers as "heroic", and North Korean leader Kim Jong Un said that a monument to the Kursk offensive would be built in Pyongyang.

In June 2025, secretary of the Russian Security Council Sergei Shoigu announced that 1,000 North Korean military workers would be deployed to Kursk for demining, and another 5,000 for reconstruction.

In October 2025, the General Staff of the Ukrainian Armed Forces reported that North Korean soldiers based in Kursk are conducting recon operations with drones to help Russian soldiers identify targets.

In April 2026, on the first anniversary of the conclusion of the Kursk campaign, the North Korean government inaugurated a war memorial and museum commemorating its involvement in Ukraine, the Memorial Museum of Combat Feats at the Overseas Military Operations. At the opening ceremony, Kim Jong Un commended North Korean soldiers who "self-blasted" themselves with grenades to avoid being captured by Ukrainian forces.

=== Alleged deployment into Ukraine ===
In November 2025, Ukrainian media, citing pro-war Russian bloggers and telegram channels, stated that North Korean soldiers had allegedly arrived in Ukraine's Zaporizhzhia region and may be preparing to fight near the town of Huliaipole. However, Ukrainian officials and Western intelligence agencies have not confirmed the presence of North Korean troops in Ukraine itself. On 4 February 2026, Ukrainian military intelligence reported the presence of North Korean troops in the border regions from Kursk, targeting border communities.

== North Korean labor ==
The BBC reported that, in 2024, more than 10,000 North Korean workers were sent to work in "slave-like conditions" in Russian construction and other sectors, "in violation of the UN sanctions banning the use of North Korean labour". A South Korean intelligence official told the BBC that as many as 50,000 workers were to be deployed in 2025. The Modern War Institute at West Point stated that 30,000 North Korean laborers were deployed to support the frontlines as of August 2025.

== International reactions ==
=== Ukraine ===
Ukrainian president Volodymyr Zelenskyy has criticized the lack of decisive action by Western allies as a motivating factor for Russian President Vladimir Putin to continue his “terrorist” actions in the conflict, including the deployment of North Korean troops. Zelenskyy stated that North Korea had previously supported Russia in the war against Ukraine. He referred to US intelligence reports that North Korea had supplied Russia with three million artillery shells and missiles. Zelenskyy further stated that Russian president Vladimir Putin was avoiding large-scale mobilization in Russia because it could jeopardize his domestic political support. Instead, according to Zelenskyy, Putin sees North Korea as a strategic alternative. The North Korean leadership, in turn, sees this as an opportunity to give their soldiers combat experience in modern warfare. He also stated that Russia intends to use North Korean labor to address the shortage of labor not only in construction but also in military factories. Ukraine's representative to the UN, Serhiy Kyslytsia, warned the Security Council that the involvement of North Korean troops in Russia's war against Ukraine poses a serious threat to Europe and the Korean Peninsula.

=== Russia ===
Although North Korean troops were deployed to fight Ukrainian troops in early August 2024, Russia rejected the accusations of North Korean soldiers as "fake news". Putin later responded to questions about satellite images that allegedly indicated the presence of North Korean soldiers on Russian territory at a press conference on 24 October 2024, following the BRICS summit in Kazan, saying that "The images are serious. If there are images, then they reflect something." He also stated that the escalation of the situation in Ukraine was not caused by Russia's actions, but by the US-backed "coup" of 2014 (Euromaidan).

On 26 April 2025, following the end of the offensive, Russia's Chief of General Staff Valery Gerasimov finally confirmed North Korean involvement, stating:

Soldiers and officers of the Korean People's Army, fulfilling combat tasks shoulder to shoulder with Russian servicemen, in the course of repelling the Ukrainian incursion demonstrated high professionalism; and displayed resilience, courage, and heroism in battle.

In August 2024, Ukrainian forces crossed the border into Kursk Oblast, resulting in a small part of the oblast coming under Ukrainian occupation. In early April 2025, the Chief of Russia's General Staff Valery Gerasimov reported that Kursk Oblast had been liberated from Ukrainian troops.

In September 2025, Putin publicly thanked Kim Jong Un for sending North Korean troops to fight against Ukraine. In December 2025, Kursk Oblast Governor Alexander Khinshtein announced the city of Kursk would build a memorial to celebrate the North Korean soldiers who had been deployed to defend Kursk against Ukraine. The monument, which received support from the Russian defense ministry, will be built in the city of Kursk and is dedicated to “the combat brotherhood of the DPRK and Russia.”

In September 2026, at the opening of the Yakov Novichenko Bridge between North Korea and Russia, Russian Prime Minister Mikhail Mishustin referred to "the Korean heroes who, only recently, fought shoulder to shoulder with our soldiers and defended Russian soil".

=== United States ===
US defense secretary Lloyd Austin expressed concern about the possible consequences of the deployment. The US announced that it would take decisive action in response to North Korea's alleged military support for Russia in the Russo-Ukrainian war. US Secretary of State Antony Blinken said that North Korea could expect a "tough response" for the involvement of its troops in the fighting. He made the comments during a joint appearance with the NATO Secretary General in Brussels.

=== NATO ===
NATO Secretary General Mark Rutte warned of the geopolitical risks that could arise from increased military cooperation between North Korea and Russia, pointing out that this could further destabilize the dynamics of the war. On 28 October 2024, he spoke of a "significant escalation" in the Ukraine conflict due to the stationing of North Korean troops in Kursk Oblast. He said that the cooperation between Russia and North Korea endangers security in both the Indo-Pacific and the Euro-Atlantic area and further intensifies the war dynamic.

=== United Nations ===
UN Secretary-General António Guterres warned of a possible internationalization of the war.

=== Germany ===
During her trip to Kyiv on 4 November 2024, German foreign minister Annalena Baerbock emphasized that North Korea's military assistance to Russia was significantly exacerbating the situation, while Putin continued to pursue a war of attrition to demoralize the population.

=== Japan ===
On 1 September 2026, Japanese Ambassador to the United Nations, Kazuyuki Yamazaki, said military cooperation between North Korea and Russia was "undermining peace and security in Europe, the Indo-Pacific and beyond".

=== South Korea ===
On 7 November 2024, South Korean President Yoon Suk Yeol suggested that South Korea could provide weapons to Ukraine. However, the South Korean public was widely opposed to direct arms supplies to Ukraine. On 1 September 2026, South Korean Ambassador to the United Nations Cha Ji-hoon delivered the remarks to the UN General Assembly, expressing South Korea's "serious concern" about the "unabated" military cooperation between North Korea and Russia, and urged them to "immediately cease" their "unlawful military cooperation", which he said is "in clear violation" of UN Security Council resolutions.

== See also ==
- North Korea–Russia relations
- North Korea–Ukraine relations
