= Khalyava (river) =

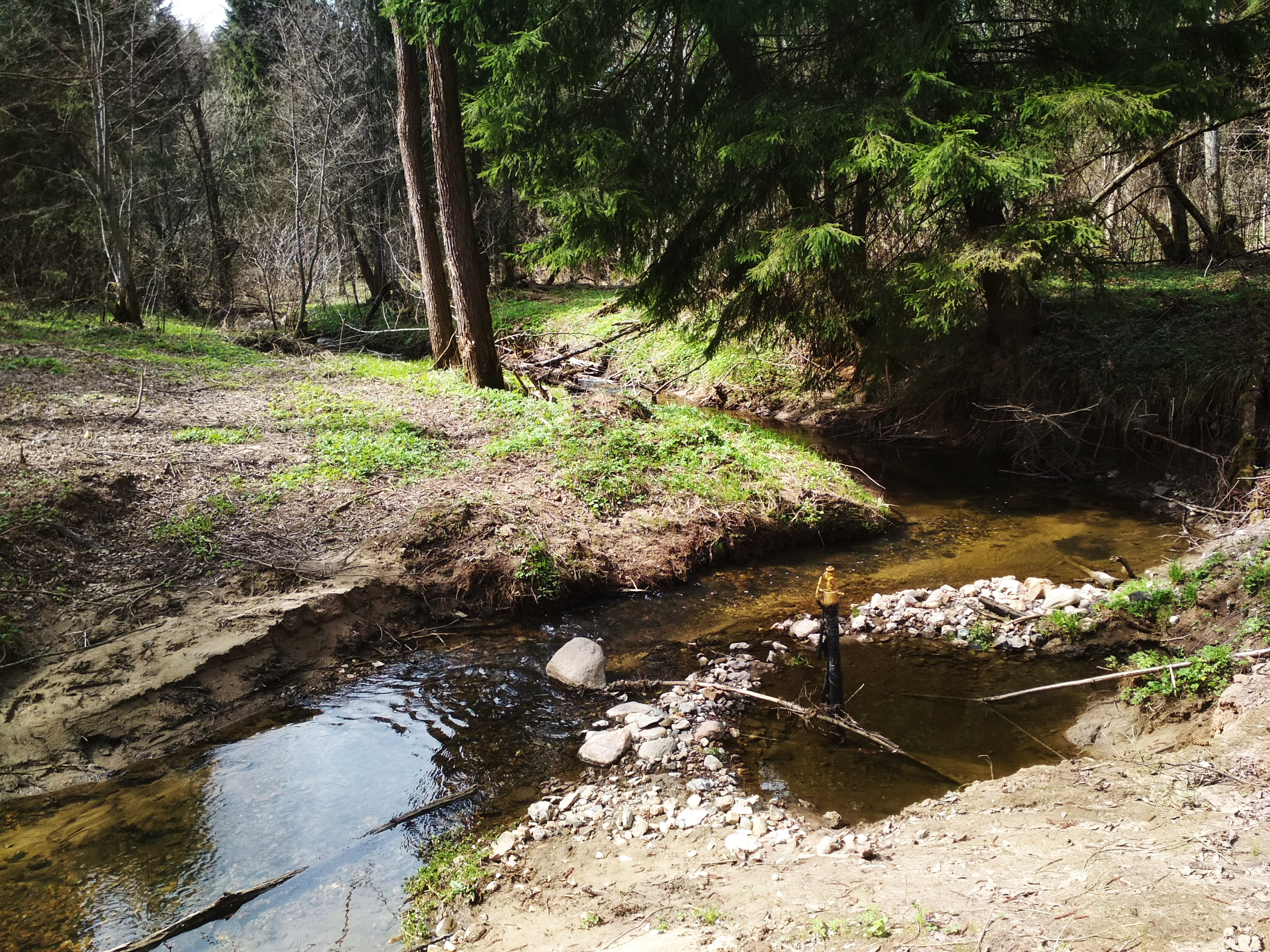
- Native name: Халява (Russian)

Location
- Country: Russia

Physical characteristics
- Mouth: Moskva
  - coordinates: 55°41′30″N 36°55′27″E
- Length: 4 km (2.5 mi)
- Basin size: 12-15 km²

Khalyava (Kholyava, Khalyavka, Russian: Халява, Холява, Халявка) is a river in the Moscow Region of Russia, near Zvenigorod. Right tributary of Moskva.

It flows through the territory of the rural settlement of Zakharovskoye, Odintsovsky District, near the village of Maryino.

The length of the river is 4 km, the area of the drainage basin is 12-15 km². Under the village of Maryino on the right bank there is a captive spring. The river is mentioned in the sources of 1624.
