= XI Corps (North Korea) =

- Active: January 1969–present
- Country: Democratic People's Republic of Korea
- Allegiance: Workers' Party of Korea
- Branch: Korean People's Army
- Type: Infantry
- Size: 40,000 to 80,000 soldiers
- Part of: Korean People's Army Ground Force
- Garrison/HQ: Tokchon
- Nicknames: Old Special 8th Legion, Old Alert Map Bureau, 4th Army Corps, Unit 630 Unit
- Engagements: Russian invasion of Ukraine (Per Ukraine): Kursk offensive (2024–2025) (Per Ukraine)

The XI Corps (also known as Storm Corps), are a corps of the Korean People's Army and an elite unit of the North Korean Special Forces. It is stationed in Tokchon, South Pyongan Province.

== History ==
The 17th Reconnaissance Brigade merged with the 124th Army and 283th Army of the National Security Agency's Reconnaissance Division, to form the Special 8th Army in January 1969.

The Special 8th Army Corps was centered on Unit 124, which carried out the Blue House raid in 1968. In 1983, North Korea reorganized the unit into Light Infantry Training and Guidance Bureau. Then they merged other special forces and reorganized it to create the Storm Corps or 11th Corps in 1991.

In 2020, members of the Corps were sent to the Sino-DPRK border area of Ryanggang Province to combat smuggling and other "anti-state" activities.

In 2024, soldiers from the XI Corp were deployed to the Kursk front with their counterparts from the Reconnaissance General Bureau.

In January 2025, it was reported that the North Korean infantry, deployed to the Kursk front of the Russo-Ukrainian War, consisted of 4 brigades from the North Korean 11th Corps. In November 2025, the unit was visited by Supreme Leader Kim Jong-un.

== Organization ==
The following units are under the corps:

- 16th Sniper Brigade
- 38th Aviation Army Brigade in Sangwon County, Pyongyang
- 43rd Mountain Army Infantry Sniper Brigade-5 battalions, Kapsan County, Hyesan, Ryanggang-do

=== Manpower ===
As of 2025, the unit has around 40,000 to 80,000 soldiers.

== Bibliography ==
- Mitzer, Stijn; Oliemans, Joost (2020). The Armed Forces of North Korea: On the Path of Songun. Helion and Company. ISBN 978-1910777145.
