= Permanent Representative of South Korea to the United Nations =

Ambassador and Permanent Representative of South Korea to the United Nations
- Incumbent; Cha Ji-hoon since 19 September 2025
- Style: His Excellency
- Appointer: President of South Korea
- Formation: November 1951
- Website: Permanent Mission of the Republic of Korea to the United Nations

The role of the permanent representative of South Korea to the United Nations (Korean: 주유엔 대한민국 대사) is the head of the South Korean delegation to the United Nations in New York and the head of the Permanent Mission of South Korea to the UN.

== Officeholders ==
No.	Name	Took office	Left office
1	Yim Byung-jik	November 1951	September 1960
2	Lim Chang-young	September 1960	June 1961
3	Lee Soo-young	July 1961	May 1964
4	Kim Yong-shik	May 1964	December 1970
5	Han Pyo-wook	January 1971	May 1973
6	Park Tong-jin	May 1973	December 1975
7	Moon Duk-joo	March 1976	April 1979
8	Yoon Seok-hyun	April 1979	December 1981
9	Kim Kyung-won	December 1981	October 1985
10	Choi Kwang-soo	October 1985	August 1986
11	Park Keun	August 1986	March 1988
12	Park Ssang-yong	March 1988	April 1990
13	Hyun Hong-joo	April 1990	February 1991
14	Roh Chang-hee	February 1991	February 1992
15	Yoo Chong-ha	February 1992	December 1994
16	Park Soo-gil	January 1995	April 1998
17	Lee See-young	April 1998	February 2000
18	Sun Joon-young	March 2000	June 2003
19	Kim Sam-hoon	June 2003	May 2006
20	Choi Young-jin	May 2006	July 2007
21	Kim Hyun-chong	July 2007	May 2008
22	Park In-kook	May 2008	May 2011
23	Kim Sook	May 2011	September 2013
24	Oh Joon	September 2013	December 2016
25	Cho Tae-yul	December 2016	October 2019
26	Cho Hyun	October 2019	July 2022
27	Hwang Joon-kook	July 2022	July 2025
28	Cha Ji-hoon	September 2025	Incumbent
