= Maryino, Vyaznikovsky District, Vladimir Oblast =

Maryino Марьино
- Village
- Location within Vladimir Oblast Location within Russia
- Coordinates: 56°14′N 42°16′E
- Country: Russia
- Region: Vladimir Oblast
- District: Vyaznikovsky District
- Time zone: UTC+3:00

Maryino (Russian: Марьино) is a rural locality (a village) in Gorod Vyazniki, Vyaznikovsky District, Vladimir Oblast, Russia. The population was 27 as of 2010.

== Geography ==
Maryino is located on the Klyazma River, 11 km east of Vyazniki (the district's administrative centre) by road. Shchekino is the nearest rural locality.
