= Maryino, Odintsovsky District =

Maryino Ма́рьино
- Village
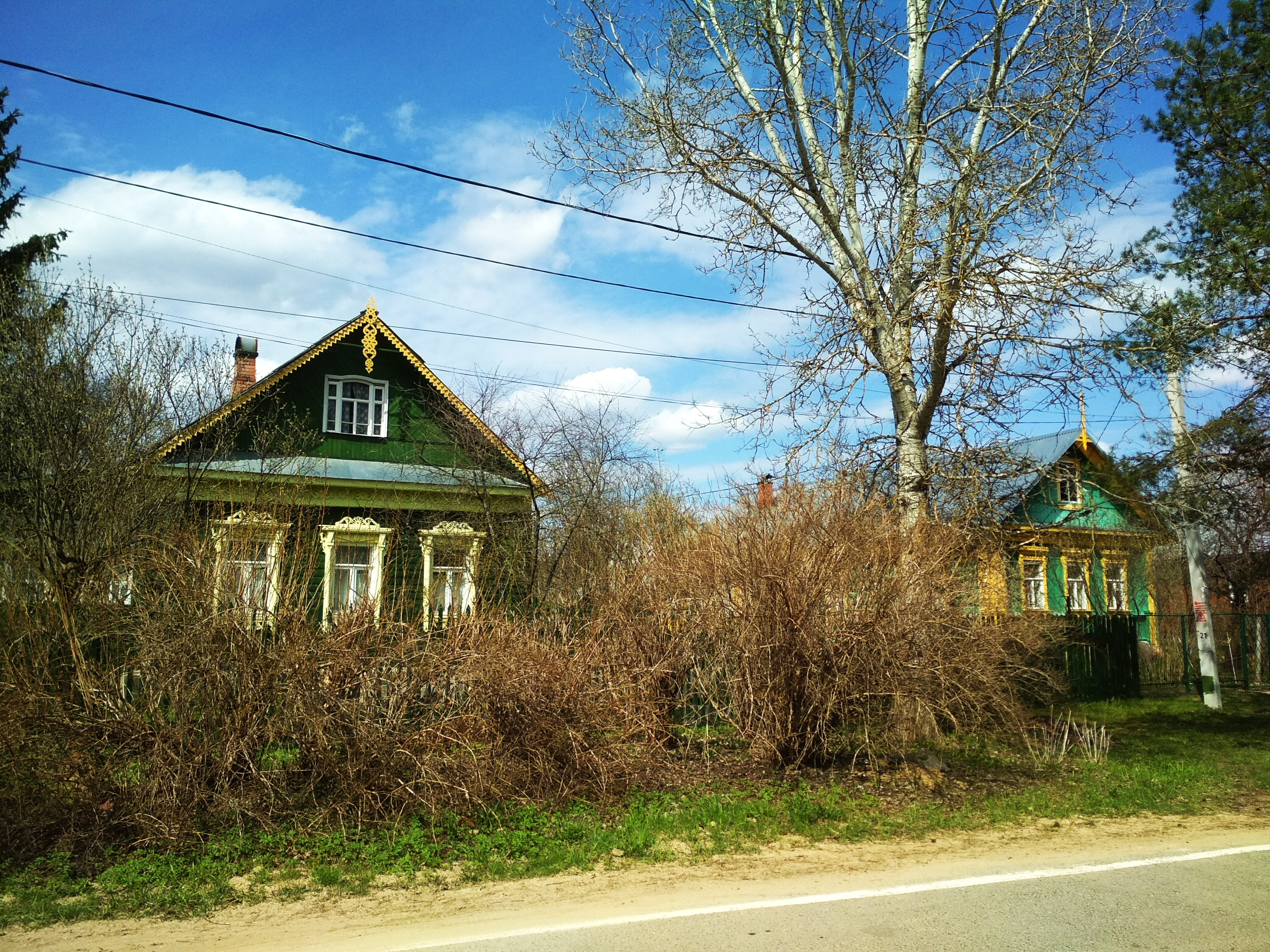

- Location within Moscow Oblast Location within Russia
- Coordinates: 55°42′25″N 36°53′50″E
- Country: Russia
- Region: Moscow Oblast
- District: Odintsovsky District
- Time zone: UTC+3:00

Maryino (Russian: Ма́рьино) is a village in the rural settlement of Zakharovskoye, Odintsovsky District, Moscow Region, Russia. There are 1 street and 1 gardening association in the village. Until 2006, Maryino was part of the Vvedensky rural district.

External image
- Марьино at 1970-s, household 45. Source and description.

The village is located in the west of the district, 3 km southeast of Zvenigorod, on the right bank of the small river Khalyavka, the height of the center above sea level is 173 m.

For the first time in historical documents it was mentioned in 1624 as the wasteland of Varganovskaya, Maryino, too, on the Kholyavka River, was subsequently settled and became a village. According to the description of 1678, there are 12 households and 54 inhabitants in Maryino, in 1705 - 11 households, according to the Economic Notes of 1800, 13 households, 72 male and 59 female souls. In 1852, there were 19 households in the village, 73 men and 90 women, in 1890 - 150 people. According to the All-Union census on December 17, 1926, there were 39 farms and 186 residents, according to the 1989 census - 47 farms and 108 residents.

Under the village of Maryino on the right bank of the river Khalyavka there is a captive spring.

== Gallery ==
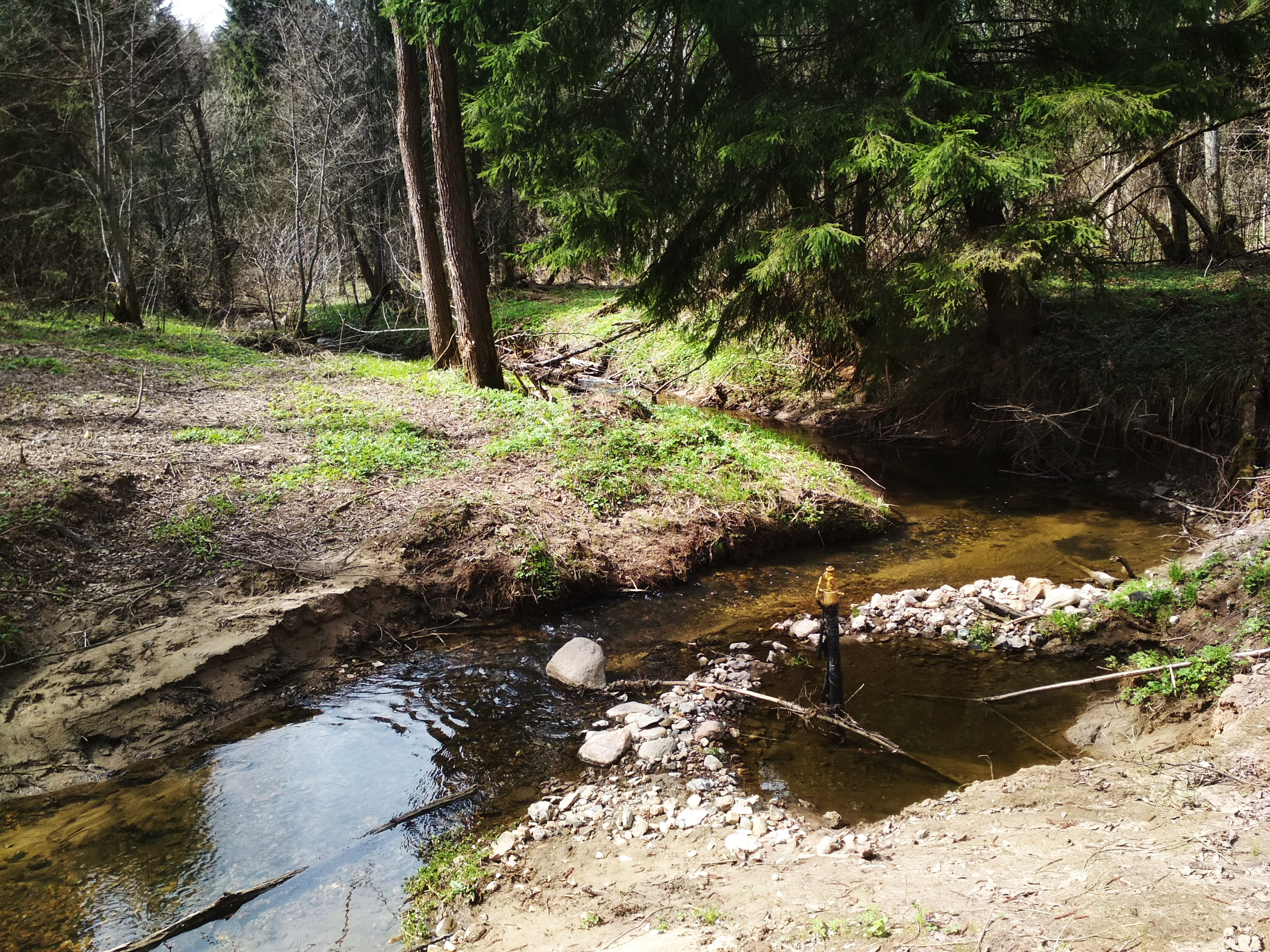

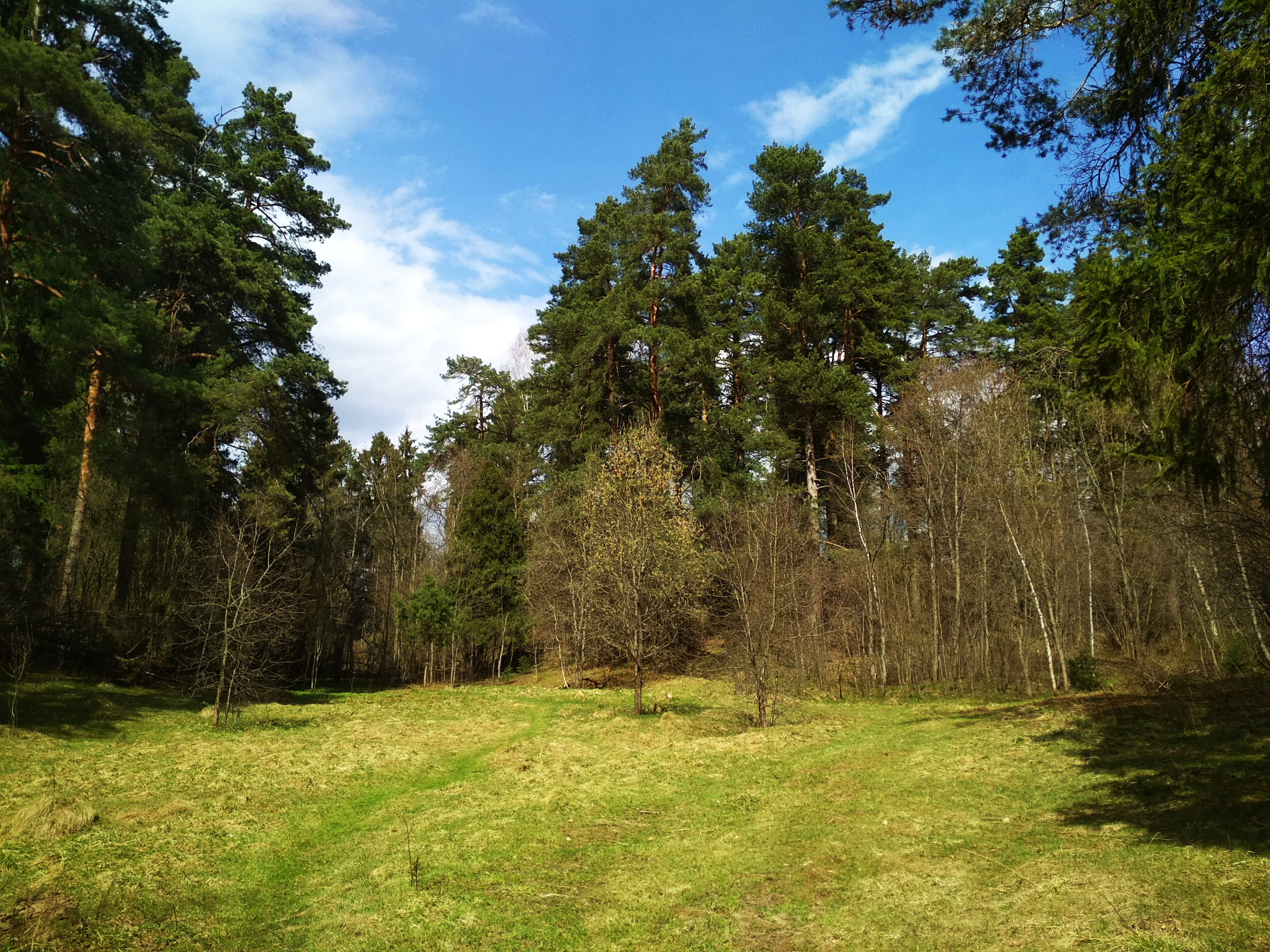

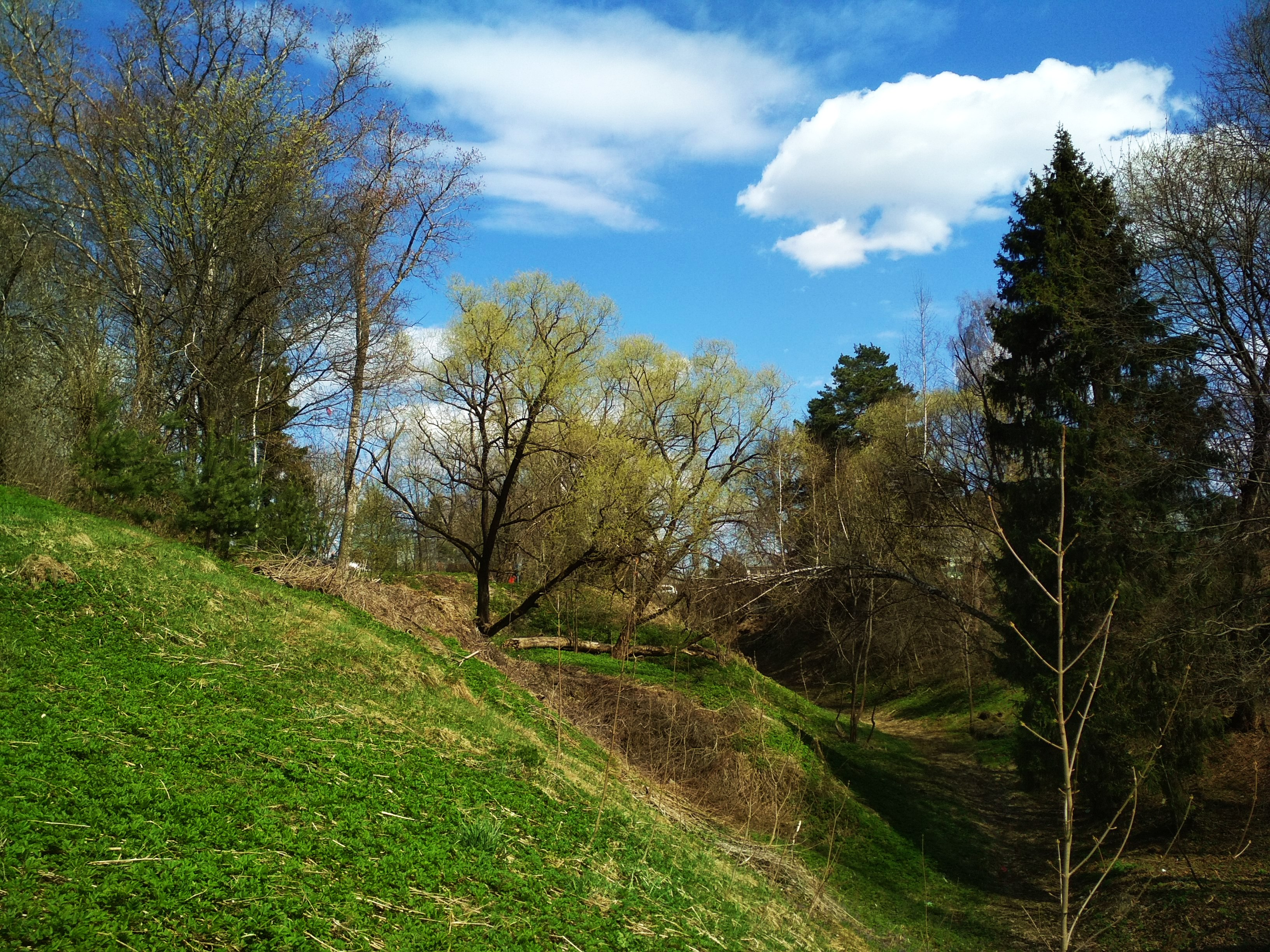

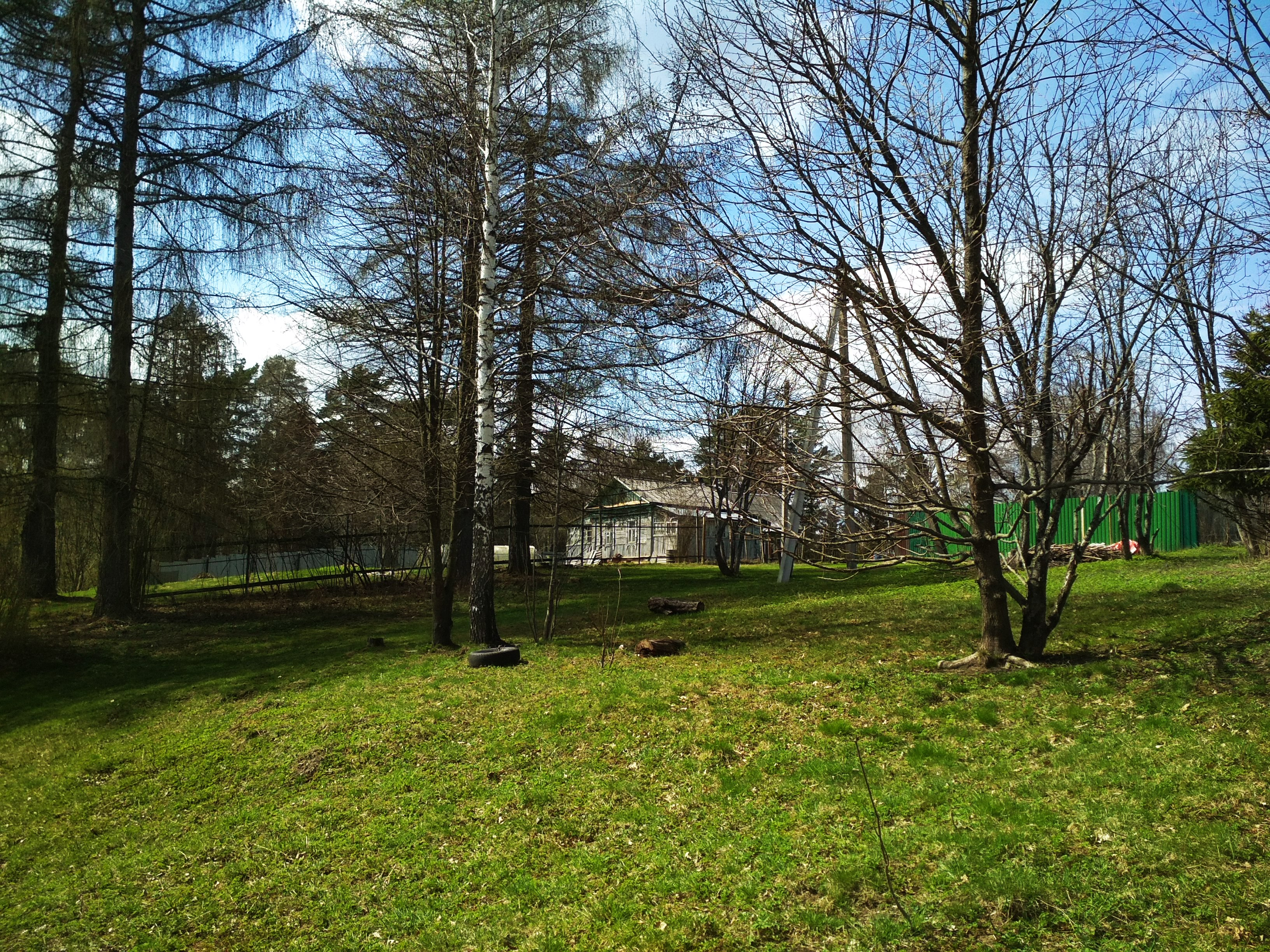

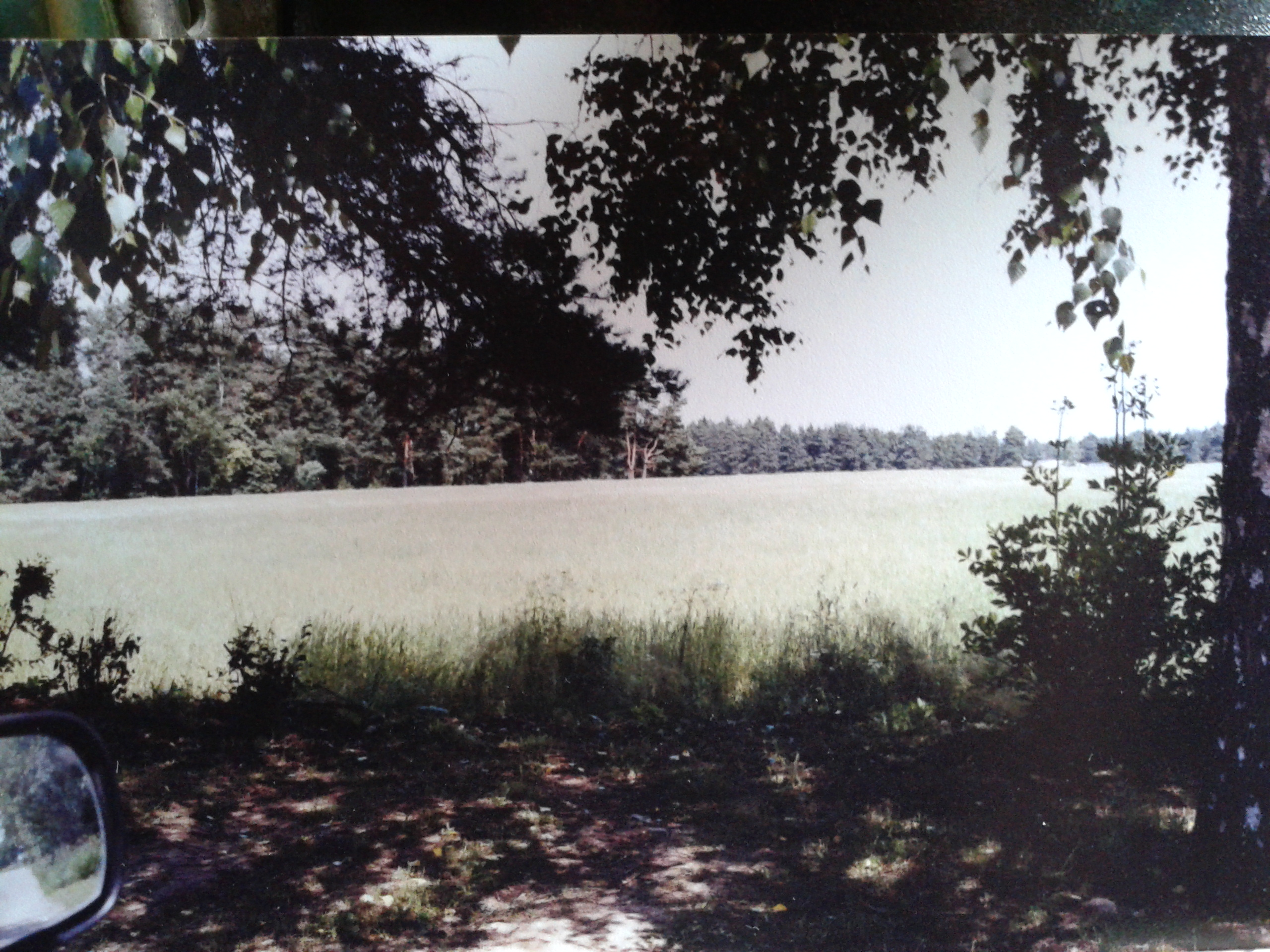

== Sources ==
- Города и поселения Одинцовского района. Марьино
- Карта Одинцовского района
- Ю. А. Насимович «Природные и культурные достопримечательности Одинцовского района»
