= Cha Ji-hoon =

South Korean diplomat (born 1963)

His Excellency Cha Ji-hoon

28th Permanent Representative of South Korea to the United Nations
- Incumbent
- Assumed office 19 September 2025
- President: Lee Jae Myung
- Prime Minister: Kim Min-seok
- Preceded by: Hwang Jun-guk

Personal details
- Born: 27 July 1963 (age 63) Suncheon, South Jeolla Province, South Korea
- Education: Seoul National University

Korean name
- Hangul: 차지훈
- Hanja: 車智勳
- RR: Cha Jihun
- MR: Ch'a Chihun

Cha Ji-hoon (Korean: 차지훈; born June 27, 1963) is a South Korean diplomat and lawyer who has served as the permanent representative of South Korea to the United Nations since September 2025.

== Education ==
Cha Ji-hoon was born in Suncheon, South Jeolla Province, and graduated from Suncheon High School and the College of Law at Seoul National University. He then earned a Master of Laws degree from the American University of Washington School of Law.

== Career ==
After returning to South Korea, he worked as a lawyer, serving as Chairman of the International Solidarity Committee of the Lawyers for a Democratic Society, International Human Rights Specialist at the National Human Rights Commission of Korea, Legal Advisor on International Investment Disputes for the Ministry of Justice, and International Arbitrator at the Korean Commercial Arbitration Board.

He was appointed as the first ambassador to the United Nations under the Lee Jae-myung government on March 20, 2025. The Ministry of Foreign Affairs described him as a legal professional with a deep understanding of international issues, such as international arbitration and international finance, and extensive experience in arbitration and negotiation, stating that he is expected to play his role effectively on a stage that demands advanced knowledge of international law and seasoned negotiation skills. On October 19, he presented his credentials to UN Secretary-General António Guterres and began his official activities on the UN diplomatic stage.
