= Maryino, Kovrovsky District, Vladimir Oblast =

Maryino Марьино
- Selo
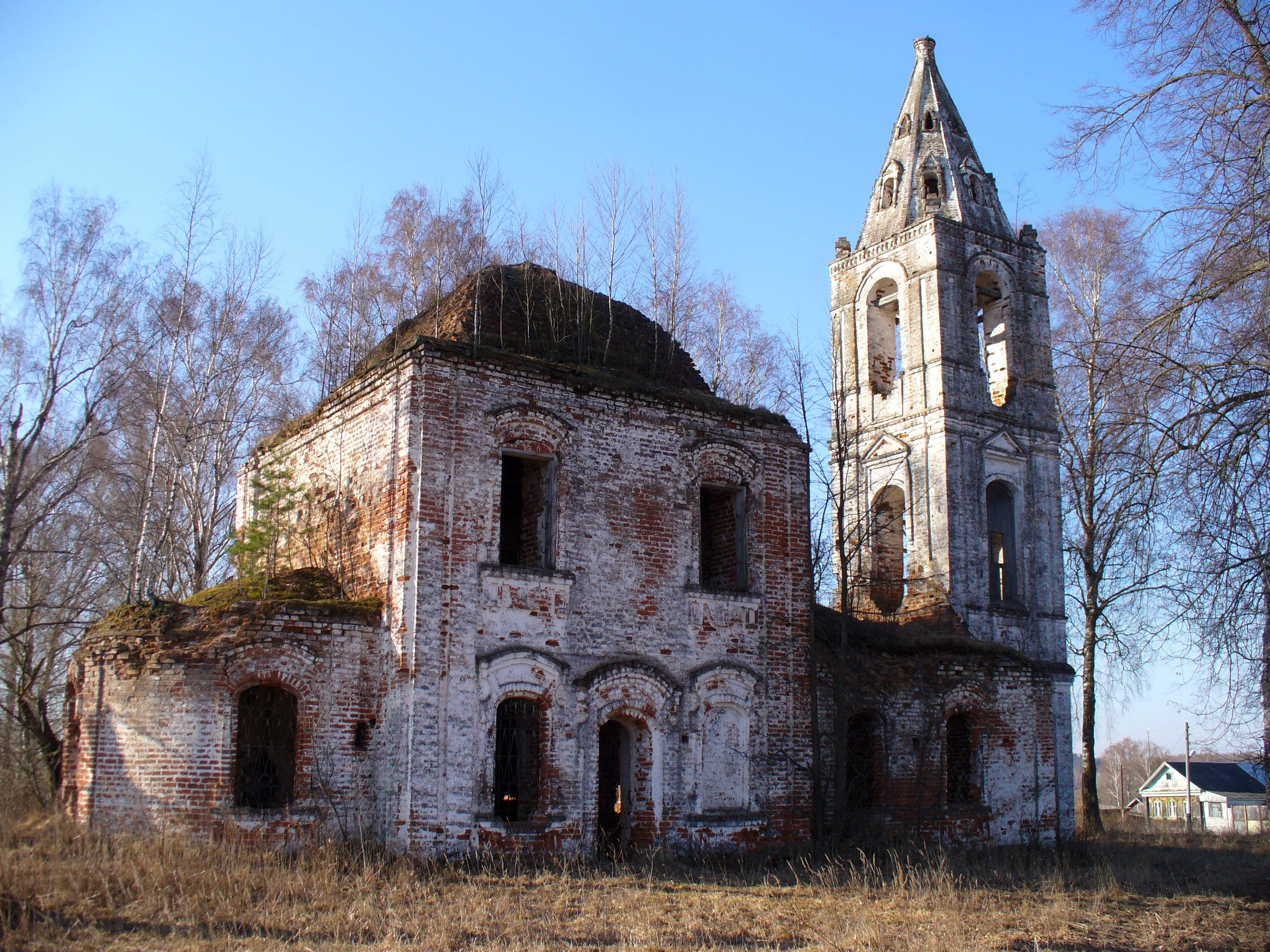
- Praises of the Theotokos church, Maryino

- Location within Vladimir Oblast Location within Russia
- Coordinates: 56°11′N 41°19′E
- Country: Russia
- Region: Vladimir Oblast
- District: Kovrovsky District
- Time zone: UTC+3:00

Maryino (Russian: Марьино) is a rural locality (a selo) in Novoselskoye Rural Settlement, Kovrovsky District, Vladimir Oblast, Russia. The population was 38 as of 2010.

== Geography ==
Maryino is located on the Nerekhta River, 22 km south of Kovrov (the district's administrative centre) by road. Krutovo is the nearest rural locality.
