= M-1978 Koksan =

M-1978 Koksan 주체포 (Korean)
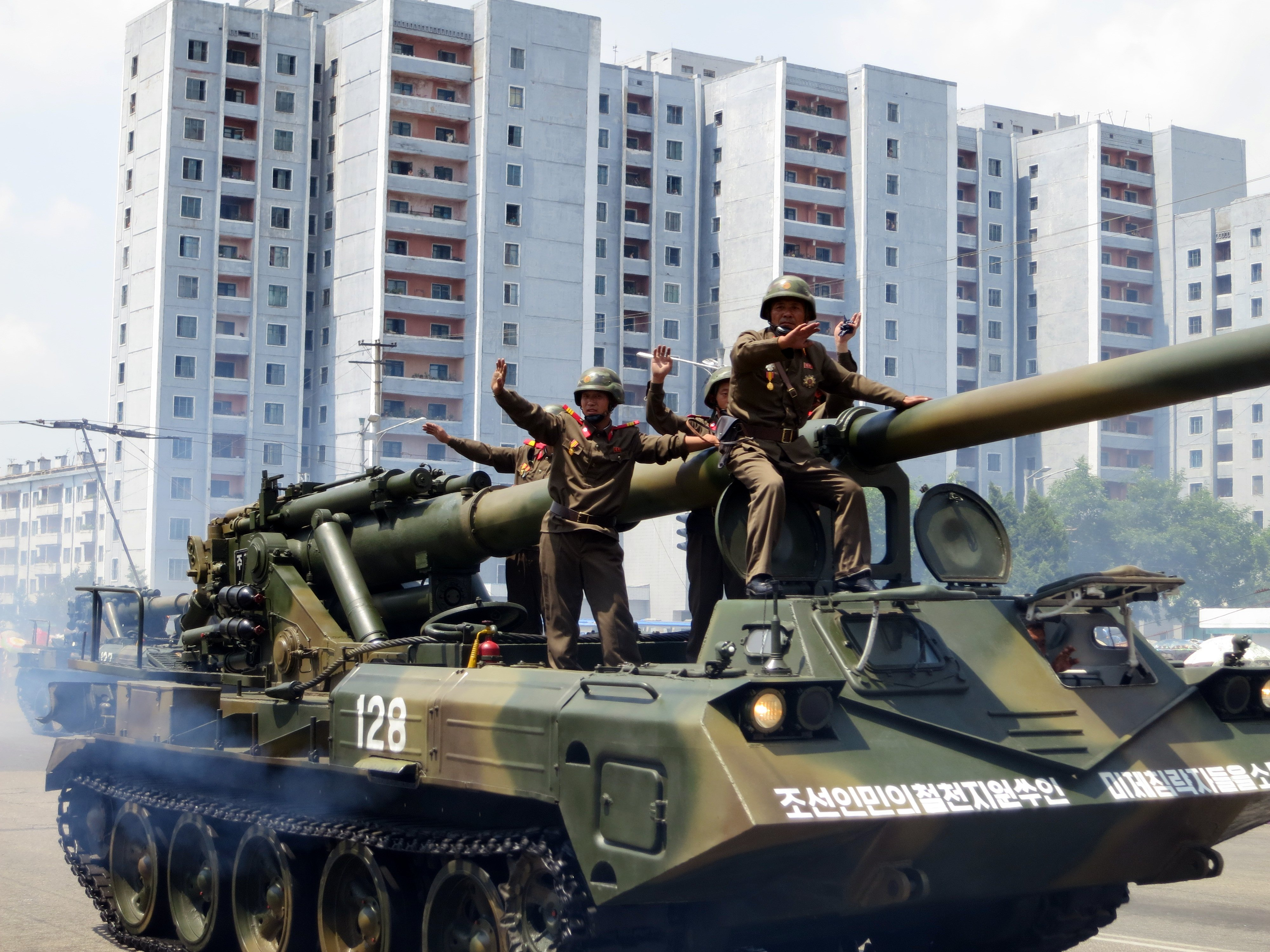
- A North Korean M-1989 version of Koksan photographed in North Korea in 2013.
- Type: Self-propelled artillery
- Place of origin: North Korea

Service history
- In service: 1978–present
- Used by: See operators
- Wars: Iran–Iraq War; Russo-Ukrainian war

Production history
- Manufacturer: Second Economic Committee
- Variants: See variants

Specifications (M-1978 Koksan)
- Mass: 40,000 kg (88,000 lb)
- Length: 14.9 m (49 ft)
- Width: 3.27 m (10.7 ft)
- Height: 3.1 m (10 ft)
- Crew: 4, up to 6 (presumed)
- Caliber: 170 mm (6.7 in) L/66
- Recoil: Hydraulic
- Rate of fire: ~1–2 rounds per 5 minutes
- Effective firing range: 40–50 km (25–31 mi) (est.)
- Maximum firing range: 60 km (37 mi) (with RAP round)
- Armor: Steel
- Main armament: 1× 170 mm (6.7 in) rifled gun
- Engine: Diesel; 520 hp (390 kW)
- Suspension: torsion bar
- Operational range: 250–350 km (160–220 mi) (road)
- Maximum speed: 30–40 km/h (19–25 mph)

- M-1978 Koksan
- Hangul: 주체포
- Hanja: 主體砲
- RR: Juchepo
- MR: Chuch'ep'o

M-1978 Koksan (Korean: M-1978 곡산), a name used by US military analysts, known by its makers as the Chuch'ep'o (Juche Cannon; 주체포), is a North Korean self-propelled 170 mm (6.7 in) gun based on the Type 59 tank chassis.

Some guns were exported to Middle Eastern countries in the late 1980s and used during the Iran–Iraq War. The M-1989 Koksan variant has seen use in the Russo-Ukrainian war.

== Development ==
According to former Janes editor, Christopher F Foss, the Koksan is based on a Chinese Type 59 tank chassis, while Mitzer and Oliemans note the possibility of being a Soviet T-54/T-55 tank chassis instead. The 170 mm gun is in an open mount with no superstructure and is stabilized when firing by two large folding spades at the rear. It also has a multislotted muzzle brake (but no fume extractor) and probably a power rammer. Elevation and traverse appear to be powered, although gun traverse is very limited to avoid overstressing the chassis. The gun has a range that would allow it to strike Seoul from the Korean Demilitarized Zone. The range appears to have determined the choice of caliber.

According to Foss, the 170 mm gun may be a Russian naval gun or coastal artillery system supplied to North Korea in the 1950s. After these were replaced in the coastal defence role by guided missiles, the retired guns could have been used to create the Koksan; another suggestion is that it was based on the German World War 2 era 17 cm Kanone 18. According to Bermudez Jr., the gun appears to be an indigenous design influenced by the German gun and the Japanese Type 96 15 cm cannon, which was mounted on coastal defence fortresses in the Korean peninsula controlled by the Seventeenth Area Army during the final stages of WWII.

== Variants ==
=== M-1978 Koksan ===
The designations M-1978 and Koksan were given to the type by US military analysts, as they first became aware of it in that year in Koksan, North Korea.

The system is based on the T-55 or Type 59 main battle tank chassis, with the turret removed, plated over and mounting a 170 mm (6.7 in) rifled gun. The gun is fitted with two hydraulic recoil and stabilizing spades at the rear and a large folding lock for the gun for travelling. According to Bermudez Jr., the Koksan can fire high-explosive fragmentation (HE-FRAG), and rocket-assisted projectiles (RAP). It is also possible that the North Koreans have developed chemical rounds for the gun.

According to Foss, the M-1978 is probably fitted with an NBC protection system and infrared night vision sights for the driver. Like the Type 59 tank, the M-1978 can lay its own smokescreen by injecting diesel fuel into the exhaust. The M-1978 chassis does not have enough space for the gun crew and ammunition, requiring another vehicle to carry the remainder of the crew and some of the ammunition. Presumably, the chassis provides the crew with the same level of protection as the Type 59 MBT.

=== 180 mm M-1978 ===
A M-1978 with a mounted 180 mm (7.1 in) gun instead. According to Bermudez Jr., this variant was either built by North Korea for Iran and captured later by Iraqi forces during the Iran–Iraq War, or an Iraqi design based on the Koksan. It can be distinguished by the barrel and the pepperpot-shaped muzzle brake.

=== M-1989 Koksan ===
Also known as the M-1989 Juche, it uses the same gun and mount of the M-1978, but is mounted on a modified AT-S tracked artillery tractor chassis. It can be distinguished from the M-1978 by the longer chassis. The forward road wheels are more widely separated from the rest, providing greater reliability, stability, and crew comfort in comparison to its predecessor. Two armoured cabs located in the front and center of the vehicle provide protection to the onboard crew members including the driver and commander, while the rest of the crew are carried on a separate vehicle carrying extra ammunition. According to a Russian-translated manual obtained by the Armed Forces of Ukraine, the Juche gun has a firing rate of 2 rounds per minute with a range over 50 km (31 mi).

During parades, one of the crew members is often seen armed with a 9K34 Strela-3 or a 9K310 Igla-1 shoulder-launched anti-aircraft missile. According to Bermudez Jr., the M-1989 has a passing resemblance to the Soviet 2S7 Pion self-propelled gun, which may have inspired the North Koreans. The M-1989 can carry 12 rounds on board.

M-1989s deployed in the Russian invasion of Ukraine are fitted with additional slat armor to mitigate the effect of loitering munitions.

Unlike its predecessor, the M-1989 has occasionally been put on public display by the North Koreans during parades and news broadcasts. One example has also been seen on display at International Defence Exhibition and Conference 2005 in the United Arab Emirates.

== Organization ==
Little is publicly known about how North Korea organizes and deploys its artillery. It has been suggested by Bermudez Jr. that battalions equipped with M-1978s and M-1989s have 12 guns, 20-30 trucks and 150-190 personnel, organized into a battalion headquarters and three batteries with four guns per battery. Battalions are organized into a brigade consisting of 3 to 6 battalions, with a brigade headquarters and supporting engineer, air-defense and target acquisition units. According to Foss, the Koksan was originally employed in regiments with 36 guns each.

== Operational history ==
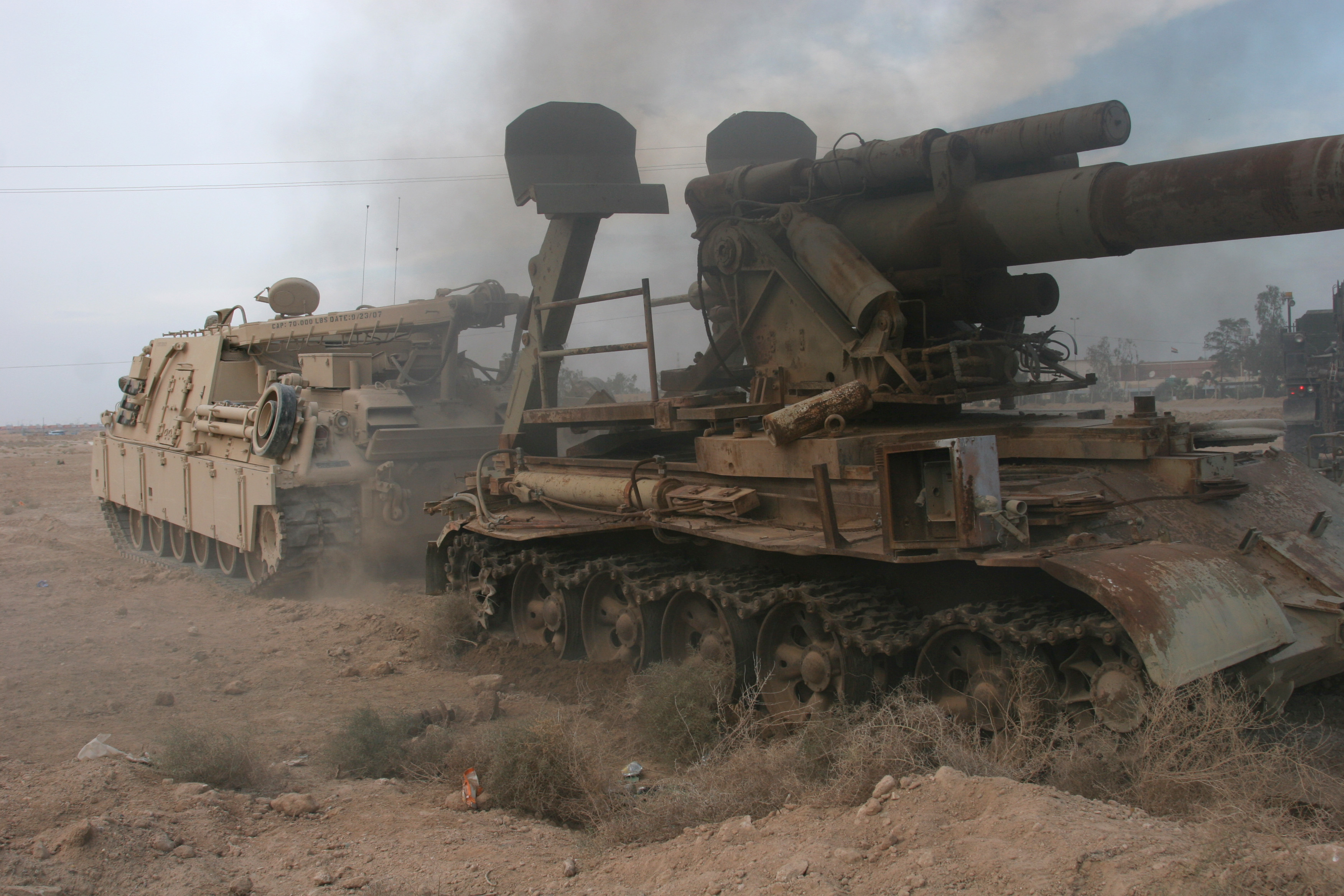
A 180 mm Koksan, found on the campus of the University of Anbar is removed by US Marines in November 2008

=== Iran–Iraq War ===
In 1987, several M-1978s were supplied to Iran and used during the Iran–Iraq War. Some of them were damaged, destroyed, or captured by Iraqi forces.

Iran used the weapon system around Al-Faw and for strikes on Kuwaiti oil production facilities.

A number of the captured Iranian guns were placed on public display. At least one of these was recovered by US Marines in 2008 from the campus of the University of Anbar.

=== Al Anbar University ===
A Koksan artillery piece was towed to University of Anbar around the 29 May 2003. At this time, soldiers from the United States 2/5 Field Artillery Battalion had been occupying the grounds of the university. The self-propelled weapon was towed to the university grounds so that it could be returned with the unit as a trophy, an idea that was eventually abandoned. At this time soldiers from the 2/5 Battalion disabled the gun with a thermite device. Eventually, the 2/5 Battalion was reassigned to a new area of operations and the cannon was left at the university.

=== Russian invasion of Ukraine ===
On 14 November 2024, OSINT analysis geolocated the M-1989 Koksan being transported by rail in the city of Krasnoyarsk. Ukrainian intelligence sources claimed that Russia had acquired at least 50 M-1989 Koksans by mid-November. Defence analysts told NK News that the transfer of Koksans would help Russia reinforce its arsenal of heavy artillery such as the 2S7 Pion and 2S7M Malka, and that North Korea would probably send artillery crews to operate them. In November 2024, the Ukrainian Main Directorate of Intelligence (HUR) reported that over 60 M-1989 Koksans were in Russia, some of which would be transferred to the Saratov Artillery Command School for training purposes.

As of January 2025 it was not clear if these were exclusively used by North Korean troops in Kursk, or supplied to Russia. On 22 January 2025 the head of the HUR, Lt. General Kyrylo Budanov told The War Zone that Russia had been provided with 120 M-1989 Koksans in the previous three months, and that North Korea "will likely send at least as many more in the future".

According to the ZDF, Russia received up to 200 systems from North Korea. As of April 2025, Ukraine reportedly destroyed five M-1989 Koksans with drones, while the OSINT website Oryx states that one was visually confirmed as destroyed. At the end of September 2025, Ukraine reported destroying four Koksan systems in Luhansk and Zaporizhzhia regions on Russia-occupied territory of Ukraine.

== Operators ==
=== Current ===
- Iran − M-1978 variant
- North Korea
- Russia − Up to 200 systems, according to the ZDF

=== Former ===
- Iraq − Captured from Iran
- United Arab Emirates − Received some M-1989 Koksans

== See also ==
- 2S7 Pion, a similar Soviet heavy self-propelled artillery piece
- M107 self-propelled gun, heavy SPG formerly used by the United States and NATO-countries
