= Maryino, Kolchuginsky District, Vladimir Oblast =

Maryino Марьино
- Village
- Location within Vladimir Oblast Location within Russia
- Coordinates: 56°20′N 39°21′E
- Country: Russia
- Region: Vladimir Oblast
- District: Kolchuginsky District
- Time zone: UTC+3:00

Maryino (Russian: Марьино) is a rural locality (a village) in Kolchugino, Kolchuginsky District, Vladimir Oblast, Russia. The population was 45 as of 2010. There are 4 streets.

== Geography ==
Maryino is located on the Peksha River, 6 km north of Kolchugino (the district's administrative centre) by road. Otyayevka is the nearest rural locality.
