= Korean People's Army Special Operations Forces =

North Korean military unit

- 조선인민군 특수작전군 朝鮮人民軍 特殊作戰軍; Chosŏn inmin'gun t'ŭksu chakchŏn'gun
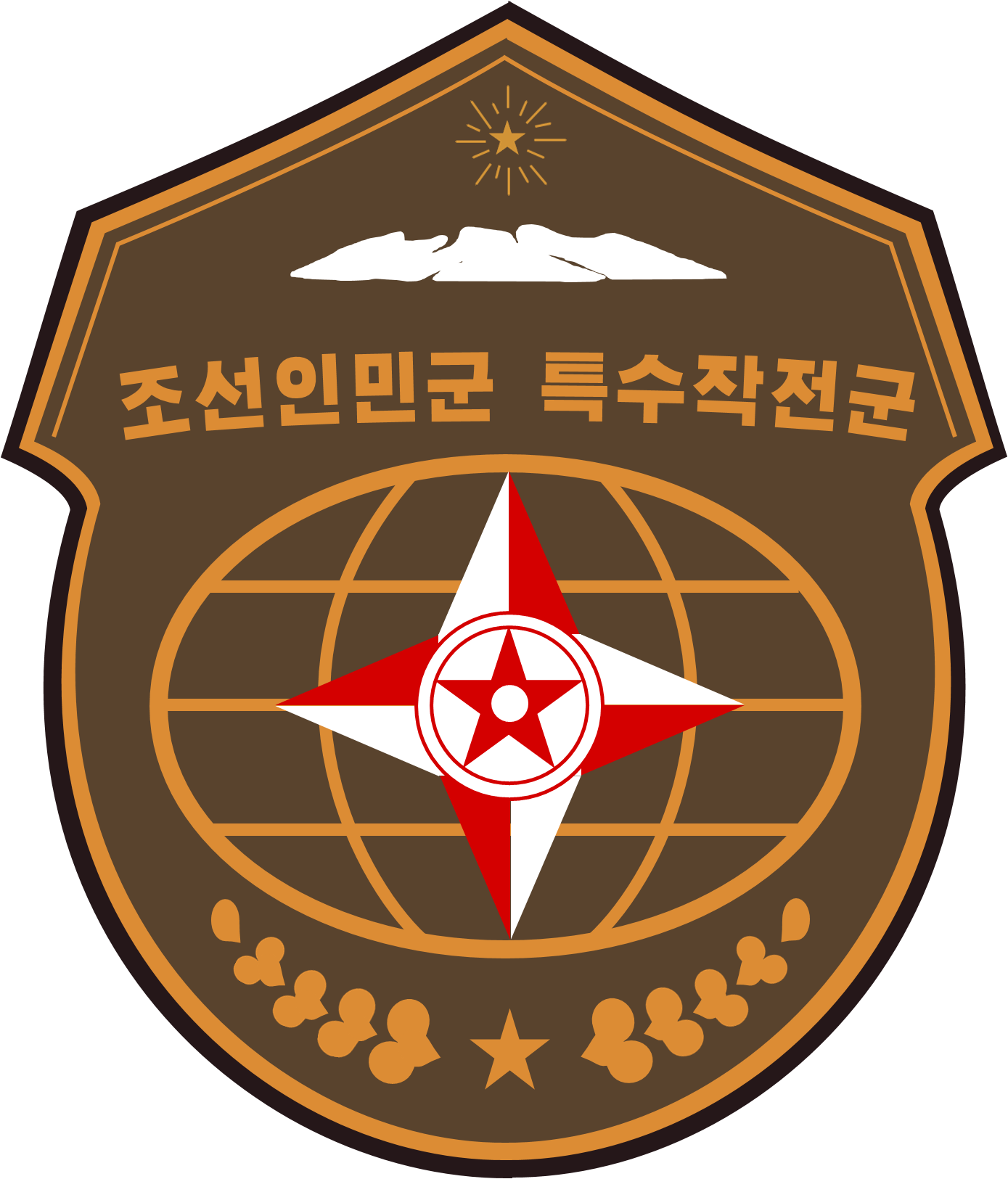
- Patch of the Korean People's Army Special Operations Forces (2022–)
- Active: 30 October 1968–present (earliest known date)
- Country: North Korea
- Allegiance: Workers' Party of Korea
- Type: Special operations
- Role: Special operations
- Size: 200,000
- Part of: Korean People's Army
- Engagements: Russo-Ukrainian war; Kursk campaign

Commanders
- Chief of the General Staff: Korean People's Army Vice Admiral Ri Yong-gil
- Commander-in-Chief of the Special Operations Forces: Colonel General Kim Yong Bok

The Korean People's Army Special Operations Forces (KPASOF; Korean: 조선인민군 특수작전군; Hanja: 朝鮮人民軍 特殊作戰軍; MR: chosŏninmin'gun t'ŭksujakchŏn'gun) are the special operations forces of Korean People's Army.

== History ==
North Korean special operations forces existed by late-1968 when maritime commandos made the unsuccessful Uljin–Samcheok Landings against South Korea.

A new special operations unit wearing what appeared to be modern combat gear appeared in the Day of the Sun military parade on 15 April 2017. According to North Korean state media, the new unit, the Lightning Commandos, was intended to counter the U.S. Navy SEALs and Republic of Korea Navy Special Warfare Flotilla.

On July 27, 2023, soldiers from the 41st Amphibious Assault Battalion marched during a military parade.

Elements of the KPASOF have been deployed to Russia as a part of the North Korean involvement in the Russian invasion of Ukraine from October 2024.

== Mission ==
The missions of the KPA Special Operations Forces are to breach the fixed defense of South Korea, to create a "second front" in the enemy's rear area, and to conduct battlefield and strategic reconnaissance. These would sometimes be done while disguised as South Korean soldiers.

The KPA SOF performs military, political, and psychological operations.

According to the Yonhap News Agency, the KPA SOF also counters American and South Korean attempts to end Kim Jong-Un's rule.

== Organization ==
=== Reconnaissance Brigades ===
The KPASOF are part of the ground intelligence effort of the KPA. Additionally, these units carry out assassination attempts.

=== Airborne ===
The Antonov An-2 transport aircraft is used for infiltration. They can also carry unguided bombs and rockets for night attacks.

=== Maritime SOF ===
A 1998 U.S. Army estimate assessed that the North Koreans can deliver over 7,000 SOF personnel to each of South Korea's coastlines.

Based on the number of ships available to the KPA special forces, they could deliver 5,000 of these soldiers in one lift (approximately 102 amphibious craft).

It is expected that these special forces once ashore, will attempt to infiltrate South Korea's rugged terrain to attack the South Koreans in their rear areas just before and during the renewed commencement of hostilities between the two countries.

The KPA Navy has 24 Romeo class diesel electric submarines. as well as specially outfitted Sang-O class submarines for coastal infiltrations. Finally, the KPA Navy possesses at least forty-five midget submarines for infiltrating two to five man teams into South Korean territory.

== Weapons ==
Name	Country of origin	Type	Notes
Baek Du San	North Korea	Pistol	Locally produced copy of the CZ 75
vz.61	Czechoslovakia	Machine pistol	
AK-105	North Korea	Carbine	Locally produced copies with a shortened barrel and a 20-round box magazine
Type 88	North Korea	Assault rifle	AK-74 copy, used with top folding stocks and helical magazine attached Being issued to SOF units.
M16A1	United States	Assault rifle	Locally made copies or some provided to North Korea through Vietnam; spotted during the 1996 Gangneung submarine infiltration incident
K2	South Korea	Assault rifle	Locally made copies in production since the 1990s.

== Bibliography ==
- Mitzer, Stijn.; Oliemans, Joost (2020). The Armed Forces of North Korea: On the Path of Songun. Helion and Company. ISBN 9781910777145.
