= Maryino, Vologodsky District, Vologda Oblast =

Maryino Марьино
- Village
- Location within Vologda Oblast Location within Russia
- Coordinates: 59°22′N 39°16′E
- Country: Russia
- Region: Vologda Oblast
- District: Vologodsky District
- Time zone: UTC+3:00

Maryino (Russian: Марьино) is a rural locality (a village) in Kubenskoye Rural Settlement, Vologodsky District, Vologda Oblast, Russia. The population was 6 as of 2002.

== Geography ==
Maryino is located 57 km (35.4 mi) northwest of Vologda (the district's administrative centre) by road. Makarovo is the nearest rural locality.
