= Maryino, Chagodoshchensky District, Vologda Oblast =

Maryino Марьино
- Village
- Location within Vologda Oblast Location within Russia
- Coordinates: 59°05′N 35°10′E
- Country: Russia
- Region: Vologda Oblast
- District: Chagodoshchensky District
- Time zone: UTC+3:00

Maryino (Russian: Марьино) is a rural locality (a village) in Belokrestskoye Rural Settlement, Chagodoshchensky District, Vologda Oblast, Russia. The population was 31 as of 2002.

== Geography ==
Maryino is located 19 km (12 mi) southwest of Chagoda (the district's administrative centre) by road. Zaluzhye is the nearest rural locality.
