= Maryino Estate, Kursk Oblast =

Estate in western Russia

Maryino Estate
- Усадьба Марьино
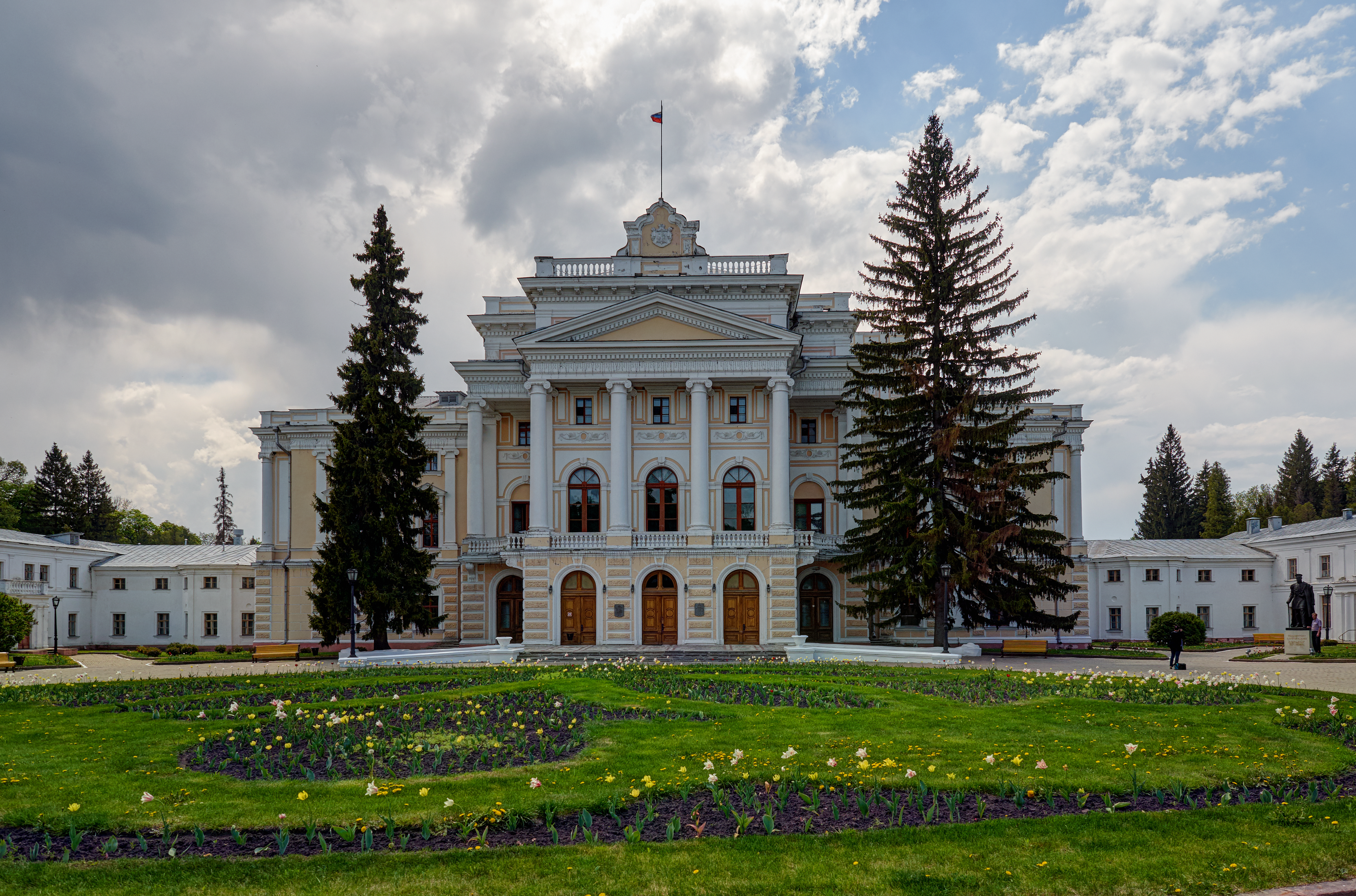
- Interactive map of Maryino Estate
- Location: Maryino, Rylsk District, Kursk Oblast, Russia
- Type: Estate and protected area
- Material: Classical architecture
- Completion date: 1811-1820
- Website: www.marino-kursk.ru

Maryino Estate (Russian: Усадьба Марьино) is an estate of the Russian aristocratic Baryatinsky family, located in Rylsk District in Kursk Oblast in Russia. The complex was completed in the 1810s to commemorate the family. The estate was named in honor of the two wives of Prince Ivan: Maria Franziska Detton, who died shortly after the birth of her daughter, and Maria Feodorovna Keller.

== History ==
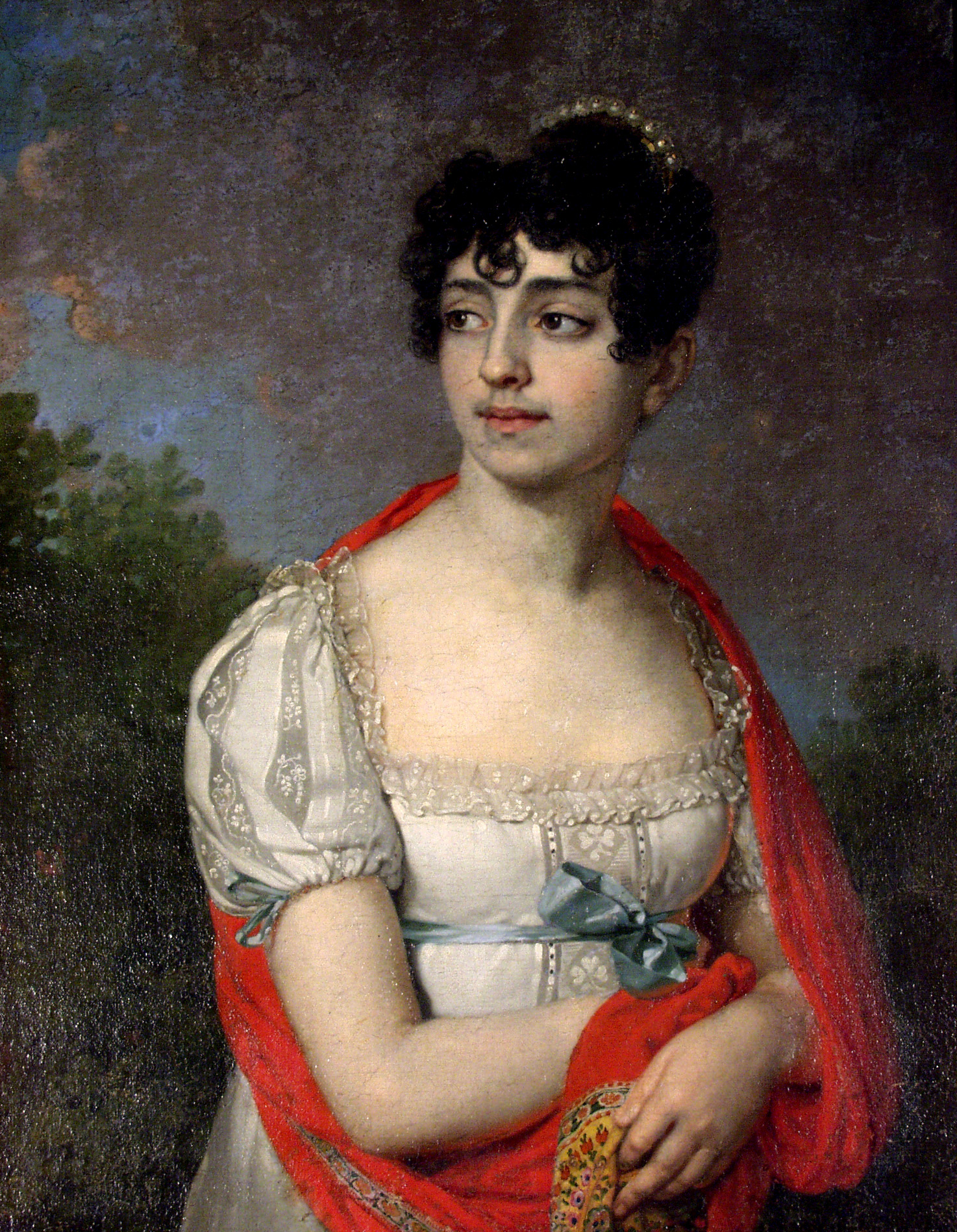
Princess Maria Baryatinskaya, the person the estate is named after

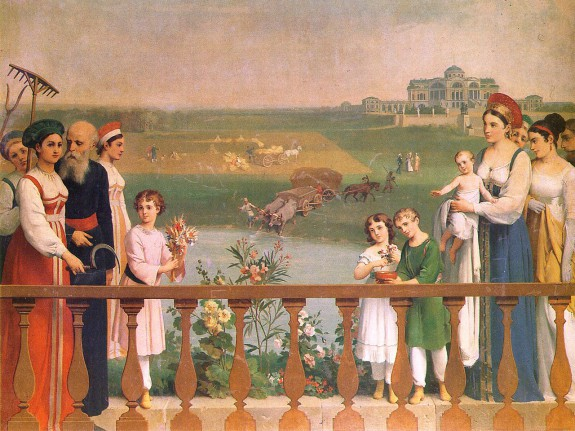
Idyllic view of the estate in the early 19th century

Following the death of the wife of Prince Ivan Baryatinsky, the Governing Senate issued a decree declaring the Maryino Estate a reserve in October 1859, and the estate was inherited by Ivan's two oldest sons: Alexander and Vladimir. By the time of the outbreak of WWI, the estate was in the hands of Vladimir.

In November 1917, following the October Revolution, the landownership of Maryino Estate was abolished through a decree. During the Russian Civil War in the years following, many aristocratic estates were destroyed, including Maryino. In 1918, the People's Commissariat for Education sent a commission to remove valuables from Maryino, and relocated to different parts of Russia.

In 1919-1922, Maryino housed an agricultural technical school. From December 1922, Maryino became a home for the People's Commissariat, then later for the Soviet Central Executive Committee.

In the 1930s, the church on the estate was destroyed from an order by Mikhail Kalinin, and a school was built in its place. Other areas were also converted for other purposes, including the desecration of 19 graves.

In 1940, the holiday home was liquidated, and a school for political commissars was opened in place. During Nazi occupation, Hitler allegedly gave this estate to General Heinz Guderian. Following the war, Maryino first became a hospital, then later a holiday home for wounded pilots.

In October 1952, Maryino Estate became the sanatorium of the Administrative Department of the Communist Party Central Committee. In 1980, work began on major repairs and restoration, originally planned for completion in 1995. However, the dissolution of the Soviet Union in 1991 led to a change in leadership, and the repair costs went to the Russian government instead.

=== Russo-Ukrainian War ===
In November 2024, during the Russian invasion of Ukraine, the Ukrainian military struck the nearby village of Maryino with British-supplied Storm Shadow missiles. According to Ukrainian journalists, the strike targeted the Maryino Estate, which may house an underground command post for Russian and North Korean troops. Russian president Vladimir Putin confirmed an attempted strike on the command post of the Russian military's North group, and Western officials said that the strike had wounded a high-ranking North Korean general. According to a Russian source, the strike killed 18 Russian servicemen and wounded 33 others, including 3 North Koreans.

== Infrastructure ==
=== Construction process ===
The estate was constructed between 1811 and 1820 to be the main residence for the Baryatinsky family, and the manor house to be a symbol of the family's dignity and grandeur. The design of the complex was based on a plan from architect Karl Hoffman.

Initially, the palace was called "Izbitsky Dom" (Избицкий дом) based on the name of the nearby river, but was later renamed "Maryino". The Bolshoy Maryinsky Pond was built on the nearby Izbitsa River.

In 1860, a new church in Byzantine architecture style was constructed in the estate complex. In 1869-1870, the palace was reconstructed by the architect Carl Scholz with help from Fyodor Bruni, where much of the interior changed from its Empire style to a more Academic style.

=== Current status ===
In the center of the estate complex is a four-story manor house with two-story side wings that form two farmyards. Some ornaments that have been preserved include ceiling moldings, marble fireplaces, pre-revolutionary parquets, and antique furnitures. The landscape park contains a round and oval pond with two islands connected by three bridges, as well as statues in Empire style. The first island contains a 16-column rotunda, while the other has a miniature Lutheran church.

At the beginning of the 21st century, the estate housed a sanatorium of the Directorate of the President of the Russian Federation. The sanatorium has a house church and a museum. In recent years, several monuments have been built in the park; there has also been introduction of various modern paintings, including copies of famous paintings on patriotic themes as well as portrait replicas of the palace's previous owners. In front of the main entrance to the manor house stands a monument to Field Marshal Alexander Baryatinsky.

== Gallery ==
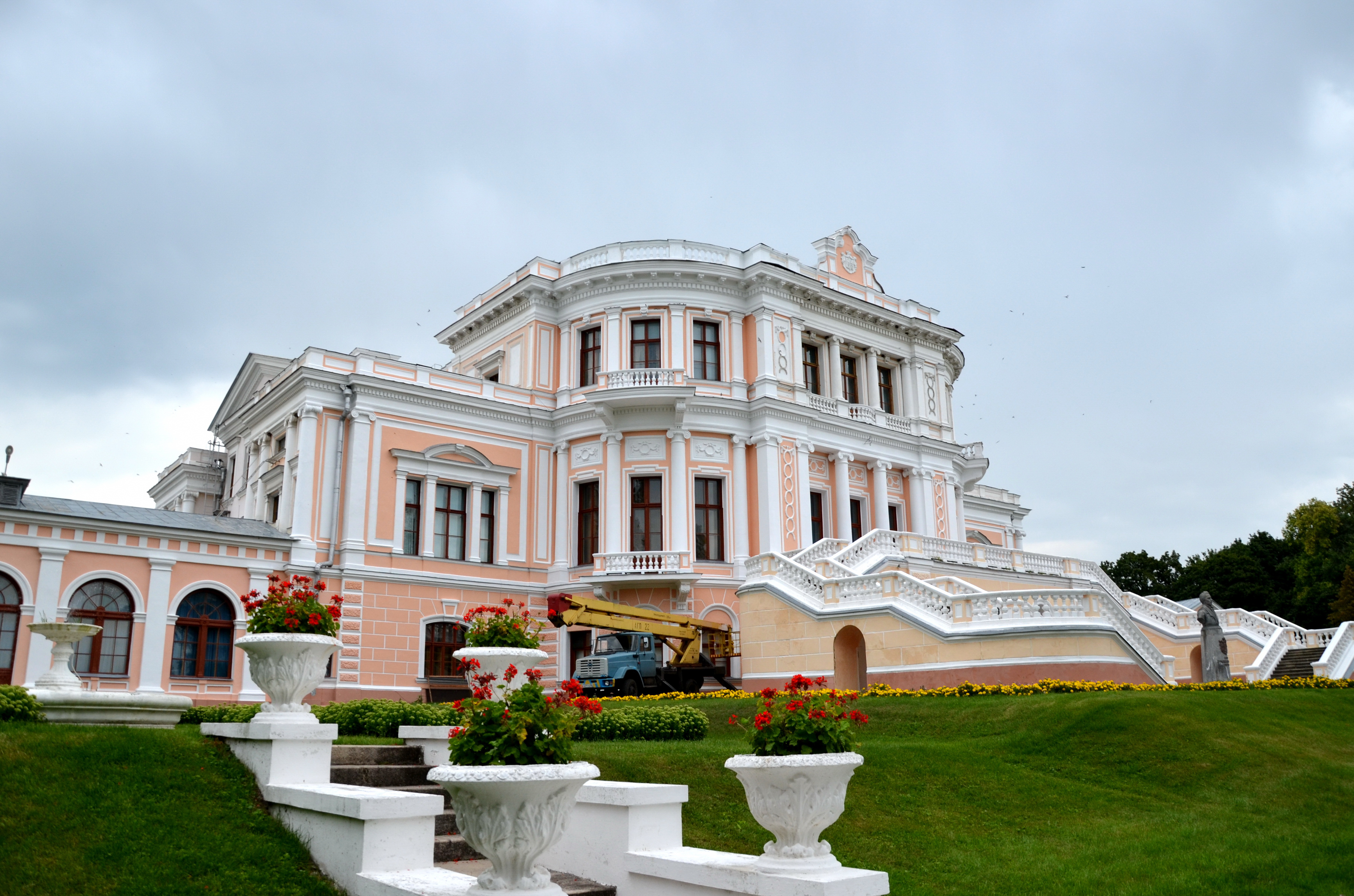
Facade of the estate

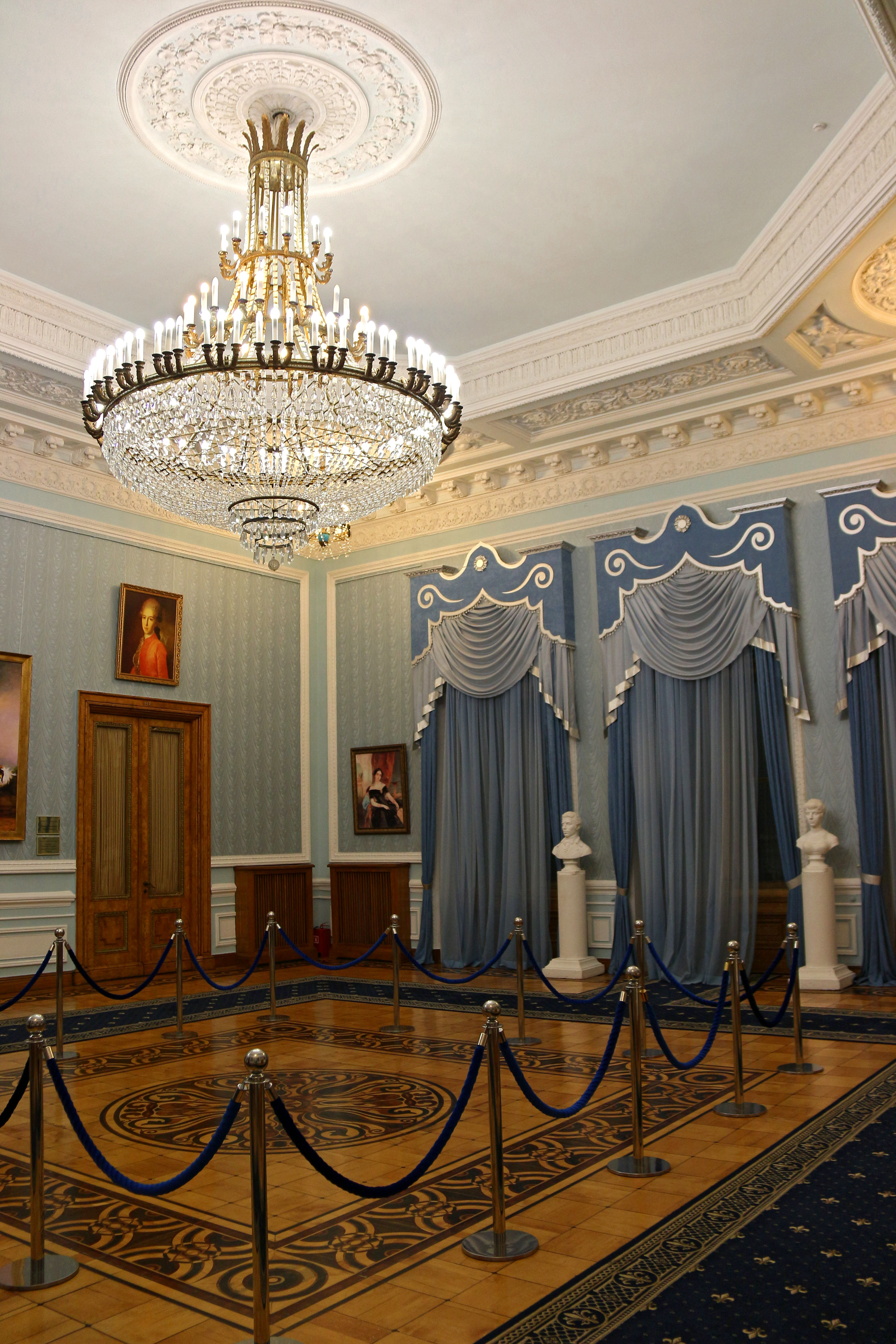
Interior of the halls

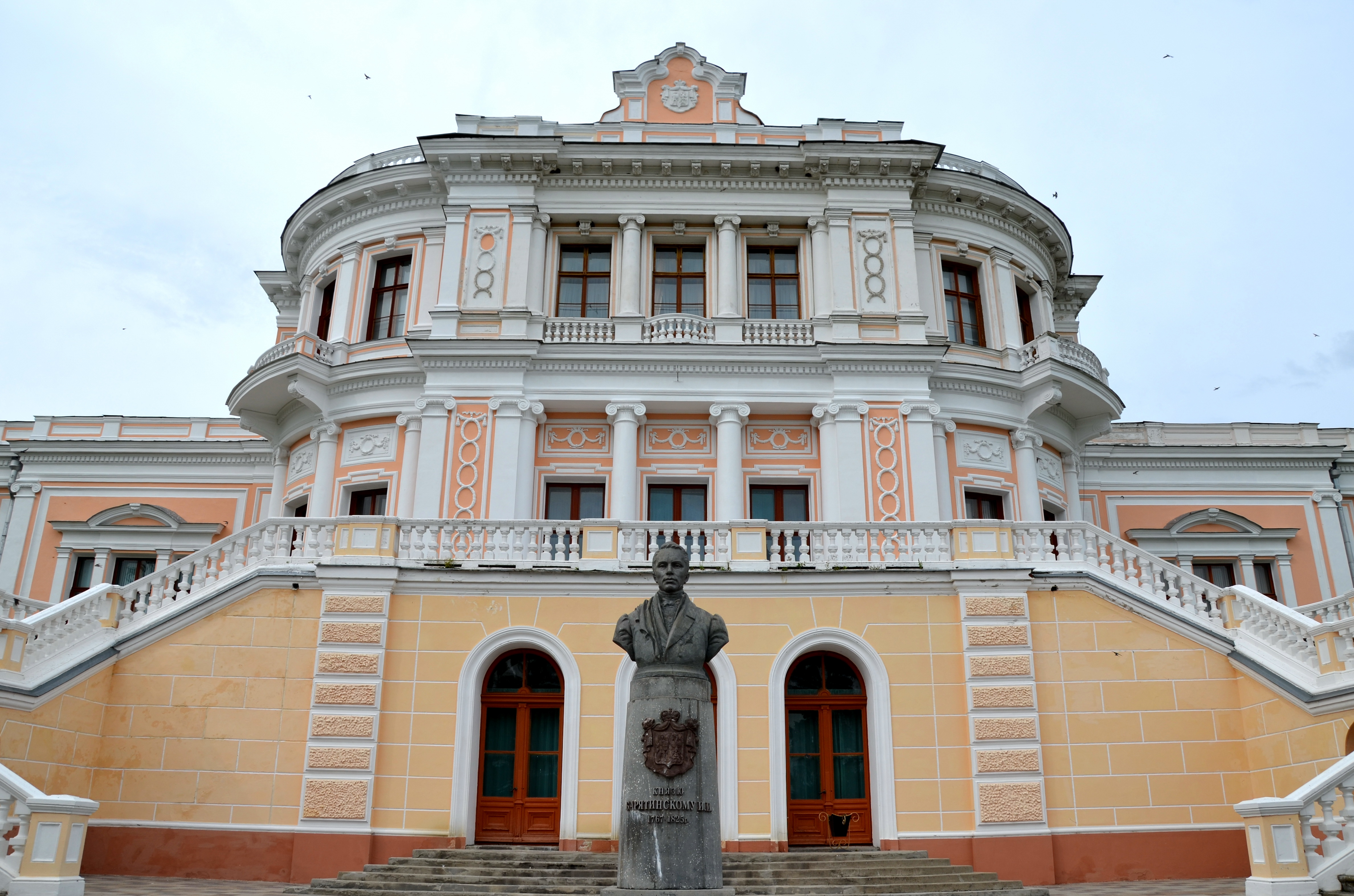
Monument to Baryatsky family

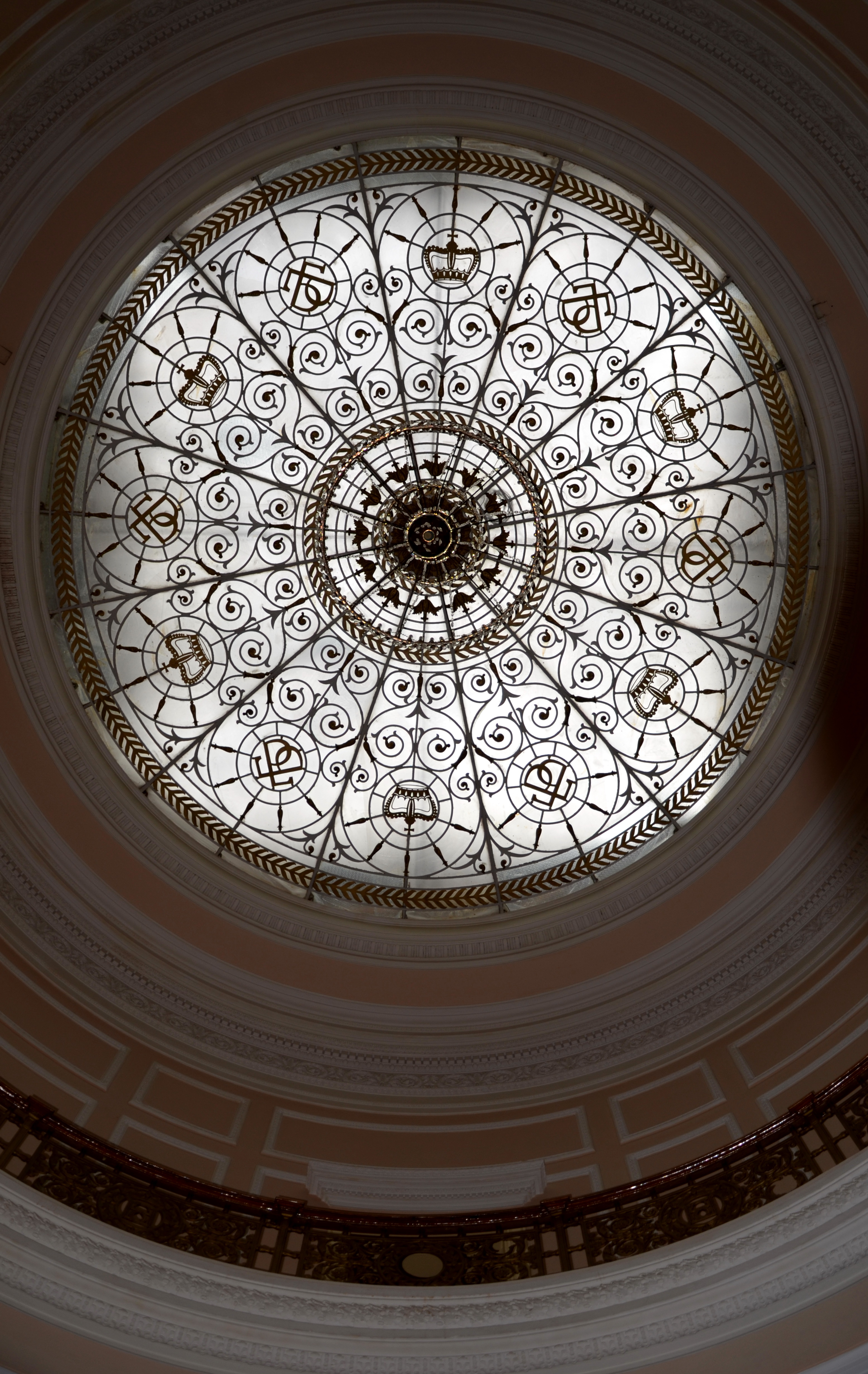
Ceiling of hall

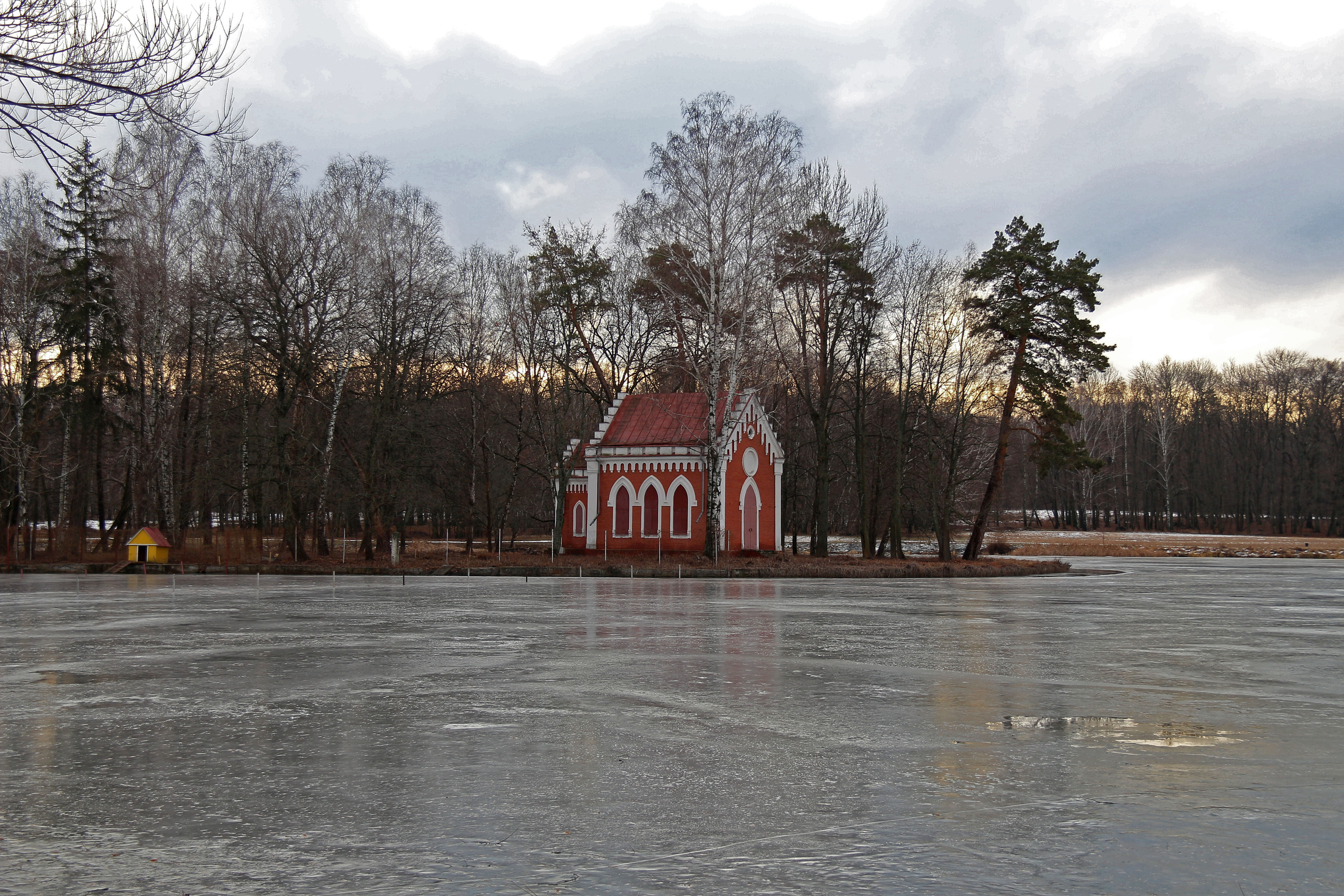
A park pavilion
