= List of equipment of the Korean People's Army Ground Force =

This is a list of equipment used by the Korean People's Army Ground Force.

== Personal Equipment ==
| Name | Country of origin | Image | Note |
Head Gear & Combat Helmet
| SSh-40 | Soviet Union | | Still in use. |
| PASGT-style | China | | Standard issue combat helmet. |
| FAST-style helmet | China Russia; North Korea | | Issued by special force members. |
| Ushanka | China Russia; North Korea | | Standard issue head gear for cold weather. |
| Field cap, Beret | North Korea | | Standard issue head gear for non-cold weather. |
| Peaked cap | North Korea | | |
Battle Dress Uniform (Camouflage)
| Army Officer Uniform | Democratic People's Republic of Korea | | Large amount. Still in use. |
| Woodland | United States Democratic People's Republic of Korea | | Standard issued BDU, similar to the former camouflage uniforms of the ROK Army. |
| Granite B-style | South Korea | | Unlicense copy. Some unit in KPA are issued, include the Special Force. Seen in 2022. |
| Multicam | United States | | Various. Seen in 2020. |
| EMR camouflage | Russia | | Seen in used by KPA troops on Russian Invasion of Ukraine. |

== Small arms ==
| Name | Country of origin | Image | Note |
Semi-automatic pistols
| Type 64 | North Korea | | Unlicensed copy of the FN Browning M1900. Can be fitted with a suppressor. Issued to high-ranking officers and spies. |
| Makarov PM | Soviet Union | | |
| Type 70 | North Korea | | Self-designed and produced; Modeled after the FN M1910, Makarov PM, and the Walther PPK; chambered in .32 ACP. Issued to high-ranking officers. |
| Baek-Du San | North Korea | | Unlicensed copy of the CZ 75 pistol. Replaced the Type 68 as the standard-issue pistol. |
| CZ 82 | Czechoslovakia | | Issued to spies with suppressors attached. |
| FN Baby Browning | Belgium | | Issued to spies with suppressors attached. |
| Inglis Hi-Power | Canada | | Canadian-made copies issued to spies and special forces commandos. |
Sub-machine guns
| PPS-43 | Soviet Union; China | | Both Soviet PPS submachine guns and Chinese Type 54s. |
| vz.61 | Czechoslovakia | | Used by spies. |
| Type 98 submachine gun | North Korea | | Resembles the PP-19-01 Vityaz and PP-19 Bizon but with an optical sight and a flash suppressor. Used by special forces. |
| Sterling | United Kingdom | | |
Shotguns
| KS-23 | Soviet Union | | |
| Vepr-12 | Russia | | Seen in use with North Korean troops in the Kursk region. |
Carbine
| Type 88 assault rifle | North Korea | | Resembles an AKS-74 but with a top-folding stock and has typically a helical magazine attached or in some cases a 30-round magazine. Preferred by mainly Special Operations Forces within the KPA |
| AK-105 | Russia; North Korea | | North Korean copy of the Russian AK-105 with a shortened 20-round magazine carrying 5.45×39mm ammunition. The furniture such as the pistol grip and the lightweight stock are made of plastic. Issued to armored crews. |
Assault rifles
| Type 56 | China | | Chinese copy of the AK-47. |
| Type 68 | North Korea | | North Korean copy of the AKM. |
| Type 88 | North Korea | | Unlicensed copy of the AK-74. It can use a 100 or 150-round helical magazine besides conventional 30-round box magazines. |
| AK-12 | Russia | | Seen in use with North Korean troops in the Kursk region. |
| Type 88 Bullpup | North Korea | | Bullpup Type weapon based on the Type 88-2 and ADS, Russian bullpup rifle chambered to fire the 5.45 mm round, fitted with a scope and a vertical handgrip. Issued to special force members |
| Unnamed OICW-type weapon type 88-3 | North Korea | | OICW-Type weapon based on the Type 88-2 chambered to fire the 5.45 mm round, as well as a 20 mm bullpup bolt-action over-barrel launcher with magazine containing around 5 rounds of programmable airburst grenades. |
| Norinco CQ | China | | Limited use, issued to special force members. |
| K2 | South Korea | | Limited use, unlicensed locally made copies, issued to special force members at least since 1990s. |
| M16A1 | United States | | Limited use, unlicensed locally made copies, issued to special force members. Seen in use by North Korean Commandos in the Gangneung incident in 1996. |
Sniper rifles
| Jeogyeok-Bochong Type 78 | North Korea | | Unlicensed version of the PSL rifle, some sources say it's a Zastava M76 copy, chambered in 7.62x54mmR. |
| Dragunov SVD | Soviet Union | | |
Machine guns
| RPD | Soviet Union | | Produced locally as the Type 62. |
| Type 64 | North Korea | | North Korean copy of the RPK machine gun, produced under license. |
| RPK-74 | Soviet Union | | |
| Type 73 | North Korea | | Indigenous design based on the ZB vz. 26 and the Kalashnikov PK machine gun design. Replaced by the Type 82 in service. |
| Gun-2 Minigun | North Korea | | Indigenous electric-powered Gatling-type gun, chambered to fire 7.62×54mmR. |
| Type 82 | North Korea | | North Korean copy of the PKM machine gun. Replaced the Type 73 as the KPA standard general-purpose machine gun. |
Heavy Weapons
| DShKM | Soviet Union; China | | Standard issue. The Chinese Type 54 machine gun is also used by the KPA. |
| NSV | Soviet Union | | |
| KPV | Soviet Union; China | | Chinese copies are also used by the KPA. |
Grenade launchers
| GP-25 | Soviet Union | | Underbarrel grenade launcher. Can be mounted on all Kalashnikov-type rifles. |
| AGS-17 | Soviet Union | | |
Flamethrowers
| ROKS-3 | Soviet Union | | |
Non-lethal
| ZM-87 | China | | Reported to have been used to illuminate two US Army Apache helicopters in 2003. |

== Armour ==
In 2024, the International Institute for Strategic Studies estimated that North Korea had more than 3,500 main battle tanks, 560 light tanks, and 2,500 armoured personnel carriers (both tracked and wheeled) in service.

| Name | Photo | Origin | Type | Quantity | Notes |
Tanks
| T-54/55 | | Soviet Union | Main battle tank | 1,000−1,600 | |
| Type 59 | | China | Main battle tank | 175 | |
| T-62 | | Soviet Union | Main battle tank | 800 | |
| Chonma-ho | | North Korea | Main battle tank | 1,000−1,400 | Locally produced T-62. |
| Pokpung-ho | | North Korea | Main battle tank | 100−250 | Based on the T-62, it incorporates technologies from the T-72 or T-90 tank. |
| Songun-915 | | North Korea | Main battle tank | Unknown | Based on the T-62 and T-72, upgraded with a 125 mm main gun, improved fire control systems, infrared sensors, and laser rangefinders. |
| Cheonma-2 | | North Korea | Main battle tank | At least 10 | |
| PT-76 | | Soviet Union | Amphibious light tank | 560+ | |
| M1985 | | North Korea | Amphibious light tank | 560+ | Similar to the PT-76, but uses the VTT-323 chassis. |
Armoured fighting vehicles
| BTR-80A | | Russia | Infantry fighting vehicle | 32 | |
| BTR-50 | | Soviet Union | Armoured personnel carrier | Unknown | |
| Type 63 | | China | Armoured personnel carrier | 500 | |
| VTT-323 | | North Korea | Armoured personnel carrier | Unknown | Based on the Type 63/YW531. |
| BTR-40 | | Soviet Union | Armoured personnel carrier | Unknown | |
| BTR-60 | | Soviet Union | Armoured personnel carrier | 1,200 | 500 BTR-60PA and 700 BTR-60PB in 2011. |
| BTR-152 | | Soviet Union | Armoured personnel carrier | Unknown | |
| M1992/1 | | North Korea | Armoured personnel carrier | Unknown | Based on the BRDM-2. |
| M2010 | | North Korea | Armoured personnel carrier | At least 10 | 6×6 and 8×8 versions based on the BTR-60 and BTR-80. |
| Unknown 8×8 APC | | North Korea | Armoured personnel carrier | Unknown | A 122 mm mobile gun system. |
| Bulsae-4 M-2018 | | North Korea | Non line of sight anti-tank guided missile carrier | Unknown | 6x6 vehicle equipped with non-ballistic missile system for armored targets and helicopters at long range (15-25 km) connected by trailing fiber-optic transmitting video back to vehicle. |

=== Vehicles ===
| Name | Type | Origin | Photo | In service | Notes |
Transportation and logistics
| UAZ-469 | Utility vehicle | Soviet Union | | | |
| Sungri 58 | 4×4 truck | North Korea | x | | Locally produced copy of the GAZ-51. |
| Isuzu | 6×6 truck | Japan | | | |
| Ural-375D | 6×6 truck | Soviet Union; North Korea | | | Locally produced copies. |
| ZIL-130 | 4×4 truck | Soviet Union | | | |
| ZIL-131 | 6×6 truck | Soviet Union | | | |
| Sinotruk HOWO | 6×6 truck | China | | | Civilian trucks converted for military use. |
| Taebaeksan 96 | Medium truck | North Korea | | Less than 50 | North Korean copy of the KAMAZ-58111, built in cooperation with KAMAZ. |
| ZIL-135 | Transporter erector launcher | Soviet Union | | | FROG-7 launcher. |
| MAZ-543 | Transporter erector launcher | Soviet Union; Russia | | | Imported from Russia. |
| WS51200 | Transporter erector launcher | China; North Korea | | 6 | Heavy civilian truck converted into a TEL. |

=== Artillery ===
In 2024, the IISS estimated that North Korea had more than 8,600 towed and self-propelled artillery pieces, 5,500 multiple rocket launcher systems, and 7,500 mortars in service.

| Name | Type | Photo | In service | Notes |
Self-propelled guns
| M-1992 | 120 mm SP gun-mortar | | | Turret mounted mortar on a VTT-323 chassis. |
| M-1977 | 122 mm SP howitzer | | | D-30 mounted on a tracked chassis. Maximum range 15.3 kilometres (9.5 mi) or 21.9 kilometres (13.6 mi) with rocket-assisted projectiles. |
| M-1981 | 122 mm SPG | | | Maximum range 24 kilometres (15 mi). |
| M-1985 | 122 mm SPG | | | A-19 mounted on a modified ATS-59 chassis. Maximum range 20.8 kilometres (12.9 mi). |
| M-1991 | 122 mm SPG | | | Maximum range 24 kilometres (15 mi). |
| M-1975 | 122 mm SPG | | | Maximum range 27.15 kilometres (16.87 mi). |
| M-1981 | 122 mm SPG | | | |
| M-1991 | 122 mm SPG | | | Maximum range 27.15 kilometres (16.87 mi). |
| M-1974 | 152 mm SP howitzer | | | Maximum range 17.4 kilometres (10.8 mi). |
| M-1977 | 152 mm SP howitzer | | | D-1 mounted on a Type 63 chassis. Maximum range 12.4 kilometres (7.7 mi). |
| Juche 107th Year Type 155 mm Self-propelled Howitzer | SP howitzer | | | 155 mm SPH, first publicly displayed in a 2018 military parade. Range estimated to be over 30 kilometres (19 mi). Range of 40 kilometers. Striking range at over 60 kilometers as stated by North Korea. On June 25, extended-range artillery shells were fired during testing with range of 65 kilometers. |
| M-1978 Koksan | 170 mm SPG | | | |
| Juche-po | 170 mm SPG | | | |
Towed guns
| D-30 | 122 mm howitzer | | | |
| D-74 | 122 mm field gun | | | |
| A-19 | 122 mm field gun | | | |
| M-46 | 130 mm field gun | | | |
| M-1937 | 152 mm gun-howitzer | | | |
| M-1938 | 152 mm howitzer | | | |
| M-1943 | 152 mm howitzer | | | |
Multiple rocket launchers
| Type 75 | 107 mm towed multiple rocket launcher | | | Locally produced Type 63 under license. Over 5,000 built for domestic and export markets. |
| VTT-323 107 mm | 107 mm SP multiple rocket launcher | | | Type 75 mounted on a Type 63 APC or VTT-323 chassis. |
| BM-11 | 122 mm SP multiple rocket launcher | | | 30-tube locally produced copy of the BM-21, mounted on a Ural-375D chassis. |
| M-1977 | 122 mm SP multiple rocket launcher | | | North Korean copy of the BM-21 Grad. |
| M-1985 | 122 mm SP multiple rocket launcher | | | 40-tube locally produced copy of the BM-21, mounted on an Isuzu 6×6 chassis. |
| M-1992 | 122 mm SP multiple rocket launcher | | | |
| M-1993 | 122 mm SP multiple rocket launcher | | | |
| VTT-323 122 mm | 122 mm SP multiple rocket launcher | | | |
| BMD-20 | 200 mm SP multiple rocket launcher | | | |
| BM-24 | 240 mm SP multiple rocket launcher | | | |
| M-1985 | 240 mm SP multiple rocket launcher | | | 12-tube launcher mounted on an Isuzu 6×6 chassis. |
| M-1989 | 240 mm SP multiple rocket launcher | | | |
| M-1991 | 240 mm SP multiple rocket launcher | | | Can fire unguided and guided rockets. |
| HIMARS-style | | | Multiple calibers, 122mm, 240mm and Hwasong-11D | Maximum range of 240mm rocket stated at 100 for ballistic trajectory and 115 kilometers for glided. |
| M-2015 (KN-09) | 300 mm SP multiple rocket launcher | | | Undergoing trials. |
| M-2019 (KN-25) | 600 mm SP multiple rocket launcher | | | Undergoing trials. |
Mortars
| 60mm mortar of type (A) | 60 mm mortar | | | |
| 82-BM-37 | 82 mm | | | |
| 120-PM-43 | 120 mm mortar | | | |
| 140mm mortar of 1982 model | 140 mm mortar | | | Derived from Chinese Type-76/W76 140mm mortar |
| M1943 | 160 mm mortar | | | |
Tactical ballistic missiles
| 2K6 Luna | Short-range ballistic missile | | 24 | FROG-3 and FROG-5 in service. |
| 9K52 Luna-M | Short-range ballistic missile | | 24 | |
| Hwasong-11D | Short-range ballistic missile | | 250 | Undergoing trials. |
| Hwasong-11 | Short-range ballistic missile | | | North Korean copy of the OTR-21 Tochka. |

== Anti-tank weapons ==
| Name | Quantity | Notes |
Man-portable anti-tank
| RPG-7 | | Locally produced as the Type 68. |
| RPG-29 | | |
Anti-tank guided missiles
| 3M6 Shmel | | |
| 9K111 Fagot | | |
| 9M113 Konkurs | | |
| Bulsae-2 | | North Korean copy of the 9K111 Fagot, it uses a laser guidance system. |
| 9M133 Kornet | | Produced locally as the Bulsae. |
Recoilless rifles
| B-10 recoilless rifle | 1,700 | |
Self-propelled anti-tank guided missiles
| 9P122 | | Armed with 9M14 Malyutka missiles. |
| M-2010 ATGM | | 8-tube launcher mounted on a M-2010 6×6 APC chassis. |

== Anti-aircraft weapons ==
In 2024, the IISS estimated that North Korea possessed more than 11,000 anti-aircraft guns in service.

| Name | Quantity | Note |
Man-portable air-defense systems
| 9K32 Strela-2 | | |
| 9K310 Igla-1 | | |
| HT-16 | | Indigenous design, it resembles the Igla-1 with elements from the 9K38 Igla and 9K338 Igla-S. |
| SA-18S | | Indigenous copy of the Igla-1, or the 9K38 Igla. |
Self-propelled anti-aircraft weapon
| 9K35 Strela-10 | | |
| M-1984 | | ZPU-4 gun mounted on a Chonma-ho chassis. Effective range 1.4 km (0.87 mi) |
| M-1992 23 mm | | Twin 23 mm guns mounted on a modified ATS-59 chassis. Effective range 2.5 km (1.6 mi) |
| M-1992 37 mm | | Twin 37 mm guns mounted guns possibly based on the M1939 mounted on a modified ATS-59 chassis. |
| M-1985 | | Twin 57 mm guns mounted on a modified Type 63/YW531 chassis. |
Towed anti-aircraft artillery
| ZPU | | ZPU-1, ZPU-2, and ZPU-4 variants used. Produced locally. |
| ZU-23-2 | 1,500 | |
| M1939 | 1,000 | |
| AZP S-60 | 600 | |
| KS-12 | 400 | Used with the 'Fire Can' radar. |
| KS-19 | 500 | |
