= Tanks of North Korea =

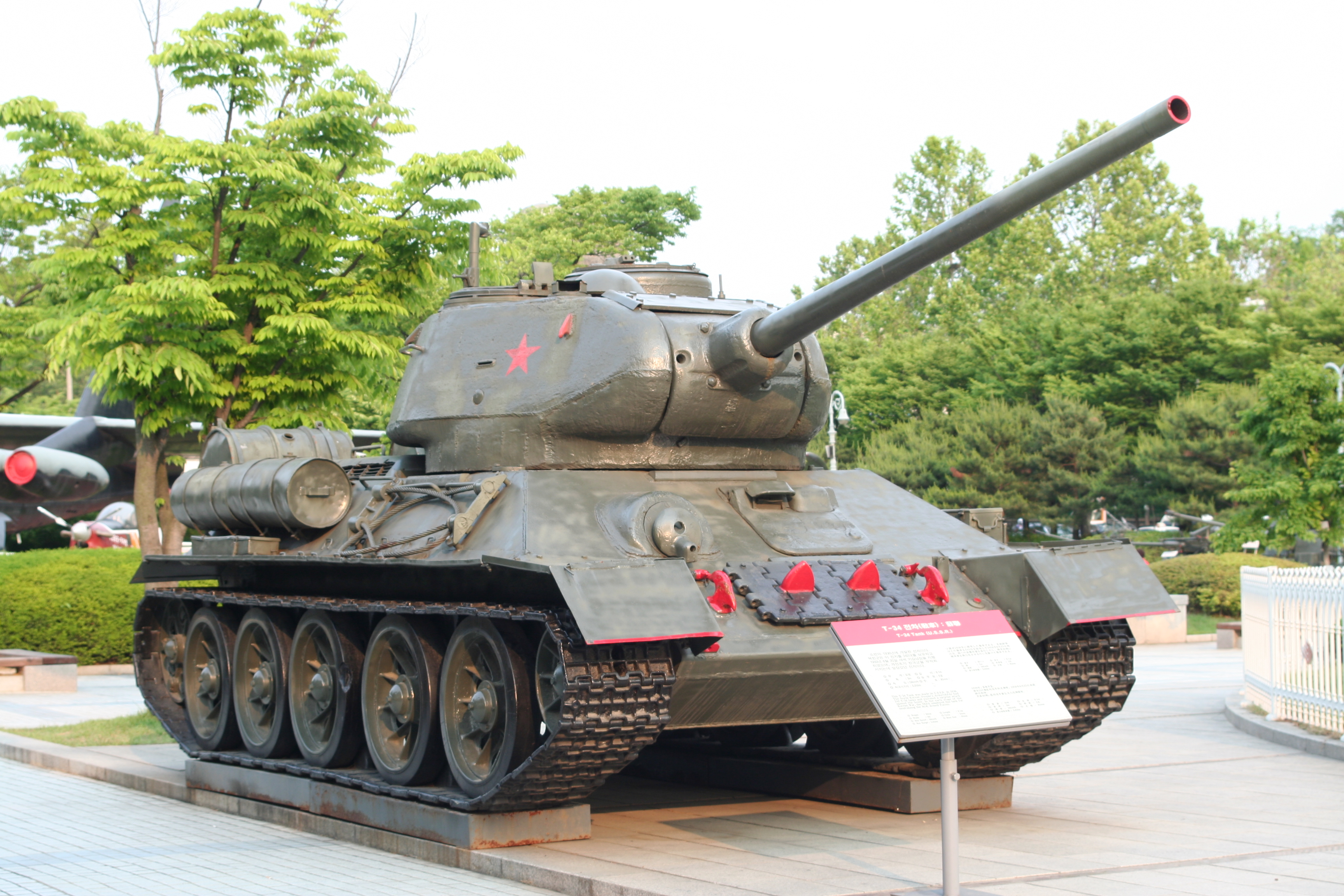
A T-34 tank of North Korea. The T-34-85 was the major tank used by the Korean People's Army in the Korean War.

The history and development of the tank in North Korea spans the period from their adoption after World War II with the foundation of the Korean People's Army, into the Cold War and the present. Over this period North Korea has moved from being an operator of Soviet-designed and produced tanks to being the manufacturer of its own tanks.

== Overview ==
=== History ===
On 9 August 1945, as agreed by the Allies at the Yalta Conference, the Soviet Union declared war on Japan and advanced into Korea. The US government requested that the Soviet advance stop at the 38th parallel. The US forces were to occupy the area south of the 38th parallel, including the capital, Seoul. This division of Korea into two zones of occupation was incorporated into General Order No. 1 which was given to Japanese forces after the surrender of Japan on 15 August. On 24 August, the Red Army entered Pyongyang and established a military government over Korea north of the parallel. American forces landed in the south on 8 September and established the US Army Military Government in Korea.

The Allies had originally envisaged a joint trusteeship which would steer Korea towards independence, but most Korean nationalists wanted independence immediately. Meanwhile, the wartime co-operation between the Soviet Union and the US deteriorated as the Cold War took hold. Both occupying powers began promoting into positions of authority Koreans aligned with their side of politics and marginalizing their opponents. Many of these emerging political leaders were returning exiles with little popular support. In North Korea, the Soviet Union supported Korean communists. Kim Il-sung, who from 1941 had served in the Soviet Army, became the major political figure. Society was centralized and collectivized, following the Soviet model. Politics in the South were more tumultuous, but the strongly anti-communist Syngman Rhee, who had been educated in the US, was positioned as the most prominent politician.

After World War II, tanks would not only continue to be produced in huge numbers, but the technology advanced dramatically as well. So the Soviets had many World War II tanks in large numbers and subsequently were able to supply North Korea with tanks. Just after World War II and during the Soviet Union's occupation of the part of Korea north of the 38th Parallel, the Soviet 25th Army headquarters in Pyongyang issued a statement ordering all armed resistance groups in the northern part of the peninsula to disband on 12 October 1945. Two thousand Koreans with previous experience in the Soviet army were sent to various locations around the country to organize constabulary forces with permission from Soviet military headquarters.

The headquarters felt a need for a separate unit for security around railways, and the formation of the unit was announced on 11 January 1946. That unit was activated on 15 August of the same year to supervise existing security forces and creation of the national armed forces.

Military institutes such as the Pyongyang Academy (became No. 2 KPA Officers School in Jan. 1949) and the Central Constabulary Academy (became KPA Military Academy in Dec. 1948) soon followed for education of political and military officers for the new armed forces.

After the military was organized and facilities to educate its new recruits were constructed, the Constabulary Discipline Corps was reorganized into the Korean People's Army General Headquarters. The previously semi-official units became military regulars with distribution of Soviet uniforms, badges, and weapons that followed the inception of the headquarters.

The State Security Department, a forerunner to the Ministry of People's Defense, was created as part of the Interim People's Committee on 4 February 1948. The formal creation of the Korean People's Army was announced on four days later on 8 February, the day after the Fourth Plenary Session of the People's Assembly approved the plan to separate the roles of the military and those of the police, seven months before the government of the Democratic People's Republic of Korea was proclaimed on 9 September 1948. In addition, the Ministry of State for the People's Armed Forces was established and began to set up armored forces.

The 105th Armored Division was North Korea's first armored unit and was established in October 1948 as the "105th Armored Battalion" and increased to regimental strength in May 1949. By June 1950, the "105th Armored Regiment" had become the "105th Armored Brigade" with a strength of 6,000 men and 120 Russian built T-34 tanks. North Korea also received 176 Su-76 self propelled guns, which although they were built for the antitank role, were used more as artillery.

==== Korean War ====
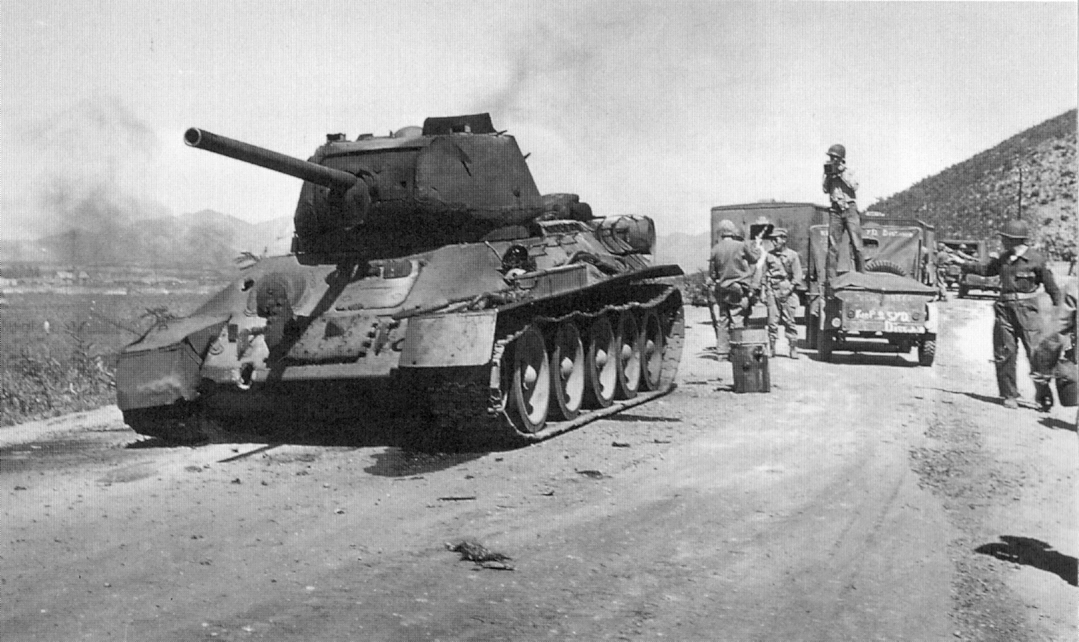
Knocked-out North Korean T-34/85s on a road from Incheon to Seoul during the Korean War in September 1950, after the US-led amphibious landings at Inchon. At least two penetrating hits can be seen on the front of the nearest T-34/85.

Before the outbreak of the Korean War, Joseph Stalin equipped the KPA with over 200 modern tanks such as the T-34, as well as trucks, artillery, and small arms (at the time, the South Korean Army had nothing remotely comparable either in numbers of troops or equipment). During the opening phases of the Korean War in 1950, the KPA quickly drove South Korean forces south and captured Seoul, with the tanks seeing little in the way of opposing tanks.

North Korean tanks, supported by heavy artillery, launched an attack along the 38th parallel. The South Koreans, lacking tanks, anti-tank weapons, or heavy artillery, were unable to mount an effective defense. Their forces, committed piecemeal, were routed within a few days. By early July, when U.S. forces arrived, the remaining South Korean troops were placed under the operational command of the United Nations Command.

During the Korean War, the tanks of North Korean 105th Armored Division was instrument as part of the North Korean advance from Seoul to Taejon and took part in the Battle of Osan against Task Force Smith and Battle of Chonan and subsequent Battle of Pusan Perimeter between August and September 1950. The 107th Tank Regiment, equipped with T-34 tanks, defeated Task Force Smith during the initial advances of the Korean People's Army. The regiment then fought with the rest of the division in the Battle of Pusan Perimeter.

It wasn't until U.S. forces armed with M4 Sherman medium tanks came into the Pusan port and later M26 Pershing tanks in the autumn after U.S. amphibious landings at the Battle of Incheon were North Korean tank forces to meet their match and be pushed back on the subsequent drive to the Yalu River.

After taking part in the Great Naktong Offensive, the 105th Armored Division was partly reconstituted and at the end of October and the first week of November 1950, it was committed to help the Chinese and used its tanks to provide fire support.

In the Korean War M24 Chaffee's were the first U.S. tanks to fight the North Korean T-34-85s. The M24 fared poorly against these North Korean tanks which were superior to the M24. M24s were more successful later in the war in their reconnaissance role, supported by heavier tanks such as the M4, M26, and M46.

The heavier but older M26 Pershing was deemed unsatisfactory due to its inferior mobility, which was unsuitable for a medium tank role as it used the same engine that powered the much lighter M4 Sherman, and in November, 1949, the upgraded M26 received a new power plant and a main gun with bore evacuator, and the M46 Patton designation. Less than a thousand were upgraded to M46 standard.

On 8 August 1950, the first M46 Pattons landed in South Korea and faced the North Korean tanks. The tank proved superior to the much lighter North Korean T-34-85, which were encountered in relatively small numbers. By the end of 1950, 200 M46 Pattons had been fielded, forming about 15% of US tank strength in Korea; the balance of 1,326 tanks shipped to Korea during 1950 were 679 M4A3 Shermans (including the M4A3E8 variant), 309 M26 Pershings, and 138 M24 Chaffee light tanks. Subsequent shipments of M46 and M46A1 Pattons allowed all remaining M26 Pershings to be withdrawn during 1951, and most Sherman equipped units were also reequipped.

British tanks also opposed the North Korean tanks, the Centurion tank with Cromwell tanks for reconnaissance, arrived in Korea in last months of 1950. The Centurions covered the retreat at the battle of the Imjin River with the tanks from C Squadron, 8th Hussars, under the command of Major Henry Huth and by 55 Squadron, Royal Engineers. The section of the UN line where the battle took place was defended primarily by British forces of the 29th Infantry Brigade, consisting of three British and one Belgian infantry battalions (Belgian United Nations Command) supported by the tanks and artillery. Despite facing a greatly superior enemy numerically, the brigade held its general positions for three days. When the units of the 29th Infantry Brigade were ultimately forced to fall back, their actions in the Battle of the Imjin River together with those of other UN forces, for example in the Battle of Kapyong, had blunted the impetus of the Chinese offensive and allowed UN forces to retreat to prepared defensive positions north of Seoul, where the Chinese were halted.

== Light tanks ==
=== PT-76 tank ===
The PT-76 (Not to be confused with Ob'yekt 906 or PT-85) is a Soviet amphibious light tank that was introduced in the early 1950s and soon became the standard reconnaissance tank of the Soviet Army and the other Warsaw Pact armed forces. Ordered in 1965, North Korea is believed to have around 500 in reserve.

=== Type 63 tank ===
The Norinco Type 63 (Chinese: 63式; pinyin: Liùsān shì) tanks which North Korea has, is a Chinese amphibious light tank. First fielded in 1963, it is in many ways similar to the earlier Soviet PT-76. However, contrary to the popular belief, it does have some essential differences from the PT-76 in the vehicle's waterjet propulsion system, etc. It is also known under its industrial designation, WZ211.

=== PT-85 tank ===
Light tanks such the PT-85, Model 1981 "Shin'heung" (Rise) is a North Korean produced amphibious light tank, based on the lengthened VTT-323 APC chassis, its resemblance to the PT-76 tank is vague, although the Korean light tank is clearly inspired by the Russian one that is still in service with their army. It has a higher turret compared to the PT-76, horseshoe-shaped, and armed with an 85 mm gun and hatches similar to those of a T-54. The hull of PT-85 becomes wider over the fenders, has sloped sides, driver moved on the right, plates are composed in a different way etc. It is armed with an 85 mm main gun and an ATGM launcher capable of firing 9M14M Malyutka ATGM. Like the original Soviet PT-76 and the Chinese Type 63 tank, the PT-85 is an example of a light amphibious tank.

=== SU-76M ===
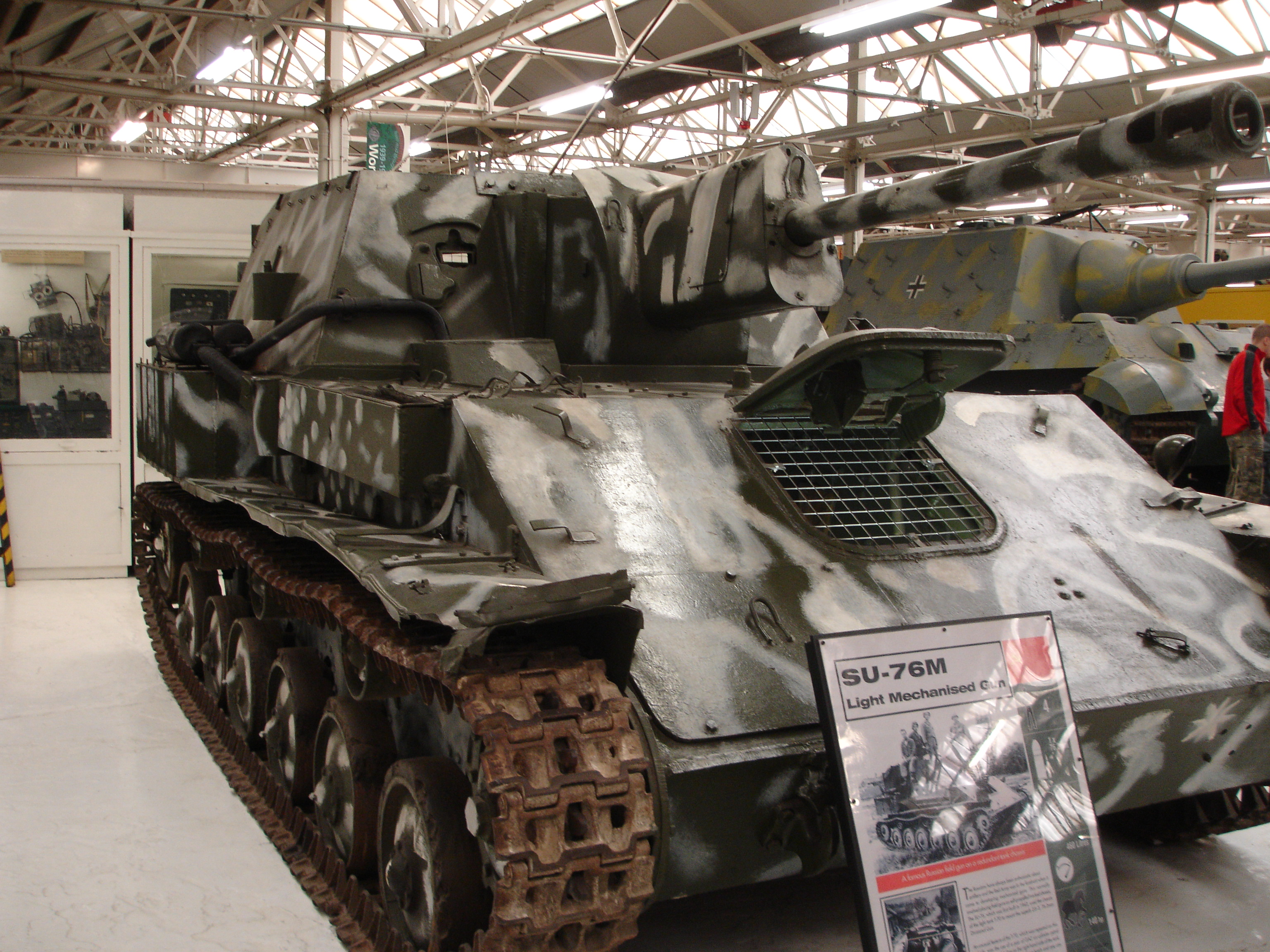
Soviet SU-76M captured from North Korea in 1950, now in Bovington tank museum

The SU-76M was used by Communist forces in the Korean War. The SU-76Ms was used as light artillery vehicles for bombardments and indirect fire support. A small number of SU-76Ms were captured and used by the South after the landing of Incheon. They were also used by the Russians during the Famous battle of Kursk during World War 2

The SU-76 (Samokhodnaya Ustanovka 76) was based on a lengthened and widened version of the T-70 light tank chassis. Its simple construction made it the second most produced Soviet armoured vehicle of World War II, after the T-34 tank.

The SU-76M thin armour and open top made it vulnerable to antitank weapons, grenades, and small arms. Its light weight and low ground pressure gave it good mobility. The SU-76M combined three main battlefield roles: light assault gun, mobile anti-tank weapon and mobile gun for indirect fire. The SU-76M had a large number of ammunition types. They included armour-piercing (usual, with ballistic nose and subcaliber hyper-velocity), hollow charge, high explosive, fragmentation, shrapnel and incendiary projectiles. This made the SU-76M an excellent multi-purpose light armoured fighting vehicle.

== Main battle tanks ==
=== T-34 ===
The North Koreans armored force in the Korean War consisted mostly of Soviet T-34-85 medium tanks. These former Soviet tanks were an effective weapon as the South Koreans had no tanks of their own. A full brigade equipped with around 120 T-34-85s spearheaded the invasion of South Korea in June 1950. The North Korean tanks had overwhelming early successes against South Korean infantry, Task Force Smith, and U.S. M24 Chaffee light tanks. The South Koreans had few weapons to defend against tanks, mostly the American M9A1 bazooka.

More tank engagements occurred with more T-34-85 tanks when China entered the conflict in February 1951 but because these tanks were dispersed with the infantry, tank to tank battles with UN forces were uncommon. A survey after the war concluded that there were 119 tank vs. tank actions involving U.S. Army and Marine units during the Korean War, with 97 T-34-85 tanks knocked out and another 18 probable. The M4A3E8 was involved in 50% of the tank actions, the M26 in 32%, and the M46 in 10%. The M26 and M46 proved to be an overmatch for the T-34-85 as their 90 mm HVAP round could punch all the way through the T-34 from the front glacis armour to the back, whereas the T-34-85 had difficulty penetrating the armour of the M26 or the M46. The M4A3E8, firing 76 mm HVAP rounds, was a closer match to the T-34-85 as both tanks could destroy each other at normal combat ranges.

T-34s that have remained in service have been upgraded with slat armour and T-55 style roadwheels.

=== T-54/55 ===
400 T-54s and 250 T-55s were ordered in 1966 from the Soviet Union and delivered between 1967 and 1970. 300 T-54s were ordered in 1967 from the Soviet Union and delivered between 1969 and 1974 (the vehicles were probably produced or assembled in North Korea). 50 T-55s were ordered in 1970 from the Soviet Union and delivered between 1972 and 1973. 500 T-55s were ordered in 1973 from the Soviet Union and delivered between 1975 and 1979 (The supplier may have been PRC in which case the vehicles wouldn't be T-55s but Type 59s). 19 T-55s were ordered from Russia and delivered in 1992 (the vehicles were delivered through Belarus). There were 1,600 T-54s in service in 1985, 1990, 1995 and 2000. There were 3,500 T-34s, T-54s, T-55s, T-62s and Type 59s in early 2001 through 2004, and more than 3,500 in 2006.

=== Type 59 ===
There were 175 Type 59s delivered to North Korea by China from 1973 to 1975 and 250 ZSU-57-2 turrets delivered by the Soviet Union in 1968-1977 and fitted to Type 59 hulls from China. 175 Type 59s in 1985 and 1990 and 500 in 2000; ~3500 T-34s, T-54s, T-55s, T-62s and Type 59s in 2004; and more than 3500 in 2006 through 2014.

Some 2000 T-55 and Type 59 Tanks are thought to currently be in service these can be equipped with spaced armor to defeat HEAT warheads.

=== T-62M ===
North Korea also received and built T62M tanks (Ob'yekt 166M) which is an extensive modernization of the T-62 with protection and mobility improvements and the "Volna" fire control system. It is fitted with a BDD appliqué armour package, an additional armour plate for anti-mine protection, 10 mm thick reinforced rubber side skirts and 10 mm thick anti-neutron liner. The BDD appliqué armour package was specially designed to defeat shaped charges (for example RPGs or HEAT warheads) and consists of an appliqué plate on the glacis and two horseshoe shaped blocks fitted to the front of the turret. The handrails around the turret have been removed to make space for the bra appliqué armour. Fastenings for four spare track chain links have been added on the side of the turret. The tank is fitted with RhKM tracks from the T-72 main battle tank and two additional shock absorbers on the first pair of roadwheels. The "Volna" fire control system was improved by fitting the KTD-2 (or KTD-1) laser rangefinder in an armoured box over the main armament. There is a new TShSM-41U gunner's sight, new commander's sight, "Meteor-M1" stabiliser, BV-62 ballistic computer and 9K116-2 "Sheksna" (NATO: AT-10 Stabber) guided missile unit with 1K13-BOM sight (it is both a night sight and ATGM launcher sight. However, it cannot be used for both functions simultaneously) which allows the tank to fire 9M117 Bastion ATGMs through its main gun.[15] The tank was fitted with a gun thermal sleeve, the better R-173 radio set instead of R-123M, a new V-55U diesel engine giving 620 hp (462 kW)which gives it a top speed of 50 km/h. The ammunition load was increased by two rounds. Some are fitted with two clusters of four smoke grenade launchers each on the right rear of the turret. The US intelligence saw T-62M main battle tanks for the first time during the Soviet war in Afghanistan and they gave it the designation T-62E. There are a number of sub-variants of the T-62M, depending on how much of the modernization package the vehicle has installed.

=== Chonma-ho ===
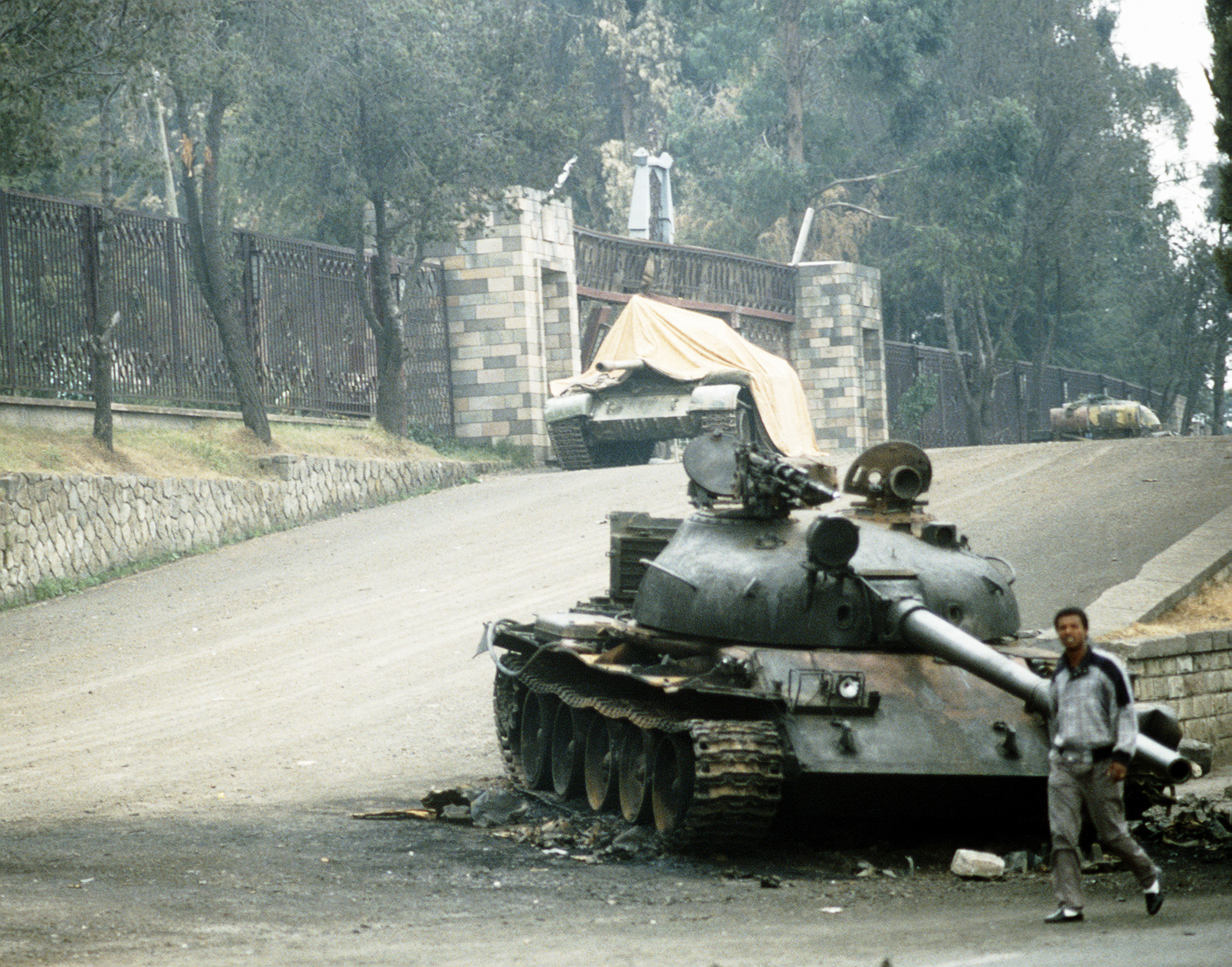
Destroyed Ch'ŏnma ho tank in capital city of Addis Ababa.

The Chonma-ho (Korean: 천마호; Hancha: 天馬號) is one of North Korea’s secretive indigenous main battle tank designs. The tank is also known by the name of 천리마 전차 (千里馬 or the "Chollima Tank"). The original Ch'ŏnma-ho is based on the Soviet T-62. There are at least five different versions of the Ch'ŏnma-ho. Since its inception, the Ch'ŏnma-ho has apparently undergone several extensive upgrades. Little public information is available about this tank, and its most recent public appearance was the 70th Anniversary Parade held in Pyongyang, North Korea, on 9 September 2018, celebrating the 70th anniversary of North Korea's foundation.

This designation also given to T-62 delivered from the Soviet Union. Officially, the Chonma-ho variants designated 4 are Chonma-92 and Chonma-98, while the vehicle generally known as Chonma-ho 5 is actually named Chonma-214.

=== Pokpung-ho series ===
==== Chonma-215 and Chonma-216 ====
The Pokpung-ho (Korean: 폭풍호; Hancha: 暴風號, officially Chonma-215 and Chonma-216) is a North Korean main battle tank developed in the 1990s. It is a locally designed main battle tank and contains elements or incorporates technology found in the T-62, T-72, Type 88 and Ch'onma-ho MBTs. Outside parties codename the tank M-2002 because the tank went through performance trials on February 16, 2002 (therefore being officially confirmed by outside sources), although the tank may have been in existence since 1992. The latest variant has a completely remotely controlled 9K38 Igla anti-aircraft defense system.

==== Songun-915 ====
The Songun-915 is a North Korean main battle tank which features a similar chassis with six wheels on each side when compared to the Pokpung-ho, but is fitted instead with a cast turret and the 2A46 125 mm gun. Some of these tanks are fitted with explosive reactive armor, and some are fitted with anti tank missiles and anti air missiles mounted atop the vehicle. This vehicle's design was first drafted in 2001 and finalised in 2009.

The P'okp'ung-ho series are only known to be used in North Korea.

=== Cheonma-2 ===
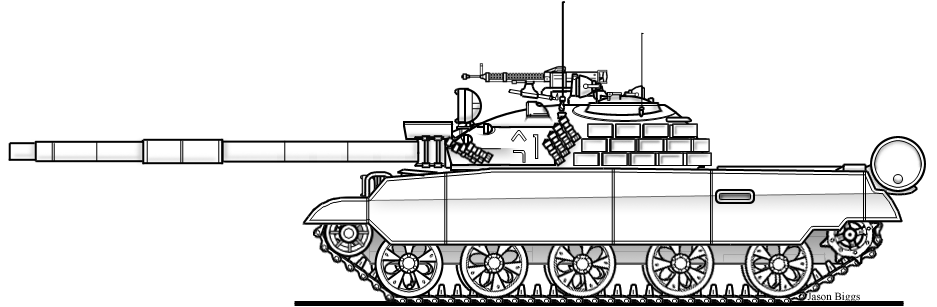
A conceptual drawing of the Ch'ŏnma-ho, with several upgrades, including the explosive reactive armour blocks at the back of the turret

A new prototype tank was seen on the 75th Party Foundation day parade in 2020 and the 8th Congress of the Workers' Party of Korea parade. The main difference of this vehicle are its seven suspension wheels and a design with strong resemblance to a M1 Abrams or the T-14 Armata. The tank was officially named "Cheonma-2" in a release by Korean Central Television, and features a hard-kill Active protection system, a four man crew, Explosive Reactive Armor, one piece ammunition, and possibly a new engine. The Cheonma-2 is a significant departure from previous KPA tanks, drawing more inspiration from tanks like the Zulfiqar and VT-4 than tanks like the T-72.

== See also ==
- History of the tank
- Tanks in World War II
- Tanks in the Cold War
- Tanks of the post–Cold War era
- List of main battle tanks by country
