= 15th Cabinet of North Korea =

Current government organization

- State Emblem

22 March 2026 – (212 days) Overview
- Type: Plenary Meeting of the Cabinet of North Korea
- Election: 1st Session of the 15th Supreme People's Assembly

The 15th Cabinet of North Korea was elected by the 1st Session of the 15th Convocation of the Supreme People's Assembly on 22 March 2026.

== Overview ==
The Second Economic Committee which is responsible for the defense industry was placed under the cabinet in a step seen by some analysts as a move to further strengthen the Cabinet responsibility across the economy. A new position was created in the cabinet, First Vice Premier with Kim Tok-hun appointed to the position. The Ministry of Shipbuilding Industry, previously a Cabinet department, has been renamed the Ministry of Shipbuilding Industry under the Second Economic Committee.

== Composition ==
As of 22 March 2026, the Cabinet consists of the following members:

Position	Minister	Political party	Took office	Ref
Premier	Pak Thae-song	Workers' Party	29 December 2024	
First Vice Premier	Kim Tok-hun	Workers' Party	22 March 2026	
Vice Premier and Chairman of the State Planning Commission	Pak Jong-gun	Workers' Party	17 January 2021	
Vice Premier	Jon Hyon-chol	Workers' Party	22 March 2026	
Vice Premier	Pak Hun	Workers' Party	22 March 2026	
Vice Premier	Ri Kyong-il	Workers' Party	22 March 2026	
Vice Premier	Kim Chang-sok	Workers' Party	22 March 2026	
Vice Premier	Jon Sung-guk	Workers' Party	8 June 2022	
Vice Premier and Chairman of the Agricultural Commission	Ri Chol-man	Workers' Party	30 December 2023	
Minister of Foreign Affairs	Choe Son-hui	Workers' Party	8 June 2022	
Minister of Public Security	Pang Tu-sop	Workers' Party	30 July 2024	
Secretary General of the Cabinet	Kim Kum-chol	Workers' Party	17 January 2021	
Minister of Metallurgical Industry	Kim Kwang-nam	Workers' Party	22 March 2026	
Minister of Chemical Industry	Kim Son-myong	Workers' Party	January 2026	
Minister of Electric Power Industry	Kim Yu-il	Workers' Party	17 January 2021	
Minister of Coal Industry	Ri Yong-chol	Workers' Party	22 March 2026	
Ministry of Railways	Kim Ha-gyu	Workers' Party	22 March 2026	
Minister of Land and Maritime Transport	Jo Jong-ryong	Workers' Party	22 March 2026	
Minister of Mining Industry	Ri Sang-do	Workers' Party	30 December 2023	
Minister of Natural Resources Development	Kwon Song-hwan	Workers' Party	29 December 2024	
Minister of Forestry	Han Yong-ho	Workers' Party	22 March 2026	
Minister of Machine-Building Industry	Ri Kwang-nam	Workers' Party	22 March 2026	
Minister of Nuclear Power Industry	Wang Chang-uk	Workers' Party	11 April 2019	
Minister of Shipbuilding at the Second Economy Commission	Kim Kwang-il	Workers' Party	22 March 2026	
Minister of IT Industry	Ju Yong-il	Workers' Party	17 January 2021	
Minister of Construction and Building-Materials Industry	So Jong-jin	Workers' Party	17 January 2021	
Minister of State Construction Control	Yang Ki-song	Workers' Party	22 March 2026	
Minister of Light Industry	Ri Yong-gun	Workers' Party	22 March 2026	
Minister of Regional Industry	Kim Chol-bom	Workers' Party	22 March 2026	
Minister of Fisheries	Yun Song-chol	Workers' Party	22 March 2026	
Minister of Finance	Ri Myong-guk	Workers' Party	1 July 2024	
Minister of Labor	Jin Kum-song	Workers' Party	17 January 2021	
Minister of External Economic Relations	Yun Jong-ho	Workers' Party	17 January 2021	
Chairman of the State Commission of Science and Technology	Kim Song-bin	Workers' Party	8 October 2024	
President of the State Academy of Sciences	Kim Sung-jin	Workers' Party	29 December 2019	
Minister of Land and Environment Protection	Yang Yong-jin	Workers' Party	22 March 2026	
Minister of Urban Management	Kim Son-il	Workers' Party	22 March 2026	
Minister of Disaster Management	Kim Chol-nam	Workers' Party	22 March 2026	
Minister of Grain Administration	Kim Kwang-jin	Workers' Party	27 September 2023	
Minister of Commerce	Kim Yong-sik	Workers' Party	29 December 2024	
Minister of Education	Kim Chol-nam	Workers' Party	22 March 2026	
Minister of Public Health	Kim Tu-won	Workers' Party	22 March 2026	
Minister of Culture	Hyon Un-chol	Workers' Party	22 March 2026	
Minister of Physical Culture and Sports	Kim Il-guk	Workers' Party	December 2016	
President of the Central Bank	Paek Min-gwang	Workers' Party	27 September 2023	
Director of the Central Bureau of Statistics	Ri Chol-san	Workers' Party	17 January 2021	
