= Cheonma-2 =

North Korean main battle tank

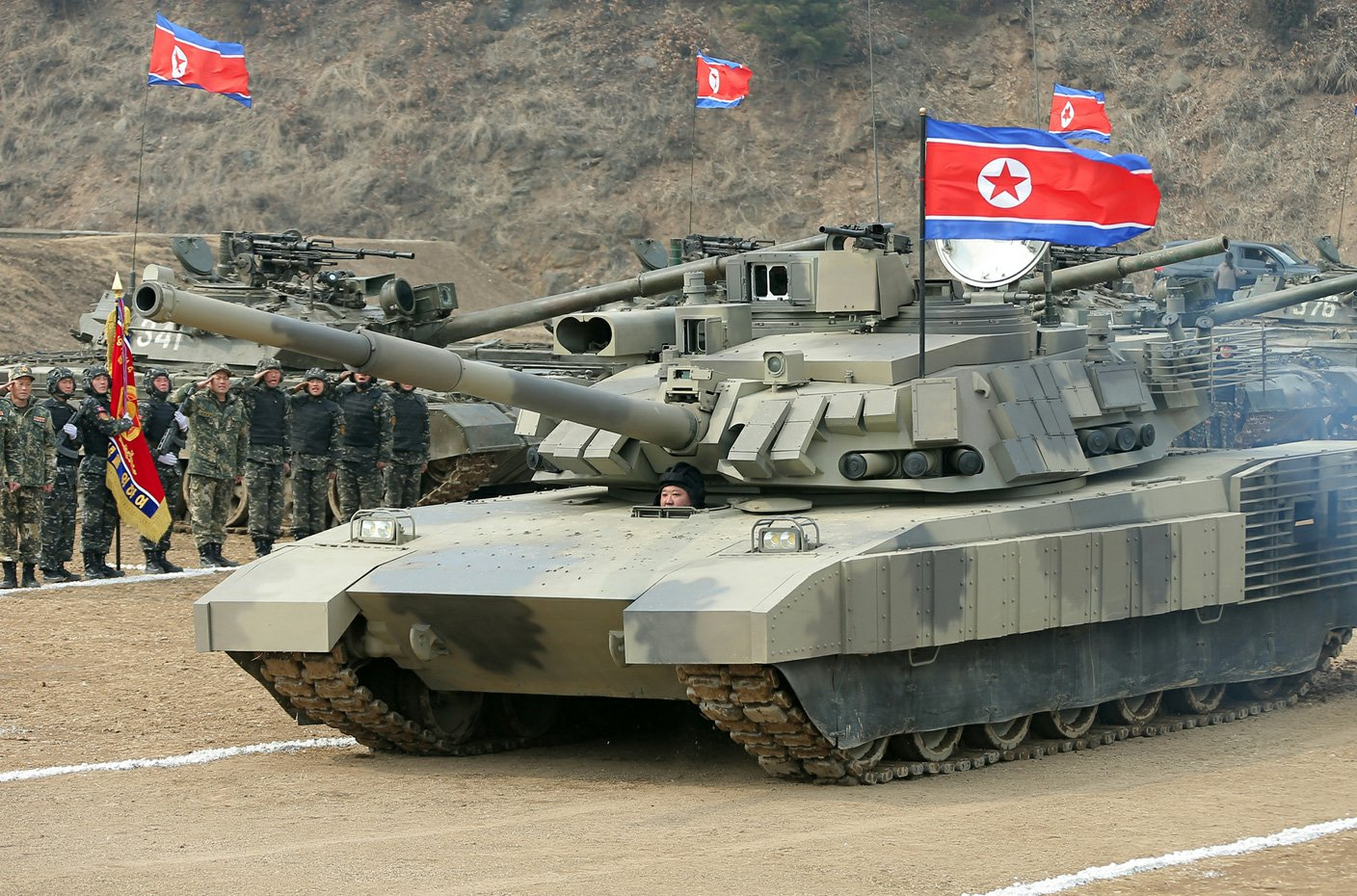
- Type: Main battle tank
- Place of origin: North Korea

Service history
- In service: 2020–present
- Used by: Korean People's Army Ground Force

Production history
- No. built: Allegedly 14, with mass production believed to be planned
- Variants: see variants below

Specifications
- Mass: >50, 55 t
- Crew: 4
- Armor: composite armour, explosive reactive armour, Afghanit-type/GL6-type active protection system
- Main armament: 1x 125mm main gun derived from Russian 2A46
- Secondary armament: 1x AGS-30 automatic grenade launcher 1x coaxial 7.62mm machine gun 2x Bulsae-3 anti-tank missiles
- Engine: diesel 1 200 h.p.

The Cheonma-2 (Chonma-2, Ch'ŏnma-2, Korean:천마-2호, previously classified as M2020 or M2024 by foreign intelligence) is a North Korean 3rd generation main battle tank unveiled during the October 2020 military parade that commemorated the 75th anniversary of the foundation of the Workers' Party.

== Background ==
North Korea originally relied on Soviet and Chinese made tanks before they started developing their own tanks, starting with the Cheonma-ho tank.

Newer Cheonma-216 and Songun-Ho tanks would be developed and introduced in the early 21st century but were still heavily influenced by old Soviet/Russian and Chinese tank designs; namely by the T-62.

At the beginning of the 21st century, North Korea was able to obtain T-72 tanks through various channels and various parts of it, which would be used in the development of their tanks, such as with the Songun-Ho.

In 2016, a tank commander in North Hamgyong Province claimed a K1 88-Tank was at a tank research center in North Korea, but the Republic of Korea Armed Forces denied such a claim.

== History ==
On October 10, 2020, the DPRK held a rare night time military parade to celebrate the 75th anniversary of the Workers' Party of Korea's foundation. During the parade, nine of the new tanks were unveiled, alongside new armored fighting vehicles, rocket artilleries, and ballistic missiles, such as the Hwasong-16 and Pukguksong-4 missiles. The tanks displayed were stated to be prototypes.

As of March 2024, 9 are known to exist in the updated M2024 standard, but mass production is believed to be planned at the Kusong tank plant.

On May 4, 2025, the Korean Central News Agency released photos of Kim Jong Un inspecting and touring a factory making Cheonma-2 tanks. At least 5 tanks could be seen fully completed.

== Design ==
=== General layout and armor ===
Visually, the Cheonma-2 appears to be a mixed design of the American M1 Abrams and the Russian T-14 Armata or Iranian Zulfiqar tank, although its overall layout is more similar to the latter. The front of the turret's armor is angled similarly to the M1 Abrams. The hull of the tank features armor plates on the sides, with slat armor on the rear sides protecting the engine just like the T-14. The glacis plate of the Cheonma-2 is slightly different from the T-14 and the driver's position is located at the center front of the hull. The tank is equipped with composite armor that is believed to be on par with ones equipped on third generation main battle tanks and is possibly modular in design. Parts of the turret appear to have armor up to 10 cm thick to defend against top attack munitions. Compared to the Songun-Ho tank, the commander sits in the right side of the turret. The change in position may indicate an addition of an autoloader inside the turret, but the 4th crew member makes this unlikely. The tank has seven road wheels, indicating that it is bigger than previous North Korean tanks (which have six wheels). These road wheels are protected by rubber plates or skirts. During a parade on July 27, 2023, the tank was seen with additional explosive reactive armor: turret ERA design and placement looks similar to that of Kontakt-5, while hull sides are provided with larger modules of unknown ERA type. This design was dubbed as M2023. In November, 2024, a new version of the tank was revealed, featuring composite armor modules for the turret, and new hull sides ERA, dubbed as M2024.

=== Armament ===
The tank's main gun is likely derived from the Soviet 2A46 125mm gun, which are also used on the Songun-Ho tanks. A coaxial machine gun is located left of the main gun and an AGS-30 grenade launcher is located on the left side of the roof of the turret.^{Note 1} The tank also has two Bulsae-3 anti-tank missiles in a folding launcher on the right side of the turret. The Bulsae-3 missiles are said to be reversed engineered Soviet/Russian 9K111 Fagot or 9M133 Kornet missiles. However, the diameter of the ATGM launchers appears to be 150 mm like the 9M133, rather than 120 mm of the 9K111 and thus have a higher penetration. As the T-72s received by North Korea are of early modifications, they cannot fire missiles through the gun barrel, although gun-launched missiles are constrained by the barrel diameter and have less penetration. The May 2025 version was revealed to have a longer barrel.

Given that the tank uses one piece ammunition, it is also possible that the gun is a smaller 115mm gun with a longer caliber to compensate for the lower penetration of this caliber. However, detailed information was censored in the footage released by Korean Central Television.

=== Mobility ===
The Cheonma-2 was believed to powered by a 1 200 horsepower engine used on the Songun-Ho tanks, but stills of the engine shown during the May 28, 2024 visit to Academy of National Defense Science show visual similarities to the engine of the Leopard 2, casting this assumption in doubt. The estimated mass of the tank is 55 tons, or above 50 tons. The tank is noted to be relatively compact in size, which is advantageous for armored fighting vehicles traversing hilly and mountainous terrains, such as the geography of the Korean Peninsula.

=== Sensors and countermeasures ===
The roof of the turret features panoramic sights and a meteorological mast on the right side, and smoke grenade launchers at the rear of the turret protected by slat armor. The commander and gunner have separate sights, which are believed to have thermal imaging devices. If true, then it would improve the tank's hunter-killer and night fighting capabilities compared to older North Korean tanks. The tank possesses a muzzle reference system to improve its accuracy when firing on the move. Hard kill active protection systems (APS) are fitted on the lower part of the turret; two in the front corners and two on each side, each containing three tube launchers. This APS layout is similar to the Russian Afghanit featured on the T-14. The sensors used for the active protection systems are likely located in the front corners of the turret. This design is similarly seen on the M1A2C (SEPv3). KCTV has published footage of the APS intercepting an RPG-7 style round at the testing grounds in Kusong at the “Weapons and Equipment Exhibition 2023” in Pyongyang, which Joost Oliemans of Oryx has called "a laudable achievement for North Korean engineers". November 2024 version featured new hard-kill active protection system similar to the Chinese GL6 used on upgraded ZTZ-99A tanks (however, featuring four counter-projectile tube launchers instead of two, per one module), which was installed in exchange for Afghanit-type APS of an earlier model.

== Variants overview ==
=== Cheonma-2 (2020) ===
Earlier known as M2020, it is the base production variant presented in October 2020, with mass rated at above 50 tons, or at 55 tons, with 125mm gun, AGS-30 grenade launcher, 7.62mm co-axial light machine gun, Bulsae-3 ATGM launcher, composite armor, Afghanit-type APS, 1 200 h.p. diesel engine.

=== Cheonma-2 (2023) ===
Earlier known as M2024 , it is identical to the 2020 model with addition of turret (presumably Kontakt-5) and hull ERA. Was presented in July, 2023.

=== Cheonma-2 (2024) ===
Referred to as Tianma-2, it is seen as a demonstration prototype presented in November 2024 featuring new turret composite armor, new hull ERA, and GL6-type APS.

=== Cheonma-2 (2025) ===
Referred to as Chonma-20- identical to 2024 prototype, but featuring longer gun. New production variant presented in May, 2025.

== Reactions ==
While the biggest highlight of the 75th anniversary Worker's Party parade was the unveiling of the Hwasong-16 ballistic missile, the appearance of the Cheonma-2 has also taken observers and defense experts by surprise.

The Cheonma-2 is strikingly distinct in that it does away with the older T-62 design in many preceding North Korean tanks in favor of a more modern design. As such, the tank has been compared to the American M1A2 Abrams, the Russian T-14 Armata, and to some extent, the Chinese VT-4.

There is speculation that the Cheonma-2 may have been assisted by Russian or Chinese technological transfers due to its very modern design.

The nine tanks displayed at the military parade are believed to be prototypes or proof of concept intended for future development or production in the future.

Curiously, the Cheonma-2 sported a desert tan camouflage scheme during the military parade, which is unusual considering there are no deserts in the Korean Peninsula.

The choice of color is speculated to be intended for the tank to be compared to Western, Russian, and/or Chinese tanks or to be appealing as an exportable weapon. The Cheonma-2 is stated to be a testament to the North Korean defense industries' ingenuity despite being under an arms embargo and international sanctions.

The Cheonma-2s (along with other paraded weapons) are also seen as North Korea's efforts to modernize its military.

In an interview with Professor Sung Woo, the head of the Department of Military Drones at Shinhan University and a former policy advisor to the Joint Chiefs of Staff (South Korea), he stated the Cheonma-2 is a technological leap over existing North Korean tanks.

He also stated that the tank's development may have been assisted by Iran by using technologies and designs from the Zulfiqar-3 tank. North Korea and Iran are known to cooperate with regards to their militaries.

Professor Sung Woo has implied that the Cheonma-2 may be classified as somewhere between a third and fourth generation main battle tank based on comparisons to older North Koreans and modern foreign tanks.

He concluded that the Cheonma-2 can become a serious threat to the K1 and the K2 tanks and that the South Korean military should improve networking capabilities and develop active protection systems to counter the Cheonma-2s.

There are doubts over the design and capabilities of the Cheonma-2. While it is believed to be a leap over predecessor tanks, the Cheonma-2 is likely nowhere near as advanced as the M1 Abrams or the T-14 Armata.

It is unknown if sensors, communication, networking, and composite armor technologies seen in advanced third and fourth generation main battle tanks are present in the Cheonma-2s.

== Notes ==
1.This tank adopted several characteristics from the Pokpung-ho tank variant called Chonma-216 that was unveiled in 2017. Chonma-216 featured a 125 mm main gun based on the Russian 2A46, dual AGS-30 grenade launchers on the roof of the turret, and two Bulsae-3 anti-tank missiles on the side.
