= 2020 North Korean missile tests =

Throughout 2020, four missile tests were conducted by North Korea. Given the joint statement signed by North Korea and the United States at their summit in 2018, in which North Korea pledged to work towards the complete denuclearization of the Korean Peninsula, these tests raised concerns among the United States, Japan, and South Korea regarding regional security on the Korean Peninsula. They have also drawn attention from other Asia-Pacific countries to developments on the Korean Peninsula.

== Background ==
On 21 April 2018, the North Korean government announced a temporary halt to its nuclear and missile tests, and held three summits between 2018 and 2019: the Singapore Summit, the Hanoi Summit, and the Panmunjom Trilateral Talks. Subsequently, on 1 January 2020, North Korean leader Kim Jong Un announced that he would no longer abide by his commitment to suspend nuclear and missile tests and warned the United States that North Korea would take action if it did not soften its position in the nuclear negotiations.

== Tests ==
=== 2 March ===
On 2 March, the Choson Shinbo, the official newspaper of the General Association of Korean Residents in Japan, stated regarding the relationship between North Korea and the United States that "the North Korean authorities possess an invincible military force that no one can violate, and will continue to strengthen it in the future," and indicated that the North Korean authorities will continue to strengthen their military forces in the future. On the same day, the Joint Chiefs of Staff of South Korea stated that it had observed the North Korean authorities launching two unidentified objects from Wonsan into the Sea of Japan. This was the first time the North Korean authorities had launched a projectile in 2020. The Republic of Korea Armed Forces and the US Forces Korea collected detailed intelligence on the launch and conducted an analysis. The Japan Self-Defense Forces also stated that it estimated the unidentified object flew more than 230 kilometers and will do its best to search for and analyze relevant information to ensure the safety of the lives and property of the Japanese people.

In response, South Korea's Office of National Security and relevant ministries held an emergency meeting at 1:30 p.m. that day. Japanese Prime Minister Shinzo Abe told the House of Councillors Budget Committee that this matter is a serious issue for the international community, including Japan. The Japanese Ministry of Defense said that there was no indication that any flying objects fell in the Sea of Japan or its exclusive economic zone. The Ministry of National Defense of South Korea pointed out that the two unidentified objects were likely short-range ballistic missiles developed by North Korea, and said at a press conference that the two missiles were launched through a mobile TEL missile launcher, and that it would study their models and capabilities with the US military. Zhao Lijian, spokesperson for the Ministry of Foreign Affairs of China, presided over a regular press conference and said that the two Koreas should start dialogue and consultation to resolve the issue, and reiterated the Chinese government's position on North Korean denuclearization and on promoting peace on the Korean Peninsula.

Regarding the actions of the North Korean authorities, the ruling Democratic Party stated that not only the two Koreas, but the whole world is working to prevent the spread of the coronavirus, and the North Korean authorities' unilateral actions to protect their rights at this time are wrong. The opposition United Future Party stated that the two Koreas should cooperate on healthcare systems. The Justice Party pointed out that the North Korean authorities should not reject the goodwill shown by the South Korean government and pointed out that the South Korean authorities should propose solutions in addition to active cooperation. The People's Party stated that as members of the same nation, they should not cause tension on the Korean Peninsula, and the actions of the North Korean authorities cannot avoid isolation and criticism from the international community.

US Secretary of State Mike Pompeo said that the North Korean authorities should abide by their previous commitments and reiterate the US position. In response, former US National Security Advisor John Bolton condemned the North Korean authorities, saying that, as expected, the North Korean authorities violated the United Nations Security Council resolutions by restarting ballistic missile tests. He also condemned the US government via Twitter, saying that it should face up to the reality that the North Korean authorities have not given up nuclear weapons development. When asked about this matter at a regular press conference, US President Donald Trump did not express an opinion, showing his indifference to the matter.

The South Korean Ministry of Unification expressed regret over the matter at its regular press conference on 3 March, and stated that the South Korean authorities had taken special security measures for the 2,000 North Korean defectors in response to the epidemic. It is understood that the US military stationed in South Korea dispatched a Boeing RC-135 reconnaissance aircraft on 1 March for a three-day flight over the Korean Peninsula, presumably to monitor the relevant movements of the North Korean authorities and to issue a warning to the North Korean authorities. It is understood that the US Navy dispatched a Lockheed P-3 Orion maritime patrol aircraft to fly over South Korea on 29 February.

In response to the Blue House's concerns, Kim Yo Jong, the deputy director of the Propaganda and Agitation Department of the Workers' Party of Korea, expressed surprise. Regarding the previous artillery training, she said that “the North Korean authorities did not train to threaten anyone” and that “the joint military exercises between South Korea and the United States, originally scheduled for March, were postponed because of the outbreak of the COVID-19 pandemic in South Korea, not because of the Blue House's voluntary decision”. She also pointed out that “South Korea can train its own troops, but North Korea cannot” is illogical. In addition, Kim Yo Jong said that the Blue House's statement would deepen the North's distrust of the South, but she was glad that the Blue House did not directly state the position of South Korean President Moon Jae-in. This time, Kim Yo Jong, as Kim Jong Un's sister, spoke to the outside world in her own name. This was the first time that a female politician from the Kim family had spoken to the outside world since the Kim family came to power in North Korea. Kim Jong Un's aunt, Kim Kyong-hui, when she served as the director of the Organization and Guidance Department of the Workers' Party of Korea, rarely spoke to the outside world in her own name.

On 5 March, Kyodo News reported that the United Kingdom, France, and Germany requested the United Nations Security Council to hold an emergency meeting to discuss the response and adjustment of relevant policies. On the same day, the Japan Air Self-Defense Force demonstrated the mobile deployment training of the Patriot 3 (PAC-3) surface-to-air interceptor missile to the media at the Ground Self-Defense Force Itami Base in Itami, Hyōgo Prefecture. This was also the first time that Japan had conducted training in the Kansai region to prepare for the launch of ballistic missiles by North Korea. After the emergency meeting, the United Kingdom, France, Germany, Belgium, and Estonia issued a joint statement stating that the actions of the North Korean authorities undermined international security and peace, as well as regional stability and security, and called on North Korea to conduct meaningful negotiations with the United States on the denuclearization of North Korea. It is understood that the statement was a common position of Europe, rather than a resolution of the Security Council. Regarding the common position of the five European countries, the North Korean Ministry of Foreign Affairs stated at a press conference that the statement was a reckless action instigated by the United States and that it could trigger a major reaction from the authorities.

=== 9 March ===
On 9 March, the South Korean Joint Chiefs of Staff stated that the North Korean authorities launched three unidentified projectiles from the Sundeok Airfield toward the Sea of Japan, marking North Korea's second test launch in a week. In response, the South Korean government stated that the military is currently monitoring the situation and maintaining a state of alert. The Blue House also held an emergency video conference with the Ministry of National Defense and the National Intelligence Service of South Korea to analyze the intentions of the North Korean authorities and the deployment of South Korean troops, and stated that the large-scale joint strike training exercise related to the North Korean authorities is not helpful for peace on the Korean Peninsula.

In response to the North Korean authorities' missile launch, the ruling Democratic Party expressed regret that such an event occurred after Kim Jong Un sent a personal letter to Moon Jae-in. Meanwhile, the opposition United Future Party criticized the North Korean authorities via Facebook, saying that they were taking advantage of the South Korean authorities' suffering from the epidemic and mocking the South Korean people, and demanded that the South Korean government respond in a fair and square manner. The People's Party expressed strong condemnation and called on the South Korean government to respond decisively. The Justice Party pointed out that it was worrying that such an event occurred within five days of the personal letter being delivered to South Korea. The People's Party stated that the North Korean authorities should fight the epidemic together with the international community instead of engaging in reckless provocations.

The Japanese government said it is conducting intelligence gathering at the Prime Minister's Office Countermeasures Office, which is set up under the Crisis Management Center at the Prime Minister's Office, and would also hold a National Security Council meeting to discuss countermeasures. Japanese Prime Minister Shinzo Abe also instructed relevant ministries to conduct intelligence gathering and analysis in the morning, and stated that the actions of the North Korean authorities are a serious provocation against regional security and stability and have a serious impact on the international community. Japanese Defense Minister Taro Kono pointed out that the distance of the projectile was about 100 to 200 kilometers, and "it is judged to be a ballistic missile," and it did not land in Japan's exclusive economic zone. The South Korean military speculated that the three were super-large multiple rocket launchers and believed that the launch was to improve the accuracy of the weapon system.

An official from the United States told NHK that the US authorities are continuously monitoring the situation regarding North Korea's actions and will consult with its allies Japan and South Korea. Geng Shuang, spokesperson for the Ministry of Foreign Affairs of China, called on all parties concerned to “show flexibility, adhere to dialogue and consultation, and promote the denuclearization of the Korean Peninsula in order to continue the current dialogue and easing of tensions.”

On 10 March, the Korean Central News Agency reported that the purpose of the launch was to check the undue military response and strike capability of the front-line long-range artillery units, and stated that the training was once again guided by Kim Jong Un, the Supreme Commander of the Armed Forces of the DPRK. The report pointed out that the Korean authorities would continue to conduct "low-intensity military training" in the future, but the report did not respond to the statements of the United States and South Korea. The South Korean Ministry of Unification pointed out that the Korean authorities' move was intended to strengthen the defense capabilities and internal unity, attract the attention of South Korea and the United States, and put pressure on South Korea and the United States to change their attitudes. Judging from the statements released by the Korean propaganda media, the Korean authorities were resistant to the South Korean authorities playing the role of arbitrator in the consultations between the two Koreas.

=== 21 March ===
On 21 March, the South Korean Joint Chiefs of Staff said that North Korea launched two short-range ballistic missiles from North Pyongan Province toward the Sea of Japan. The Joint Chiefs of Staff of South Korea said that it was very inappropriate for the North Korean authorities to carry out this action during the pandemic. The South Korean military pointed out that the behavior was irresponsible and demanded that the North Korean government immediately stop the test launch.

=== 29 March ===
On 29 March, the South Korean Joint Chiefs of Staff announced that two objects suspected to be short-range ballistic missiles had been launched from the vicinity of Wonsan, North Korea, toward the eastern waters of the Korean Peninsula in the northeast. In response, Japanese Prime Minister Shinzo Abe demanded that all efforts be made to collect and analyze intelligence, confirm the safety of aircraft and ships, and make full preparations. The Japanese Ministry of Defense stated that the objects appeared to be ballistic missiles, but did not enter Japanese airspace or the exclusive economic zone. The Korean Central News Agency subsequently announced on 30 March that, under the leadership of Ri Pyong-chol, vice chairman of the Workers' Party of Korea, and executed by the Academy of Defence Sciences, a test firing of a super-large multiple rocket launcher had been successfully carried out.

=== 14 April ===
On 14 April, the South Korean Joint Chiefs of Staff said that the North Korean authorities launched several projectiles suspected to be short-range cruise missiles from the Munchon area of Kangwon Province toward the Sea of Japan. This day was not only the eve of the 2020 South Korean legislative election, but also the eve of the Day of the Sun. After the North Korean missile launch, the US military dispatched Lockheed EP-3 reconnaissance aircraft to the Korean Peninsula to carry out electronic reconnaissance missions. In response, the South Korean government stated that it would continue to monitor subsequent developments and that South Korean and US intelligence officials were conducting further analysis on the North Korean test launch.

== Reactions ==
=== Resumption of joint military exercises ===
In response to North Korea's repeated missile launches, the South Korean Minister of National Defense Jeong Kyeong-doo convened a meeting of all military commanders on 10 April and stated that the joint air force combat readiness training and missile defense system integration exercises between the United States and South Korea had been carried out normally. The joint air force exercises between South Korea and the United States, which had been postponed to advance the denuclearization negotiations between North Korea and the United States, were also resumed from 20 to 24 April due to the North Korean issue, thereby sending a warning message to North Korea.

=== Attempts to restart denuclearization negotiations ===
On 12 June, North Korean Foreign Minister Ri Son-gwon issued a statement through the Korean Central News Agency, stating that his hopes for improving relations with the United States had turned into despair, and that North Korea would no longer provide the US administration with leverage for propaganda purposes. On the same day, the South Korean Ministry of Foreign Affairs responded to Ri Son-gwon's statement, saying that the South Korean government would continue to work hard to restart dialogue between North Korea and the United States and develop inter-Korean relations as soon as possible. In response, Ri Son-gwon strongly stated the following day that the South Korean authorities were not qualified to discuss denuclearization-related issues.

The Hankyoreh reported that South Korean President Moon Jae-in intended to push for another summit between Trump and Kim Jong Un. Choe Son-hui, First Vice Foreign Minister of North Korea, responded that the United States only regarded the dialogue between North Korea and the United States as a tool to deal with the political crisis. There was no need to sit down and talk face-to-face. Subsequently, on 7 July, US Deputy Secretary of State Stephen Biegun began his visit to South Korea. The US State Department stated that the trip was to maintain close cooperation with allies and discuss the final and fully verifiable denuclearization of North Korea.

Regarding Bigen's visit to South Korea, North Korea reiterated that it had no intention of restarting dialogue with the United States. Bigen responded by saying that Choi Son-hui was "clinging to outdated ways of thinking." Bigen arrived in Japan on 9 July and held talks with Japanese Foreign Minister Toshimitsu Motegi on the morning of 10 July. In addition to discussing North Korea's nuclear and missile development, they also exchanged views on the Chinese authorities' implementation of the Hong Kong national security law and China's military movements, and confirmed that the United States and Japan would strengthen cooperation on the North Korean and Chinese issues.

In an interview with Voice of America, US President Donald Trump said that he had a good relationship with North Korean leader Kim Jong Un and was open to holding another summit, even though Pyongyang had indicated that it was unwilling to restart denuclearization negotiations with the United States. In response, Kim Yo Jong said that it was unlikely that the summit between the leaders of the two countries would be held within the year, and that such a summit would only benefit the United States, while it would have no practical benefits or advantages for the DPRK.

== See also ==
- 2020 in North Korea
- Korean conflict
