= Second Economic Committee =

North Korea government agency

Second Economic Commission
- 제2경제위원회

Government agency overview
- Formed: 1967
- Jurisdiction: North Korea
- Headquarters: Pyongyang
- Parent department: Cabinet of North Korea

The Second Economic Commission (Korean: 제2경제위원회) is an agency in North Korea tasked with coordinating the country's defense industry.

== Overview ==
Beginning in the 1960s, Kim Il-sung promoted the development of the munitions industry while advocating for the simultaneous pursuit of economic development and national defense construction; the Second Ministry of Machine-Building Industry was established during this process in 1967. As munitions production expanded significantly, the organization evolved into a committee in 1971. Although originally under the Central People's Committee, it was transferred to the jurisdiction of the National Defence Commission in 1993. The Second Economic Committee oversees various enterprises and munitions factories, independently producing the majority of materials and equipment required to bolster military capabilities. In 2026 the Second Economic Committee was placed under the Cabinet of North Korea.

== Structure ==
- 1st General Bureau: Production of small arms and ammunition
- 2nd General Bureau: Production of mechanized equipment
- 3rd General Bureau: Production of military artillery
- 4th General Bureau: Production of missiles and rockets
- 5th General Bureau: Production of chemical weapons
- 6th General Bureau: Production of communication equipment
- 7th General Bureau: Production and acquisition of aircraft
- Academy of Defence Sciences

== See also ==
- Munitions Industry Department of the Workers' Party of Korea
- Civil Defense Department of the Workers' Party of Korea
- Defense industry of North Korea
