= Kim Son-myong =

North Korean politician

Kim Son-myong (Korean: 김선명) is a North Korean politician. She has been serving as Minister of Chemical Industry of North Korea since 2026.

== Career ==
On 20 January 2026, the Korean Central News Agency identified Kim Son-myong as the new Minister of Chemical Industry of North Korea, apparently replacing Kim Chol-ha, who was last recorded as minister in June 2025 and who was also Vice Premier. The change appears to be after the alleged poor management of Chol-ha of an incident in a chemical plant and part of Kim Jong-un’s campaign to tighten discipline amongst economic officials ahead of the 9th Party Congress.
