= Bulsae ATGM =

North Korean anti-tank missile family

Bulsae
- Type: Anti-tank guided missile
- Place of origin: North Korea

The Bulsae ATGM（Korean: 불새, lit. 'Phoenix'）is a family of anti-tank guided missile (ATGM) systems developed by the Democratic People's Republic of Korea, commonly known as North Korea.

== History ==
=== Bulsae-2 ===
North Korea is said to have acquired a number of 9K111 Fagot systems in the late 20th century. These were subsequently reverse-engineered and given the designation Bulsae-2.

=== Bulsae-3 ===
The Bulsae-3 was advertised as the AT-4MLB by North Korean proxy company GLOCOM. In their brochure it was stated that it is controlled by laser beam guidance method.

The Chonma-216 variant of the Pokpung-ho main battle tank (MBT) has been seen fitted with Bulsae-3, which a source alleges to have been derived from the AT-14 Spriggan.

The 2020 Cheonma-2 MBT prototype has the Bulsae-3 as secondary armament. It is said to be reversed engineered Soviet/Russian 9K111 Fagot or 9M133 Kornet missiles.

However, the diameter of the ATGM launchers appears to be 150 mm like the 9M133, rather than 120 mm of the 9K111 and may thus have a higher penetration.

=== Bulsae-4 ===
Eight-tube launcher mounted on a M-2010 6×6 APC chassis.

The system is analogous to Israel's Spike-ER, China's ATF-10 and Serbia's ALAS multi-purpose wire-guided missiles.

=== Bulsae-5 ===
The Songun-915 variant of the Pokpung-ho series of tanks has been seen fitted with Bulsae-5, which a source alleges to have been derived from the 9M133 Kornet.

== Deployment ==
The first international customers of the Bulsae-3 was reported in 2014 to be the Izz ad-Din al-Qassam Brigades and the Al-Nasser Salah al-Deen Brigades.

According to the South Korean National Intelligence Service, the Bulsae-4 was observed during the 2024–25 Kursk offensive, though it is unclear if they are used by Russian or North Korean troops.
