= Academy of Defence Sciences =

- Established: 28 May 1964; 62 years ago
- Formerly called: Second Academy of Natural Sciences; Academy of National Defence Science (former English name)
- Location: Pyongyang, North Korea

The Academy of Defence Sciences (Korean: 국방과학원), formerly called in English as Academy of National Defence Science and also formerly known as Second Academy of Natural Sciences (제2자연과학원), is a North Korean organization involved in the North Korean missile program, including the Hwasong-14.

== Organization ==
The academy is based in Pyongyang. Kim Yong-hwan is the current president, as of May 2025.

It was formerly headed by Colonel General Jang Chang-ha. One former head was Choe Chun-sik (c. 2012).

== History ==
The organization was established in 1964 as the Agency for Defense Development under the Ministry of National Security.

In 1970, it changed to Second Academy of Natural Sciences and moved to the Second Economic Committee.

In the 2000s, it was moved to the Department of Military Industry of the Workers' Party of Korea.

In 2014, it was renamed to the Agency for Defense Development of Cruise Missiles.

Since 2021, it is referred to as the Academy of National Defense Science. In May 2024, Kim Jong Un visited the academy in commemoration of its 60th anniversary.

As of 2025, North Korean state media refers to the academy as Academy of Defence Sciences.

== Activities ==
=== Naval warfare ===
The Academy is also responsible for developing naval vessels and weapons, and has a Maritime Research Institute, headquartered at the Sinpo South Shipyard.

The academy also operates the Nampo Ship Design Institute.

=== Weapons development ===
According to information released by North Korean state media in September 2025, Academy of Defence Sciences has two institutes under its organization for weapons development, called Armoured Defensive Weapons Institute and Electronic Weapons Institute.

== Sanctions ==
In 2010, the academy was slapped with U.S. sanctions.

In 2016, it has been sanctioned by the United States government, and subject to export controls in relations to United Nations Security Council Resolution 2270.

== See also ==
- Academy of Sciences of the Democratic People's Republic of Korea
- Defense industry of North Korea
- Second Economic Committee
- Munitions Industry Department of the Workers' Party of Korea
