= Choe Chun-sik =

North Korean politician

Choe Chun Sik (Korean: 최춘식, born 12 October 1954) was the leader of the North Korean Second Academy of Natural Sciences. He received the title of Hero of the Republic in 2012 for his work on Kwangmyŏngsŏng-3.
