= Defense industry of North Korea =

North Korea's defence industry predates the Korean War, but has emerged as a major supplier to the North Korean armed forces beginning in the 1970s, but increasingly so after the fall of the Soviet Union and to supplement those purchased from China. Most equipment produced are copies of Soviet and Chinese built military hardware. During peacetime it is estimated that munitions factories can produce 2 million artillery shells annually for the 152mm caliber howitzer.

== Military factories ==
Enterprise	Location	Coordinates	Additional information
No. 26 Factory	Kanggye		Kanggye General Tractor Factory
No. 38 Factory	Huichon		Huichon General Machinery Tool Factory
No. 65 Factory	Hakmu, Jonchon	40.6301°N 126.4309°E	Jonchon 2.8 Machinery Factory
Pyorha-ri Armament Factory	Songgan		
No. 301 Factory	Suwon-ri, Taegwan	40.2347°N 125.2459°E	
Kusong Machine Tool Factory	Kusong	40.053°N 125.2018°E	
Sungni Automobile Factory	Tokchon		
January 18 Machine Factory	Kagam-dong, Kaechon		
Kumsong Tractor Factory	Nampho		
Thaesong Machine Factory	Nampho		Nampho Chamjin Munitions Factory
No. 125 Factory	Pyongyang		Pyongyang Pig Farm
No. 7 Factory	Pyongyang		
Pyongyang Weak-Current Apparatus Factory	Pyongyang		
Mangyongdae Weak-Current Apparatus Factory	Pyongyang		Pyongyang Pigeon Farm
Pyongyang Semiconductor Factory	Pyongyang		
Sanum-dong Research Center	Pyongyang		
October 3 Plant	Munchon	39°18′51″N 127°25′15″E	Munchon Naval Base
February 11 Plant	Hamhung	39°55′18″N 127°39′33″E	
Hamhung Chemical Materials Research Center	Hamhung		
Sariwon Weapons Factory	Sariwon		
Sinuiju Measuring Instrument Factory	Sinuiju	40.06928°N 124.43914°E	
No. 81 Factory	Songgan		Songgan Steel Mill
March 16 Factory	Pyongsong		Pyongnam Machine Factory

=== Tanks, arms, and missiles ===
- First Machine Industry Bureau - supplier of machine guns, likely Type 62 Light Machine Gun and Type 73 Light Machine Gun
- Ryu Kyong-su Tank Factory - Sinhung South Hamgyong Province
- Second Machine Industry Bureau - Sŏngch'ŏn-kun, South Pyongan Province - builds Chonma-ho and Pokpung-ho MBT; likely Chuch'e-Po and Koksan artillery gun
- Third Machine Industry Bureau: Multi-stage rockets
- Fourth Machine Industry Bureau: Guided missiles
- Fifth Machine Industry Bureau: Nuclear, biological, and chemical weapons
- Tokhyon Munitions Plant

=== Naval ===
- Bong Dao Bo Shipyards, Sinpo - located on the mainland across from Mayang-do Naval base - builder of the Sang-O and Gorae class Submarines.
- Chongjin Shipyard
- Mayang-do Naval Shipyards, Mayang-do Island in northeast coast - maintenance facility with graving dock; has built some ships for the navy (12 Romeo class submarines)
- Najin Shipyards - Kowan-Class submarine rescue ship, Soho class frigates and Najin class frigates
- Nampho Shipyards - located on west coast and builds small- and medium-size submarines (Sang-O and Yugo?)
- Wonsan Shipyards - located on east coast and builds small- and medium-size submarines (Sang-O and Yugo?)
- Yukdaeso-ri Shipyards - located on west coast and has built midget submarines (Yugo-class submarines or Yono-class submarines) since the 1960s
- Sixth Machine Industry Bureau: Battleships and submarines

=== Aircraft ===
There are no known indigenous aircraft built in North Korea, factories supply components or parts for current aircraft flown such as for Tumansky RD-9 turbojet engine used by Mikoyan-Gurevich MiG-19 and Shenyang J-6. Agreement between China and North Korea was reached in August of 1974 to construct maintenance facility for J-6 fighter jets, completion was not achieved until 1987 due to North Korea requesting for facility to also maintain J-5 and J-7. Capacity of the facility involving J-6 is to service 50 aircraft and 400 of WP-6 engines along manufacture common spare parts, also includes special tools and molds. According to document from the Central Intelligence Agency, facilities at Pangyhyon being built in 1980's were for manufacture of J-7 fighter jet aircraft that is Chinese version of Soviet MiG-21, at repair base were already engine test cells along fabrication building. Serial production of J-7 in North Korea was expected by CIA to start in 1987.

Another is additional sub systems for aircraft such as Tactical air navigation system that for example were known to be exported to Syria.

- Ch’onjin - small factory used to build spare parts and rebuild aircraft for the Air Force.
- Taechon - used to build spare parts and rebuild aircraft for the Air Force.
- Panghyon - North Korea's primary aircraft assembly, repair and research facility established in the mid-1980s.
- Seventh Machine Industry Bureau: Production and purchase of war planes

=== Space ===
- National Aerospace Development Administration

== See also ==
- Munitions Industry Department of the Workers' Party of Korea
- Central Military Commission of the Workers' Party of Korea

== Bibliography ==
- Bermudez Jr., Joseph S. (2001). The Armed Forces of North Korea. I.B. Tauris. ISBN 1-86064-486-4.
