= Juche-po =

North Korean self-propelled artillery gun

- Hangul: 주체포
- Hanja: 主體炮
- RR: Juchepo
- MR: Chuch'ep'o

The Juche-po (M1992) is a North Korean self-propelled artillery gun, based on a modified Ch'ŏnma-ho chassis.

== History ==
The Juche-po is an improvement over the Tŏkch'ŏn artillery piece, which was mounted on an ATS-59 chassis. There are at least four M1991 versions of the Juche-po, each mounting a different gun; the D-30 122mm or the D-74 122 mm and a 152 mm howitzer.

These artillery pieces can be identified by their six road wheels, as compared to the Tŏkch'ŏn's five, and a prominent recoil cylinder which protrudes from the turret. Another major difference is the fact that the Juche-po has a fully encased rounded turret, as opposed to the older open-topped self-propelled artillery pieces used previously. Some are fitted with 9K38 Igla.

Another version is a 30 mm SPAAG SHORAD anti aircraft system.
