= Type 88 assault rifle =

North Korean assault rifle based on the AK-74

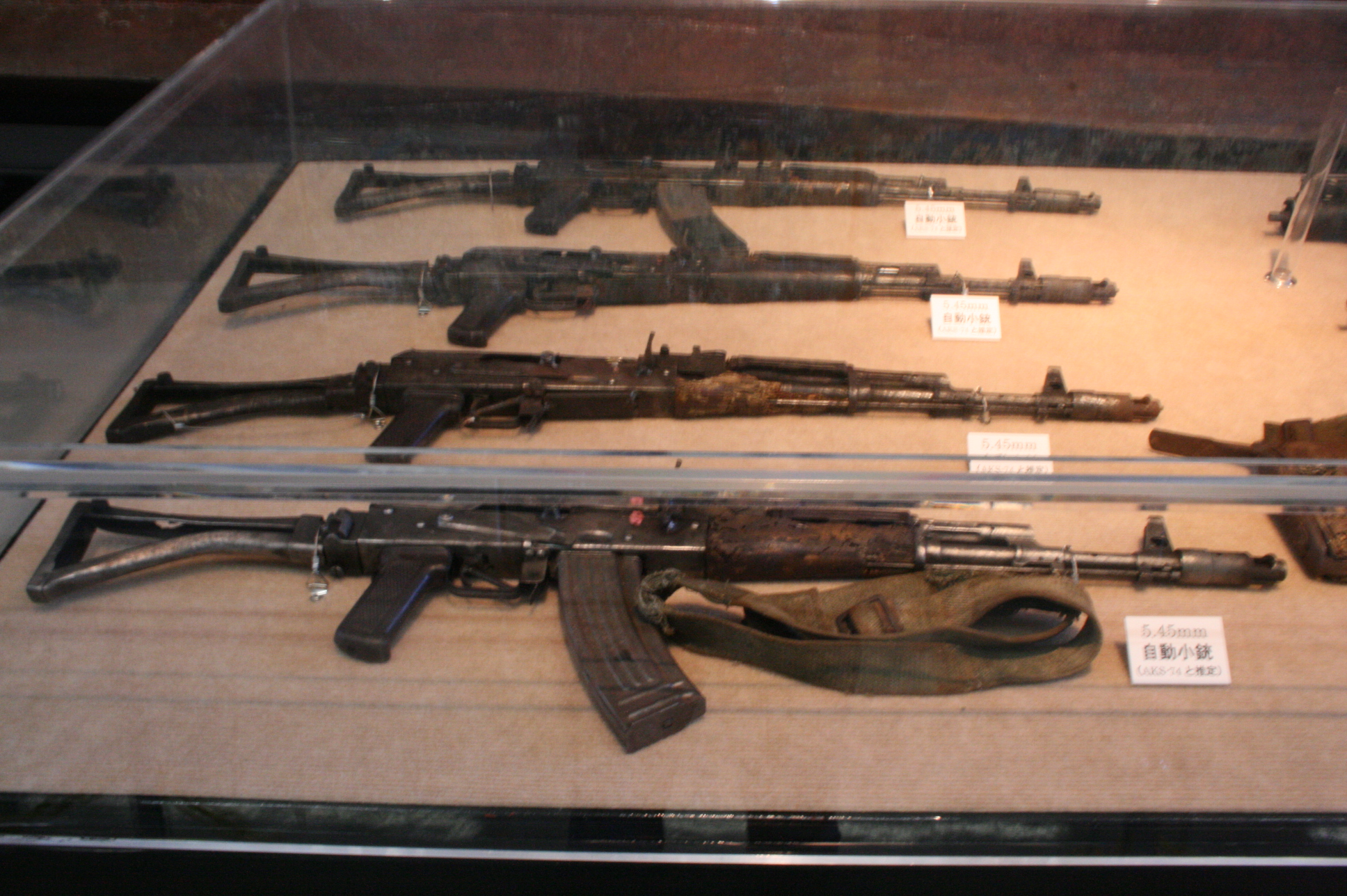
- Type 88-1 assault rifle
- Type: Assault rifle
- Place of origin: North Korea

Production history
- Designer: Mikhail Kalashnikov
- Produced: 1988 (presumed) - present

Specifications
- Cartridge: 5.45×39mm
- Action: Gas-operated, long-stroke piston, closed rotating bolt
- Feed system: 30-round detachable box magazine, helical magazines
- Sights: Adjustable iron sights, front post and rear notch on a scaled tangent

The Type 88 (Korean: 88식자동보총, sometimes misidentified as the Type 98) is an assault rifle made in North Korea derived from the AK-74.

== History ==
The Type 88 commenced production in North Korea in 1988 as the standard issue rifle of the Korean People's Army, with resemblance to the Chinese equivalent.

Several Type 88s were salvaged by the Japan Coast Guard during the aftermath of the Battle of Amami-Ōshima in 2001. The captured rifles have right side-folding stocks, similar to the Chinese Type 81 assault rifle.

In 2010, Type 88s with helical magazines and top folding stocks were observed in operational use with North Korean soldiers accompanying Kim Jong Un.

In 2017, the Type 88 was reportedly being used by North Korean special forces units. They are also seen with the Supreme Guard Command.

== Design ==
The Type 88 is an AK-74 copy with sources suggesting that it was unlicensed and made with technical assistance from China. They are given a black finish to give them a modern look. Newer Type 88s are made with plastic polymer furniture, which led to the mistake of naming them as the Type 98.

The Type 88 uses 30-round steel magazines, but plastic versions are seen with new Type 88s manufactured. Otherwise, the rifles can also use helical magazines. There are reported to hold around 100 to 150 rounds. The Type 88 can be fitted with the GP-25 UBGL.

The Type 88, like its predecessors (Type 58 and 68), has no rate reducer. They are also manufactured with AK-74-based muzzle brakes. It has a combined safety/fire selector switch for safe, semi-auto and full-auto.

== Variants ==
=== Type 88 ===
Clone of the AK-74. Modern versions made to resemble AK-74M.

=== Type 88-1 ===
North Korean AKS-74 copy.

Fitted with right-folding stocks similar to the Type 81 plastic pistol grips, and wooden handguards.

=== Type 88-2 ===
Fitted with top folding stocks and plastic handguard and grips. The stock is reportedly made extremely small, which results in a lack of support and uncomfortable use. The stock, however, does not obstruct the iron sights, charging handle and trigger. Perhaps its most distinct feature is the use of a helical magazine that has reportedly been able to load between 100 and 150 rounds.

This variant was reportedly seen in 2010.

=== Carbine variant ===
Compact variant based on the Type 88 with elements borrowed from the AKS-74U and AK-105 with shortened 20-round magazines. The furniture such as the pistol grip and the lightweight stock are made of plastic.

These were seen in December 2016 when North Korean commandos practiced raid on a mockup area of the Blue House.

=== Bullpup variant ===
Seen after the 2010s. Based on the Type 88-2 and ADS and chambered to fire 5.45 mm rounds, fitted with a scope and a vertical handgrip.

=== Chrome variant ===
Chrome variants are used in the KPA, usually with honor guard soldiers or to exceptional soldiers who have proven themselves.

=== OICW variant ===
OICW-type weapon based on the Type 88-2 chambered to fire the 5.45 mm round, as well as a 20 mm bullpup bolt-action over-barrel launcher with magazine containing around 5 rounds of programmable airburst grenades. It's sometimes known as the NK11.

Around 800 of these rifles were seen in a North Korean military parade in 2018.

== Users ==
- North Korea: Aside from the Korean People's Army, the Type 88 is reportedly being also used by the Worker-Peasant Red Guards, allowing them to replace their older Type 58s/68s.
- Zambia

== Gallery ==
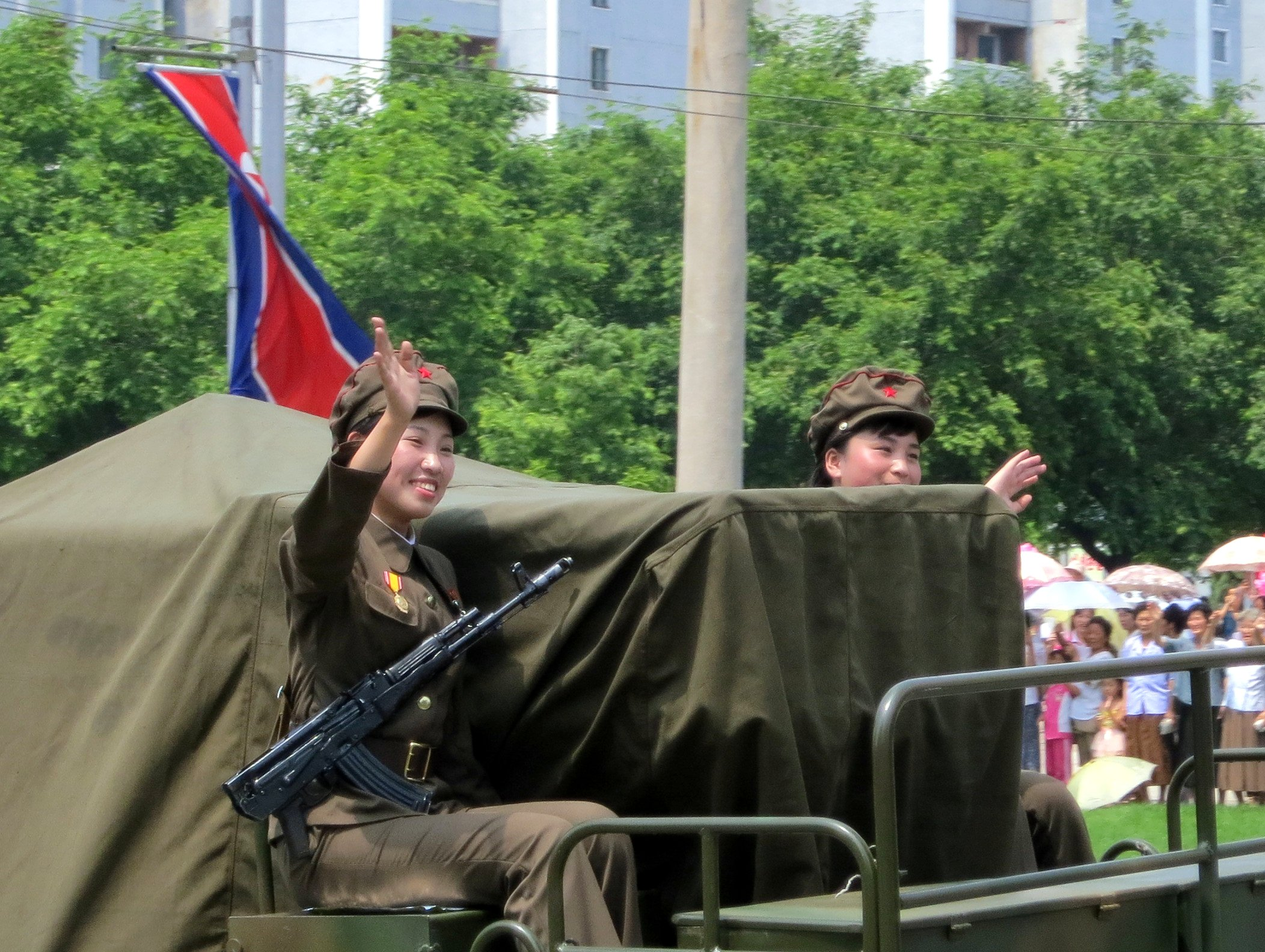
North Korean KPA soldier with a Type 88-2 rifle with its top folding stock.

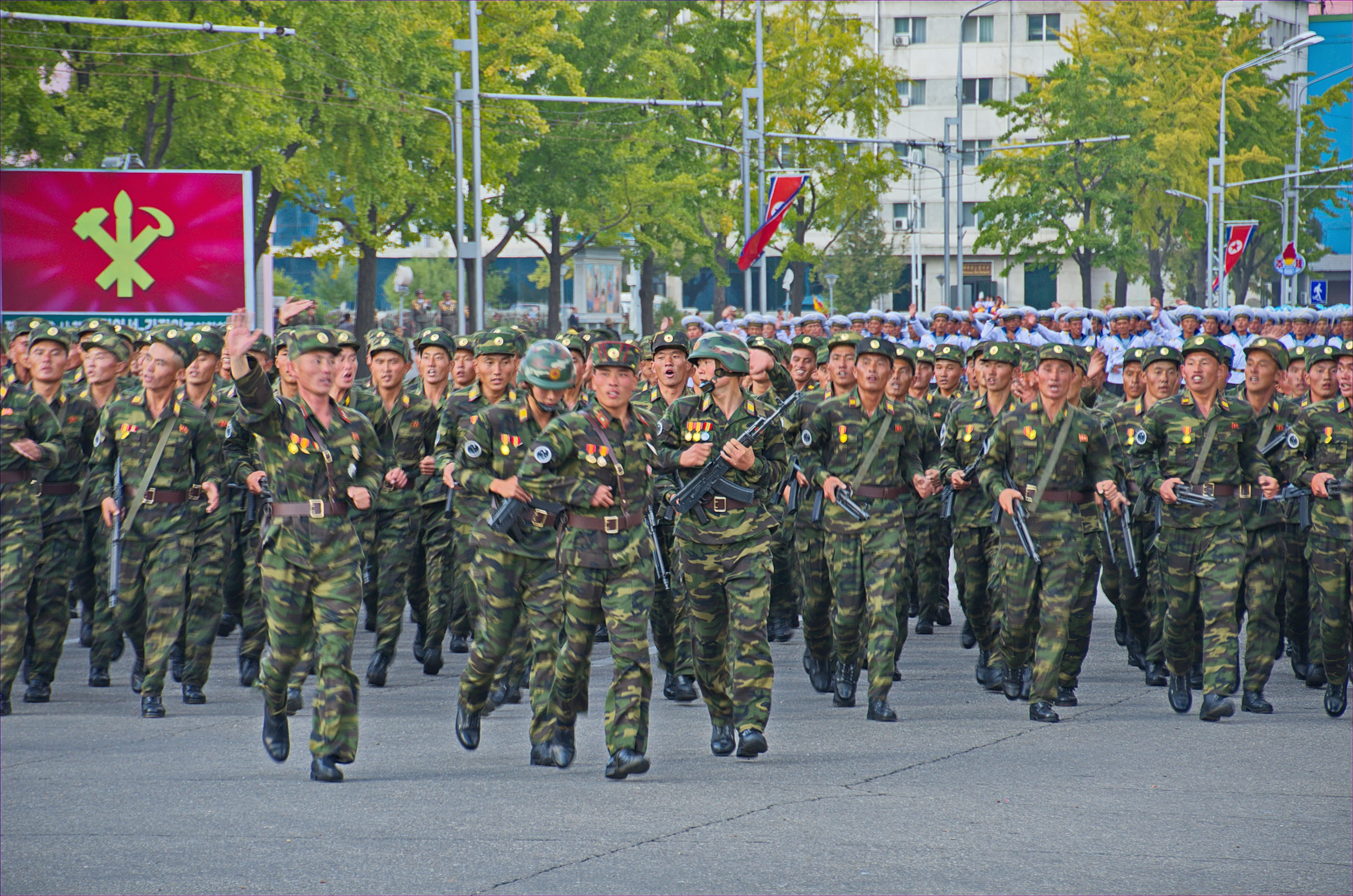
North Korean troops in 2015 marching with Type 88-2 rifles and the Type 88 LMG.

North Korean troops in 2015 marching with Type 88-1 rifles.

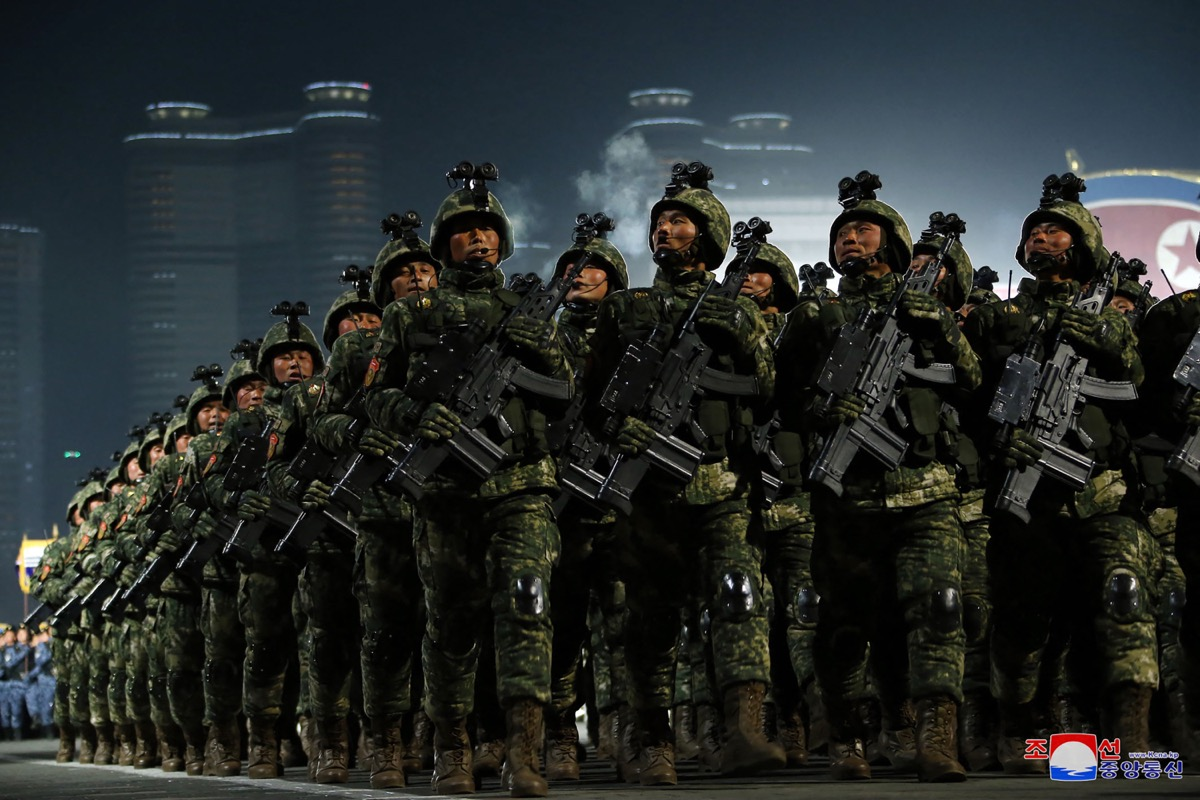
"Type 88-3" rifles in the hands of KPASOF members
