= Munitions Industry Department of the Workers' Party of Korea =

North Korean government organization

- 조선로동당 군수공업부
- Emblem of the Workers' Party of Korea

Agency overview
- Jurisdiction: Party, state and military
- Headquarters: Pyongyang, North Korea
- Agency executive: Director; Kim Kyong-ok
- Parent agency: Central Committee

The Munitions Industry Department of the Workers' Party of Korea (Korean: 조선로동당 군수공업부) is a specialized department within the Secretariat of the Central Committee of the Workers' Party of Korea. It implements the party's military industry policies. It has the Second Economic Committee under its jurisdiction. The department work closely with the Central Military Commission of the Workers' Party of Korea. It plays an important role in North Korea's missile program, overseeing the development of ballistic missiles. In the mid-1970s the Department of Machinery Industry within the WPK was established. In January 1993 it was renamed to the Department of Munitions Industry. In September 2010 renamed to the Department of Machinery Industry apparently to conceal its activity and avoid sanctions. In January 2016 it was renamed again to the Ministry of Munitions Industry.

== See also ==
- Central Military Commission of the Workers' Party of Korea
- Defense industry of North Korea
