= Tokchon (artillery) =

North Korean tracked artillery pieces

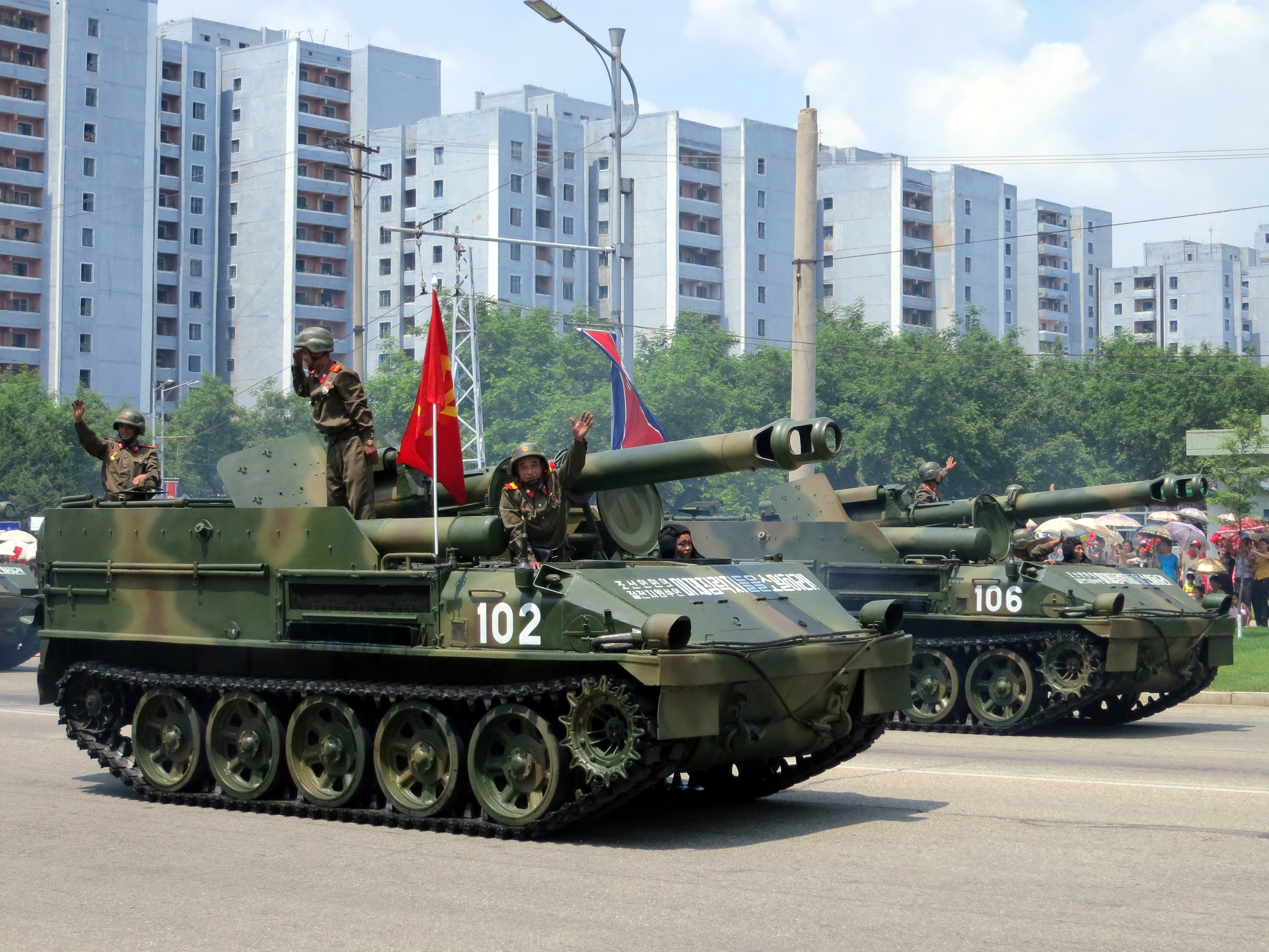
Tŏkch'ŏn M1974 152-mm-SPG

The Tŏkch'ŏn is a series of tracked artillery pieces developed by North Korea in the 1970s and 1980s.

== Design ==
The Tŏkch'ŏn generally makes use of a modified AT-S artillery tractor as a chassis to mount with a variety of existing Soviet towed artillery designs. These designs are intended to support North Korean tank and mechanized forces after breaching the Korean Demilitarized Zone.

Their ballistic characteristics are generally comparable to their towed counterparts. In 1990, George T. Norris of the United States Army Foreign Science and Technology Center gave an assessment stating that the North Korean artillery had an advantage in range and rate of fire over their counterparts in the South, but also noting that these self-propelled mounts offer no protection for their crews other than a small gun shield surrounding the fighting compartment. Janes former editor Christopher F. Foss, states that while the original Soviet AT-S chassis was unarmoured, most of North Korean self-propelled guns are provided with additional armour.

== Versions ==
- M-1992 SPH: 122 mm howitzer 2A18 (D-30) mounted on a modified AT-S chassis. It has a mass of 18 t with maximum range of 15,400 m (16,800 yd).
- M-1985 SPG: 122 mm gun M1931/37 (A-19) mounted on a modified AT-S chassis. It has a mass of 18 t with a maximum range of 20,800 m (22,700 yd).
- M-1981 SPG: D-74 122 mm field gun mounted on a modified AT-S chassis. It has a mass of 19 t with a maximum range of 24,000 m (26,000 yd).
- M-1991 SPG: 122 mm D-74 mounted on a modified AT-S chassis. It has a mass of 22 t with a maximum range of 24,000 m (26,000 yd).
- M-1975 SPG: 130 mm towed field gun M1954 (M-46) mounted on a modified AT-S chassis. It has a mass of 20 t with a maximum range of 27,150 m (29,690 yd).
- M-1991 SPG: 130 mm M-46 mounted on a modified AT-S chassis. It has a mass of 22 t with a maximum range of 27,150 m (29,690 yd).
- M-1992 SPG: 130 mm SM-4-1 coastal defense gun mounted on a modified AT-S chassis. It has a mass of 20 t with a maximum range of 29,500 m (32,300 yd).
- M-1974 SPH: 152 mm gun-howitzer D-20 mounted on a modified VTT-323 chassis. It has a mass of 17 t with a maximum range of 17,410 m (19,040 yd).
- M-1977 SPH: 152 mm howitzer M1943 (D-1) mounted on a Type 63 chassis. It has a mass of 15 t with a maximum range of 12,400 m (13,600 yd).
- M-1991 SPH: 152 mm howitzer-gun M1937 (ML-20) mounted on a modified AT-S chassis. It has a mass of 19 t with a maximum range of 17,265 m (18,881 yd).
- M-1992 37 mm: A self-propelled anti-aircraft gun based on a modified AT-S chassis armed with a twin barrel 37 mm gun based on the Soviet M-1939 (61-K). It has a mass of 19 t, and no onboard radar fire-control system, limiting its use to clear weather operations.
- M-1992 23 mm: SPAAG based on a modified AT-S chassis with a turret similar to the ZSU-23-4, but with two 23 mm guns instead of four. It has a mass of 19 t, and an effective range of 2,500 m (2,700 yd).

== Operators ==
- North Korea
