= Chonma-ho =

Ch'ŏnma
- Ch'ŏnma-92 during the Military parade commemorating the 60th Anniversary of the Korean People's Army in 1992
- Type: Main battle tank
- Place of origin: North Korea

Service history
- Wars: Ethiopian Civil War; Iran-Iraq War

Production history
- Designer: Second Machine Industry Bureau
- Designed: Before 1980
- Produced: 1971
- No. built: More than 1,200

Specifications
- Mass: 37 tonnes (base Ch'ŏnma)
- Length: Hull length: 6.63 m (21.8 ft)
- Width: 3.52 m (11.5 ft)
- Height: 2.4 m (7.9 ft)
- Crew: 4
- Armor: Cast turret, spaced armor, explosive reactive armour
- Main armament: 115 mm U-5TS smoothbore gun
- Secondary armament: KPV 14.5 mm heavy machine gun, 7.62 mm machine gun in coaxial mount
- Engine: Diesel; 580 hp (430 kW) (base Ch'ŏnma) 750 hp (560 kW) (Ch'ŏnma-92 onwards)
- Power/weight: 15.67 hp/ton (base Ch'ŏnma) ~18.75 hp/ton (Ch'ŏnma-92 onwards)
- Suspension: Torsion-bar
- Operational range: 450 km
- Maximum speed: 50 km/h

The Ch'ŏnma (Chosŏn'gŭl: 천마; Hanja: 天馬 meaning 'Pegasus'), Chonma-Ho, is one of North Korea's secretive indigenous main battle tank designs. The tank is also known by the name of 천리마 전차 (千里馬 or the "Chollima Tank"). The Ch'ŏnma is based on the Soviet T-62. There are at least seven different operational versions of the Ch'ŏnma. Since its inception, the Ch'ŏnma has undergone several extensive upgrades. Little public information is available about this tank, and its most recent public appearance was the Ch'ŏnma 20 at the military parade commemorating the 80th Anniversary of the Workers Party of Korea (WPK) held in Pyongyang, North Korea, on 11th October 2025.

== Background ==
After the Armistice Agreement of the Korean War in 1953, North Korea found itself in need of much more modern equipment. Prior to the start of open hostilities, North Korea had acquired 379 T-34s from the Soviet Union. According to a report to the United States Congress in 2000, the North Korean military had up to 2,000 tanks garrisoned along the Korean Demilitarized Zone (DMZ) alone.

Although not much is known about the North Korean military after the Korean War, it is known that they have many different types of tanks. These include the Chinese Type 59 and Type 62, as well as the Soviet T-54/55. The T-54 was probably sold to North Korea between 1960 and 1970, while the T-62 was reportedly sold in the mid-1980s. It is known that the North Koreans still make limited use of vintage World War II T-34s as well as the Soviet-era PT-76 amphibious tanks. Up to 5,400 tanks are coupled with at least 12,000 self-propelled artillery pieces and thousands of other towed artillery pieces of unknown type and quantity.

=== Role ===
The Ch'ŏnma has been issued to North Korea's premier armored formations, and would lead the initial attempts to break through South Korean defences. Other armour is relegated to a secondary role in this corps or to North Korea's four mechanized corps. To underscore North Korea's concept of combined arms and the importance of armour, and therefore the importance of the Ch'ŏnma, North Korea's sole armour corps is directly grouped with two mechanized corps and a single artillery corps. However, this forms the second echelon of North Korea's deployment to the DMZ, with the first echelon composed of four infantry corps, and the rest in strategic reserve. This may also play a part in a defensive strategy, as the North Korean army is arrayed in depth, and the armour might be strategically placed to both provide offensive power and a second echelon composed of mobile defences to plug a South Korean breakthrough along the DMZ.

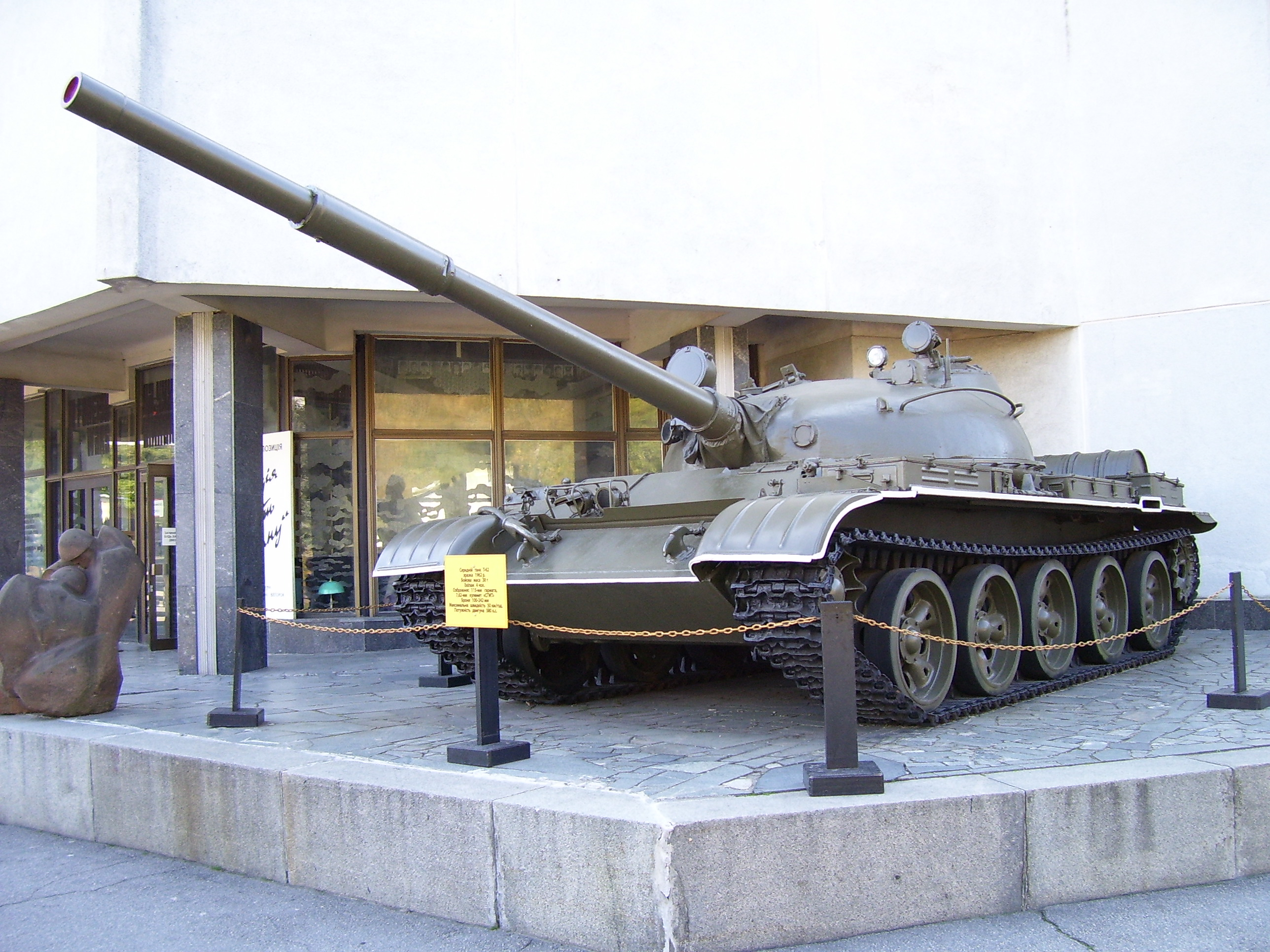
Soviet T-62. The Ch'ŏnma is a direct copy of the T-62 with several upgrades.

The Ch'ŏnma is a product of North Korea's approach of Juche, or self-reliance, which also includes several indigenous self-propelled artillery pieces. The idea of juche comes from a North Korean sentiment of abandonment by their allies, China and Soviet Union/Russia. This accounts for their drive towards overproduction and for recent North Korean nuclear developments, as well as the production of long-range missiles which provide North Korea with its longer range striking power. This all manifests itself within the 'triangle' of North Korean military development – armour, artillery and missiles. In fact, this seems reminiscent from Soviet military theory, including the application of overwhelming artillery support and the use of large amounts of armour to create a breakthrough after the initial artillery disruption. In that sense, North Korean military strategy is very mobile, and the large numbers of tanks underscores this. The Ch'ŏnma is an attempt to partially address the technology gap between its current dated tank forces and South Korean K1A1 and the US M1 Abrams tank.

== Production history ==
The first Ch'ŏnma manufactured were simply license-produced T-62s with some minor differences, such as a differently shaped loader's hatch on the turret, and distinctive bolts on the front glacis. It is commonly stated that North Korea received batches of 500 T-62s from the Soviet Union, but this is incorrect. It is much more probable that the Soviet Union provided North Korea with the required knowledge to domestically produce the T-62, possibly donating a production line in the process, with series production starting in 1978. It is also often inaccurately claimed that the initial Ch'ŏnma had worse armour quality than the T-62, but this is also unfounded – no nation that operated the Ch'ŏnma complained about the armour quality, and studying of the American-captured Ch'ŏnma in Iraq in 2003 didn't reveal any armour defects either.

The Ch'ŏnma underwent a few minor upgrades in its initial form. In 1986, the Ch'ŏnma was first seen with a new turret bustle. This would increase the turret's interior space, perhaps providing more ammunition capacity by enabling the radio and other equipment to be stored elsewhere. In 1992 (albeit initially spotted in 1985), the Ch'ŏnma was shown in a parade with external laser rangefinders over the base of the gun barrel. Multiple variants of the laser rangefinder have been seen, and they are all distinct from the Soviet KTD-1 and KTD-2. These variants were not distinguished in North Korean service by different names, and are thus all called Ch'ŏnma. However, western sources often refer to the variant with the laser rangefinder as Ch'ŏnma-Ho II.

The first major upgrade of the Ch'ŏnma is known as the Ch'ŏnma-92 in North Korea (referred to as either M1992 or Ch'ŏnma-Ho III/Da in Western sources). It was first spotted in 1992 but officially presented on 25 April 2002, for the 60th anniversary of the founding of the Korean People's Army. The upgrade consisted of a new welded turret (with composite armour) with ERA on the sides (in 3 rows of 3-4-4 elements), a thermal sleeve for the gun, a new laser rangefinder (still externally mounted) and smoke grenade launchers on the front turret, as well as a new 750 hp engine. The vehicle was also upgraded with rubber side skirts, and some with stowage bins on the turret rear. Another minor variant of this has also been spotted, and seems to remove the turret side ERA in place of spaced armour.

Ch'ŏnma-98, first seen in 2000 and known to western analysts as Chonma-Ho IV/Ra, was an evolution of the Ch'ŏnma-92, replacing the turret with a slightly larger one (of the same shape), thus implying a revised composite array layout. The placement of smoke grenade launchers was altered. It has been theorised that this variant received a new thermal gunner sight and fire-control system, possibly imported from Iran (such as those used on their Chieftains), but this is unconfirmed and purely speculation. It was only produced in limited numbers. An example of the Ch'ŏnma-98 is located in the Korean People's Army Museum in Pyongyang.

Ch'ŏnma-214, first seen in 2001 and known to western analysts as Chonma-Ho V/Ra, was effectively the serial production version of the Ch'ŏnma-98. The vehicle shared the same upgrades as the Ch'ŏnma-98, and added add-on armour on the front turret, as well as rubber flaps on the lower front hull (similar to those on the Soviet T-80U). This add-on armour appears to be similar to the Soviet 'BDD' armour present on their upgraded T-55Ms and T-62Ms.

North Korea is rumored to have received a few examples of the T-72s after 1992, and possibly a single T-90S main battle tank in August 2001. However, any conclusion regarding whether the Ch'ŏnma has been upgraded to the standards of either the T-72 or the T-90S is highly speculative.

Around 90% of the Ch'ŏnma-ho is indigenously produced. There is evidence, however, that North Korea has purchased entire engines, or engine components, from Slovakia. Furthermore, it is thought that ceramic components, possibly for an upgraded armour scheme, are from foreign sources, as well as fire control components, such as from Iran. It is not clear how much is indigenously produced in regards to the different variants of the Ch'ŏnma. The figure of 90% could have changed considerably between the original Ch'ŏnma and the Ch'ŏnma-214 although it should be kept into consideration that many of the major features are probably purchased from abroad – especially for the upgrades of the tanks. It is not clear how much North Korea can afford to produce on its own, or how much it can afford to import for that matter. It is thought that North Korea is considerably low on resources, especially money, and this belief has been perpetuated after North Korea's nuclear test incidents in 2006. It is possible that Russia is supplying North Korea with several components for North Korea's tank projects which include the Ch'ŏnma and quite possibly the Pokpung, although no hard evidence can support this claim.

In August 2010 North Korean media revealed images of its new main battle tank the P'okp'ung (also known as the M-2002), which had been rumoured to have been under development since the early 1990s and to have undergone performance trials in 2002. While precise details of its capabilities remain unclear, the P'okp'ung appears to be simply a further improvement of the Ch'ŏnma.

== Deployment history ==
It is unknown which units of the Korean People's Army might be outfitted with the Ch'ŏnma. It is clear that the Ch'ŏnma is a general replacement for previously employed tanks, including the T-34, T-62 and Type 59 medium tanks. It is very possible that the Ch'ŏnma will equip the spearhead and elite of North Korea's armoured forces. They are apparently deployed in sufficient numbers to be strategically significant. There might be as many as 800 T-62s in addition to the over 1000 Ch'ŏnma's in the North Korean army, of which any number could be one of the five Ch'ŏnma variants.

Ethiopia purchased and used Ch'ŏnma tanks against rebels during the Ethiopian Civil War. Some Ch'ŏnma tanks were found abandoned when rebels overran the capital Addis Ababa.

== Models ==
- Ch'ŏnma (also known as Ch'ŏnma-Ho I) – License-produced T-62, with minor modifications.
  - Ch'ŏnma (1986) – Ch'ŏnma with a rear turret bustle
  - Ch'ŏnma (1992) (also known as Ch'ŏnma-Ho II) – Ch'ŏnma with an external laser rangefinder above the main gun
- Ch'ŏnma-92 (also known as Ch'ŏnma-Ho III) – New welded turret with ERA, a thermal sleeve for the gun, a new laser rangefinder, smoke grenade launchers on the front turret, and a new engine, as well as rubber side skirts. Another minor variant of this has also been spotted, and seems to remove the turret side ERA in place of spaced armour.
- Ch'ŏnma-98 (also known as Ch'ŏnma-Ho IV) – Slightly larger turret of the same shape as the Ch'ŏnma-92, with improved armour, and potentially a new FCS.
- Ch'ŏnma-214 (also known as Ch'ŏnma-Ho V) – Adds appliqué turret armour and rubber flaps on the front hull.

=== Variants ===
- Ch'ŏnma ARV – Armoured recovery vehicle with a casemate superstructure.
- Ch'ŏnma Bridgelayer – Ch'ŏnma with turret replaced by bridge-launching equipment.
- Juche-po – Self-propelled artillery gun on a modified Ch'ŏnma chassis. The Juche-po is an improvement over the Tŏkch'ŏn artillery piece, which was mounted on an ATS-59 chassis. There are at least four M1991 versions of the Juche-po, each mounting a different gun: the D-30 122 mm, D-74 122 mm, the M-46 130 mm and the SM-4-1 130 mm howitzer. These artillery pieces can be identified by their six road wheels, as compared to the Tok-Ch'ŏn's five, and a prominent recoil cylinder which protrudes from the turret. Another major difference is that the Juche-Po has a fully encased rounded turret, as opposed to the older open-topped self-propelled artillery pieces used previously.

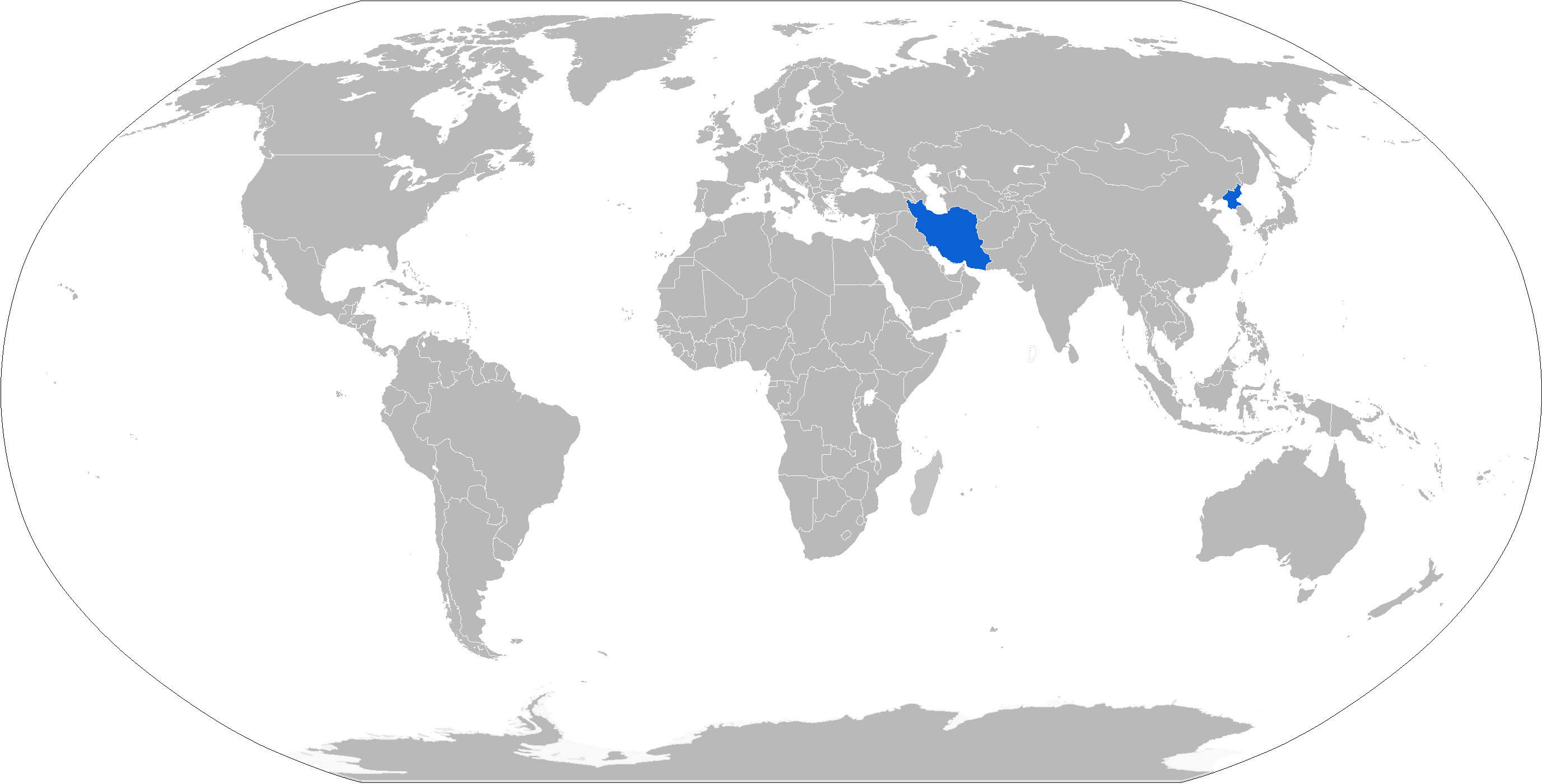
Map of Ch'ŏnma operators in blue

== Operators ==
=== Current ===
- Eritrea: Used by the Eritrean Defence Force.
- Iran: 150 ordered in 1981 from North Korea and delivered between 1982 and 1985.
- North Korea: 470 were produced between 1980 and 1989 (the original order was placed in 1976). Overall more than 1,200 were produced.

=== Former ===
- Ethiopia: Unknown number of Ch'ŏnma's bought in the early 1980s, most shown in a 1987 military parade. Out of service by around 2000.

== See also ==
- Pokpung-ho
