= Pokpung-ho =

Chonma-215, -216
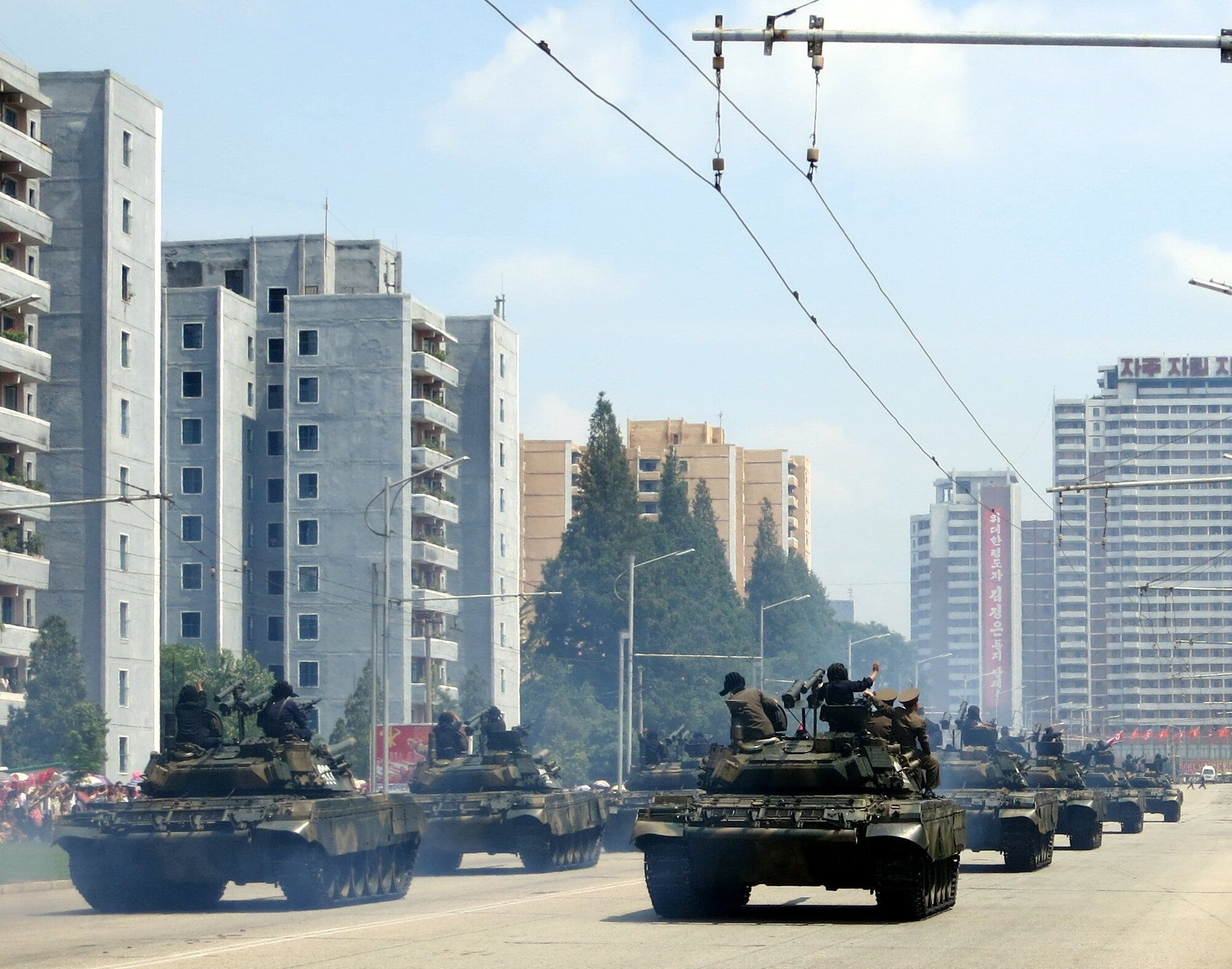
- Chonma-216 tanks in Pyongyang at a military parade, 2013
- Type: Main battle tank
- Place of origin: North Korea

Service history
- In service: 2002–present
- Used by: Korean People's Army Ground Force

Production history
- Designer: Second Machine Industry Bureau
- Manufacturer: Ryu Kyong-su Tank Factory

Specifications
- Mass: 44.3 tonnes (48.8 US Short Tons, 97,665 lb)
- Length: Hull length: ~7 m
- Width: ~3.5 m
- Height: ~2.2 m
- Crew: 4
- Armor: Composite Armour. ERA plates optional. Maximum estimated armor thickness without ERA – 500 mm vs HEAT
- Main armament: 115 mm 2A20 (Chonma-215)
- Secondary armament: 14.5mm KPVT heavy anti-aircraft machine gun (300 rounds), 7.62 mm PKT (Chonma-215/216) Dual AGS-30 automatic grenade launcher, Dual Bulsae-4M, Dual Igla MANPADS, 7.62 mm PKT (Chonma mod.2017)
- Engine: 12 cylinder diesel engine delivering 1,000 (±150) hp
- Suspension: Torsion-bar
- Operational range: ~370-500km
- Maximum speed: 60 km/h

- Pokpung-ho
- Hangul: 폭풍호
- Hanja: 暴風號
- RR: Pokpungho
- MR: P'okp'ungho

The P'okp'ung-ho (Korean: 폭풍호), officially the Chonma-215 and Chonma-216 are North Korean main battle tanks (MBT) developed in the 1990s. The tank may incorporate technology found in the T-62, T-72, and Ch'onma-ho MBTs. Outside parties codename the tank M-2002 because the tank went through performance trials on February 16, 2002 (therefore being officially confirmed by outside sources), although the tank may have been in existence since 1992.

The P'okp'ung-ho is only known to be used in North Korea.

== Origin ==
After the dissolution of the Soviet Union, a significant number of T-72s were decommissioned from Soviet service and scrapped for metal. North Korea is believed to have acquired some of these scrapped T-72s and obtained core technology for use on the P'okp'ung-ho through reverse engineering. It is also believed North Korea acquired three samples of T-80 in early 1990s from Afghanistan. North Korea's interest in the T-90 was demonstrated in August 2001 when Kim Jong-il visited the Omsktransmash defense plant which builds the T-90 during his visit to Russia. However, North Korea failed to acquire T-90 since then, as South Korean and Russian governments agreed to cease supplying arms technology to North Korea since 1994.

The destruction of Iraqi T-72s by western tanks such as the M1 Abrams during the Gulf War demonstrated the poor combat performance of the older export variants of T-72s against top-of-the-line Western models. North Korea decided to significantly modernize its tank fleet to bridge the performance gap between its Ch'onma-ho MBTs and the South Korean K1 MBTs, which has similar performance to the early models of the American M1 Abrams. However, economic struggles and a lack of several core technologies seem to have prevented North Korea from achieving high production numbers for the P'okp'ung-ho before the late 2000s.

== Production history ==
The first P'okp'ung-ho is believed to have been produced in 1992 in the Ryu Kyong-su Tank Factory, located in Sinhung, South Hamgyong province under the Second Economic Committee and Second Academy of Defense Science. The capabilities of later variants have been augmented significantly. Because of North Korea's limited industrial capability, compounded by the fact that North Korea has also spent most of the resources allotted for the development of the P'okp'ung-ho on its nuclear program, North Korea was believed to possess fewer than 250 of these tanks in 2007. However, production seems to have picked up starting in 2010. The tank was witnessed by parties outside of North Korea in 2002 and thus codenamed the M-2002. The P'okp'ung-ho was shown to the public during a North Korean parade in 2010, as well as during military exercises in 2012.

== Design characteristics ==
Unclassified images of the P'okp'ung-ho finally surfaced in 2010, which showed the tank design appeared to be developed from the later models of the Ch'onma-ho and influenced by the T-72. The P'ok'pung-ho has better mobility, survivability and firepower than the Ch'onma-ho. Capabilities of the tank have been speculated to be nearly identical to T-90, however the limited access to technical information regarding the P'okp'ung-ho makes accurate comparisons difficult.

=== Armament ===
The P'okp'ung-ho's primary armament was almost certainly the 2A20 115 mm gun in early examples; however, later versions seemed to be armed with the 2A26/2A46 125 mm smoothbore gun. which fires AP rounds produced in North Korea. The tank also has a heavy KPV anti-aircraft machine gun and a coaxial machine gun, as well as four smoke grenade launchers on the each side of the turret. The tank cannot fire ATGMs from its main gun. A model displayed at an April 2017 parade was equipped with two MANPADS launchers at the rear of the turret, two ATGM launchers mounted on the left side of the turret, and twin automatic grenade launchers mounted on the right side of commander hatch.

=== Hull and armor ===
Although the engine compartment and the layout show some resemblance to a T-72 hull, the chassis is basically a longer heavily modified version of T-62. The glacis plate of the Pokpung-ho is heavily sloped and protected by appliqué armor in the initial version with ERA added in later versions. The turret is reinforced with wedge-shaped armor modules in Pokpung-Ho I and seems to be protected by composite armour similar to the later export variant T-72M1 in Pokpung-Ho II with ERA added in Pokpung-Ho III. The panels along the tracks seem to be made of a light laminar armour.

=== Engine ===
The P'okpoong engine is likely to have around 750–1,000 horsepower.

=== Internal systems ===
The fire control system of the P'okp'ung-ho is relatively modern and based on the presence of a meteorological mast is almost certainly computerized, and some reports claim that it may be based on the Chieftain FCS, which Iran may have illegally exchanged for North Korean technology. If the P'okp'ung-ho's FCS is based on the T-72's, it may implement the PNK-3 or PNK-4 day and night sighting system with the 1K13-49 periscope combined passive/active sight guidance system. However the night sighting system is most likely to be the same with obsolete T-62. The quality of the equipment are likely inferior to the South Korean counterparts, but there is no proof for this claim.

The P'okp'ung-ho also has an infrared sensor (TPN-3-49 or TPN-4), a laser rangefinder and a search light, all of which allow the P'okp'ung-ho to operate during the night.

== Models ==
=== Chonma-215 ===
The first actual 'Pokpung-Ho', it mounts a 115 mm 2A20 smoothbore gun and has a new turret seemingly augmented with composite armour. ERA was also fitted on the front glacis. First observed publicly during the October 10, 2010 military parade. SA-7 MANPADS can also be fitted.

=== Chonma-216 ===
Currently the most advanced variant of the 'Pokpung-Ho', it uses the 2A26 125 mm smoothbore cannon; this version possesses most of the traits of the Chonma-215 but has additional reactive armour on the turret front and forward part of the turret roof and is also seen fitted with Bulsae-3 and SA-16.

=== Songun-915 ===
A newer derivation of the 'Pokpung-ho' series of tanks. It instead has a modified chassis and a massive cast turret fitted with composite armor. It has also been seen fitted with Bulsae-5 and SA-16.

== Operators ==
- North Korea - Estimates range from 200 as of 2010 in the 105th Seoul Ry-Kyong-Su Guards Armored Division to 500 as of 2013. In 2020, estimated production since 2002 is 600 units.

== See also ==
- Ch'onma-ho – (North Korea)
- Type 96 – (China)
- T-72 – (Soviet Union)
- T-90 – (Soviet Union, Russia)

== Bibliography ==
- Bermudez Jr., Joseph S. (2001-03-14). The Armed Forces of North Korea. I.B. Tauris. ISBN 1-86064-486-4.
- Bermudez Jr., Joseph S. (2010). "P'okpoong (Storm) Main Battle Tank" (PDF). KPA Journal. 1 (4): 6–11. OCLC 741222847. Archived (PDF) from the original on 2010-12-14.
- Foss, Christopher F, ed. (2011). Jane's Armour and Artillery 2011–2012 (32nd ed.). Surrey: Janes Information Group. ISBN 978-0-71062-960-9.
