= Hwasong-11E =

North Korean hypersonic missile

- Type: Short-range or medium-range ballistic missile
- Place of origin: North Korea

Service history
- In service: 2026–present
- Used by: Korean People's Army Strategic Force; DPRK Missile Administration

Production history
- Designed: 2025
- Manufacturer: North Korea
- Developed from: Hwasong-11A, Hwasong-11C
- Developed into: Hwasong-11E-1

Specifications
- Mass: 3,400 kg (7,500 lb)
- Length: 7.3–9.8 m (24–32 ft)
- Diameter: 0.9 m (2 ft 11 in)
- Warhead: Hypersonic glide vehicle
- Engine: Solid-fueled engine
- Operational range: Estimated: 800–1,500 km (500–930 mi)
- Maximum speed: Estimated: Mach 5 – Mach 8 (6,100–9,800 km/h; 3,800–6,100 mph) (terminal phase); Tested: Mach 8 (9,800 km/h; 6,100 mph)
- Launch platform: 5-axle TEL

The Hwasong-11E (Note: Also known as Hwasong-11Ma and Hwasongpho-11Ma, with the letter "Ma" being the fifth letter in the Korean alphabet.) (Korean: 화성-11마; lit. 'Mars Type 11E') is a North Korean short-range or medium-range ballistic missile. First revealed on 4 October 2025 during a military exhibition, the Hwasong-11E is a member of Hwasong-11 family of short-range ballistic missile (SRBM), with the missile being designed to be equipped with hypersonic glide vehicle. The first confirmed launch was on 4 January 2026, although there was an alleged flight test on 22 October 2025. In September 2026, North Korea unveiled a new variant of Hwasong-11E, called Hwasong-11E-1 during a test.

== Description ==
Images of the Hwasong-11E
- The missile's hypersonic glide vehicle
- Comparison with Hwasong-11C

The Hwasong-11E is the sixth member of the Hwasong-11 missile family. It uses the same booster and engine as Hwasong-11C, the larger variant of Hwasong-11A. The TEL of Hwasong-11E is a 5-axle chassis that can carry two missiles, like other road-mobile variants of Hwasong-11A. Open-source assessments indicate the Hwasong-11E's length and diameter are estimated to be 7.3–9.8 m (24–32 ft) and 0.9 m (2 ft 11 in) respectively, while its launch mass is also judged to be 3,400 kg (7,500 lb).

The missile features a hypersonic glide vehicle, using the design not seen in other systems, with four fins (two aerodynamic and two guidance) located near its base. It has the capability of conducting unexpected and complicated maneuvers, including S-turn and rapid altitude changes. Estimation indicates a range of 800–1,500 km (500–930 mi), which is longer than other Hwasong-11 variants due to the lengthened flight trajectory and duration.

The Hwasong-11E may bring North Korea additional hypersonic-speed strike capability for use against South Korea's better-protected targets, including airfields, command centers and weapons storage facilities. According to South Korean media, as the Hwasong-11E can reach hypersonic speed and fly at low altitude, it's capable of evading the air defense systems of the United States and South Korea. The missile's estimated maximum speed at terminal phase is Mach 5 – Mach 8 (6,100–9,800 km/h; 3,800–6,100 mph). According to North Korea, Hwasong-11E can execute "ultraprecision" strikes against targets located at hundreds of kilometers away with high destructive power and defense evading capability.

It is possible that North Korea develops Hwasong-11E based on Hwasong-11A's combat performance in Russo-Ukrainian war.

According to North Korean official Pak Jong-chon, Hwasong-11E is a new weapon system that have a "new strategic value", reflecting the development of North Korean defense industry. Given North Korea's tactical missile production capacity is one of the largest in the world, the research and development cycle of the Hwasong-11E can be shortened and the missile may enter mass production.

== History ==
North Korea unveiled Hwasong-11E at the "Defence Development-2025" opened on 4 October 2025, with the missile's official name written at the warhead. It was showcased along with other weapons, including Hwasong-18, Hwasong-19 (later confirmed as Hwasong-20), supersonic cruise missiles and anti-submarine missiles. Later, North Korea displayed the missile on 10 October 2025, during a military parade.

An alleged test-fire occurred on 22 October 2025. Later, a confirmed test-fire of Hwasong-11E occurred on 4 January 2026. The launch related to "the recent geopolitical crisis and complicated international events" according to North Korean state media, suggesting the possible reaction to the US military intervention in Venezuela that resulted in the capture of Nicolás Maduro.

== List of tests ==
Attempt	Date (Pyongyang Standard Time)	Location	Outcome	Additional notes	References
Unconfirmed	22 October 2025, 8:10 a.m.	Ryokpho District, Pyongyang	Success	South Korean military detected multiple ballistic missiles were launched at 8:10 a.m. and flew about 350 km (220 mi). North Korean state media confirmed the launch of two missiles, which was organized by the Missile Administration. The missiles were called "important" weapon system and "hypersonic projectiles" without mentioning official designation. The launch may involved Hwasong-11E, but it is also possible that the missiles were Hwasong-11C-4.5. The missiles flew in a northeast direction and hit their preset target in Orang County, North Hamgyong Province, 430 km (270 mi) away from launch point.	
1	4 January 2026, 7:50 a.m.	Ryokpho District, Pyongyang	Success	The missiles were officially reported to fly 1,000 km (620 mi). The Korean Central News Agency provided neither detailed information nor any close-up images of the missiles. However, it is highly likely the missiles were Hwasong-11E based on North Korean description of "hypersonic missiles", although initial assessment from South Korean military suspected the launch might involve Hwasong-11A. The launch occurred at 7:50 a.m local time, with Japan reporting a maximum range of 950 km (590 mi) and an apogee of 50 km (31 mi). The missiles likely made a pull-up maneuver and achieved a maximum speed of Mach 8 (9,800 km/h; 6,100 mph), based on information from a screen shown by North Korean state media. Kim Jong Un oversaw the launch.	

== Hwasong-11E-1 ==
Hwasong-11E-1
- Type: Short-range ballistic missile
- Place of origin: North Korea

Service history
- Used by: DPRK Missile Administration

Production history
- Designed: 2026

Specifications
- Mass: 9,800 kg (21,600 lb)
- Length: 9.6 m (31 ft)
- Diameter: 1.1 m (3 ft 7 in)
- Warhead: Hypersonic glide vehicle
- Engine: Solid-fuel engine
- Operational range: Tested: 450–1,000 km (280–620 mi)
- Maximum speed: Tested: Over Mach 6 (7,400 km/h; 4,600 mph)
- Launch platform: 6-axle TEL

In September 2026, North Korea unveiled a new variant of Hwasong-11E, called Hwasong-11E-1 (Note: Also known as Hwasong-11Ma-1 and Hwasongpho-11Ma-1.) (《화성포-11마-1》형; lit. 'Mars Artillery Type 11E-1'). It appears to be an advanced version of the original missile.

=== Description ===
Images of the Hwasong-11E-1
- Launch of the missile
- Monitor screen showing missile name

Images from North Korean state media indicate Hwasong-11E-1 has a red-white livery. The TEL is a 6-axle chassis, with two launch canisters and modified retractable hatches to cover the warhead. It is equipped with what appears to be hypersonic glide vehicle (HGV). The "-1" designation suggests it is the upgraded version of Hwasong-11E. According to Janes Information Services, the missile is roughly 9.6 m (31 ft) long, 1.1 m (3 ft 7 in) wide and has a mass of 9,800 kg (21,600 lb).

The use of boost-glide design, which is the combination of speed and flight path, allows Hwasong-11E-1 maneuvering in flight, making the trajectory prediction more difficult. If the HGV itself enters mass production and deployment, it may cause missile defense problems for South Korean and the US forces.

Estimates quoted by France's Agence France-Presse and South Korea's The Dong-A Ilbo indicate a tested range of from 450–600 km (280–370 mi) to a higher end of 1,000 km (620 mi) in the maiden test flight. If the North Korea's claim of 908.2 km (564.3 mi)-range is verified, Hwasong-11E-1 can cover a large portion of the Korean Peninsula.

According to Kim Jong Un, Hwasong-11E-1, placed within the broader context of North Korean weapon developments, "would give the enemy an incurable headache".

=== History ===
Hwasong-11E-1 was first tested on 20 September 2026. Although no name was directly mentioned by North Korean state media, the missile's official designation was confirmed as one of the images released by them showed a label on the monitor screen that contains the formal name.

=== List of tests ===
Attempt	Date (Pyongyang Standard Time)	Location	Outcome	Additional notes	References
1	20 September 2026	Anbyon County, Kangwon Province	Success	South Korean and Japanese militaries detected the launch of two ballistic missiles at about 3:00 p.m. and 5:50 p.m. local time. According to Japan, they flew 440–590 km (270–370 mi) to apogees of 60–70 km (37–43 mi), while South Korean claims indicated ranges of 450 km (280 mi) and over 600 km (370 mi). Two days after the launch, North Korean state media confirmed the test, saying it was carried out by the DPRK Missile Administration under Kim Jong Un supervision. Images indicated the presence of his daughter, as well as a monitor screen displaying a pull-up maneuver, an achieved speed of over Mach 6 (7,400 km/h; 4,600 mph) and the 908.2 km (564.3 mi)-range reached by the missile while remaining in flight. The possible scenarios of this distance claim include altered data, different flight path measurement, and South Korea and Japan's unacknowledgement of a portion of the flight path. North Korea did not clarify the tested weapon; instead, they using generic terms such as "new-type weapon" and "new, important combat weapon system".	

== See also ==
Related development

- Hwasong-8
- Hwasong-11A
- Hwasong-12B
- Hwasong-16B

Comparable missiles

- DF-17
