= Hwasong-12A =

Hwasong-12A (presumed)
- Type: Medium-range or intermediate-range ballistic missile

Service history
- In service: 2022–present
- Used by: Korean People's Army Strategic Force

Production history
- Designed: 2021

Specifications
- Length: About 14.5 m (48 ft)
- Warhead: Maneuverable reentry vehicle (MaRV)
- Engine: Liquid-propelled engine
- Operational range: Over 2,000 km (1,200 mi)
- Maximum speed: Mach 10 (12,300 km/h)
- Launch platform: 6-axle TEL

The Hwasong-12A (Korean: 《화성-12가》형; lit. 'Mars Type 12A') is presumed to be the official designation of a North Korean single-stage, liquid-fueled, hypersonic ballistic missile. Unofficially known in South Korea as Hypersonic Missile Type 2 (극초음속 미사일 2형), Hwasong-12A was revealed in October 2021, during a military exhibition. First test-fire of the missile occurred on 5 January 2022.

== Description ==
Images of the Hwasong-12A
- Launch of the missile
- At the 25 April 2022 military parade

The missile is believed to be a Hwasong-12-based medium-range or intermediate-range ballistic missile, with an estimated length of about 14.5 m (48 ft). However, after the missile's public debut, South Korean researchers initially assessed the missile to be an anti-aircraft missile with maneuverable reentry vehicle (MaRV) payload. Its assumed range is over 2,000 km (1,200 mi).

The shape of the reentry vehicle (RV) is totally different from Hwasong-8, this having a conical shaped RV. It suggests that North Korea is trying to develop two different types of hypersonic missiles. The MaRV is mounted on a shortened Hwasong-12 booster. From this point of view, American researcher Jeffrey Lewis assessed that conical shape of this missile's warhead seems to be a maneuvering reentry vehicle that has high maneuverability. Also he claimed that framing this missile into 'hypersonic' may mislead to focus speed of this missile. Technically speaking, the missile can be classed as hypersonic, as it exceeds Mach 5 in speed, stays within the atmosphere during the entire flight, and is able to conduct at least one maneuver that deviates from the initial flight direction. However, the shape and relatively modest turning maneuvers demonstrated are more consistent with an MaRV than a boost-glide vehicle (BGV) like the Hwasong-8's RV; although comparatively less maneuverable, an MaRV is a simpler design.

Similar to Hwasong-8, North Korean state media also claimed Hwasong-12A to use fuel ampoulization. However, in its first launch, no canister was shown in images released by North Korean state media, suggesting that it is akin to the Soviet and Russian practice of preloading propellants to submarine-launched ballistic missiles and sealed it before installing onto the launcher.

== History ==
North Korea first tested MaRVs in 2017, with the Scud-derived KN-18 and KN-21. (Note: KN-18 and KN-21 are the external names given by the United States to these missiles.) North Korea claimed successful launch test of KN-18 on 28 May 2017 since it hit the target with only 7 m (23 ft) error. Later, during the 8th Congress of the Workers' Party of Korea held in January 2021, North Korea listed the development of hypersonic weapon in its five-year of defense capabilities enhancement plan.

In October 2021, Hwasong-12A was first displayed in "Self-Defence 2021" military exhibition between Hwasong-12 and Pukguksong-5, but the name was not revealed, unlike Hwasong-11B, which had the name confirmed in this event. At the same event, photos of TEL and launching tests of this missile was also shown on the board with blurred name tag. This name tag suggests this missile already has official designation, as North Korean double arrow brackets (《》) used for missile name designation was shown on the name tag.

On 5 January 2022, North Korea tested the missile. Since North Korean naming convention uses "hyŏng" (형; lit. 'type') instead of "ho" (호; lit. 'number'), South Korean researchers unofficially named this missile as Hypersonic Missile Type 2. South Korean Joint Chiefs of Staff publicized that actual distance of the missile trajectory was less than 700 km (430 mi), but the velocity was about Mach 6. After the official briefing one anonymous official asserted that this missile only has MaRV technology that the Hyunmoo-2C has, and the terminology 'hypersonic' does not match this missile. A day after the launch, the Korean Central News Agency (KCNA) reported that Hwasong-12A made a 120 km (75 mi)-long lateral movement before hitting a target 700 km (430 mi) away, despite the initial assessment of 500 km (310 mi) from the Japanese Defense Ministry. This could account for the range discrepancy if the glider separation happened at low altitude and so was not picked up by Japanese sensors.

Just days after the first test, on 11 January 2022, North Korea launched this missile for the second time. Kim Jong Un observed the test and KCNA reported it involved a hypersonic glide vehicle, which after its release from the rocket booster demonstrated "glide jump flight" and "corkscrew maneuvering" before landing 1,000 km (620 mi) away. South Korea's JCS claimed the missile flew 700 km (430 mi) at a maximum speed of around Mach 10; although they had claimed North Korea exaggerated the details of their previous test, with this one they stated it had demonstrated "more advanced capability" compared to the last test, though how was not explained. While observers believe North Korea is still years away from developing a credible hypersonic system, Kim's attendance and state media's description of the launch as a "final test-fire" could indicate that the weapon may be operational deployed relatively soon. Japanese Minister of Defense Nobuo Kishi described the missile as hypersonic, as North Korea described it.

During a military parade on 25 April 2022, North Korea displayed six Hwasong-12A missiles. However, these missiles were not officially named.

The Hwasong-12A designation was first suggested by German expert Norbert Brügge after test-fires. Later, the Bulletin of the Atomic Scientists suggested it to be the official name of the missile in an article published in July 2024 based on the confirmed name of Hwasong-12B; however, it remains unconfirmed, as the missile have its formal name unreported by North Korean state media.

== List of tests ==
=== Confirmed tests ===
Attempt	Date	Location	Pre-launch announcement or detection	Outcome	Additional notes	References
1	5 January 2022	Chagang Province	None	Success	The second known hypersonic missile test by North Korea, with KCNA announcing that the test was successful. The missile made a 120 km (75 mi) lateral movement and "precisely" hit a set target 700 km (430 mi) away. However, officials in South Korea's defense ministry mentioned that the KCNA's announcement was "exaggerated".	
2	11 January 2022	Chagang Province	None	Success	South Korean Joint Chiefs of Staff said that the missile had flown 700 km (430 mi) with an apogee of 60 km (37 mi) at a maximum speed of around Mach 10 (12,300 km/h; 7,610 mph) before landing. However, the Korean Central News Agency claimed the missile flew 1,000 km (620 mi) before hitting the sea target. Kim Jong Un supervised the launch with his sister Kim Yo Jong, with the former attending a missile test after 661 days without visiting it.	

=== Alleged tests ===
During the "Self-Defence 2021" military exhibition held in October 2021, images of two unannounced Hwasong-12A test-fires were shown. These launches appear to occur before its first confirmed test.

American astronomer and astrophysicist Jonathan McDowell claimed that the Hwasong-12A was used for following tests occurred on these dates (Pyongyang time):

- 27 February 2022
- 5 March 2022
- 5 May 2022
- 25 May 2022 (two tests)

According to Jonathan McDowell, four of five tests were to evaluate reconnaissance satellite components.
