= Hwasong-16B =

Newest line of solid-fuel IRBM tested by North Korea in 2024

- Type: Intermediate-range ballistic missile
- Place of origin: North Korea

Service history
- In service: 2024–present
- Used by: Korean People's Army Strategic Force; DPRK Missile Administration

Production history
- Designed: 2024
- Manufacturer: North Korea

Specifications
- Length: 21 m (69 ft) (estimated)
- Diameter: 2.1 m (6.9 ft) (estimated)
- Warhead: Hypersonic glide vehicle Nuclear or conventional unitary warhead
- Propellant: solid-fueled
- Operational range: 3,000–5,500 km (1,900–3,400 mi) (estimated)
- Maximum speed: Mach 15 – Mach 18 (18,400–22,100 km/h) (estimated); Mach 12 (14,700 km/h) (tested)
- Launch platform: 7-axle transporter erector launcher (TEL)

The Hwasong-16B (Note: Also known as Hwasong-16Na, Hwasongpho-16Na and Hwasongpho-16B.) (Korean: 《화성포-16나》형; lit. 'Mars Artillery Type 16B') is a North Korean intermediate-range ballistic missile (IRBM). First test-fired on 2 April 2024, Hwasong-16B is the third North Korean ballistic missile capable of carrying hypersonic glide vehicle (HGV) after Hwasong-8 and Hwasong-12B, as well as the first solid-fueled IRBM of North Korea.

== Description ==
Images of the Hwasong-16B
- 7-axle TEL
- Launch of the missile

Hwasong-16B is a two-stage, solid-fueled missile. It is estimated to be 21 m (69 ft) long and 2.1 m (6.9 ft) wide. The length of the first and second stage boosters are also judged to be 10.6 m (35 ft) and 5.6 m (18 ft), respectively. The HGV payload is also claimed to have a length of 4.8 m (16 ft). It is launched from a seven-axle wheeled transporter erector launcher (TEL). The open-front canister, which in its stored state, has a two-part clam-shell cover on each side. The missile is cold-launched with a gas generator at the end of the launch tube, popping the missile up prior to ignition.

Based on information released after the January 2025 test, it was determined that the Hwasong-16B's engine body used a new composite carbon fiber material. Its estimated range is about 3,000–5,500 km (1,900–3,400 mi); however, if North Korea increases the Hwasong-16B's range to 6,000 km (3,700 mi), it can attack the US military bases in Alaska. Using Hwasong-16B platform, if North Korea reduces the missile structural weight and uses high-energy solid propellant, Hwasong-16B can achieve 8,000 km (5,000 mi) range and become an intercontinental ballistic missile (ICBM). Also, Hwasong-16B may be a replacement for the liquid-fueled Hwasong-12 in the future.

Data from test-fires showed that Hwasong-16B reached a maximum speed of Mach 12 (14,700 km/h). However, the estimated maximum speed of the missile is Mach 15 – Mach 18 (18,400–22,100 km/h). According to North Korea, Hwasong-16B have the capablility of evading missile defenses, while its performance is considered "cannot be ignored worldwide".

The missile can also be armed with a nuclear or conventional unitary warhead.

== History ==
A military parade on 10 October 2020 unveiled the existence of an intercontinental ballistic missile (ICBM), larger than the Hwasong-15 and mounted on 11-axle launchers. It was unofficially dubbed the "Hwasong-16" as part of the Hwasong missile series, though subsequent analysis of footage indicated that it was officially called Hwasong-17.

In November 2023, North Korea announced static ground tests of rocket motors for a solid-fueled IRBM.

On 14 January 2024, North Korea test-fired a solid-fueled hypersonic IRBM, but the missile used for the test was Hwasong-16A, and it was not counted as an official test of Hwasong-16B. After this test, on 19 March 2024, Kim Jong Un oversaw an initial solid-fuel engine test in preparation for another launch.

Hwasong-16B officially made its public debut on 2 April 2024, with a flight test. This launch was made with a HGV payload akin to the one mounted on the Hwasong-8. Another test-fire of Hwasong-16B occurred on 6 January 2025.

== List of tests ==
Attempt	Date	Location	Pre-launch announcement	Outcome	Additional notes	References
1	2 April 2024, 6:53 am Pyongyang Standard Time	Outskirts of Pyongyang	None	Success	First test where the missile was named as Hwasong-16B. The Korean Central News Agency (KCNA) claimed the missile traveled 1,000 km (620 mi) and reached a maximum altitude of 101.1 km (62.8 mi), and subsequently engaged in a pull-up maneuver reaching an altitude of 72.3 km (44.9 mi). South Korean military assessments said it flew 600 km (370 mi), while Japan's Ministry of Defense estimated a range of 650 km (400 mi), suggesting the HGV test was not successful. Kim Jong Un supervised the launch, with senior officials attending. The launch coincided with a joint US/Japan/South Korea trilateral flight exercise.	
2	6 January 2025, around 12:00 pm Pyongyang Standard Time	Outskirts of Pyongyang	None	Success	Japanese and South Korean data showed the missile flew approximately 1,100 km (680 mi). Japan also stated that the missile's apogee was around 100 km (62 mi). North Korean data showed the missile flew 1,500 km (930 mi), with a first apogee of 99.8 km (62.0 mi) and a secondary apogee of 42.5 km (26.4 mi). The maximum speed was Mach 12 (14,700 km/h). However, according to South Korean military, the KCNA's report was most likely exaggerated, as South Korea did not detect a secondary apogee and the detected range was around 1,100 km (680 mi). The launch was supervised by Kim Jong Un and his daughter.	

=== Responses after Hwasong-16B's maiden flight ===
Carnegie Endowment for International Peace researcher Ankit Panda, described the transition to solid-fuel rockets as a heavily favored play by Kim, noting that "There are obvious strategic advantages to an all-solid-fuel force for them in the form of greater promptness, responsiveness, and survivability,"

The launch was condemned by the United Kingdom as a breach of United Nations Security Council resolutions. while Japan's Prime Minister Fumio Kishida also condemned it as "damaging for regional and international peace and stability".

South Korea's Ministry of Foreign Affairs confirmed a joint investigation ongoing with the U.S., and subsequently on 3 April 2024 it seized a ship off the coast of South Korea in violation of North Korean sanctions.

== Variants ==
=== MaRV variant ===
Prior to the April 2024 test of Hwasong-16B with hypersonic glide vehicle (HGV), in January 2024, a variant of Hwasong-16B with maneuverable reentry vehicle (MaRV) was tested. The official name of this variant may be Hwasong-16A, but it remains unconfirmed.

=== MIRV test vehicle ===
The two-stage solid-propellant booster, which was used for the tests of Hwasong-16A and Hwasong-16B, was unofficially called as Hwasong-16. It is based on the Hwasong-18 solid-fueled ICBM. This booster is believed to be an unconfirmed road-moblie, solid-fueled IRBM with possible MIRV-capable.

On 26 June 2024, North Korea test-fired a missile using the first stage of Hwasong-16 to test multiple independently-targeted reentry vehicles (MIRVs). The missile that had the first stage to be used in this test was not officially named, instead, North Korean state media depicting it as an "intermediate-range solid-fuel ballistic missile" and claimed the test was a success, with the three warheads being guided to their targets. South Korean military detected the launch around 5:30 a.m. and claimed that North Korea possibly launched a hypersonic missile. According to South Korea and Japan, the missile flew 250 km (160 mi) with an apogee of 100 km (62 mi), failed to release any warhead and exploded in midair before falling into Sea of Japan.

The nose cone of the MIRV test vehicle resembles that of Hwasong-17.

== In popular culture ==
After the first successful test, on 27 July 2024, the Korea Stamp Corporation unveiled postage stamps featuring Hwasong-16B.

== See also ==
Related development

- Hwasong-8
- Hwasong-11E
- Hwasong-12B
- Hwasong-18

Comparable missiles

- DF-17 and DF-ZF
- DF-26
- RSD-10
- Agni-III
