= Hwasong-20 =

North Korean ICBM under development

- Type: Intercontinental ballistic missile
- Place of origin: North Korea

Service history
- In service: Under development

Production history
- Designed: 2025
- Manufacturer: North Korea

Specifications
- Warhead: Nuclear warhead MIRV-capable
- Engine: Solid-fueled engine: Original: 1,960–1,971 kN (199.9–201.0 tf); Upgraded: 2,500 kN (250 tf)
- Operational range: Estimated: 15,000 km (9,300 mi) to over 16,000 km (9,900 mi)
- Maximum speed: Mach 22 (27,000 km/h; 16,700 mph)
- Guidance system: Inertial guidance system
- Accuracy: Estimated: 3–5 km (1.9–3.1 mi)
- Launch platform: 11-axle TEL

The Hwasong-20 (Note: Officially called Hwasongpho-20.) (Korean: 《화성포-20》형; lit. 'Mars Artillery Type 20') is a North Korean solid-fueled intercontinental ballistic missile (ICBM). First revealed in September 2025 at a press report, Hwasong-20 is considered by North Korean state media as "the most powerful nuclear strategic weapon". Its first appearance was on 10 October 2025, during a military parade.

== Description ==
Images of the Hwasong-20
- The missile and TEL in the "Defense Development-2025" military exhibition
- The TEL in the October 2025 parade

=== Missile ===
The Hwasong-20 is officially called "next-generation" ICBM by the state-owned Korean Central News Agency. Although detailed specifications remain little known, Hwasong-20 is assessed to be a three-stage, solid-fueled missile, estimated to have a wider body diameter than Hwasong-19. It is mobile, hard to detect and can be launched at short notice.

With an estimated operational range of 15,000 km (9,300 mi), Hwasong-20 can theoretically reach all territories of the United States. However, the October 2026 display in the National Defense Revolution Museum indicates that Hwasong-20 can reach Middle East, South America and Australia, suggesting a possible range of over 16,000 km (9,900 mi). In addition, a Korean Central Television commentator claims Hwasong-20 to have a "limitless" range. The missile's maximum speed is estimated to be Mach 22 (27,000 km/h; 16,700 mph), meaning Hwasong-20 can reach cities within the contiguous United States between 25 and 40 minutes.

The missile uses an advanced guidance system, combining inertial guidance system (INS) with GPS or optical sensors to increase accuracy, with an estimated circular error probable of 3–5 km (1.9–3.1 mi). South Korea's Joint Chiefs of Staff alleges that North Korea may have received Russian technology assistance and support to develop Hwasong-20.

According to a 2025 publication by Vann H. Van Diepen in 38 North, it is possible that Hwasong-20 is an up-named variant of Hwasong-19 for political or propaganda purposes.

=== Warhead ===
Hwasong-20 features a blunt warhead design, suggesting the missile is MIRV-capable, capable of evading United States's missile defenses. The estimated payload mass is more than two metric tonnes, including a possible number of six to eight re-entry vehicles, which appears to be higher than Hwasong-19.

According to an information board at the October 2026 display in the National Defense Revolution Museum, Hwasong-20 appears to be equipped with three sets of two reentry vehicles, with one pointing up and one pointing down each set.

=== Engine ===
North Korean press releases indicate that Hwasong-20 will use a 1,960–1,971 kN (199.9–201.0 tf)-thrust solid-fueled engine. It is manufactured using carbon fiber composite and has about 40 percent more thrust than the Hwasong-18. Analysts allege that this engine can be modified to be used for reconnaissance satellite launches.

Hwasong-20 may also have an upgraded version with a 2,500 kN (250 tf)-thrust engine, revealed in late-March 2026 by North Korean state media without citing exact date of ground-testing.

=== Launch vehicle ===
Like the Hwasong-19, Hwasong-20 uses a 11-axle TEL. However, images show the missile canister has a blunter nose cap than its predecessor's counterpart, and the lifting arms also apparently locate under the canister, instead of the vehicle's side.

== History ==
North Korea first mentioned Hwasong-20 on 2 September 2025 at a press report. According to North Korean state media, between 2023 and 2 September 2025, the Hwasong-20's engine underwent eight static firing tests. This is the first time North Korea has revealed details of a new ICBM under development.

Later, on 8 September 2025, the Missile Administration and the Academy of Chemical Materials conducted the ninth and last ground test of this engine. North Korean leader Kim Jong Un oversaw the test. According to North Korean state media, the engine produced a thrust of 1,971 kN (201.0 tf). This engine test suggested the launch of Hwasong-20 may take place soon.

Hwasong-20 made its public debut on 10 October 2025, during a military parade marking the 80th anniversary of the ruling Workers' Party of Korea. In this parade, North Korea called Hwasong-20 the "most powerful nuclear strategic weapon". At least three missiles were mounted on 11-axle launchers. It is possible that these missiles were mock-ups, as North Korea's MIRV technology has not been verified.

After the 10 October 2025 military parade, it was revealed that the Hwasong-20 was displayed during the "Defense Development-2025" military exhibition, opened on 4 October 2025. Originally, the missile and its associated TEL were assessed to be Hwasong-19.

In October 2026, Hwasong-20 was displayed in the newly-opened National Defense Revolution Museum. According to 38 North, the missile was intended "to be the star of the show" despite remaining untested.

== See also ==
- LGM-118 Peacekeeper
- LGM-35 Sentinel
- DF-61
