= Hwasong-11 =

North Korean class of ballistic missile

The Hwasong-11 (Note: Also called Hwasongpho-11.) (Korean: 화성-11; lit. 'Mars 11') is a class of single-stage, solid-fueled, short-range ballistic missile produced by North Korea. Originally started from the KN-02 Toksa in early 2000s, Hwasong-11 series undergone a multi-year development process before evolution started from 2019 with Hwasong-11A and Hwasong-11B. Since then, North Korea revealed further Hwasong-11-series designs with changes in range, warhead, maneuverability, and deployment methods.

== Description ==
The missiles in the Hwasong-11 series, including the original version, the Hwasong-11A and the 11B, are single-stage, solid-fueled. Compared with older Scud-based Hwasong-5 and Hwasong-6, missiles in Hwasong-11 series have a significant advancement in mobility, survivability and accuracy.

The post-2019 variants of Hwasong-11 series appear to have difference in size, range and deployment methods. Some variants have a road-mobile launchers, such as Hwasong-11E (5-axle launcher) and Hwasong-11E-1 (6-axle launcher), while Hwasong-11S is developed for underwater-based launches.

The missiles are manufactured at the February 11 Plant, part of the Ryongsong Machine Complex, located in Hamhung, North Korea. The February 11 Plant appears to be the sole known facility for producing these missiles.

== History ==
The Hwasong-11 series has a long development history. Initially, its original missile was known as KN-02. Starting from 2019, the series entered a new phase of development phase with the appearance of variants such as Hwasong-11A and Hwasong-11B, before progressively unveilling further designs including Hwasong-11C, Hwasong-11D, Hwasong-11E and Hwasong-11S.

In November 2024, satellite imagery indicated that the February 11 Plant underwent expansion. In 2025 and 2026, images from multiple Kim Jong Un visits to missile factories suggested the Hwasong-11 series (including Hwasong-11A) had entered mass production.

== Missiles ==
=== Original Hwasong-11 ===
The original Hwasong-11 (《화성-11》형; lit. 'Mars Type 11'), commonly known outside North Korea by its external designations KN-02 (Note: The KN number is the designation given by the United States to North Korean missiles.) and Toksa (독사; lit. 'Viper') is a reverse-engineered, locally produced modification of the Soviet's OTR-21 Tochka short-range ballistic missile.

The original Hwasong-11's maximum range is 120–170 km (75–106 mi). It is capable of being equipped with a 250 kg (550 lb) or 485 kg (1,069 lb) warhead. It was first tested in 2006.

=== Hwasong-11A ===
The Hwasong-11A (《화성포-11가》형; lit. 'Mars Type 11A') is a single-stage, solid-fueled short-range ballistic missile that has an external resemblance to the Russian Iskander-M and South Korean Hyunmoo-2B short-range ballistic missiles. It has a maximum range is 900 km (560 mi) and can be equipped with a 500 kg (1,100 lb) warhead at 690 km (430 mi).

Hwasong-11A made its public debut in 2018 and was first test-fired in May 2019. Before July 2023, the Hwasong-11A was known only by its United States designation. In July 2023, the missile's official designation was revealed.

Hwasong-11A also has further variants including Hwasong-11C, Hwasong-11D and Hwasong-11S.

=== Hwasong-11B ===
The Hwasong-11B (《화성포-11나》형; lit. 'Mars Artillery Type 11B') is a single-stage, solid-fueled short-range ballistic missile that has an external resemblance to the United States's ATACMS.

Hwasong-11B has a maximum range of 410 km (250 mi). It was test-fired in August 2019.

Beside the original black and white livery, the missile also has a beige-colored version, first shown in the "Self-Defence 2021" military exhibition, where the official designation was revealed.

=== Hwasong-11C ===
The Hwasong-11C (《화성포-11다》형; lit. 'Mars Artillery Type 11C') is the larger variant of Hwasong-11A with a closely similar design.

First tested in March 2021, the missile's range is assumed to be about 600 km (370 mi) with a 2,500 kg (5,500 lb) warhead. However, it may have a longer range with a lighter warhead, and the high-end estimation indicates a range of 900–1,000 km (560–620 mi).

In March 2023, North Korea revealed Hwasong-11C's formal designation. A larger version, called Hwasong-11C-4.5, was first test-fired in July 2024 with a 4,500 kg (9,900 lb) warhead.

=== Hwasong-11D ===
The Hwasong-11D (《화성포-11라》형; lit. 'Mars Artillery Type 11D') is the smaller variant of Hwasong-11A. The smallest short-range ballistic missile of North Korea, its range, which is estimated to be about 235 km (146 mi), led the missile to be classified as a close-range ballistic missile (CRBM). Hwasong-11D could be a counterpart to the South Korean's KTSSM, especially the role, and its launches were accompanied with a statement, associating them with the development of tactical nuclear weapons. Hwasong-11D may also have an advanced, 300 km (190 mi)-range variant.

Hwasong-11D made its public debut in April 2022 by a flight test; however, its official name was only revealed in March 2023. Its first direct mention from state media occurred in April 2026 as Hwasongpho-11 Ra.

=== Hwasong-11E ===
The Hwasong-11E (화성-11마; lit. 'Mars Type 11E') is a solid-fueled, short-range ballistic missile first displayed in October 2025 during a military exhibition. It is the hypersonic member of the Hwasong-11 series with hypersonic glide vehicle.

An apparent upgraded variant, called Hwasong-11E-1, was unveiled in September 2026 with a flight test.

=== Hwasong-11S ===
The Hwasong-11S (《화성포-11ㅅ》형; lit. 'Mars Artillery Type 11S') is the underwater-launched variant of Hwasong-11A. It was first displayed in October 2021, during the "Self-Defence 2021" military exhibition. Its first flight test also occurred in that month just after this event.

The missile's official name was revealed in March 2023.

== Activities related to Hwasong-11 ==
=== North Korean flight tests ===
According to Nuclear Threat Initiative, since 2013, North Korea has tested missiles in the Hwasong-11 series multiple times.

=== Russian use in Ukraine ===
During the Russo-Ukrainian war, there are multiple reports of missiles from the Hwasong-11 series being used by Russian forces since 2023.

According to declassified United States intelligence informations, in October 2023, an unknown number of North Korean ballistic missiles were transferred to Russia. Based on debris left by Russian attacks on Ukrainian targets on 30 December 2023, the ring housing the control vanes have been identified as the characteristics of Hwasong-11A and 11B missiles.

On 2 January 2024, during the Kharkiv strikes, Russia fired a missile that landed in Kharkiv. In April 2024, debris from this missile was confirmed by United Nations to be derived from a Hwasong-11-class missile.

In February 2024, Ukraine claimed to shoot down Hwasong-11B missiles, with Ukrainian media confirming an interception on 15 February near Kyiv. A day later, Ukrainian data showed 24 missiles, including Hwasong-11B, being used by Russia, allegedly with low accuracy.

In November 2024, data from Ukrainian defense intelligence unit showed that Russia received 100 ballistic missiles from North Korea. Ukrainian military intelligence claimed these missiles to be Hwasong-11A and 11B.

According to Ukraine, at the start of 2025, North Korea had supplied at least 148 Hwasong-11A and 11B missiles. Ukraine also claimed that the missile used in the 23 April 2025 Russian attack on civilians in Kyiv was Hwasong-11A.

In April 2026, a Ukrainian defense intelligence official claimed Russia upgraded the Hwasong-11A and 11B missiles by dramatically improving their accuracy to 1–5 m (3 ft 3 in – 16 ft 5 in) from at least 1 km (0.62 mi) in 2024. Also, another Ukrainian report revealed that these missiles used by Russia in 2024 were made using commercial electronics with outdated manufacturing methods (up to 50 years old) and used less energy-efficient fuel, requiring North Korean missiles to use larger engines to achieve the same range as Russian counterpart.

In August 2026, Ukraine claimed North Korea had supplied another batch of 40 Hwasong-11A and 11B missiles to Russia and would deploy a missile unit that could be equipped with six launchers and additional 120 missiles. Also in the same month, Ukrainian defense intelligence claimed that Hwasong-11C missiles were part of a new batch of around 50 ballistic missiles newly received by Russia from North Korea as of July 2026; however, there is no evidence to confirm Russian use of this missile in Ukraine.
