= KN-18 =

North Korean short-range ballistic missile

- Type: Short-range ballistic missile
- Place of origin: North Korea

Service history
- Used by: Korean People's Army Strategic Force

Production history
- Designed: 2017

Specifications
- Length: 11.5–11.9 m (38–39 ft)
- Warhead: Maneuverable reentry vehicle Possibly nuclear-capable
- Operational range: 450 km (280 mi) or more
- Accuracy: 7 m (23 ft) CEP
- Launch platform: Tracked TEL

KN-18 is the designation given by the United States government to a North Korean short-range ballistic missile (SRBM), whose official designation is unknown. A Scud missile variant with terminal maneuverability, the missile was first tested on 29 May 2017.

== Description ==
Images of the KN-18
- At the 15 April 2017 military parade
- May 2017 test

The KN-18 is a variant of Hwasong-6 (Scud-C) with terminal maneuverability. Initially, the KN-18 was assessed as an anti-ship ballistic missile, but it is incorrect. Other sources claim the KN-18 to be a variant of Hwasong-5 (Scud-B). Based from images, the missile's estimated length is judged to be about 11.5–11.9 m (38–39 ft).

The missile utilizes a liquid-fueled Scud booster and is equipped with a separable warhead. After engine burnout, the KN-18's warhead adjusts its trajectory to precisely strike the target. The missile's circular error probable is 7 m (23 ft), according to North Korean state media. The KN-18 has a range of 450 km (280 mi), based on information released after the first and only test-fire. The KN-18's launcher is a tracked chassis. Along with the maneuverable reentry vehicle, the KN-18 appears to be possibly nuclear-capable.

== History ==
The KN-18 was first displayed during a military parade on 15 April 2017 commemorating the 105th birthday of the late North Korean leader Kim Il Sung. Initially, the missile was designated by the United States as KN-17, but this designation was later used for Hwasong-12, an intermediate-range ballistic missile that had a successful test flight on 14 May 2017.

The KN-18's maiden test-flight occurred on 29 May 2017. After the test-fire, United States designated the missile as KN-18.

North Korea has never disclosed KN-18's official designation. It is not known whether the KN-18 is in production, and it is also possible that the KN-18 is superseded by newer solid-fueled SRBMs.

== List of tests ==
There has been one known test so far:

Attempt	Date (Pyongyang Standard Time)	Location	Outcome	Additional notes	References
1	29 May 2017; 05:40 a.m.	Kalma Airport, Wonsan	Success	The missile was tracked by the United States Pacific Command for six minutes, achieved 450 km (280 mi) range and 120 km (75 mi) apogee. The launch was supervised by Kim Jong Un.	

== See also ==
- Hwasong-12A
- Hwasong-16A
