= Hwasong-8 =

North Korean designation of ballistic missile

The Hwasong-8 (Korean: 《화성-8》형; lit. 'Mars Type 8') is a designation of North Korean ballistic missile. Originally, Hwasong-8 was reserved to an unknown single-stage, liquid-fueled ballistic missile that was an advanced version of Hwasong-6. However, it did not enter service within North Korean army, despite reported testing in 2000 and planned export. In September 2021, this designation was reused as the official name of a ballistic missile equipped with hypersonic glide vehicle that underwent the sole test flight on 28 September. It is possible that the 2021 designation of Hwasong-8 was changed to Hwasong-12B between 2021 and 2023.

== Original designation ==
Hwasong-8 (original designation)
- Type: Short-range ballistic missile

Service history
- Used by: Never entered service

Specifications
- Length: 12.4 m (41 ft)
- Warhead: 500 kg (1,100 lb)
- Engine: Liquid-propelled engine
- Operational range: 700 km (430 mi)

The Hwasong-8 designation was originally reserved to an unknown missile that was a derivative of Hwasong-6. Despite the reported testing in Syria in 2000 and planned export, it never entered service.

=== Description ===
According to NK News, the original Hwasong-8 is an "evolutionary" development of Hwasong-6, with a reported length of 12.4 m (41 ft). It has a range of 700 km (430 mi) with a 500 kg (1,100 lb) warhead. To achieve this, North Korea modified the Hwasong-6 by lengthening the missile body, rearranging instrument panel, reducing payload and possibly, switching the places of fuel and oxidizer tanks.

=== History ===
The original Hwasong-8 reportedly underwent testing in Syria in 2000. However, it remained unknown and never entered service, although North Korea might offer it to export as Scud-D.

== 2021 designation ==
Hwasong-8 (2021 designation)
- Type: Medium-range or intermediate-range ballistic missile

Service history
- Used by: Korean People's Army Strategic Force

Production history
- Designed: 2021

Specifications
- Length: 14.5–18.5 m (48–61 ft)
- Diameter: 1.4–1.8 m (4.6–5.9 ft)
- Warhead: Hypersonic glide vehicle "nuclear"
- Engine: Liquid-propelled engine
- Operational range: 2,000–4,000 km (1,200–2,500 mi)
- Guidance system: guided with vehicle
- Launch platform: 6-axle TEL

In late-September 2021, North Korea test-fired a hypersonic missile that reused the Hwasong-8 designation.

=== Description ===
Images of the Hwasong-8
- Launch of the missile
- The missile, as displayed in Self-Defence 2021

The 2021 version of Hwasong-8 is reported to be based on either a shortened Hwasong-14 first stage, or a Hwasong-12. However, the distance between the verniers and the main chamber on the motor suggest that the base of the missile is the Hwasong-14, as it has a slightly longer gap between those. Compared to the original Hwasong-14, the fuel tanks of the main stage would have been shortened by around a quarter.

The missile's length and diameter are estimated to be 14.5–18.5 m (48–61 ft) and 1.4–1.8 m (4.6–5.9 ft) respectively, while the re-entry vehicle is estimated to be 4.7 m (15 ft) long and 0.9 m (3.0 ft) wide. The maximum range of Hwasong-8 is estimated to be 2,000–4,000 km (1,200–2,500 mi).

Its payload is a hypersonic glide vehicle mounted on top of the missile, and has a shape typical to other such vehicles, such as the DF-ZF, with fins for the aerodynamic control of the vehicle while in flight. However, as data for the trajectory of the missile was not released, it is impossible to determine the trajectory of the reentry vehicle, although the missile was unlikely to have flown over Japan in a flatter trajectory, while a lofted trajectory is unsuitable for testing such vehicles, as the glide vehicle would then reenter at a near-vertical angle. Hwasong-8 is also claimed to be nuclear-capable.

The Hwasong-8's first test-fire is the sixth consecutive successful flight of the Paektusan (RD-250) rocket motor, which is also used by the Hwasong-12, -14 and -15. The test-fire also demonstrated other technologies, such as the ampoulisation of fuel, where fuel can be loaded into the missile months or years before a launch, reducing the time for preparing a launch of a liquid fuel missile. However, the actual impact of ampoulisation may have been overstated, as it appears that rather than the Soviet method of fueling and sealing the submarine-launched ballistic missile at the factory; instead, what is likely used is just the use of storable liquid fuel, which has probably already been practised on the Hwasong-10 and onwards, or the addition of membranes to seal off the propellent tank until launch. The use of 'ampoules' also signifies the importance of liquid fueled missiles in North Korea, that it is unlikely to develop a fully solid-fuel missile force, furthered by the fact that North Korea has had more experience with developing liquid fuel missiles.

According to the Joint Chief of Staff, the missile "could be intercepted", if it flies at a speed of Mach 3. However, if it can reach hypersonic speeds, it would be able to reach the southern regions of South Korea in around a minute, compared to five or six for a Scud missile, which could be too short a time to alert missile defences. Additional maneuverability from the hypersonic glide vehicle would give it a better chance at defeating missile defenses.

The missile displayed at the Self-Defence 2021 defence exhibition in October 2021 had some noticeable differences, compared to the version that was launched in September. In the exhibition, the warhead was most likely mounted on a Hwasong-12 and the missile was seen mounted on a MAZ-547, also used by the Hwasong-12, though that is a 'significantly' longer missile than was tested in September. It is unknown whether the main stage of the rocket used for the Hwasong-8 launch would be used for future launches, or be used for different payloads in the future.

Information from the 25 April 2022 military parade confirmed that the Hwasong-8's TEL is a six-axle chassis.

=== History ===
The plans to launch "hypersonic" missile were already indicated in the 8th Congress of the Workers' Party of Korea as part of the Five-Year Plan for Defense Science Development, where Kim Jong Un also listed other weapons, such as solid-fuel intercontinental ballistic missiles. Although North Korea already has missiles like the Hwasong-11A (KN-23) and Hwasong-11B (KN-24), gliding vehicles are likely more able to survive missile defenses, and the experience from these short-range missiles would have helped the development of this missile.

The new version of Hwasong-8 made its public debut on 28 September 2021, when a test-fire was carried out. On 11 October 2021, Hwasong-8 appeared at the "Self-Defence 2021" military exhibition. North Korea also displayed Hwasong-8 during a military parade on 25 April 2022.

It is possible that the Hwasong-8 was renamed to Hwasong-12B between September 2021 and July 2023.

=== List of tests ===
There has been one known test so far:

Attempt	Date	Location	Pre-launch announcement or detection	Outcome	Additional notes	References
1	28 September 2021	Toyang-ri, Ryongrim County, Chagang Province	None	Success	Pak Jong-chon oversaw the test, amongst other officials who also attended. According to North Korean state media, the test was to verify the fuel ampoulization system, as well as the warhead's maneuverability and gliding flight characteristics. However, the data, such as the trajectory of the missile, and the claimed range and apogee were not officially released by South Korea, but were instead from anonymous sources quoted by Yonhap, and nor was there an official assessment of the flight of the missile. The South Korean "anonymous" claim was a range less than 200 km (120 mi) and an apogee of 60 km (37 mi), while the Japanese Ministry of Defence said that it flew to 30 km (19 mi). The missile did not follow a ballistic trajectory and appeared to achieved a maximum speed of Mach 2.5 (3,060 km/h; 1,900 mph). It is possible that the reentry vehicle did not separate correctly, or the reentry vehicle flew under the coverage of South Korean radar.	

==== Impact of the 28 September 2021 test ====
According to an assessment from South Korean Joint Chiefs of Staff after the launch, Hwasong-8 is in the early stage of development, and that it would take North Korea "a significant amount of time" to deploy the missile.

The launch of the missile also served a political purpose, in demonstrating the government's ability to continue bolstering its deterrence, showing the accomplishments while also potentially giving legitimacy and prestige at a time where there is much attention paid towards hypersonic missiles. It also likely served an international purpose, as the launch had indeed attracted a wide range of attention, such as 'joining a race headed by major military powers to deploy the advanced weapons system', as Reuters wrote, or that it 'could change the military equation in East Asia', according to a CNN commentary. However, the majority of ballistic missiles of North Korea already reenter at hypersonic speeds, but the still improve chances in survival of the warhead, although these reentry vehicles are significantly more expensive than a traditional reentry vehicle, and is unlikely to form more than a small part of its missile force. This has also appeared to be part of a growing arms race in Korea, with this missile demonstrating its technological prowess over South Korea.

=== MaRV version ===
The 2021 version of Hwasong-8 has a version fitted with maneuverable reentry vehicle (MaRV). Its presumed official designation is Hwasong-12A. The missile is also known as Hypersonic Missile Type 2 (극초음속 미사일 2형) under South Korean naming convention.

It was test-fired twice, on 5 January and 11 January 2022.

== See also ==
Related development

- Hwasong-11E
- Hwasong-12B
- Hwasong-16B

Comparable missiles

- DF-17 and DF-ZF
