= Hwasong-16A =

North Korea hypersonic ballistic missile

Hwasong-16A (presumed)
- Type: Intermediate-range ballistic missile
- Place of origin: North Korea

Service history
- Used by: DPRK Missile Administration

Production history
- Designed: 2024
- Manufacturer: North Korea

Specifications
- Warhead: Maneuverable reentry vehicle
- Engine: Two-stage, solid-fueled engine
- Maximum speed: Tested: Mach 10 (12,300 km/h)

The Hwasong-16A (Korean: 《화성-16가》형; lit. 'Mars Type 16A') is presumed to be the official designation of a North Korean two-stage, solid-fueled hypersonic, intermediate-range ballistic missile first tested in January 2024.

== Description ==
Images of the Hwasong-16A
- Launch of the missile

The Hwasong-16A is a two-stage, solid-fueled missile, uses the same booster as Hwasong-16B, which is based on the Hwasong-18 solid-fueled ICBM. A solid-fuel IRBM would be able to threaten U.S. military bases such as on Guam as far as 3,400 km (2,100 mi) away from North Korea, while having the same advantages of being easier to move and faster to launch than the liquid-fueled Hwasong-12 IRBM. North Korean media also claimed the missile was equipped with a hypersonic warhead, similar to the conical, finned maneuverable reentry vehicle (MaRV) payload used on the Hwasong-12A, which was tested in January 2022. Such a payload would complicate ballistic missile defenses due to its lower altitude flight path keeping it below radar coverage longer and the ability to perform terminal maneuvers.

Data from its sole known test in January 2024 showed the missile had achieved a maximum speed of Mach 10 (12,300 km/h).

== History ==
In November 2023, North Korea announced static ground tests of solid-fueled engines for a solid-fueled IRBM.

On 14 January 2024, Hwasong-16A made its public debut with a flight test. According to North Korean state media, it was conducted by the DPRK Missile Administration, with the missile's formal name being unreported.

Its booster was used for the Hwasong-16B's maiden flight test on 2 April 2024. After the launch, the Hwasong-16A designation was suggested to be the missile's official name. However, it remains unconfirmed.

== List of tests ==
Attempt	Date (Pyongyang Standard Time)	Location	Pre-launch announcement	Outcome	Additional notes	References
1	14 January 2024, 2:55 p.m.	Around Pyongyang	None	Success	The first missile test of North Korea in 2024, South Korea claimed it travelled 1,000 km (620 mi), while Japanese data showed it flew at least 500 km (310 mi). According to North Korean state media, the launch was to verify the reliability of a new multi-stage, high-thrust solid-fuel engine and the hypersonic warhead. United States, Japan and South Korea condemned the launch.	

== See also ==
- Hwasong-12A
- Hwasong-16B
- Hwasong-18
