= Encyclopedia Astronautica =

Website on space topics up to 2019

- Main page
- Website type: Astronautics
- Available in: English
- Founded: 1994
- Creator: Mark Wade
- Website: www.astronautix.com

The Encyclopedia Astronautica is a reference web site on space travel. The encyclopedia includes 79,433 articles with 13,741 illustrations, a comprehensive catalog of missiles, spacecraft, space technology, astronauts, and spaceflight from most countries that have had an active rocket research program. It provides biographies of important pioneers of spaceflight such as Konstantin Tsiolkovsky, Hermann Oberth, and Robert Goddard. It outlines various concepts of space stations including the NASA Space Shuttle and the Soviet Buran programme.

== Articles ==
In addition, the encyclopedia contains many comprehensive review articles on specific space topics, among them:

- Germany incl. an extensive list of German missile specialists who worked for USA, USSR and France after World War II.
- Russia - Early Ballistic Missiles with a history of the involvement of German rocket specialists in Soviet rocketry.
- Russia: The Real Moon Landing Hoax about the Space Race.
- Russia: What did the CIA know and when did they know it? with an overview of the CIA's knowledge and assessments of Soviet missile technology.
- Historical data of space travel for each calendar day.

Since 2019, the site is no longer updated or maintained. Although it contains a great deal of information, not all of it is correct.

== History ==
Founded in 1994 and maintained for most of its existence by space enthusiast and author Mark Wade. He has been collecting such information for most of his life. Between 1996 and 2000 the site was hosted by Friends and Partners in Space.

== Reception and accolades ==
The American Astronautical Society gave the site the Ordway Award for Sustained Excellence in Spaceflight History, which "recognizes exceptional, sustained efforts to inform and educate on spaceflight and its history through one or more media", in 2015, the award's initial year. The award is named for U.S. space engineer and author Frederick I. Ordway III (1927–2014).

Telepolis journalist Marcus Hammerschmitt warmly recommended the Encyclopedia Astronautic to anyone interested in space flight, and speculated that its articles might become valued material for future researcher of cultural history.

In 2006, the American space historian Stephen B. Johnson stated that Encyplopedia Astronautica "has become a popular Internet source for space history. Unfortunately, while it contains a great deal of information, not all of it is correct. Space historians have noticed a variety of factual problems, and unfortunately these problems have not been consistently repaired. Since this is not a peer-reviewed source and historical errors have not always been fixed, this cannot be considered a reliable source, despite its impressive appearance. Many other online sources have the same problem."

== See also ==
- Jonathan's Space Report
- List of online encyclopedias
