= Jonathan's Space Report =

Newsletter about the Space Age

- Website type: Astronautics
- Available in: English
- Creator: Jonathan McDowell
- Website: planet4589.org/space/jsr/jsr.html
- Launched: 1989; 37 years ago
- Current status: active

Jonathan's Space Report (JSR) is a newsletter about the Space Age hosted at Jonathan's Space Page. It is written by Jonathan McDowell, a Center for Astrophysics | Harvard & Smithsonian astrophysicist. It is updated as McDowell's schedule permits, but he tries to publish two issues each month. Originally, the website was hosted on a Harvard University account, but it was moved in late 2003 to a dedicated domain.

Started in 1989, the newsletter reports on recent space launches, International Space Station activities, spacecraft developments, and newly released space-related data. McDowell's report occasionally corrects NASA's official web sites, or provides additional data on classified launches that are not available elsewhere.

Associated projects on the JSR web site are:

- A catalog of all known geosynchronous satellites and their current positions
- A listing of satellite launch attempts
- A cross-reference between catalog number and international designation of artificial satellites
- A photo archive covering many launch attempts
- A catalog of all spacecraft reentries

McDowell has long campaigned for U.S. compliance with the UN Convention on Registration of Outer Space Objects (1975) and UN Resolution 1721B (1961).

== See also ==
- Encyclopedia Astronautica
