= Hwasong-11C =

North Korean short-range ballistic missile

- Artist rendition of the missile
- Type: Short-range ballistic missile
- Place of origin: North Korea

Service history
- In service: 2021–present
- Used by: Korean People's Army Strategic Force; DPRK Missile Administration

Production history
- Designed: 2021
- Developed from: Hwasong-11A
- Developed into: Hwasong-11C-4.5; Hwasong-11E
- Produced: 2025–present

Specifications
- Length: 10.1 m (33 ft)
- Diameter: 1.26 m (4 ft 2 in)
- Warhead: 2,500 kg (5,500 lb); Hwasan-31
- Engine: Solid-propelled engine 406.871 kN (41.4893 tf)
- Operational range: 600–1,000 km (370–620 mi)
- Maximum speed: Mach 5 – Mach 6 (6,100–7,400 km/h; 3,800–4,600 mph)
- Accuracy: 1–5 m (3 ft 3 in – 16 ft 5 in)
- Launch platform: 10×10 wheeled TEL

The Hwasong-11C (Korean: 《화성포-11다》형; lit. 'Mars Artillery Type 11C') is a North Korean single-stage, solid-fueled short-range ballistic missile. It was first displayed during a military parade on 14 January 2021. A larger variant of the Hwasong-11A, Hwasong-11C has a heavier warhead compared to its baseline version, with the payload mass being claimed by North Korean state media as 2,500 kg (5,500 lb). First test of Hwasong-11C occurred on 25 March 2021 and mass production began in late 2025. In August 2026, Ukraine claimed Russia received Hwasong-11C missiles from North Korea.

Continued developments resulted in two further variants. In July 2024, a 4.5-ton warhead version Hwasong-11C was revealed. In late 2025, a Hwasong-11C-based design with hypersonic glide vehicle, called Hwasong-11E, was also unveiled.

== Description ==
Hwasong-11C is the enlarged variant of the Hwasong-11A, with a closely similar design. The missile's estimated length and diameter are 10.2 m (33 ft) and 1.26 m (4 ft 2 in), respectively, while its maximum range based on data from March 2021 test is estimated to be at least 600 km (370 mi). However, upper estimates indicate a longer range of from 900 km (560 mi) to 1,000 km (620 mi). Hwasong-11C's aeroballistic trajectory, low flight altitude of 50 km (31 mi) and maximum speed of Mach 5 – Mach 6 (6,100–7,400 km/h; 3,800–4,600 mph) make it harder for missile defenses to intercept. Recent upgrades (as of 2026) indicate a circular error probable of 1–5 m (3 ft 3 in – 16 ft 5 in).

Hwasong-11C is fitted to a longer wheeled TEL with an additional two sections. It is a 10×10 chassis capable of carrying missile in pairs. This TEL design allows rapid deployment and makes it less vulnerable to detection and preemtive strikes.

Based on information from the 25 March 2021 test, it appears that Hwasong-11C is longer compared with the base version. Its warhead is more conical and about 50 cm (20 in) longer than Hwasong-11A, and similar in shape to the Hwasong-11B. North Korea claims the missile to be equipped with a 2,500 kg (5,500 lb) warhead. According to 38 North, such a large warhead weight is almost certainly exaggerated. It is possible North Korea can use this claim for propaganda purpose, intended to give the impression that North Korea is keeping pace with their adversary's missile advancements, as the South Korean Hyunmoo-4 has a 2,000 kg (4,400 lb) warhead and the Hwasong-11C was proclaimed as the world's largest warhead weight. The new weapon may be able to almost completely cover South Korea from its launch site. If it can perform as claimed by North Korea, the weapon may be a powerful bunker buster weapon. This claim is not independently verified, and United Nations Security Council (UNSC) member states have questioned whether the 2.5-tonne warhead claim could refer to the entire weight of the missile after burnout, not just the warhead weight.

The missile also uses the most powerful known solid propellant rocket motor developed by North Korea as of December 2021. It is about 1 m (3 ft 3 in) longer and stronger than Hwasong-11A's engine, as Hwasong-11C's engine likely has an extra segment and produces a thrust of 406.871 kN (41.4893 tf).

If North Korea fires Hwasong-11C with an increased payload mass configuration, its actual range may be reduced. In contrast, according to a member state of the UNSC, the missile can have a longer range and become a medium-range ballistic missile (MRBM) if it is launched with a lighter payload configuration.

Alongside with heavy warhead, Hwasong-11C is also claimed to be capable of carrying the Hwasan-31 tactical nuclear warhead.

=== Naming ===
The official designation of Hwasong-11C was confirmed through photo evidence in March 2023. However, the blurred images led the suffix attached with the official name to confusing, and the name might also be read as Hwasong-11E, name of a hypersonic missile unveiled in late 2025. Other romanization variants also include Hwasong-11Da and Hwasongpho-11Da. However, in its earlier launches, the Hwasong-11C was simply referred to as "new-type tactical guided projectile" and later, "tactical ballistic missile".

On 23 September 2024, South Korean analyst Jo Jang-won wrote for the Sejong Institute, suggesting that the two sub-variants of Hwasong-11C were internally named Hwasongpho-11-Da-2.5 and Hwasongpho-11-Da-4.5.

Reportedly, before 2025, United States designated Hwasong-11C as KN-23A or KN-23B under their naming convention. However, in April 2025, it was revealed that these designations were unified to KN-30.

The name of Hwasong-11C's 4.5-ton warhead variant was revealed just after its maiden test in July 2024.

== History ==
Hwasong-11C made its public debut on 14 January 2021 during a military parade, with six Hwasong-11C launchers participating. North Korea did not name these missiles.

Hwasong-11C underwent its maiden flight test on 25 March 2021, the first North Korean state media-reported ballistic missile test since March 2020. It was organized by the Academy of Defence Sciences. A further test-fire occurred on 28 September 2022. Between the test-fires, Hwasong-11C was displayed in the "Self-Defence 2021" military exhibition, as well as the 25 April 2022 military parade, when twelve Hwasong-11C missiles mounted on 5-axle launchers were displayed.

The missile's official name was revealed in the Korean Central News Agency's report on the new Hwasan-31 nuclear warhead in late March 2023, and continued testing resulted in a 4.5-ton warhead variant in July 2024.

North Korea began mass production of Hwasong-11C in late 2025. According to the International Institute for Strategic Studies (IISS), as of 2026, North Korea is possessing more than six "in test" Hwasong-11C launchers.

=== Alleged transfer to Russia ===
There are speculations that Hwasong-11C has been deployed by Russian forces in its war against Ukraine. As of 2025, there is no evidence for the Hwasong-11C's transfer to Russia according to NK News.

On 20 August 2026, Ukrainian intelligence claimed that Hwasong-11C missiles were part of a new batch of around 50 ballistic missiles newly received by Russia from North Korea as of July 2026. It is the first known report of Hwasong-11C's transfer to Russia from a belligerent. A week later, on 27 August 2026, another Ukrainian intelligence report indicated Russia asked Hwasong-11C missiles from North Korea. However, there is no evidence to confirm Russian use of this missile in Ukraine.

== List of tests ==
=== Confirmed tests ===
Attempt	Date	Location	Number of missiles tested	Outcome	Additional notes	References
1	25 March 2021	Yonpo Airfield, near Hamhung and Sondok Airport, Chongpyong County (both in South Hamgyong Province)	2	Success	Initial data from South Korea and Japan showed the missiles were launched from Hamju County at 7:06 a.m. and 7:25 a.m. local time, with their analysis initially saying they only flew 420–450 km (260–280 mi) while reaching an apogee of 60 km (37 mi). Later, the missiles were confirmed to be launched from two different airfields located in South Hamgyong Province. According to North Korea, the "new-type tactical guided projectiles" flew 600 km (370 mi) and each missile was equipped with a 2,500 kg (5,500 lb) warhead. A month after the launch, South Korea revised their estimate and agreed with the North Korean statement of a 600 km (370 mi) range, saying the discrepancy resulted from blind spots in radar coverage due to the Earth's curvature.	
2	28 September 2022	Sunan, Pyongyang	2	Success	South Korea detected the launch at 6:10 p.m. and 6:20 p.m. local time from Sunan. Both missiles reached 50 km (31 mi) apogee and flew 300–350 km (190–220 mi). Information released by North Korea on 10 October 2022 confirmed the test-fire was a nuclear warhead loading and launch simulation test for "neutralizing the airports in the operation zones of south Korea", with Kim Jong Un attending. North Korea published images of the test without naming the missile.	
3	12 October 2026	Pyongyang	At least 1	Success	South Korea's Joint Chiefs of Staff tracked the launch of multiple ballistic missiles, one of which travelling 900 km (560 mi). Japan also detected two launches within a 17-minute interval, with the first missile achieving an apogee of 20 km (12 mi) while flying 220 km (140 mi), and the second one travelling 910 km (570 mi) out to an altitude of 70 km (43 mi). A day later, North Korea released information about the launch, saying a tactical ballistic missile was fired during a test of an upgraded missile core equipment organized by DPRK Missile Administration. South Korean media, citing reseachers, identified the missile as the baseline variant of Hwasong-11C, although North Korea did not provide details about it. However, according to NK News, the launch might also involve a variant of this missile.	

=== Alleged tests ===
Member states of the United Nations Security Council alleges that the then-unnamed Hwasong-11C was test-fired on 25 May 2022 and 5 June 2022.

American astrophysicist Jonathan McDowell claims another Hwasong-11C missile launch occurred on 1 July 2024, with the missile travelling 120 km (75 mi) and being launched with another missile, later confirmed to be its 4.5-ton warhead variant.

== Variants ==
=== Hwasong-11C-4.5 ===
Hwasong-11C-4.5
- Type: Short-range ballistic missile
- Place of origin: North Korea

Service history
- In service: 2024–present
- Used by: Korean People's Army Strategic Force; DPRK Missile Administration

Production history
- Designed: 2024

Specifications
- Warhead: 4,500 kg (9,900 lb)
- Engine: Solid-propelled engine
- Operational range: 500–900 km (310–560 mi)
- Flight altitude: 50–100 km (31–62 mi)
- Maximum speed: Mach 5 – Mach 6 (6,100–7,400 km/h; 3,800–4,600 mph)
- Guidance system: INS combined with satellite navigation
- Accuracy: 5–30 m (16–98 ft)
- Launch platform: Mobile TEL

The 4.5 tons warhead version of Hwasong-11C, called Hwasong-11C-4.5 (Note: Also known as Hwasong-11Da-4.5, Hwasongpho-11Da-4.5 and Hwasongpho-11Ta-4.5.) (《화성포-11다-4.5》; lit. 'Mars Artillery Type 11C-4.5') is named after its 4.5-ton warhead.

==== Description ====
Images of the Hwasong-11C-4.5
- September 2024 test
- Missile hitting target

Hwasong-11C-4.5 is capable of carrying a 4,500 kg (9,900 lb) warhead, an increase from the 2,500 kg (5,500 lb) warhead of the baseline Hwasong-11C. It is nine times heavier than Hwasong-11A's payload mass. This payload capacity focuses on countering larger targets, such as military bases, aircraft carriers and strategic infrastructures. It is developed due to the introduction of a Hyunmoo ballistic missile variant with super-large warhead by South Korea.

Hwasong-11C-4.5 can be launched from a road-mobile TEL, which is capable of carrying two missiles. Its range is estimated from 500 km (310 mi) to 900 km (560 mi), depending on payload capacity. It can flew in a quasi-ballistic trajectory, with a flight altitude of 50–100 km (31–62 mi). The missile uses a guidance system combining INS and satellite navigation, thus reducing CEP to 5–30 m (16–98 ft). The solid-fueled composite engine burns for 20–30 seconds, and the missile can achieve a speed of Mach 5 – Mach 6 (6,100–7,400 km/h; 3,800–4,600 mph) at terminal phase.

Assuming that the diameters of Hwasong-11C and its 4.5-ton warhead variant are similar, the Hwasong-11C-4.5 appears to be longer than its baseline version, possibly due to the lengthened missile body and heavier warhead.

==== History ====
In 2021, North Korean leader Kim Jong Un listed super-large warhead on its list of high-tech weapons that North Korea wanted to develop.

The first test flight of Hwasong-11C-4.5 occurred on 1 July 2024. A further launch took place on 18 September 2024, after some delays from a planned launch in July.

An alleged third test occurred on 22 October 2025, but it could also involved Hwasong-11E, given the "hypersonic projectile" claim by North Korea.

==== List of tests ====
Attempt	Date (Pyongyang Standard Time)	Location	Outcome	Additional notes	References
1	1 July 2024	Jangyon County, South Hwanghae Province	Success	North Korean statement did not carry photos of the test, but claimed that the missile was launched with a simulated 4.5 tons warhead to verify its flight stability and target accuracy. The minimum and maximum range stated by North Korea were 90 km (56 mi) and 500 km (310 mi), respectively. The test was carried out by the Missile Administration. According to South Korean military officials, the 1 July launch involved two missiles, one of which flew 120 km (75 mi) before disappearing from radar (likely failed), and the other flew 600 km (370 mi).	
2	18 September 2024	Kaechon Airport, South Pyongan Province	Success	The first test-fire with image publication of Hwasong-11C-4.5, it was conducted with two 4.5-ton conventional warhead-armed missiles. It was organized by the Missile Administration and supervised by Kim Jong Un. The missile flew 320 km (200 mi) before hitting an inland target. A "strategic" cruise missile was also launched along with Hwasong-11C-4.5 in this test. According to South Korea, two missiles were launched and flew 400 km (250 mi). This test was likely delayed from a scheduled test in July 2024, which was planned to be conducted with a 250 km (160 mi) range.	
Unconfirmed	22 October 2025	Ryokpho District, Pyongyang	Success	South Korean military detected the launch of multiple ballistic missiles at 8:10 a.m., flying about 350 km (220 mi) before landing inland. However, given the description of "hypersonic projectiles" by North Korea, it is possible that the launch may also involve Hwasong-11E. North Korean state media confirmed the Missile Administration-organized launch, with two missiles being fired. It flew in a northeast direction and hit their preset target at Kwesang Peak, located in Orang County, North Hamgyong Province, 430 km (270 mi) away from launch point.	

=== Hwasong-11E ===
The Hwasong-11E is a Hwasong-11C-based missile with hypersonic glide vehicle. It was first displayed in October 2025 during a military exhibition, with the missile likely using the same booster and 5-axle TEL.

== See also ==
- Hwasong-11A
- Iskander-1000
- Hyunmoo-4
