= Hwasong-12B =

North Korean hypersonic ballistic missile

- Type: Intermediate-range ballistic missile
- Place of origin: North Korea

Service history
- Used by: Korean People's Army Strategic Force

Production history
- Manufacturer: North Korea

Specifications
- Warhead: Hypersonic glide vehicle
- Propellant: Liquid-fueled
- Operational range: Over 6,000 km (3,700 mi)
- Launch platform: 6-axle TEL

The Hwasong-12B (Note: Also known as Hwasong-12Na.) (Korean: 《화성-12나》형; lit. 'Mars Type 12B') is a North Korean single-stage, liquid-fueled hypersonic, intermediate-range ballistic missile. Unveiled in July 2023 during a military exhibition, Hwasong-12B is the second North Korean ballistic missile capable of carrying hypersonic glide vehicle (HGV) after Hwasong-8, as well as the third hypersonic missile of North Korea.

== Description ==
Images of the Hwasong-12B
- The information board with official name
- The missile and its TEL

The Hwasong-12B is a single-stage missile, powered by a liquid-propelled engine, carried by 6-axle transporter erector launchers. Although Hwasong-12B has never undergone flight testing, according to Ukrainian news website Militarnyi, its range is estimated to be over 6,000 km (3,700 mi).

The hypersonic glide vehicle (HGV) of Hwasong-12B is similar in shape to the vehicle used by the solid-fueled Hwasong-16B. It is likely mounted on a shortened, or a standard Hwasong-12 booster. Compared with Hwasong-8, the HGV of Hwasong-12B has some differences in fuselage and control fins. It is the second ballistic missile of North Korea capable of carrying hypersonic glide vehicle (HGV) after Hwasong-8 (launched in September 2021), and the third type of hypersonic missile overall after it and Hwasong-12A (tested in January 2022).

== History ==
North Korea first test-fired missile with hypersonic glide vehicle in September 2021, with Hwasong-8. According to German analyst Norbert Brügge, North Korea displayed two types of hypersonic glide vehicle (HGV) in a military parade on 25 April 2022.

Hwasong-12B made its public debut on 26 July 2023, during a military exhibition. At the time of debut, a bilingual information board in Korean and English was displayed to Kim Jong Un and Sergei Shoigu with the official name. The next day, North Korea displayed four Hwasong-12B missiles at a military parade.

It is possible that the Hwasong-12B was renamed from Hwasong-8 between September 2021 and July 2023. However, it seems unlikely, as the Hwasong-8 may be the name of the prototype hypersonic missile, and Hwasong-12B is planned to be the operational product. Although there has been no known test for this missile so far, Hwasong-12B was spotted during Kim Jong Un's visit to a missile base in October 2024, suggesting that it may be deployed without any flight testing.

== See also ==
Related development

- Hwasong-8
- Hwasong-11E
- Hwasong-12
- Hwasong-16B

Comparable missiles

- DF-17 and DF-ZF
- Long-Range Hypersonic Weapon
