= Hwasong-11A =

North Korean short-range ballistic missile

- Artist rendition of the missile
- Type: Short-range ballistic missile
- Place of origin: North Korea

Service history
- In service: 2019–present
- Used by: North Korea: Korean People's Army Strategic Force; DPRK Missile Administration; Russia
- Wars: Russo-Ukrainian war

Production history
- Designed: 2018
- Manufacturer: February 11 Plant
- Developed into: See § Variants

Specifications
- Mass: 3,415–8,729 kg (7,529–19,244 lb)
- Length: 8.77 m (28.8 ft)
- Diameter: 1.1 m (3 ft 7 in)
- Warhead: 500–1,500 kg (1,100–3,300 lb), nuclear and conventional
- Engine: Solid-fueled engine
- Propellant: Solid composite
- Operational range: 190–900 km (120–560 mi)
- Flight altitude: 50–60 km (31–37 mi)
- Guidance system: Inertial navigation system (INS), possible satellite navigation
- Accuracy: 35–200 m (115–656 ft)
- Launch platform: 8×8 wheeled TEL; Tracked launcher; Railway car; Silo

The Hwasong-11A (Korean: 《화성포-11가》형; lit. 'Mars Artillery Type 11A'), also known as KN-23 under the United States naming convention and other names, (Note: See § Naming.) is a North Korean single-stage, solid-fueled short-range ballistic missile (SRBM). Unveiled in February 2018 and first test-fired in May 2019, Hwasong-11A is the most notable variant of Hwasong-11 series of solid-fueled SRBMs. Analysts believe the missile, with its quasi-ballistic trajectory and a range of up to 900 km (560 mi), may be able to penetrate South Korean missile defenses. It can be launched from road-mobile platforms, railway car and silo. Variants of the Hwasong-11A include a larger warhead version, a smaller version and an underwater-launched version. The missile has been reported to be used by Russian forces during the Russo-Ukrainian war.

== Description ==
The Hwasong-11A bears an external resemblance to the Russian Iskander-M and South Korean Hyunmoo-2B short-range ballistic missiles (SRBMs), being distinguished by its elongated cable raceway, different jet vane actuators and smooth base. Like the Iskander-M, it flies in a quasi-ballistic trajectory, flattening out below an altitude of about 50 km (31 mi) where the atmosphere is dense enough so the missile's fins can change course along its flight path. However, it is significantly larger than the Iskander, with estimated length and diameter to be 8.77 m (28.8 ft) and 1.1 m (3 ft 7 in), respectively. The mass estimation of Hwasong-11A is also different, with the Center for Strategic and International Studies giving a mass of 3,415 kg (7,529 lb), while a 2026 assessment published by 38 North estimates it to be 8,729 kg (19,244 lb) for flight simulations. The missile is painted army green, as well as likely uses the same 1.1 m (3 ft 7 in) diameter motor as the Pukguksong-1. The motor is somewhat lengthened, having only one stage, compared to the Pukguksong-1. The motor has a very different structure, compared to the Iskander. Its TEL has more space for the missile, as it lacks the structure immediately after the cab.

Data from test-fires shows a minimum range of 190 km (120 mi) using depressed trajectory, with the maximum range being assessed as 900 km (560 mi), putting all of South Korea within range. It is believed that Hwasong-11A's maximum flight altitude is 50–60 km (31–37 mi). With a 500 kg (1,100 lb) warhead, the missile has an estimated range of 450 km (280 mi). The missile's warhead section has enough space for up to 1,500 kg (3,300 lb) of high explosives compared to 700 kg (1,500 lb) for Hwasong-5 (Scud-B) and 800 kg (1,800 lb) of 9K720 Iskander. It can be conventional, likely unitary, nuclear, or submunition, which can devastate large areas with high firepower. The Hwasong-11A is also capable of carrying the Hwasan-31 tactical nuclear warhead. Its active steering capability could make it accurate to within 35–200 m (115–656 ft) CEP, depending whether the missile uses satellite guidance or INS alone.

The Hwasong-11A's launch platform is diverse. It can be launched from a wheeled, four-axle transporter erector launcher (TEL), or a tracked one. Both are capable of carrying two missiles. However, the four-axle truck used in test-fires is different from the truck used to carrying the missile during 8 February 2018 military parade. Hwasong-11A also has railway-based mobile launch platform, as well as silo-based launcher.

The missile is likely to replace older liquid-fueled North Korean SRBMs, like the Hwasong-5 and Hwasong-6. Being solid-fueled and capable of rapid firing from mobile launchers, Hwasong-11A is difficult for an opposing force to locate and target, meaning it is ideal for fast and precise tactical attacks. Once launched, it is very hard to detect and be intercepted by traditional missile defense systems, as the missile can fly at low altitude, conduct a terminal "pull-up" maneuver, and have a short overall flight time. For example, Hwasong-11A's trajectory is too low or too high for THAAD and MIM-104 Patriot to intercept reliably, respectively. Its increased accuracy also reduces the number of missiles that would be needed to destroy a single target. It is capable of following non-ballistic trajectories, including depressed ballistic trajectories, pitch down to approach target from directly above, and range-extension using aerodynamic lift.

The Hwasong-11A is likely to feature some form of foreign involvement such as parts, as when compared to the later developed Hwasong-11B (KN-24), the Korean Central News Agency focuses mainly on the deployment of the missile, with little coverage on its research. While the Hwasong-11B are called "Juche projectiles", it is never mentioned for the Hwasong-11A. The focus on the combat-readiness of the system suggests that it had been deployed for a while but not tested, like the Hwasong-10. It still bears significant differences from the 9K720 Iskander.

=== Naming ===
As of 2026, North Korean state media refers to Hwasong-11A as Hwasongpho-11 Ka (《화성포-11가》형) and classified it as a tactical ballistic missile. It was first mentioned directly during a test in May 2025. Formerly, when the official designation of Hwasong-11A was revealed, its Korean name was "《화성-11가》형" (lit. 'Mars Type 11A'), sometimes romanized as Hwasong-11Ga, with the letter "Ga" being the first letter of the Korean alphabet. The official designation can also be alternatively romanized as Hwasongpho-11Ga or Hwasong-11Ka. However, as the missile and KN-02 Toksa, whose official designation is "Hwasong-11", are totally different missiles, the Hwasong-11A (and its subsequent variants) can not be called Hwasong-11.

In its earlier launches, occurred between 2019 and 2023, North Korea called Hwasong-11A by generic descriptive terms instead of the official designation, such as "tactical guided weapon", "tactical guided missile" and "tactical ballistic missile".

External designations and nicknames of Hwasong-11A include the alphanumeric codes of KN-23 and 19-1 SRBM, used by the United States and South Korea respectively. Analysts also call the missile Kimskander (a portmanteau of Kim Jong Un and Iskander), given its similarities to the Russian counterpart.

== History ==
In mid-October 2017, North Korea apparently tested a solid-fueled engine in Hamhung, possibly a static test of Hwasong-11A's engine.

North Korea first displayed the Hwasong-11A publicly in a military parade on 8 February 2018, when it was mounted on Taebaeksan wheeled launchers. More than a year later, on 4 May 2019, North Korea publicly tested Hwasong-11A for the first time. Five days later, North Korea test-fired another two missiles. On 17 May 2019, the missile was designated by the United States Forces Korea as KN-23. Further test-fires were carried out on 25 July and 6 August 2019, as well as in 2021, 2022 and 2023.

The official name of KN-23 was first suggested as Hwasong-11A in October 2021, after the confirmation of KN-24's official name. During the "Weaponry Exhibition-2023" military exhibition held in July 2023, North Korea confirmed this designation.

According to the International Institute for Strategic Studies (IISS), as of 2025, North Korea is possessing more than 17 Hwasong-11A launchers, in road- and rail-mobile variants.

Another launch of Hwasong-11A occurred on 8 May 2025, during a military drill that also involved KN-25. It was the first known Hwasong-11A launch since 2023. Further launches of this missile occurred in April and September 2026.

=== Mass production ===
In November 2024, satellite imagery revealed that the buildings at the February 11 Plant (Hamhung), used to manufacture ballistic missiles (including Hwasong-11A), were expanded, likely related to increased production.

Images published by North Korean state media during Kim Jong Un inspection to missile factories in December 2025 and June 2026 suggested Hwasong-11A had been entered mass production for conventional warfare, with approximately 90 non-warhead Hwasong-11A missiles showed in December 2025 visit and around 80 missile bodies in June 2026 visit.

=== Russian use in Ukraine ===
The Hwasong-11A has been identified to be used since at least December 2023 by Russian forces and possibly, one of North Korean missile units for a time, during the Russo-Ukrainian war. An unknown number of North Korean ballistic missiles were transferred to Russia in October 2023, according to declassified US intelligence informations. Based on debris left by Russian attacks on Ukrainian targets on 30 December 2023, the ring housing the control vanes have been identified as the characteristics of Hwasong-11A and Hwasong-11B missiles. The barometer on the missile was found to have a Hangul character, and various parts of the missile were stamped with the possible factory name.

According to the Conflict Armament Research (CAR), 75% of components in the guidance control system for the Hwasong-11A fired at Kharkiv are based on American parts. They also indicated that some of the missiles were newly produced.

During the Kharkiv strikes of 2 January 2024, Ukrainian authorities noted that the missiles used were of North Korean origin, noting that the shape and design were different than that of Iskander missiles. On 29 April 2024, the UNSC confirmed that the munitions used during the strike were that of Hwasong-11A missiles.

On 7 May 2024, Ukrainian sources reported that the missiles have a high failure rate. According to these officials, half of the North Korean missiles lost their programmed trajectories and exploded in the air. In August 2024, the CAR documented the debris of four additional North Korean ballistic missiles that landed in Ukraine. These debris, retrieved in Bila Tserkva, Vitrova Balka and Rozhivka, were identified as debris from North Korean missiles, likely from Hwasong-11A. In December 2024, during an interview, Ukrainian military official Andrii Cherniak claimed that Russia had used around 60 Hwasong-11A missiles in their attacks against Ukraine.

According to Ukraine, at the start of 2025, North Korea had supplied Russia 148 Hwasong-11A and 11B missiles. In February 2025, it was also reported the Hwasong-11A missiles used by Russia in Ukraine had an improved CEP of 50–100 m (160–330 ft). Ukraine also claimed that Russia launched Hwasong-11A in the 23 April 2025 Russian attack on Kyiv. Information from a Ukrainian source obtained by Reuters indicated that the Hwasong-11A missiles were armed with a 1,000 kg (2,200 lb) warhead.

In May 2025, the Multilateral Sanctions Monitoring Team (MSMT) published images of Hwasong-11A's debris collected in Ukraine.

In April 2026, a Ukrainian report revealed that North Korean ballistic missiles (including Hwasong-11A) used by Russia in 2024 were made using commercial electronics with outdated manufacturing methods (up to 50 years old) and used less energy-efficient fuel, requiring North Korean missiles to use larger engines to achieve the same range as Russian counterpart. Ukraine also confirmed that Hwasong-11A is not a direct copy or licensed production of Russia's Iskander. Four months later, Ukraine claimed that North Korea had supplied another batch of 40 Hwasong-11A and 11B missiles to Russia and would deploy a missile unit that could be equipped with six launchers and additional 120 missiles (including Hwasong-11A).

On 7 November 2026, Ukrainian president Volodymyr Zelenskyy claimed Russia fired 36 Hwasong-11A missiles toward Kyiv and surrounding areas during an overnight strike, with only four shot down by Ukrainian air defense system. Targets in this strike included a key energy facility.

== List of tests ==
=== Confirmed tests ===
Attempt	Date (Pyongyang Standard Time)	Location	Number of missiles tested	Outcome	Additional notes	References
1	4 May 2019	Hodo Peninsula, Kangwon Province	2	Success	These missiles reached an apogee of 60 km (37 mi) and a range of 240 km (150 mi). The footage was apparently manipulated, and the missiles were probably fired from two different vehicles. Kim Jong Un oversaw the test.	
2	9 May 2019	Baegun, North Pyongan Province or Kusong	2	Success	Both missiles achieved 50 km (31 mi) apogee. One had a range of 420 km (260 mi) and the other had 270 km (170 mi). At least one missile may have used depressed trajectory. Kim Jong Un supervised the test-fire.	
3	25 July 2019	Hodo Peninsula, Kangwon Province	2	Success	Both missiles again reaching 50 km (31 mi) in altitude, but demonstrating greater ranges of 430–690 km (270–430 mi), before landing in the Sea of Japan. Kim Jong Un supervised the test-fire.	
4	6 August 2019	Kwail Airport, South Hwanghae Province	2	Success	Two missiles were launched, overflew Pyongyang and achieved an apogee of 37 km (23 mi) out to 450 km (280 mi). Kim Jong Un supervised the test-fire.	
5	27 January 2022	Hungnam, Hamhung, South Hamgyong Province	2	Success	These missiles flew 190 km (120 mi) to a maximum altitude of 20 km (12 mi) and demonstrated depressed trajectory. North Korea stated the test was to confirm the power of an air burst conventional warhead. Taken together, this suggests that the missile is operational.	
6	1 October 2022	Sunan District, Pyongyang	2	Success	These missiles achieved 50 km (31 mi) apogee. One missile flew 400 km (250 mi), the other flew 350 km (220 mi). A part of military drills occurred between 25 September and 9 October 2022, Kim Jong Un oversaw the test.	
7	6 October 2022	Samsok District, Pyongyang	1	Success	The missile achieved 50 km (31 mi) apogee and flew 800 km (500 mi). It was launched just about 15 minutes after the launch of a KN-25 missile and may have used an irregular trajectory. A part of military drills occurred between 25 September and 9 October 2022, the launch was under Kim Jong Un supervision.	
8	14 March 2023	Jangyon County, South Hwanghae Province	2	Success	According to North Korea, these missiles hit the target 611.4 km (379.9 mi) away. South Korea said these missiles had flown 620 km (390 mi).	
9	27 March 2023	Chunghwa County, North Hwanghae Province or Ryokpho District, Pyongyang	2	Success	These missiles achieved 50 km (31 mi) apogee and flew 350 km (220 mi). According to North Korea, the missiles exploded at an altitude of about 500 m (1,600 ft) above a target near Kimchaek. The launch was a simulation test of an air-borne nuclear attack.	
10	8 May 2025	Wonsan	At least 1	Success	The missile achieved 100 km (62 mi) apogee, flew 800 km (500 mi) and was launched along with several KN-25 missiles. According to North Korea, the launch was to familiarize military units with the operation of the weapon systems (including Hwasong-11A) and assess the quick reaction reliability of the command and control system in any nuclear crisis. Kim Jong Un oversaw the test along with senior officials.	
11	8 April 2026	Wonsan	At least 1	Success	South Korean military detected launches throughout the morning and the afternoon on 8 April near Wonsan. The morning launch saw multiple ballistic missiles were fired and flew 240 km (150 mi). The afternoon launch involved another missile that travelled over 700 km (430 mi). Statement from North Korean state media mentioned a weapon test campaign occurred between 6–8 April, and one of the tests involved the submunition-armed Hwasong-11A that "can reduce to ashes" targets within an area of 6.5–7 ha (16–17 acres) with full firepower. There was another test-fire of a missile engine using low-cost materials that may also involve Hwasong-11A. The Korean Central News Agency did not publish any images of the test campaign.	
12	12 September 2026	South of Wonsan	At least 1	Success	The Hwasong-11A launch was the part of a broader attack drill involving "new combat systems", including KN-25, attack drones and Hwasal-series cruise missiles. However, in this launch, Hwasong-11A was called "tactical ballistic missile" instead of its formal name, unlike the May 2025 and April 2026 launches. South Korea detected the launch of several ballistic missiles at 5:20 a.m., flying about 250 km (160 mi). According to North Korean state media, who delayed the coverage to two days after the drill, the participated subunits were selected from five artillery and missile joint units.	

=== Alleged tests ===
Member states of the United Nations Security Council alleged that there were test-fires of Hwasong-11A on 5 June 2022 and 9 November 2022. It is also possible that a test of Hwasong-11A took place in June 2023, with two missiles being launched and one of which travelled 900 km (560 mi).

An alleged test-fire of Hwasong-11A took place on 4 January 2026, but it is highly likely that it involved Hwasong-11E, based on the description of "hypersonic missile" by North Korean state media.

Another alleged test-fire of Hwasong-11A occurred on 12 August 2026, when North Korea launched a single SRBM, travelling about 700 km (430 mi) and achieving 90 km (56 mi) apogee.

According to German analyst Norbert Brügge, North Korea might launch Hwasong-11A during an undated test, with an image showing a TEL of Hwasong-7.

== Variants ==
Along with the base version, Hwasong-11A has some variants:

=== Railway-borne missile ===
==== Design and development ====
North Korea has expressed interest in rail-mobile ballistic missile launchers for a long time, likely started in late-1980s and early-1990s. However, due to international sanctions, this interest accelerated in early 2000s. In early 2021, during the 8th Congress of the Workers' Party of Korea, a railway-borne missile regiment was founded.

On 15 September 2021, North Korea test-fired two missiles from a modified railway car, rather than the typical road-mobile launcher. These missiles appeared to be baseline Hwasong-11A versions, although North Korean state media did not mention it explicitly. They flew much further than any previous flight of the weapon, and went an even greater distance than the larger variant tested earlier in 2021. Such excess range could indicate it hadn't previously been tested out to its maximum range, or that the design underwent modifications such as a reduced payload or flight profile improvements. The launch railcar uses two side-by-side erector/launcher mechanisms like the side-by-side arrangement used in the TEL. The use of a rail-mobile system is unusual for an SRBM, as road-mobile launchers are easier for deploying and hiding relatively small missiles than the railway-borne. However, its enhanced mobility enables North Korea to launch missiles from anywhere in its rail network, and the train launchers can be disguised as passenger trains to avoid external surveillance, making it more difficult to be detected pre-launch. Adding railway launchers may also be an effort to further increase and diversify the country's SRBM missile force, since modifying existing railcars to fire missiles could be a way to supplement a limited number of launch trucks, or possibly to test the concept before applying it to intercontinental ballistic missiles (ICBMs). A rail-borne ICBM would have advantages over one carried by a wheeled TEL, as such large liquid-fueled missiles carried in railway cars would be able to move more places and be kept in a higher readiness state.

On 14 January 2022, North Korea again tested railway-launched Hwasong-11A. The next day, the Korean Central News Agency released photos of the test.

==== List of tests ====
Attempt	Date (Pyongyang Standard Time)	Location	Number of missiles tested	Outcome	Additional notes	Reference(s)
1	15 September 2021	Yangdok County, South Hamgyong Province	2	Success	These missiles were launched with a five-minute interval, travelled 800 km (500 mi) to a maximum altitude of 60 km (37 mi) before landing inside Japan's exclusive economic zone. Pak Jong-chon oversaw the test.	
2	14 January 2022	South of Uiju County, North Pyongan Province	2	Success	These missiles were launched without any prior notices, flew 430 km (270 mi) and achieved 36 km (22 mi) apogee.	
3	2 November 2022	Unknown	Unknown	Unknown	Information based on images released by the Korean Central News Agency on 7 November 2022. The missile appears to be railway-borne.	

=== Silo-based missile ===
==== Design and development ====
On 19 March 2023, North Korea test-fired a ballistic missile during a drill claimed by North Korean state media as nuclear counterattack simulation. The missile appeared to be Hwasong-11A, based on photos released by the Korean Central News Agency. The missile was fired from an underground silo, located within the Sohae Satellite Launching Station and constructed for less than two months. It is the first known missile launch from silo of North Korea. Images showed the rising, V-shaped exhaust flame, consistent with the launch from an underground silo.

The use of silo can help North Korea fire missiles with little warning while avoiding outside surveillance. However, given its vulnerability and operational unfavorables, the deployment of silo-based missiles may be limited, despite several economic advantages, including effective operation and maintenance cost, as well as low construction expense.

==== List of tests ====
Attempt	Date (Pyongyang Standard Time)	Location	Number of missiles tested	Outcome	Additional notes	References
1	19 March 2023	Sohae Satellite Launching Station	1	Success	The missile reached 50 km (31 mi) apogee, flew 800 km (500 mi) and was equipped with a simulated tacical nuclear warhead that detonated at an altitude of 800 m (2,600 ft). It may have utilized an irregular trajectory. Kim Jong Un and his daughter oversaw the test.	

=== Larger variant ===
Hwasong-11C is the larger version of Hwasong-11A, claimed to have a 2.5 tons warhead. It was first tested on 25 March 2021, with North Korean state media calling it "new-type tactical guided projectile".

A variant with 4.5 tons warhead, called Hwasong-11C-4.5, was tested on 1 July 2024 and 18 September 2024.

=== Smaller variant ===
Hwasong-11D is the smaller variant of Hwasong-11A, with reduced range. Its first test occurred on 16 April 2022 when North Korea called it "tactical guided weapon", and a test launch occurred on 19 April 2026 resulted in the publication of the official designation by KCNA.

=== Hypersonic glide vehicle variant ===
The Hwasong-11E is a Hwasong-11C-based variant of Hwasong-11A with hypersonic glide vehicle, first displayed in 2025 during a military exhibition. It highly likely underwent a test launch on 4 January 2026.

A variant of Hwasong-11E, named Hwasong-11E-1, was first tested on 20 September 2026.

=== SLBM variant ===
Hwasong-11S is the underwater-launched version of Hwasong-11A. It was tested on 19 October 2021 and 25 September 2022.

== See also ==
- Hwasong-11B – (North Korea) (KN-24)
- 9K720 Iskander – (Russia)
- Hyunmoo-2 – (South Korea)
