= DPRK Missile Administration =

Bureau that oversees the development of missiles for the Korean People's Army

- 미싸일총국
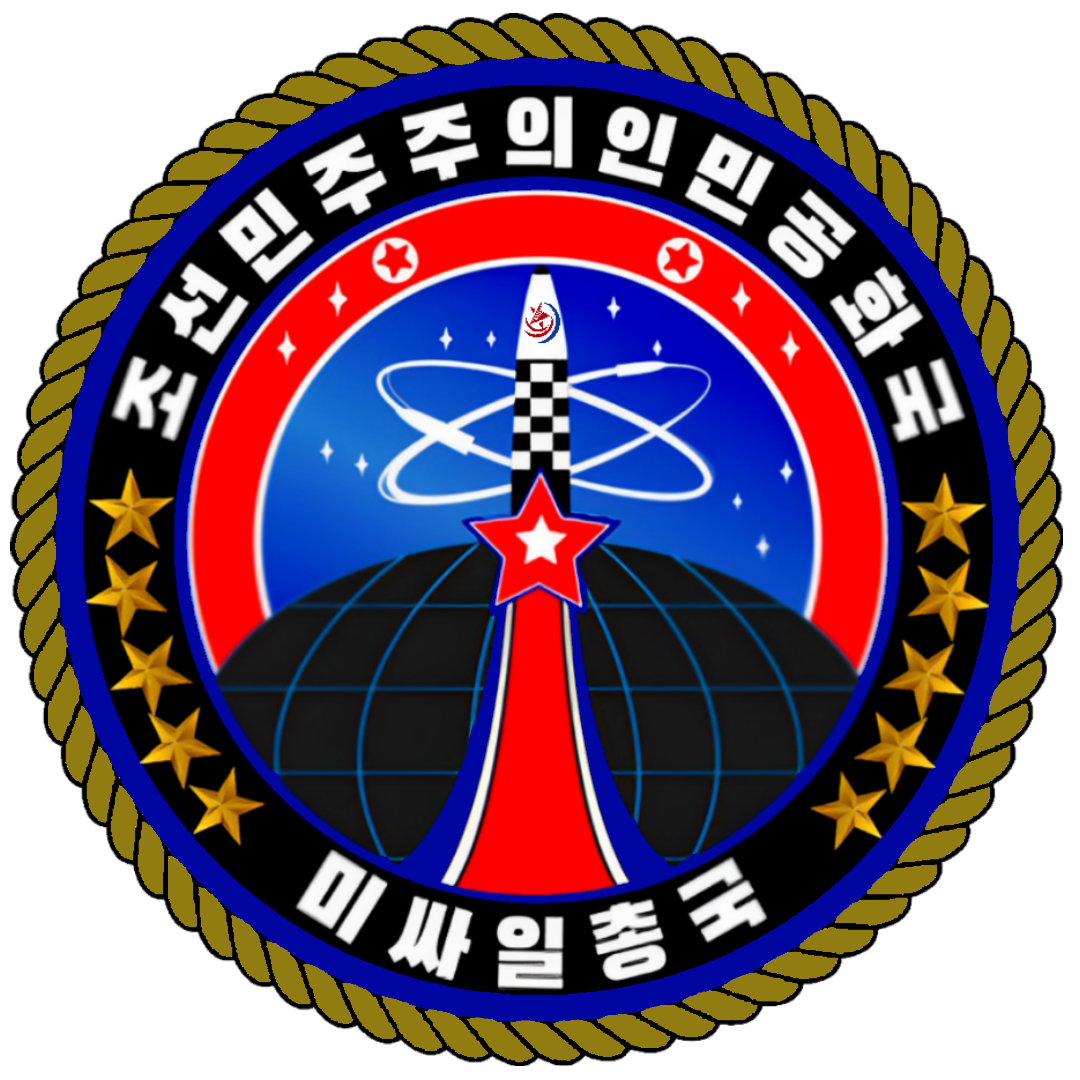
- Active: 30 April 2016; 10 years ago
- Country: North Korea
- Allegiance: Workers' Party of Korea
- Branch: Korean People's Army
- Type: Military research and development
- Size: Classified

Commanders
- General Director: General Jang Chang-ha
- Director (Note: Kim Ju Ae's alleged position in Missile Administration is described as akin to "director".): Respected Daughter Kim Ju Ae (Note: Not confirmed by North Korean state media.)

Insignia
- Flag: Front: Back:

- Insignia used by ICBMs

- DPRK Missile Administration
- Chosŏn'gŭl: 미싸일총국
- Hancha: 미싸일總局
- Revised Romanization: Missail Chongguk
- McCune–Reischauer: Missail Ch'ongguk

The Democratic People’s Republic of Korea (DPRK) Missile Administration (Korean: 미싸일총국; MR: missailch'ongguk) is a North Korean military organization within the Korean People's Army. Founded on 30 April 2016, it was first observed in February 2023 during an enlarged meeting. The Missile Administration oversees the development of North Korean missile program through research organizations and has conducted numerous missile launches since 2023, including intercontinental ballistic missile tests.

== History ==
The bureau was observed on the venue of the enlarged meeting of the Central Military Commission of the Workers' Party of Korea held on 7 February 2023 by showing its own flag and it was likely established in November 2022. However, information from the agency's flag suggests that it was established in 2016. The Missile Administration may be renamed from the United States-sanctioned Ministry of Rocket Industry.

As of 2026, the English name "DPRK Missile Administration" (or "Missile Administration of the DPRK") is used by North Korean state media. However, the agency was formerly referred to as "Missile General Bureau" and "General Missile Bureau" in English.

=== Major members ===
During a silo launch test for short-range ballistic missile Hwasong-11A on 19 March 2023, Kim Jong-sik and Jang Chang-ha were presumed to be the members of the new agency.

In February 2026, it was reported that Kim Jong Un's daughter, Kim Ju Ae, had been appointed within the Missile Administration.

As of October 2026, Jang Chang-ha is the Missile Administration's general director, according to North Korean state media.

== Symbols ==
=== Flag ===
The agency's flag features a Hwasong-17 missile flying over Earth against the symbolic atomic nucleus background. The motto inspected on flag reads "For the defense of the Democratic People's Republic of Korea and the security of its people!" (조선민주주의인민공화국의 안전과 인민의 안녕을 위하여).

=== Uniform ===
During a military parade commemorating the 75th founding anniversary of KPA, the soldiers wearing Missile General Bureau uniform and patch were observed standing next to the KPA soldiers on Hwasong-11A mobile launcher. At the same time, three different red-colored flags of ICBM units were observed.

== Organization ==
There are two missile test supervision companies within the Missile Administration:

- 1st Red Flag Hero Company (제1붉은기영웅중대)
- 2nd Red Flag Company (제2붉은기중대)

Research bodies within the Missile Administration include:

- General Academy of Chemical Materials
- Institute of Solid-fuel Engine
- Anti-Air Weapon System Research Bureau
- Ballistic Missile System Institute
- Warhead Institute
- Cruise Missile System Institute

The agency also has a football team named Hwasong, first known in September 2026. It is not known whether the team competes in DPR Korea Football League.

== Missile tests conducted ==
Date	Type of missile launched	Additional notes	Reference(s)
18 February 2023	Hwasong-15	The test was guided by the 1st Red Flag Hero Company affiliated with the Missile Administration (then Missile General Bureau). According to the Korean Central News Agency, the company "has rich launching experience among the units operating ICBMs".	
16 March 2023	Hwasong-17	Third test-fire of Hwasong-17.	
13 April 2023	Hwasong-18	The 2nd Red Flag Company affiliated with Missile General Bureau conducted the test. It is the first test-fire of Hwasong-18.	
12 July 2023	Hwasong-18	The test was organized by the 2nd Red Flag Company affiliated with Missile General Bureau. This is the second test launch of Hwasong-18.	
18 December 2023	Hwasong-18	The 2nd Red Flag Company affiliated with General Missile Bureau guided the test. This is the third test launch of Hwasong-18.	
14 January 2024	Hwasong-16A (presumed)	The missile was launched from the first test site of Hwasong-18.	
24 January 2024	Pulhwasal-3-31	First test-fire of Pulhwasal-3-31. According to North Korea, it is "under development".	
2 February 2024	Hwasal-1 Ra-3 and Pyoljji-1-2	North Korea did not name these missiles. The cruise missile was test-fired to evaluate super-large warhead.	
2 April 2024	Hwasong-16B	First test-fire of Hwasong-16B.	
20 April 2024	Hwasal-1 Ra-3 and Pyoljji-1-2	According to North Korea, the test-fire of Hwasal-1 Ra-3 was conducted to test super-large warhead.	
17 May 2024	Hwasong-11D	According to North Korea, the missile was fired to test new autonomous guidance technology.	
26 June 2024	MIRV test vehicle based on the Hwasong-16's first stage	The test-fire was conducted to test multiple independently-targeted reentry vehicles. North Korea claimed a successful launch, however, according to South Korea and Japan, the test was a failure. The nosecone of the MIRV test vehicle closely resembles that of Hwasong-17.	
1 July 2024	Hwasong-11C-4.5	First test-fire of Hwasong-11C-4.5. North Korea stated that the missile was launched with a simulated 4.5 tons warhead to verify its flight stability and target accuracy at the range of 90–500 km (56–311 mi).	
18 September 2024	Hwasong-11C-4.5 and Hwasal-1	Second test-fire of Hwasong-11C-4.5. North Korea also test-fired the upgraded version of the "strategic" cruise missile Hwasal-1 along with Hwasong-11C-4.5 in this test.	
31 October 2024	Hwasong-19	First test-fire of Hwasong-19. The test broke the apogee record for a North Korean missile test (as of November 2024).	
6 January 2025	Hwasong-16B	Second test-fire of Hwasong-16B.	
25 January 2025	Sea-to-ground strategic cruise missiles	North Korean state media did not mention the missile's official designation.	
20 March 2025	Latest anti-aircraft missile	North Korea did not name the missile.	
28–29 April 2025	Unknown	North Korea only confirmed its participation in the Choe Hyon destroyer's weapon systems test without specifying the missile fired by the Missile Administration.	
23 August 2025	Two types of new air defence missiles	These air defence missiles have "superior combat capability", as well as "unique and special technology".	
22 October 2025	Hypersonic projectiles	The launch may involve Hwasong-11C-4.5 or Hwasong-11E.	
28 October 2025	Sea-to-surface strategic cruise missiles	The missiles were possibly launched from Choe Hyon destroyer.	
24 December 2025	New-type anti-air missiles	The missiles hit the target at 200 km (120 mi) altitude.	
27 January 2026	KN-25 (four missiles)	North Korea claimed the test was "to verify the effectiveness of a large-caliber multiple rocket launcher system upgraded with new technology". The KN-25 missiles hit the target 358.5 km (222.8 mi) away.	
6–8 April 2026	Various	The tests involved a Hwasong-11A equipped with cluster warhead, a "mobile short-range anti-aircraft missile" and missiles equipped with graphite bomb, electromagnetic weapon system and "low-cost" missile engine. It was conducted by research agencies sanctioned by the Missile Administration.	
19 April 2026	Hwasong-11D (five missiles)	These upgraded missiles were equipped with cluster warhead and fragmentation mine warhead that hit an target area of 12.5–13 ha (31–32 acres) with very high firepower.	
26 May 2026	Various	Collaborative weapon test with Academy of Defence Sciences, involving a "multiple tactical cruise missile weapon system" and a lightweight, modular TEL that launched a Hwasong-11D missile and 240 mm multiple launch rockets.	
20 September 2026	Hwasong-11E-1	Images appear to confirm that the "combat weapon system" was a Hwasong-11-series hypersonic missile.	
12 October 2026	Hwasong-11C	According to NK News, the missile appears to be a variant of Hwasong-11C, with the mobile launcher apparently similar to the original missile.	
14 October 2026	Submarine-launched strategic cruise missiles (two types)	The first submarine-launched cruise missile launch since January 2024 Pulhwasal-3-31 test.	
15 October 2026	Zam-2.0	Collaborative torpedo test with Academy of Defence Science and Torpedo Weapon Research Bureau.	
31 October 2026	Hwasong-11D	Test of tactical ballistic missile's Standard Type 2 cluster bomb warhead, capable of "turning into ashes" an area of 12–13 ha (30–32 acres) at highest-density power.	
2 November 2026	Strategic cruise missile	Test of an unnamed strategic cruise missile's dispersal warhead and flight feature for vertical strike. The dispersal warhead is claimed to be capable of "turning into ashes" an area of 5–6 ha (12–15 acres) at full density power.	
4 November 2026	Unnamed surface-to-air missile system	Test of a new air-defense missile system, which occurred at the same time with a launch drill of long-range strategic cruise missile.	
9 November 2026	Unnamed torpedo	Collaborative torpedo test with Academy of Defence Sciences and Torpedo Weapon Research Bureau.	

== See also ==
- Academy of Defence Sciences
