= Hwasong-18 =

North Korean mobile intercontinental ballistic missile

- Type: Intercontinental ballistic missile
- Place of origin: North Korea

Service history
- In service: 2023–present
- Used by: Korean People's Army Strategic Force (Note: Based on a report about Hwasong-17 via Yonhap, Hwasong-18 is likely to have been transferred from the Strategic Force for use by Missile Administration (then Missile General Bureau).)

Production history
- Manufacturer: North Korea
- Produced: 2023–present
- No. built: Unknown

Specifications
- Mass: 55–60 tons (estimated)
- Length: 25 m (82 ft) (estimated)
- Diameter: 2.1 m (6 ft 11 in) (estimated)
- Warhead: nuclear weapon, possibly MIRV
- Engine: three stage solid fuel rocket motor 100 tf (980 kN)
- Propellant: solid fuel
- Operational range: 15,000 km (9,300 mi)
- Flight altitude: 6,648 km (4,131 mi) (lofted trajectory)
- Launch platform: 9-axle transporter erector launcher

- Hwasong-18
- Hangul: 화성포-18형
- Hanja: 火星砲18型
- Lit.: Mars Artillery Type 18
- RR: Hwaseongpo-18hyeong
- MR: Hwasŏngp'o-18hyŏng

The Hwasong-18 (Note: Officially called Hwasongpho-18.) (Korean: 《화성포-18》형; lit. 'Mars Artillery Type 18') is a North Korean three-stage solid-fuelled intercontinental ballistic missile (ICBM). It is the first solid-fueled ICBM developed by North Korea, and was first unveiled at the 8 February 2023 parade commemorating the 75th anniversary of the founding of the Korean People's Army. Its maiden flight occurred on 13 April 2023.

== Description ==
Hwasong-18 is the first solid-fueled ICBM developed by North Korea. Released information and images indicate that Hwasong-18 is a three-stage, solid-fueled missile, cold-launched on an 9-axle transporter erector launcher. It is estimated to be 25 m (82 ft) long, 2.1 m (6 ft 11 in) wide, and has a body mass of about 55–60 tons. A solid-fueled missile, its launch is more difficult to preempt than previous liquid-fueled missiles, as it does not require hours of fueling and is easier to conceal since it does not require as many accompanying support vehicles. The missile is nuclear-capable and can accommodate multiple independently targetable reentry vehicle (MIRV).

Information from the 12 July 2023 test suggests that the Hwasong-18 can travel 15,000 km (9,300 mi) on an operational trajectory, enough to reach anywhere in the continental United States.

According to arms expert Jeffrey Lewis, the Hwasong-18's engine has a thrust of 100 tf (980 kN).

North Korean state media has called Hwasong-18 the "future core pivotal means" of their strategic force and the "most powerful, pivotal and principal means" in their defense. Hwasong-18 is also planned to be used along with the newer Hwasong-19 as North Korea's "primary core means in defending".

The first two stages of the Hwasong-18 serve as the basis for the Hwasong-16B intermediate-range ballistic missile (IRBM), which was first tested in April 2024, as well as an unnamed IRBM with maneuverable reentry vehicle (presumably Hwasong-16A), which was first tested in January 2024.

Information from German expert Norbert Brügge suggests that the Hwasong-18 can also be used as a satellite launch vehicle for launching small satellites into orbit.

== History ==
=== Early plans of solid-fueled ICBM ===
During a military parade in April 2017, North Korea displayed two types of missile canister. These canisters may indicate solid-fueled missile projects, including a solid-fueled ICBM.

North Korean leader Kim Jong Un first alluded to the development of a solid-fuel ICBM in January 2021 when it was included as part of a five-year arms development plan. A static ground test of a large solid-propellant rocket motor was conducted on 15 December 2022 which produced a thrust of 140 metric tons of force.

=== Revelation and test-fires of Hwasong-18 ===
Hwasong-18 was revealed during 8 February 2023 parade marking the 75th anniversary of the Korean People's Army. Four nine-axle mobile launchers carrying what appeared to be solid-fuel ICBM models, and the TV announcer only called these Hwasong-18 launchers as "Hwasong-class missiles" without mentioning official name. They were carried in canisters to fire the missiles by cold launch to eject them before first-stage ignition to protect the launcher from damage by the exhaust plume. These models were clearly of a different design than the previous large Pukguksong-5 solid-fueled SLBM.

The Hwasong-18's maiden flight test was carried out on 13 April 2023. The first stage followed a standard trajectory optimized for reaching maximum range, but the second and third stages pulled up into a highly-lofted trajectory; this unusual flight path caused Japan to issue a missile alarm, as during the first stage burn it appeared that the missile could overfly the country. North Korea test-fired Hwasong-18 for the second time on 12 July 2023 and became the longest flight time and highest apogee of any North Korean ICBM flight as of launch date (nearly 75 minutes and 6,648 km (4,131 mi) apogee).

After the 12 July 2023 test, North Korea displayed Hwasong-18 at a military parade on 27 July 2023. A third consecutive successful launch was occurred on 18 December 2023. The test and North Korea's characterization of it as the "launching drill of an ICBM unit" likely confirmed that the Hwasong-18 is operational.

=== Larger evolution ===
An evolution of Hwasong-18, Hwasong-19, was unveiled on 31 October 2024 with a flight test.

== List of tests ==
Attempt	Date	Location	Pre-launch announcement	Outcome	Additional notes	References
1	13 April 2023, 07:23 a.m. Pyongyang Standard Time	Jindallae Residence, Kangdong County, Pyongyang	None	Success	First test flight of the Hwasong-18. The missile flew in a lofted trajectory with an apogee of around 3,000 km (1,900 mi) and a flight distance of around 1,000 km (620 mi). According to North Korean state media, the launch has no negative impact with neighbor countries's security. Kim Jong Un supervised the launch along with his daughter, wife and sister.	
2	12 July 2023	Jindallae Residence, Kangdong County, Pyongyang	None	Success	Second test flight of the Hwasong-18. The missile flew for 74 minutes and 51 seconds with an apogee of 6,648 km (4,131 mi) and a flight distance of 1,001.2 km (622.1 mi). Kim Jong Un supervised the launch.	
3	18 December 2023, 08:24 a.m. Pyongyang Standard Time	Pyongyang	None	Success	Third test flight of Hwasong-18, with the missile flying for 73 minutes, achieving 6,518.2 km (4,050.2 mi) apogee and covering 1,002.3 km (622.8 mi) ground track. The Korean Central News Agency stated that the launch was to review the readiness of the North Korea's nuclear war deterrence against a potential United States adversary. It occurred not long after another missile launch that took place on the previous day. Kim Jong Un oversaw the launch along with his daughter.	

== In popular culture ==
In September 2023, the Hwasong-18, along with Hwasong-17 and Hwasal-2, was reported to be featured in patriotic desks for wearing.

In December 2023, North Korea introduced a propaganda poster featuring Hwasong-18, along with Hwasong-17, the Malligyong-1 reconnaissance satellite and mockup of a solid-fuel missile canister that was displayed during the April 2017 military parade.

On 27 July 2024, the Korea Stamp Corporation unveiled postage stamps featuring Hwasong-18.

== See also ==
- DF-41 – (China)
- Hwasong-19 – (North Korea)
- LGM-30 Minuteman – (United States)
- RS-24 Yars – (Russia)
- RT-2PM2 Topol-M – (Russia)
