= Hwasong-19 =

North Korean mobile intercontinental ballistic missile

- Type: Intercontinental ballistic missile
- Place of origin: North Korea

Service history
- In service: 2024–present
- Used by: Korean People's Army Strategic Force; DPRK Missile Administration

Production history
- Manufacturer: North Korea

Specifications
- Mass: At least 80,000 kg (180,000 lb)
- Length: At least 28 m (92 ft)
- Warhead: Nuclear warhead MIRV-capable
- Propellant: solid-fueled (all three stages)
- Operational range: At least 15,000 km (9,300 mi)
- Launch platform: 11-axle transporter erector launcher (TEL)

The Hwasong-19 (Note: Officially called Hwasongpho-19.) (Korean: 《화성포-19》형; lit. 'Mars Artillery Type 19') is a North Korean solid-fueled intercontinental ballistic missile (ICBM). First tested on 31 October 2024, Hwasong-19 is an evolution of the North Korean family of solid-fueled ICBM with a longer range and a heavier payload. It is claimed by North Korean state media as the world's strongest missile.

== Description ==
Images of the Hwasong-19
- Maiden flight
- At the "Defence Development-2024" military exhibition

The Hwasong-19 is a three-stage, solid-fueled missile, cold-launched on an 11-axle transporter erector launcher. It appears to be larger than its predecessor, as the missile uses a 11-axle TEL utilizing a unified hull-cover design. The canister cover is hinged at the bottom and fixed to the hull; while the cover open, it does not fall to the ground and remains connected to the TEL. This design may have been intended to save resources or to serve combat purposes, as well as to camouflage the mobile launcher as not launched to deceive the opponent. Its body is longer and wider than the Hwasong-18, allowing the missile to have more propellant than its predecessor, causing its flight time and apogee to increase by 13 minutes and 1,100 km (680 mi), respectively during its first flight test. Its long range, which is estimated to be at least 15,000 km (9,300 mi), allows it to reach targets anywhere in the contiguous United States. Also, due to its increased diameter and heavier payload, Hwasong-19 can accommodate MIRVs made in the 1960s. The estimated payload capacity remains unknown, but it is possible that the missile may carry four or five reentry vehicles.

The Hwasong-19's length and launch mass is estimated to be at least 28 m (92 ft) and 80,000 kg (180,000 lb), respectively, with the former being longer than Hwasong-18 and Russia's mobile ICBMs. However, its large size could limit its deployment area and mobility, making it vulnerable to detection by US and South Korean intelligence before it can be fired and making it a priority target for enemy's preemptive strikes.

North Korea planned to use Hwasong-19 along with Hwasong-18 as its "primary core means in defending". It is possible that Hwasong-19 is intended to replace the liquid-fueled Hwasong-17. The missile is also claimed to be "an ICBM of ultimate version", "perfected" and the world's strongest missile. as well as the world's largest operational road-mobile ICBM.

According to the South Korean military, Hwasong-19 may be a result of a military cooperation between North Korea and Russia.

=== Modified version ===
According to information released by North Korean state media in September 2025, Hwasong-19 will have a modified version, using a new solid-fueled engine that produces a thrust of 1,960–1,971 kN (199.9–201.0 tf). This engine, which underwent eight static firing tests between 2023 and 2 September 2025, is also planned to be used by the newer, untested Hwasong-20. It has about 40 percent more thrust than the Hwasong-18. Analysts allege it can be modified for reconnaissance satellite launches.

== History ==
During a Kim Jong Un's visit in September 2024, North Korea revealed a 12-axle transporter erector launcher (TEL). This suggests the development of a new ICBM larger than previous missiles.

Hwasong-19 made its public debut on 31 October 2024, with a flight test. North Korea officially confirmed the launch on the same day of the launch. Initially, North Korea did not reveal the missile's official name; it was revealed a day after the test-fire.

North Korea displayed Hwasong-19 at the "Defence Development-2024" military exhibition, held in late-November 2024.

== List of tests ==
There has been one known test so far:

Attempt	Date	Location	Pre-launch detection	Outcome	Additional notes	References
1	31 October 2024, 7:11 a.m. Pyongyang Standard Time	Around Pyongyang	South Korea detected preparation before the launch, with the setup of mobile launcher and the possibility of a warhead re-entry testing.	Success	Japanese data shows the ICBM flew for 86 minutes with about 1,000 km (620 mi) range and over 7,000 km (4,300 mi) apogee, landing 200 km (120 mi) west of Okushiri Island, Hokkaido, Japan. According to North Korea, the missile flew for 85 minutes and 56 seconds with 1,001.2 km (622.1 mi) range and 7,687.5 km (4,776.8 mi) apogee. The first test of Hwasong-19 broke the apogee and flight time record for a North Korean missile test (as of November 2024). Kim Jong Un and his daughter oversaw the test.	

== See also ==
- DF-41 – (China)
- LGM-30 Minuteman – (United States)
- RS-24 Yars – (Russia)
- RT-2PM2 Topol-M – (Russia)
