= Kwail Airport =

- IATA: none; ICAO: none

Summary
- Airport type: Military
- Serves: Kwail, North Korea
- Elevation AMSL: 39 ft / 12 m
- Coordinates: 38°25′31.90″N 125°01′09.20″E

Map

Runways
| Direction | Length | | Surface |
| Direction | ft | m | Surface |
|---|---|---|---|
| 15/33 | 8,150 | 2,484 | Concrete |

Kwail Airport(과일비행장) is an airport in Kwail, Hwanghae-namdo, North Korea.

== Facilities ==
The airfield has a single concrete runway 15/33 measuring 8150 x 148 feet (2484 x 45 m). It has a full-length parallel taxiway with aprons on each end, as well as a taxiway extending 1.7 km to the south to dispersed or underground aircraft shelters. It is home to a fighter regiment of 44 MiG-21 jets.
