= Hwasong-11D =

North Korean short-range ballistic missile

- Type: Short-range ballistic missile Tactical ballistic missile
- Place of origin: North Korea

Service history
- In service: 2022–present
- Used by: Korean People's Army Strategic Force; DPRK Missile Administration

Production history
- Designed: 2022
- Manufacturer: North Korea
- Developed from: Hwasong-11A
- No. built: Over 250 launchers

Specifications
- Mass: 3,000 kg (6,600 lb)
- Length: 5.5 m (18 ft)
- Diameter: 0.76 m (2 ft 6 in)
- Warhead: 500–700 kg (1,100–1,500 lb); Hwasan-31
- Engine: Solid-propelled engine
- Operational range: 100–300 km (62–186 mi)
- Flight altitude: 50 km (31 mi)
- Guidance system: Inertial navigation combined with satellite data; "Autonomous navigation system"
- Launch platform: 3-axle TEL

The Hwasong-11D (Note: For other names, see § Naming.) (Korean: 《화성포-11라》형; lit. 'Mars Artillery Type 11D') is a North Korean single-stage, solid-fueled tactical ballistic missile. It was first observed in April 2022 during a flight test. A smaller variant of Hwasong-11A, it has a smaller size and a shorter range compared to its baseline version, suggesting it may be optimized for tactical missions. Hwasong-11D is known to have entered mass production and deliveries to North Korean army.

== Description ==
Images of the Hwasong-11D
- 3-axle TEL
- April 2026 test

=== Missile ===
Hwasong-11D is the smaller variant of Hwasong-11A, designed to be capable of striking shorter range targets and cost-effective. It is estimated to be 5.5 m (18 ft) long, 0.76 m (2 ft 6 in) wide and has a launch mass of nearly 3,000 kg (6,600 lb). While Hwasong-11D is claimed to be the smallest short-range ballistic missile of North Korea, its range, which is estimated to be 100–300 km (62–186 mi) based on test results, led the missile to be classified as a close-range ballistic missile (CRBM). According to United Nations Security Council member nations, the Hwasong-11D also has an underwater-based version, a submarine-launched ballistic missile first tested on 19 October 2021, later known as Hwasong-11S. Along with Hwasong-11B, it appears to be based on United States's ATACMS, with the North Korean missile having newer technology, longer range and more accuracy.

It is assessed that Hwasong-11D could be a counterpart to the South Korean's KTSSM, especially the role. The launches were accompanied with a statement, associating them with the development of tactical nuclear weapons, as well as the improvement of frontline long-range artillery units's firepower. Hwasong-11D follows a near-ballistic trajectory, with approximately 50 km (31 mi) apogee. This low apogee, combined with its short flight time and terminal maneuverability, makes it difficult for traditional missile defense systems to detect and intercept. Moreover, the missile's improved accuracy reduces the number of missiles required to attack the target. Also, Hwasong-11D can have better survivability against missile defenses if the missile is equipped with smaller and lighter tactical nuclear warheads while retaining the Hwasong-11A's maneuverability, thus allowing it to threaten shorter range targets.

Hwasong-11D is known to be guidanced by an inertial navigation system with correction from satellite data. In May 2024, it was tested with an unspecified "autonomous navigation system".

Hwasong-11D is claimed to be capable of carrying a 500–700 kg (1,100–1,500 lb) payload, likely conventional, fragmentation, submunition, or chemical. It can also be armed with the Hwasan-31 tactical nuclear warhead.

According to German analyst Norbert Brügge, Hwasong-11D is a derivative from KN-25 and Hwasong-11/OTR-21 Tochka. He evaluates the missile to be a type of multiple rocket launcher, despite North Korean official claim of tactical ballistic missile.

=== Launcher ===
==== Basic type ====
According to North Korea, the Hwasong-11D missile system, including the launcher, was personally designed by Kim Jong Un as a "new pivotal attack weapon" of North Korean forces. The basic-type TEL is a 3-axle truck, estimated to be 8.5 m (28 ft) long and 3 m (9.8 ft) wide. Each basic-type launcher can deploy up to four Hwasong-11D missiles.

==== Modular type ====
During a military exhibition opened on 4 October 2025, North Korea unveiled a modular three-axle launcher of Hwasong-11D. Believed to be inspired in design from United States's HIMARS, it has two modules, each of which can carry a single Hwasong-11D missile or multiple launch rockets of 122 mm and 240 mm diameters. This system is tentatively named Juche-HIMARS by analysts. However, it is unlikely that the Hwasong-11D missiles carried by the modular-type launcher are nuclear-armed.

==== Possible air-borne launcher ====
Assuming a weight of 1,500 kg (3,300 lb), it is possible that Hwasong-11D can be carried by Korean People's Army Air Force's Harbin H-5/Ilyushin Il-28 after necessary modifications.

=== Naming ===
North Korean state media began referring to Hwasong-11D as Hwasongpho-11 Ra (《화성포-11라》형) from April 2026, although the official designation was revealed through photo evidence in March 2023, during its coverage on the Hwasan-31 tactical nuclear warhead. The official designation can also be romanized as Hwasong-11La, Hwasong-11Ra or Hwasongpho-11D. However, in its earlier launches, occurred between 2022 and 2024, the Hwasong-11D was called "tactical guided weapon" and later, "tactical ballistic missile", instead of its formal name.

In April 2025, it was revealed that Hwasong-11D had been designated KN-35 by the US military under its naming convention.

== History ==
Hwasong-11D made its public debut on 16 April 2022 with a flight test. In this test, North Korea referred to Hwasong-11D as a "new-type tactical guided weapon". Nine days later, on 25 April 2022, North Korea displayed Hwasong-11D during a military parade.

Further test-fires of Hwasong-11D occurred on 2 November 2022 and on 9 March 2023. Between these test-fires, North Korea displayed Hwasong-11D during a military parade on 8 February 2023.

It was reported at the third test launch of Hwasong-11D that the missile had already received an undisclosed official designation. In late-March 2023, the official name of Hwasong-11D was confirmed in the Korean Central News Agency's report on the new Hwasan-31 nuclear warhead, although a partial and blurred name was only displayed.

Hwasong-11D made two further appearances in 2024: a test flight occurred on 17 May and a ceremony of transferring 250 launchers to frontline military units on 4 August. According to the International Institute for Strategic Studies (IISS), as of 2026, North Korea is possessing 250 Hwasong-11D launchers.

A further test of Hwasong-11D occurred on 19 April 2026. This time, the Korean Central News Agency mentioned Hwasong-11D directly for the first time, and images also showed the area impacted by warheads, unlike an earlier launch of the submunition-armed Hwasong-11A in early April. Additional tests of Hwasong-11D occurred in May, June and October 2026 involving "special mission" and cluster warheads.

== List of tests ==
According to the International Institute for Strategic Studies, between 2022 and 2024, North Korea conducted at least nine test launches of Hwasong-11D.

=== Confirmed tests ===
Attempt	Date (Pyongyang Standard Time)	Location	Number of missiles tested	Outcome	Additional notes	References
1	16 April 2022	Chakto-dong, Hungnam, Hamhung, South Hamgyong Province	2	Success	South Korea detected the launch around 2 p.m., with the missiles being fired with a 21-minute interval between launches. It flew for 60 seconds and achieved 25 km (16 mi) apogee, 110 km (68 mi) range and a maximum speed of Mach 4 (4,900 km/h; 3,000 mph). Kim Jong Un oversaw the launch.	
2	2 November 2022	Chongju, North Pyongan Province	2	Success	On 7 November 2022, North Korea released photos of missile launches from 2 to 5 November, including images of a Hwasong-11D test-fire occurred on 2 November 2022. However, a photo from the April 2022 test was reused to refer to the November test.	
3	9 March 2023	Taesong Lake, South Pyongan Province	6	Success	Images from North Korean state media showed the launch of six Hwasong-11D missiles, occurred during a fire assault drill conducted by the Hwasong artillery unit. These missiles hit a sea target, but the flight distance and altitude were unknown. Kim Jong Un attended the launch with his daughter.	
4	17 May 2024	Wonsan	1 (North Korea) "Several" (South Korea)	Success	Kim Jong Un supervised the launch. According to North Korean state media, the missile employed a new autonomous navigation system. South Korean's Joint Chiefs of Staff detected the launch of several Hwasong-11D missiles, at 3:10 p.m. (local time). These missiles flew 300 km (190 mi) before landing in waters between South Korea and Japan.	
5	19 April 2026	Sinpo, South Hamgyong Province	5	Success	South Korean military detected the launch of multiple ballistic missiles near Sinpo at 6:10 a.m. local time, and North Korean statement indicated the launch involved five upgraded Hwasong-11D missiles that travelled 136 km (85 mi). These missiles, equipped with cluster and fragmentation mine warheads, hit a target area of 12.5–13 ha (31–32 acres) with "very high density". Kim Jong Un oversaw the test with his daughter and senior military officials.	
6	26 May 2026	Chongju, North Pyongan Province	1	Success	The Hwasong-11D missile, equipped with a "special mission" warhead, was launched along with 240 mm multiple launch rockets and tactical cruise missiles. It was fired from a lightweight, modular TEL first unveiled in October 2025. Kim Jong Un attended the test.	
7	25 June 2026	Ragwon County, South Hamgyong Province	At least 2	Success	A Kim Jong Un-supervised launch that South Korean military delayed in alerting, despite real-time tracking. Like the May 2026 test, it was also to test the "special mission" warhead that can be used to attack facilities in South Korea, including airfields, ports and power stations. Images show two launchers fired the missiles southward, striking an island target located near a private mansion of Kim Jong Un.	
8	31 October 2026	Chongju, North Pyongan Province	At least 1	Success	Test of tactical ballistic missile's Standard Type 2 cluster bomb warhead, which is claimed to be capable of "turning into ashes" targets within an area of 12–13 ha (30–32 acres) with highest-density power. No information was released about the missile but it was identified as Hwasong-11D based on North Korean imagery. This is the second known test of submunition-armed Hwasong-11D.	

=== Alleged tests ===
North Korea fired eight ballistic missiles from at least four different locations on 5 June 2022, two of which might be Hwasong-11D as they flew at an extremely low altitude and travelled to a short distance.

Another alleged test of Hwasong-11D occurred in March 2025, in which multiple missiles were apparently launched toward Yellow Sea on the 10th.

== Operational use ==
=== Mass production of launchers ===
According to NK News, a factory in Pyongsong is one of the facilities assembling Hwasong-11D launchers, with the production activities of TELs starting from at least November 2023.

A total number of at least 154 Hwasong-11D launchers were spotted by North Korean state media in the two reports published in January and May 2024. The first one, published on 10 January 2024, showed at least 45 Hwasong-11D TELs during Kim Jong Un's inspection to unnamed missile launcher factories on 8 and 9 January 2024. According to the report, the factories have "deployed new weapon types and equipment to the first-line large combined units and major missile units", suggesting Hwasong-11D is operational. Four months later, images from a similar state media report indicated around 99 Hwasong-11D launchers being inspected by Kim Jong Un during a visit to another unnamed factory on 14 May 2024.

=== Deployment ===
Given its short range and low altitude recorded during testing, if Hwasong-11D become deployed, these missiles will target South Korea.

In 2023, North Korea replaced Hwasong-6 (Scud-C) operation with the deployment of Hwasong-11D at the Majang-ri missile base, according to Decker Eveleth's analysis for NK News in August 2024.

North Korea held a ceremony to send 250 Hwasong-11D launchers to the frontline military units at the Inter-Korean border on 4 August 2024. The ceremony took place in Pyongyang and was attended by Kim Jong Un.

== See also ==
- Hwasong-11B
- KTSSM
- ATACMS
