= Jonathan McDowell =

British astronomer (born 1960)

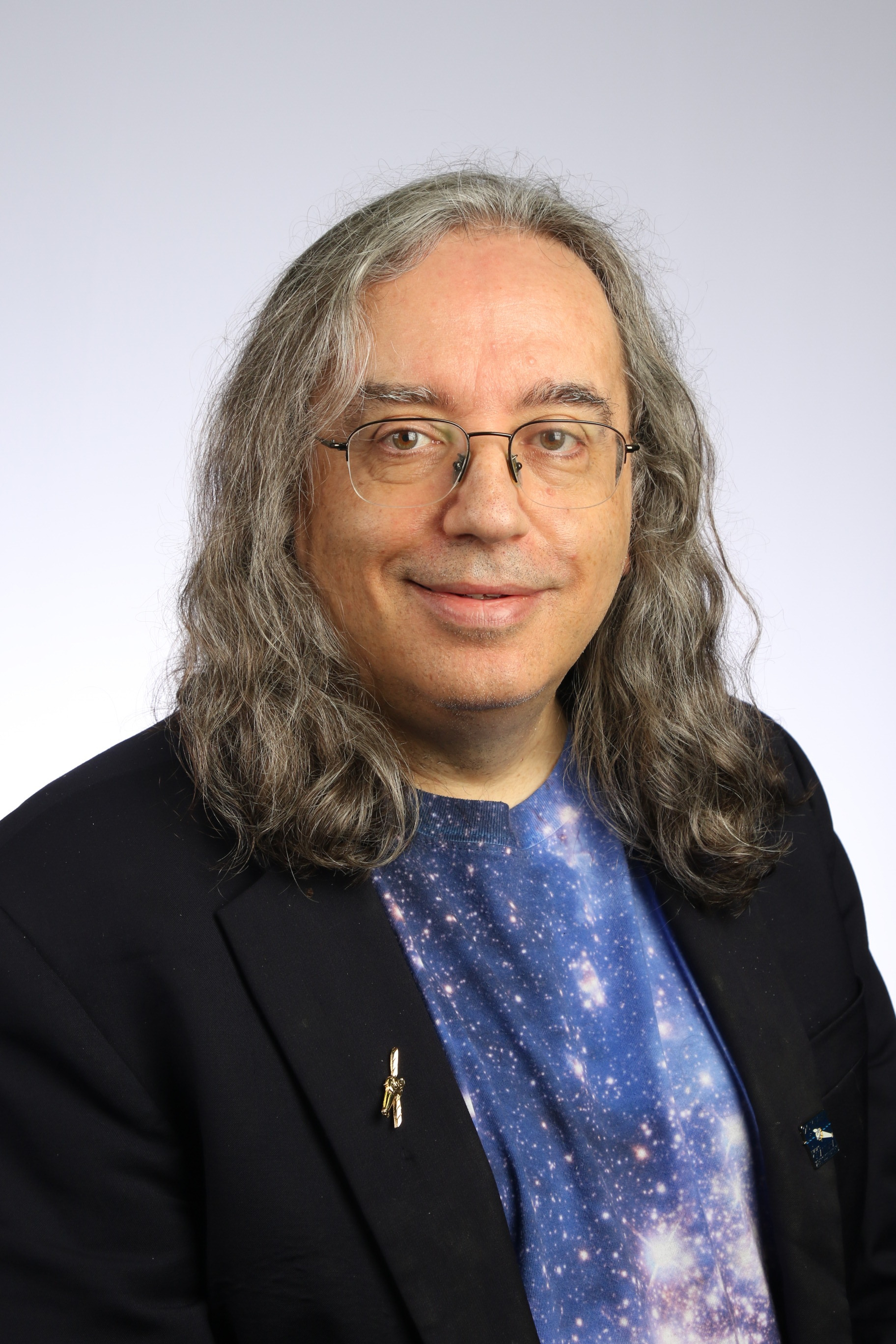
- McDowell in 2020
- Born: 6 July 1960 (age 66)
- Education: University of Cambridge (BA, PhD)
- Scientific career
- Workplaces: Harvard–Smithsonian Center for Astrophysics (1988-2026)

Jonathan Christopher McDowell (born 6 July 1960) is a British-American astronomer and astrophysicist who worked at the Harvard–Smithsonian Center for Astrophysics's Chandra X-ray Center. McDowell is the author and editor of Jonathan's Space Report, an e-mail-distributed newsletter documenting satellite launches.

== Education and career ==
McDowell has a BA in Mathematics (1981) from Churchill College and a PhD in Astrophysics (1986) from the Institute of Astronomy, both at the University of Cambridge, England. After high school, McDowell worked for six months at the Royal Observatory, Greenwich and held a summer job at the Royal Observatory, Edinburgh before he began his PhD studies. His first post-doctoral position was at Jodrell Bank Observatory followed by another at the Center for Astrophysics | Harvard & Smithsonian in Cambridge, Massachusetts. McDowell then moved to Huntsville, Alabama, where he spent a year at NASA's Marshall Space Flight Center. In 1992, McDowell returned to Cambridge, Massachusetts, and worked there as a staff member at the Chandra X-ray Observatory until his retirement as of May 2026 and lives near London.

== Research interests ==
McDowell's main research interests include:

- the cosmological microwave background
- the X-ray emission from the merging galaxy Arp 220
- the nature of the broad emission line region in quasars
- the broad-band spectral energy distribution in quasars
- studying nearby galaxies with the Chandra X-ray Observatory

In software, McDowell helped design the CIAO data analysis package and the software infrastructure for the Chandra X-ray Observatory data processing pipelines. More recently, McDowell led the creation of an exhibit of astronomical images at the Smithsonian. He is co-director of an undergraduate summer research program whose alumni include Alicia M. Soderberg and Planet Hunters scientist Megan Schwamb.

== Jonathan's Space Report ==
In his free time, McDowell conducts research into the history of spaceflight, and since 1989 has written and edited Jonathan's Space Report, a free internet newsletter documenting technical details on satellite launches. This information, obtained from original sources including declassified Department of Defense documents and Russian-language publications, can also be found on McDowell's web site.

In 1994, McDowell published a history of the North American X-15 spaceplane, in which he suggested that 80 kilometres (50 mi) should be adopted as the boundary of space. In the mesosphere, 80 km is nearly equal to 50 mi, the altitude used by the United States to confer astronaut status on pilots, as in the X-15 program itself. It also differs from the internationally accepted Kármán line altitude of 100 km, used by the Fédération Aéronautique Internationale for the same purpose. In 2018, McDowell published a refereed journal paper in Acta Astronautica making detailed physical arguments for the 80 km value.

== Media ==
In 2017, McDowell weighed in on footage released by the Department of Defense showing a UFO on the website Inverse, though stating he had not reviewed the case in question:

Typically, the explanation is that the thing they are looking at is much closer or much farther than they thought, or is a reflection of some kind,

From 1993 to 2010, McDowell wrote a monthly column for Sky & Telescope. In addition, McDowell has been interviewed on numerous television and radio programs with regard to rocket launches or other celestial phenomena that generated interest amongst the general public.

== Honours ==
He was elected a Legacy Fellow of the American Astronomical Society in 2020.

The main-belt asteroid 4589 McDowell was named after him in 1993.
