= Maneuverable reentry vehicle =

Ballistic missile whose warhead is capable of changing trajectory

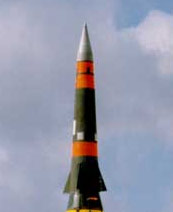
Pershing II upper stage containing MARV with terminal active radar guidance

The maneuverable reentry vehicle (abbreviated MARV or MaRV) is a type of warhead for ballistic missiles that is capable of maneuvering and changing its trajectory.

There are two general reasons to use MARV. One is to make it more difficult to track the re-entry vehicle (RV) and thereby make it more difficult to attack as it approaches its target. This was particularly useful against early anti-ballistic missile (ABM) systems which took seconds to calculate an interception course. Making random trajectory changes could render these systems useless. This class of MARV is sometimes known as evading MaRVs.

The other is to improve accuracy or track moving targets using terminal guidance systems that can act only during the last stages of the flight. This class is sometimes known as accuracy MaRVs. In this case, it is the short range of the active guidance system that demands the RV be able to maneuver, as is the base in the Pershing II active radar homing system. The same systems may also be used to track moving targets like aircraft carriers, which move far enough between launch and approach that there is no way to predict their location and active terminal guidance must be used.

== History ==
=== Early work ===
The development of the Soviet A-35 anti-ballistic missile system (ABM) system led to work in the United States to consider ways to defeat it. The tri-service Advanced Strategic Missile Systems office was formed to study the problem, and several possibilities were immediately evident.

One was to use skip-glide reentry to extend the range of the reentry vehicle (RV) while flying at lower altitude, which would make it much more difficult to track at the long distances needed for a successful interception. A similar approach was to use air-launched ballistic missiles, which flew much shorter distances and much lower altitudes. Another was to add various decoys and radar countermeasures to make the ABM systems fail to track the RV among the decoys, or in a similar way, to use MIRV systems to increase the number of targets beyond what the ABM system might handle.

Maneuvering RVs are another solution to the problem. The radars, and especially computers, of the era took many seconds to calculate the trajectory of the descending RV, the trajectory of the ascending ABM, the chosen collision point, and to send that information to the ABM to adjust its flight path. If the RV maneuvered continually during the time it was within range of the ABM, the guidance system would never calculate a successful interception course. The only solution would be to launch multiple ABMs in a pattern that covered all of the possible approaches to the target, which could require dozens of ABMs per attacking RV.

Work on MARV was carried out continually through the 1960s, but ultimately not put into use on the US ICBM fleet as the signing of the ABM Treaty mooted the need for anything more advanced than MIRV and decoys.

=== Mk. 500 ===
Interest in evading MARV grew in the late 1970s as part of the wider debate on nuclear warfighting policy. This led the US Navy to develop a simple MARV for their Trident I SLBM, the Mk. 500, or "Evader". This was a simple modification to the existing RV, which "bent" the nose of the RV slightly to the side. This created aerodynamic lift in a single direction, but the RV's overall direction could be controlled by rolling the RV around its long axis. During the terminal approach, the Mk. 500 would continually roll in different directions to create a random path.

Mk. 500 was designed to be simple, and had a number of known problems. One was that it could not fly a straight path and that meant it had to calculate an approach where all of its maneuvers brought it to its target. Another was that the maneuvers were constant gee, so as it approached the target the area in which it might move continually shrunk. Finally, as it was constantly generating lift, it was slowing more rapidly than a non-maneuvering RV. This not only reduced the amount of lift it generated as it slowed, it also greatly reduced its terminal speed, both of which opened it to attack by very fast interceptors attacking at very short range.

=== Sandia Winged Energetic Reentry Vehicle Experiment (SWERVE) ===
SWERVE started in the 1970s and culminated with a successful flight test in 1985, which demonstrated a sophisticated maneuvering reentry vehicle technology and paved the way for the Advanced Hypersonic Weapon program's Alternate Re-Entry System in the early 2010s, which was later developed into the Common-Hypersonic Glide Body hypersonic glide vehicle.

=== Advanced Maneuverable Reentry Vehicle ===
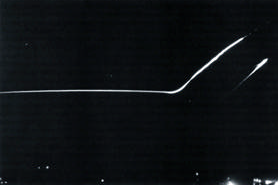
Flight test of the Advanced Maneuverable Reentry Vehicle in early 1980. The path of the reentry vehicle is the upper streak of light, with the booster tanks immediately below. Lights from the Kwajalein Atoll in the Pacific can be seen in the lower right corner.

The Advanced Maneuverable Reentry Vehicle (AMaRV) was a prototype MARV built by McDonnell Douglas. Four AMaRVs were made and represented a significant leap in reentry vehicle sophistication. Three of the AMaRVs were launched by Minuteman-1 ICBMs on 20 December 1979, 8 October 1980 and 4 October 1981. AMaRV had an entry mass of approximately 470 kg, a nose radius of 2.34 cm, a forward frustum half-angle of 10.4°, an inter-frustum radius of 14.6 cm, aft frustum half angle of 6°, and an axial length of 2.079 meters.

The design was essentially a conical RV with a slice cut off one side to form a flat surface. A small triangular prism was placed at the aft end of this flat area. The prism was split into two halves, left and right, to form two flaps, sometimes referred to as a "split-windward flap". To pitch the vehicle, the flaps were both raised into the airstream and caused the nose to move in the opposite direction and thereby produce lift opposite to the direction of flap movement. The RV was rotated by raising one flap while lowering the other.

AMaRV had numerous advantages over Mk. 500. It did not have to maneuver at all times, and had fine control over the maneuvers it performed. As it could avoid maneuvers during the initial reentry, it would retain energy and thus be able to maintain powerful maneuvers at lower altitudes, while also travelling faster overall. It was "difficult to conceive of an endoatmospheric ABM which could defend against AMaRV-type vehicles at reasonable cost."

The disadvantage of AMaRV was that it was very heavy, too heavy to be carried on Trident I. While it could be carried on Minuteman and MX, doing so would limit the number of RVs carried, which might result in fewer RVs reaching their targets even if they did evade ABMs that non-maneuvering RVs did not.

== MARV-capable missiles ==
China

- DF-15B (active)
- DF-21D (active)

France

- B-Strike Missile Balistique Terrestre (MBT)– 1,000–2,500 kilometres (620–1,550 mi)

India

- Agni-P (planned, has not been tested with a MaRV)
- Agni-II

Iran

- Emad (active)
- Kheibar Shekan (active)
- Haj Qassem (active)
- Fattah-1 (active)
- Qassem Bassir (active)

North Korea

- KN-18 (tested, status unknown)
- Hwasong-12A (presumed name, tested)
- Hwasong-16A (presumed name, tested)

Pakistan

- Shaheen-II (active)
- Ghaznavi (active)

South Korea

- Hyunmoo-2C (active)

Soviet Union

- R-27K (retired)

United States

- Pershing II (retired)

== See also ==
- Avangard (hypersonic glide vehicle)
- Boost-glide
