= 18th Wing =

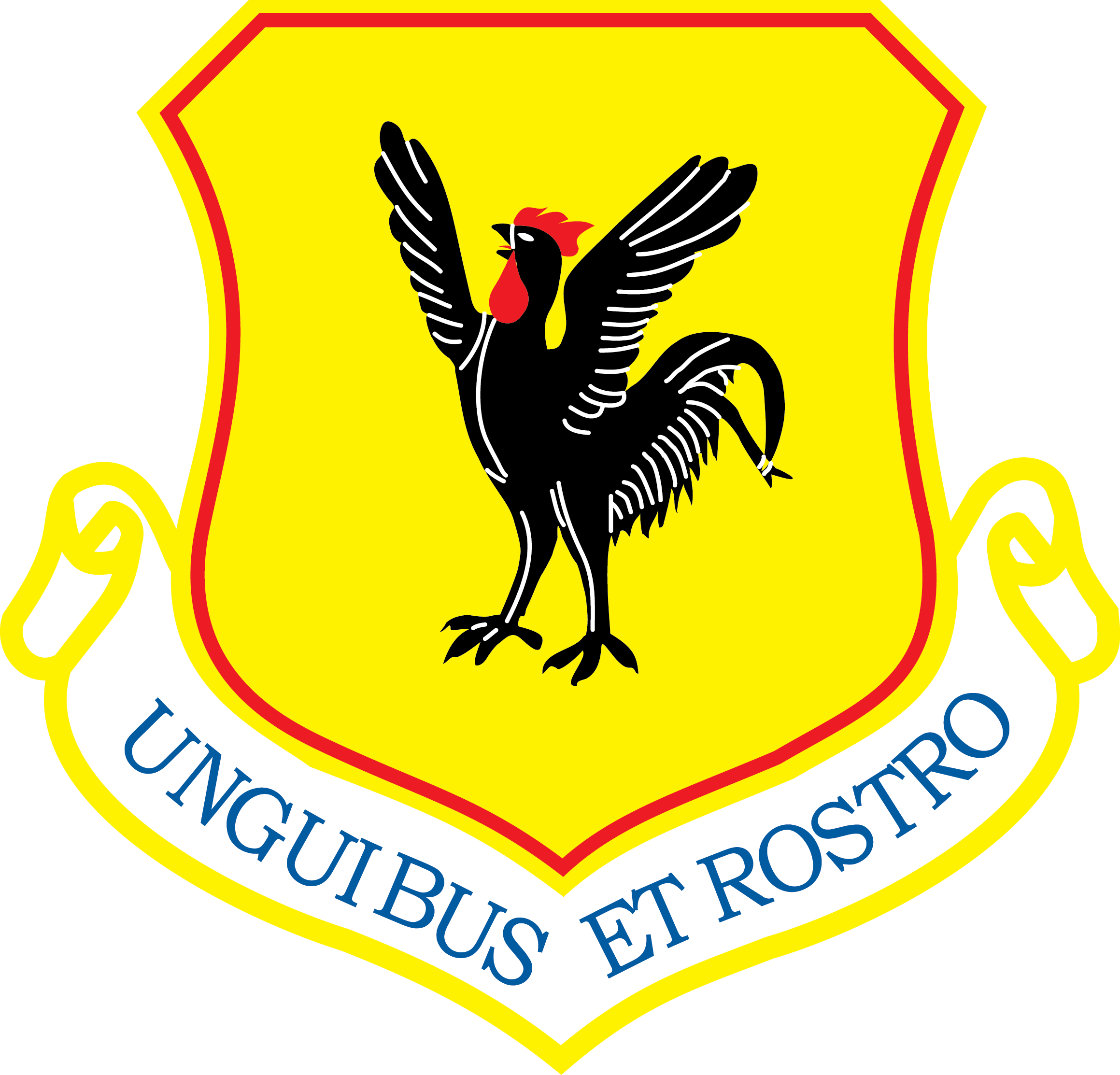
- 18th Wing emblem
- Active: August 1948–present
- Country: United States
- Branch: United States Air Force
- Role: Fighter / Command & Control / Airlift / Search and rescue
- Part of: Fifth Air Force; Pacific Air Forces
- Garrison/HQ: Kadena Air Base
- Mottos: Unguibus Et Rostro (Latin for 'With Talons and Beak')
- Engagements: Korean War
- Decorations: Air Force Outstanding Unit Award; Republic of Korea Presidential Unit Citation; Republic of Vietnam Gallantry Cross with Palm

Commanders
- Current commander: Brig Gen John B. Gallemore
- Notable commanders: Robert L. Rutherford; Patrick K. Gamble; Richard E. Hawley; William T. Hobbins; Lauris Norstad; George B. Simler; Robert F. Titus; Bud Anderson

The United States Air Force's 18th Wing is the host wing for Kadena Air Base, Okinawa, Japan and is the Air Force's largest combat wing. It is the largest and principal organization in the Pacific Air Forces Fifth Air Force.

The Wing's 18th Operations Group is a successor organization of the 18th Pursuit Group, one of the 15 original combat air groups formed by the Army before World War II.

== Mission ==
The 18th Wing's mission is to defend U.S. and Japanese' mutual interests by providing a responsive staging and operational airbase with integrated, deployable, forward-based airpower. The focus of the unit's operations is directed to accomplishing this mission. Strategy used to employ this mission centers around a composite force of combat-ready fighter, air refueling, airborne warning and control and rescue aircraft as well as medical aircrews tasked with transporting patients by air.

== Units ==
The 18th Wing is composed of five groups each with specific functions. The Operations Group controls all flying and airfield operations. The Maintenance Group performs Aircraft and Aircraft support equipment maintenance. The Mission Support Group has a wide range of responsibilities but a few of its functions are Security, Communications, Personnel Management, Logistics, Services and Contracting support. The Civil Engineer Group provides facilities management, while the Medical Group provides medical and dental care.

- 18th Operations Group (Tail Code: ZZ)
  - 18th Aeromedical Evacuation Squadron (Medical Aircrews)
  - 31st Rescue Squadron (Pararescue)
  - 33d Rescue Squadron (HH-60W Jolly Green II)
  - 44th Fighter Squadron "Vampire Bats"
  - 67th Fighter Squadron "Fighting Cocks" (F-15EX)
  - 623d Air Control Squadron "Lightsword" (JADGE)
  - 909th Air Refueling Squadron "Young Tigers" (KC-135R)
  - 961st Airborne Air Control Squadron "Ronin/Cowboy" (E-3G)
- 18th Mission Support Group
  - 18th Contracting Squadron
  - 18th Communications Squadron
  - 18th Force Support Squadron
    - 18th Force Support Squadron Detachment 2 @ Bellows AFS
  - 18th Logistics Readiness Squadron
  - 18th Security Forces Squadron
- 18th Maintenance Group
  - 18th Aircraft Maintenance Squadron
  - 18th Component Maintenance Squadron
  - 18th Equipment Maintenance Squadron
  - 18th Munitions Squadron
  - 718th Aircraft Maintenance Squadron
- 18th Medical Group
  - 18th Aerospace Medicine Squadron
  - 18th Dental Squadron
  - 18th Medical Operations Squadron
  - 18th Medical Support Squadron
- 18th Civil Engineer Group
  - 18th Civil Engineer Squadron
  - 718th Civil Engineer Squadron

Team Kadena includes associate units from five other Air Force major commands, the Navy, and numerous other Department of Defense agencies and direct reporting units. In addition to the aircraft of the 18th Wing, associate units operate more than 20 permanently assigned, forward-based or deployed aircraft from the base on a daily basis.

== Heraldry ==
The fighting cock emblem, approved in 1931, symbolizes the courage and aggressiveness of a combat organization.

== History ==
The 18th Fighter Wing was established on 10 August 1948, and activated four days later at Clark Air Force Base. On 20 January 1950, the wing was re-designated the 18th Fighter-Bomber Wing.

=== Korean War ===
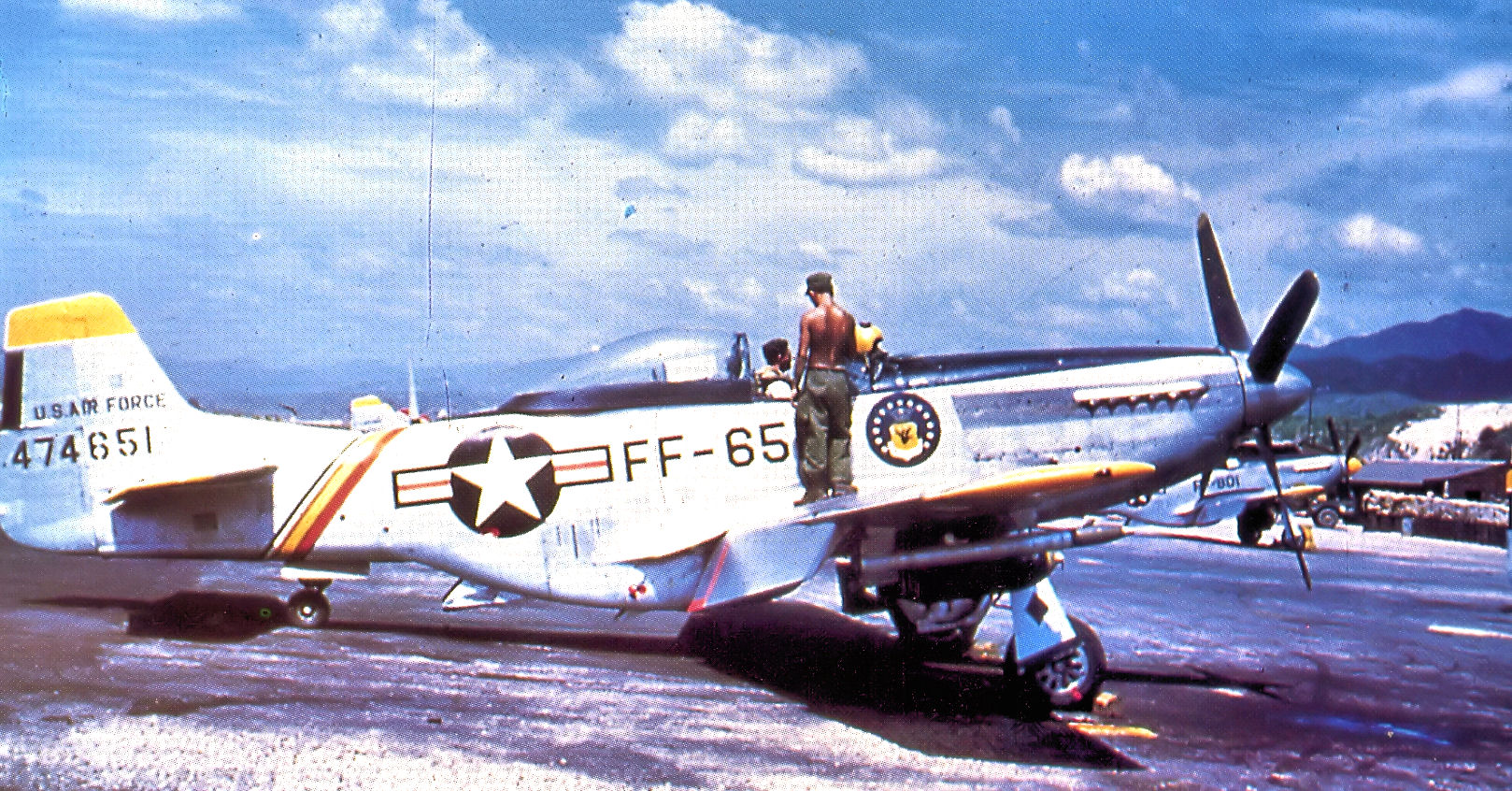
North American F-51D-30-NA Mustang, AF Ser. No. 44-74651, cira 1950. This aircraft was deployed to South Korea and is marked as the Wing Commander's.

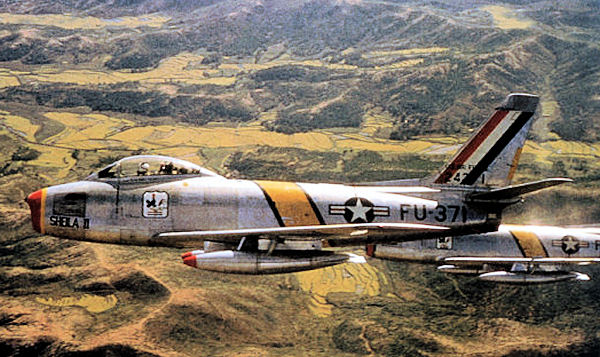
North American F-86F-25-NH Sabre, AF Ser. No. 52-5371, of the 18th Fighter-Bomber Group, 1953. Aircraft marked as Wing Commander's.

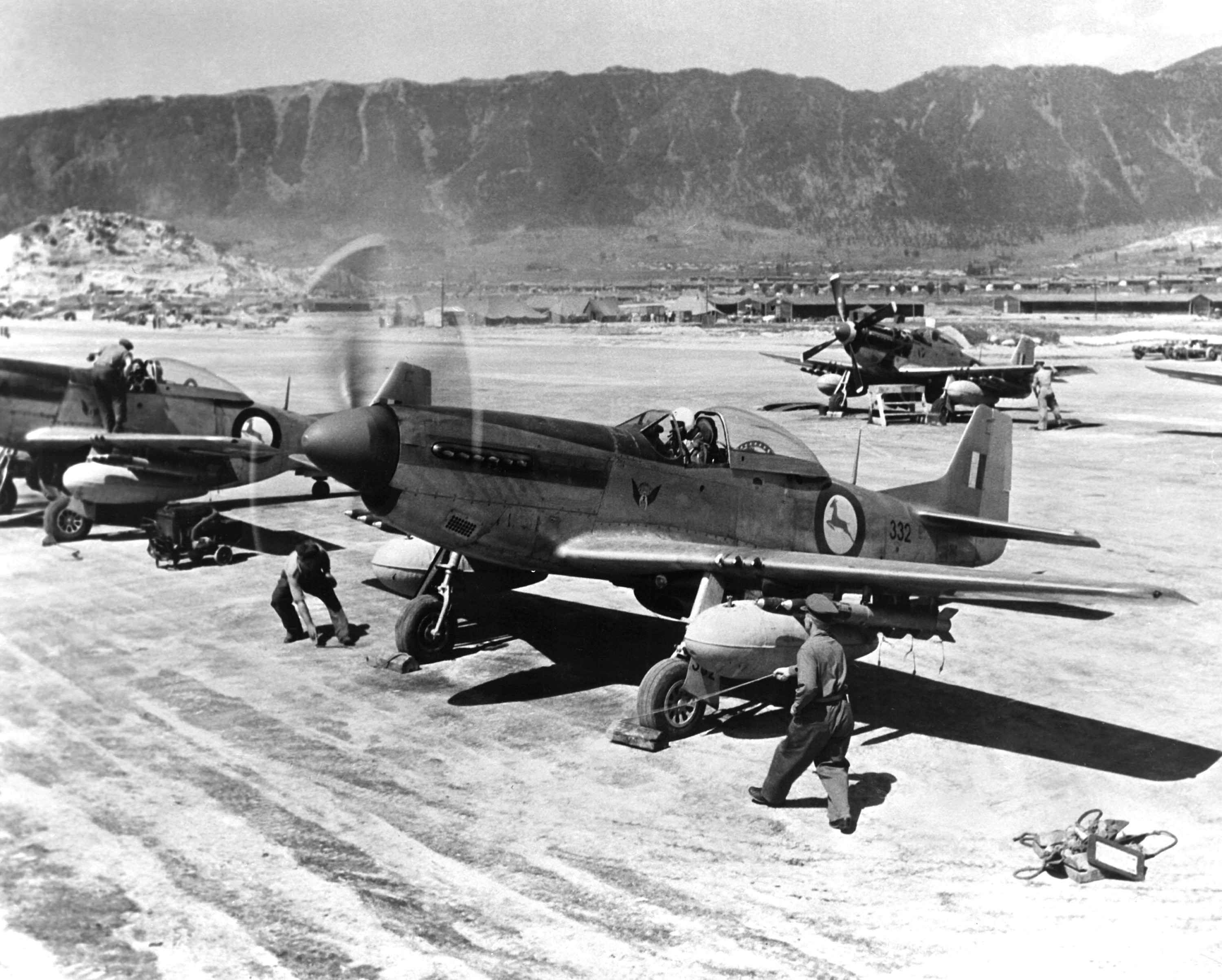
South African Mustangs during the Korean War

The 18th Fighter-Bomber Wing was reassigned to Korea in July 1950 and entered combat. Its organization was as follows:

- 12th Fighter-Bomber Squadron (F-80C, F-51D, F-86F)
- 67th Fighter-Bomber Squadron (F-80C, F-51D, F-86F)
- 39th Fighter-Interceptor Squadron (March 1951 – March 1952) (F-51D)
- 2 Squadron SAAF, South African Air Force (November 1950 – March 1951, April 1951 – June 1953) (F-51D, F-86F)

At the outbreak of the Korean War, the 18th FBG's 12th FBS provided personnel to form the "Dallas" fighter squadron, which rushed into battle. In late July, the group headquarters with two of its squadrons (12th and 67th FBSs) deployed with F-80s from the Philippines to Taegu Air Base (K-37), South Korea.

From 28 July to 3 August, the 18th Group operated directly under Fifth Air Force then passed to the control of the 6002nd Fighter (later, Tactical Support) Wing. Pilots exchanged their F-80s for F-51 Mustangs. Combat targets included tanks and armored vehicles, locomotives and trucks, artillery and antiaircraft guns, fuel and ammunition dumps, warehouses and factories, and troop concentrations.

In August, advancing enemy forces and insufficient aircraft parking at Taegu forced the group to move to Japan, but it returned to South Korea the following month to support UN forces in a counteroffensive. Because the front advanced so rapidly, operations from Pusan East (K-9) Air Base soon became impractical, and the group moved in November to Pyongyang East Air Base (K-24), North Korea. The 2nd SAAF Squadron joined the 18th in mid-November.

Major Louis J. Sebille was posthumously awarded the Medal of Honor for his action on 5 August 1950: although his plane was badly damaged by flak while attacking a concentration of enemy trucks, Sebille continued his strafing passes until he crashed into an armored vehicle.

The Chinese Communist (CCF intervention) caused the group to move twice in as many weeks, first to Suwon AB (K-13), South Korea, then to Chinhae (K-10). From there the 18th FBG continued to support ground forces and carry out armed reconnaissance and interdiction missions. From November 1950 through January 1951, it earned a Distinguished Unit Citation for destroying roughly 2,400 enemy vehicles and severely damaging almost 500 more.

From early 1951 until January 1953, the group and its tactical squadrons, moving from base to base in South Korea, operated separately from the rest of the 18th FBW. The group earned its second Distinguished Unit Citation from 22 April to 8 July 1951, when it flew 6,500 combat sorties while operating from sod, dirt filled, and damaged runways to counter the enemy's 1951 spring offensive.

When in January 1953 the group rejoined the wing at Osan-ni AB (K-55), its squadrons transitioned to F-86 Sabrejets without halting the fight against the enemy. It flew its first F-86 counter air mission on 26 February 1953. In the final days of the war, the 18th FBG attacked dispersed enemy aircraft at Sinuiju and Uiju Airfields.

The group remained in Korea for some time after the armistice. The wing moved to Kadena Air Base, Okinawa in November 1954.

=== Cold War ===
Since November 1954, the 18th Wing under various designations has been the main United States Air Force operational unit at Kadena Air Base. Over the past 50 years, the 18th has maintained assigned aircraft, crews, and supporting personnel in a high state of readiness for tactical air requirements of Fifth Air Force and the Pacific Air Forces. Known Cold War-Era operational squadrons were:

- 12th Fighter-Bomber/Tactical Fighter (at Kadena AFB November 1954 – September 1967) F-86F, F-100D/F, F-105D/F/G
- 44th Fighter-Bomber/Tactical Fighter (November 1954 – March 1971) F-86F, F-100D/F F-105D/F
- 67th Fighter-Bomber/Tactical Fighter (67th FBS was at Kadena AFB November 1954) – March 1971) F-86F, F-100D/F, F-105D/F

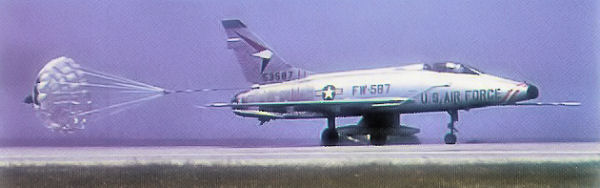
18th TFW North American F-100A-15-NA Super Sabre Serial, AF Ser. No. 53-1587, landing at Kadena Air Base.

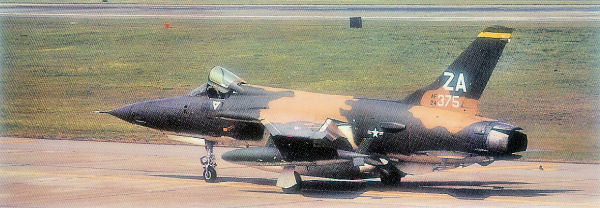
Republic F-105D-31-RE Thunderchief, AF Ser. No. 62-4375, 12th TFS/18th TFW on 18 May 1971. Noted in October 2003 at the Combat Air Museum, Topeka, KS and still there October 2006, this F-105 was the last of its kind in use with any US military service when retired from the Air National Guard in 1983. It was a static display for four years at McGhee Tyson ANG Base, Knoxville, Tennessee, prior to transfer to the Combat Air Museum in 1992.

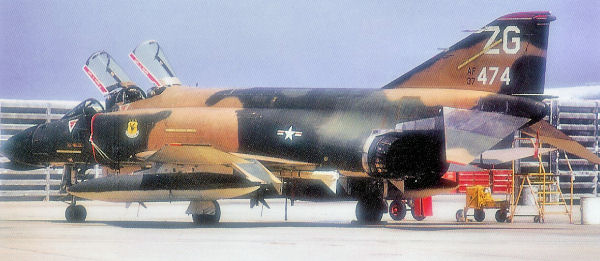
McDonnell F-4C-18-MC Phantom, AF Ser. No. 63-7474, 67th TFS/18th TFW (photo taken at Korat RTAFB, Thailand). This aircraft was later modified to the EF-4C Wild Weasel flak suppression aircraft.

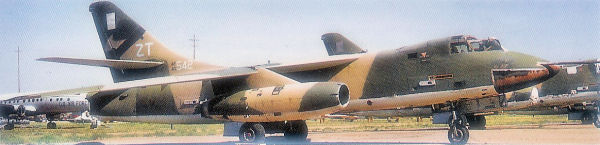
Douglas RB-66B-DL Destroyer (Modified to EB-66E), AF Ser, No. 54-0542, 19th TEWS/18th TFW on 23 August 1974.

Flying the North American F-86 Sabre, the wing supported tactical fighter operations in Okinawa, as well as in South Korea, Japan, Formosa (later Taiwan), and the Philippines with frequent deployments. In 1957, the wing upgraded to the North American F-100 Super Sabre and the designation was changed to the 18th Tactical Fighter Wing. In 1960, a tactical reconnaissance mission was added to the wing with the arrival of the McDonnell RF-101 Voodoo and the 15th Tactical Reconnaissance Squadron (Tail Code: ZZ) The McDonnell RF-4C Phantom II replaced the RF-101 in the reconnaissance role in 1967.

From 14 – 28 March 1961, the 18th Tactical Fighter Wing deployed the 15th Tactical Reconnaissance Squadron to Kung Kuan Air Base, Taiwan equipped with McDonnell RF-101 Voodoo. Beginning in 1961, the 18th was sending its tactical squadrons frequently to South Vietnam and Thailand, initially with its RF-101 reconnaissance forces, and beginning in 1964 with its tactical fighter forces supporting USAF combat missions in the Vietnam War. In 1963, the Republic F-105 Thunderchief replaced the Super Sabres. Known Vietnam-era squadrons of the wing were:

- 12th Fighter-Bomber Squadron (Tail Code: ZA, ZZ) (September 1967 – June 1972) (F-105D/F)
- Det 1, 12th Tactical Fighter Squadron (Tail Code: ZB) (F-105F/G)
  (Deployed at Korat RTAFB, Thailand, September–November 1970. Redesignated as 6010 Wild Weasel Squadron and reassigned to 388th TFW)
- 44th Fighter-Bomber Squadron (Tail Code: ZL, ZZ) (March 1971 – December 1972) (F-4C)
- 67th Fighter-Bomber Squadron (Tail Code: ZG, ZZ) (March 1971 – October 1973) (F-4C)

The deployments to Southeast Asia continued until the end of United States involvement in the conflict. An electronic warfare capability was added to the wing in late 1968 with the reassignment of the 19th Tactical Electronic Warfare Squadron from Shaw Air Force Base, South Carolina flying the Douglas B-66 Destroyer (Tail Code: ZT). The B-66s remained until 1970, flying daily over the skies of Southeast Asia.

During the 1968 Pueblo crisis, the 18th deployed between January and June to Osan Air Base, South Korea following the North Korean seizure of the vessel. Frequent deployments to South Korea have been performed ever since to maintain the air defense alert mission there. The McDonnell Douglas F-4C/D Phantom II replaced the F-105s in 1971, and a further upgrade to the McDonnell Douglas F-15 Eagle was made in 1979.

On 6 November 1972, the 18th Wing dispatched the McDonnell F-4C/D Phantom II fighters of the 44th and 67th Tactical Fighter Squadrons] to the Ching Chuan Kang Air Base in Taiwan until 31 May 1975, to assist Taiwan 's air defense, defend against aerial threats from China.

The following are the units that the 18th Tactical Fighter Wing once stationed at Ching Chuan Kang Air Base in Taiwan:

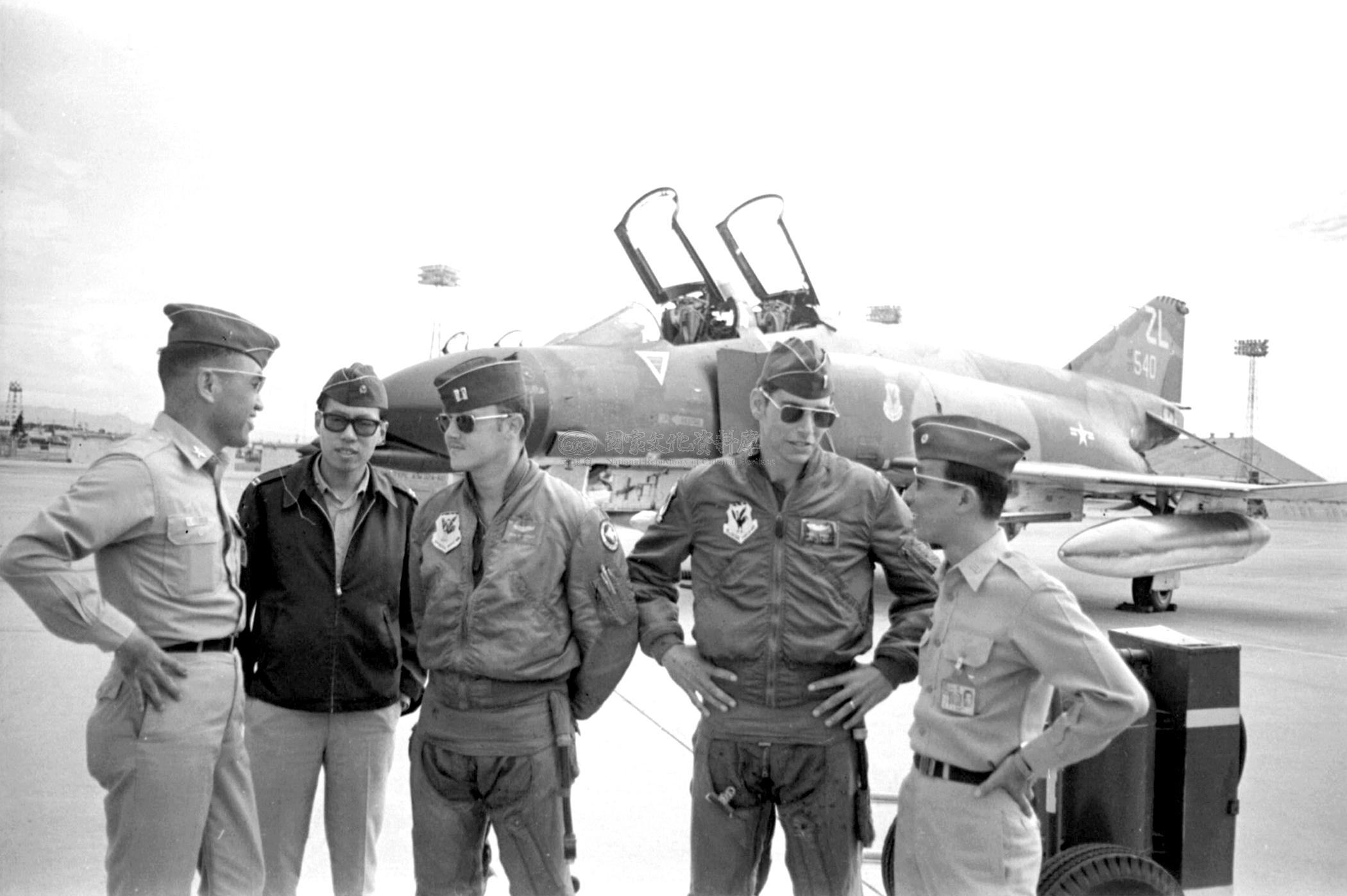
The 44th and 67th Tactical Fighter Squadron deployed to Ching Chuan Kang Air Base in Taiwan, two F-4 fighter pilots and ROC Air Force pilots were interviewed by reporters, 20 November 1972

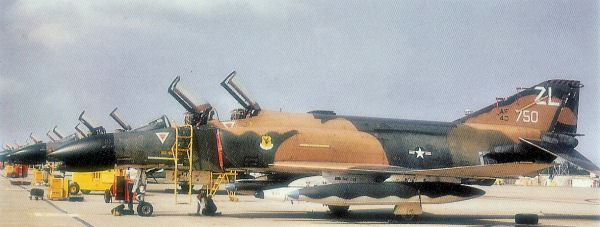
McDonnell F-4C-23-MC Phantoms of the 44th TFS/18th TFW deployed at Ching Chuan Kang Air Base Taichung, Taiwan, 2 October 1973. Serial 64-0750 in foreground.

- 44th Tactical Fighter Squadron (Tail Code: ZL)

(6 November 1972 – 10 April 1975) (F-4C/D)

- 67th Tactical Fighter Squadron (Tail Code: ZG)

(6 November 1972 – 31 May 1975) (EF-4C, F-4C)

In May 1971, the 556th RS was also transferred from Yokota to Kadena with Martin EB-57E Canberra aircraft (Tail Code: GT) to the wing. It inactivated in 1973. In 1972, the 1st Special Operations Squadron was assigned, bringing their specialized C-130E-I. (Combat Talon) The RF-4C reconnaissance mission ended in 1989 with the transfer of the RF-4Cs to the 460th TRG at Taegu AB in Korea.

Post Vietnam-era squadrons have been:

- 12th Tactical Fighter (June 1972 – May 1978, February 1981 – October 1991)
  F-4D (June 1972 – July 1979), F-15C/D (July 1979 – October 1991) (Tail Code: ZZ)
- 44th Tactical Fighter (December 1972 – May 1978, February 1981 – October 1991)
  F-4C (October 1973 – June 1975), F-4D (June 1975 – July 1979), F-15C/D (July 1979 – October 1991) (Tail Code: ZZ)
- 67th Tactical Fighter (October 1973 – May 1978, February 1981 – October 1991)
  F-4C (October 1973 – September 1980) (Tail Code: ZZ), F-15C/D (July 1979 – October 1991) (Tail Code: ZZ)

=== Addition of heavier aircraft ===
The designation of the wing changed on 1 October 1991, to the 18th Wing with the implementation of the Objective Wing concept. The original designation, as determined by the then Wing Commander, Brigadier General Joseph Hurd, was 18 Wing; meant to mirror the numbering convention of the Royal Air Force. This was quickly changed however when it was disapproved by PACAF but there are coins, etc. from this time period that depict the wing's designation as 18 Wing.

With the objective wing, the mission of the 18th expanded to the Composite Air Wing concept of multiple different wing missions with different aircraft. The mission of the 18th was expanded to include aerial refueling with Boeing KC-135R/T Stratotanker tanker aircraft (909th ARS); and surveillance, warning, command and control Boeing E-3B/C Sentry (961st AACS), and communications. Added airlift mission in June 1992 with the Beechcraft C-12 Huron, transporting mission critical personnel, high-priority cargo and distinguished visitors.

In February 1993, the 18th Wing gained responsibility for coordinating rescue operations in the Western Pacific and Indian Ocean with the addition of the 33d Rescue Squadron.

In November 1999, the 18th Wing underwent another change as one of its three F-15 units, the 12th Fighter Squadron, was reassigned to the 3d Wing at Elmendorf Air Force Base, Alaska.

In 2003 the 374th Aeromedical Evacuation Squadron at Yokota Air Base, Japan moved to Kadena and redesignated the 18th AES giving the 18th Wing an added mission of patient transport. 18 AES crews utilize the KC-135s of the 909th ARS as well as other opportune aircraft including the C-17 and C-130.

Between 24 and 31 March 2006, during Foal Eagle 2006 exercises, aircraft from the 18th Wing teamed with the U.S. Navy's Strike Fighter Squadron 151 (VFA-151) from Carrier Air Wing Two (CVW-2) to provide combat air patrols and coordinated bombing runs via the exercise's Combined Air Operations Center.

On 15 November 2026, the wing received its first F-15EX Eagle II, assigned to the 67th Fighter Squadron. It is the first of 36 to equip the wing. With its arrival, the wing's 48 F-15C and F-15D Eagles began to be withdrawn. The wing is the first outside the United States to fly the F-15EX.

=== Lineage ===
- Established as 18th Fighter Wing on 10 August 1948

Activated on 14 August 1948
Redesignated: 18th Fighter-Bomber Wing on 20 January 1950
Redesignated: 18th Tactical Fighter Wing on 1 July 1958
Redesignated: 18th Wing on 1 October 1991

=== Assignments ===
- Thirteenth Air Force, 14 August 1948
- Far East Air Forces, 1 December 1948
- Thirteenth Air Force, 16 May 1949 (attached to: Fifth Air Force, 1 December 1950; Twentieth Air Force, 1 November 1954 (further attached to 6332nd Air Base Wing until 9 November 1954); Air Task Group Fifth, Provisional, 1 February 1955; Twentieth Air Force, 16 February 1955; 313th Air Division, 1 March 1955; Fifth Air Force, 1 February-30 September 1957)
- Fifth Air Force, 1 October 1957
- 313th Air Division, 10 November 1958 (attached to Fifth Air Force ADVON, 28 January-13 June 1968; 327th Air Division, 6 November 1972 – 31 May 1975)
- Fifth Air Force, 1 October 1991–present

=== Components ===
Groups

- 5 Reconnaissance: attached 1 December 1948 – 16 May 1949
- 18 Fighter (later, 18 Fighter-Bomber; 18 Tactical Fighter; 18 Operations): 14 August 1948 – 1 October 1957 (detached 16 May-16 December 1949, 28 July-30 November 1950, 1–9 November 1954, and 3-c. 30 September 1955); 1 May 1978 – 11 February 1981; 1 October 1991–present
- 35 Fighter-Interceptor: attached 7–24 May 1951.

Squadrons

- 1 Special Operations: 15 December 1972 – 1 May 1978
- 12 Fighter-Bomber (later, 12 Tactical Fighter): attached 15 March-15 August 1957; assigned 25 March 1958 – 1 May 1978 (detached 1 February-15 March 1965, 15 June-25 August 1965, 23–29 January 1968); assigned 11 February 1981 – 1 October 1991
- 13 Tactical Fighter: 15 May 1966 – 15 November 1967 (detached)
- 15th Tactical Reconnaissance Squadron: attached 15 March 1960 – 19 April 1970, assigned 20 April 1970 – 1 May 1978; assigned 11 February 1981 – 1 October 1989
- 19 Tactical Electronic Warfare: 31 December 1968 – 31 October 1970 (detached 31 December 1968 – 10 May 1969)
- 21 Troop Carrier: attached 17 February-28 June 1950
- 25 Liaison: attached 1 December 1948 – 25 March 1949
- 25 Tactical Fighter: 19 December 1975 – 1 May 1978
- 26 Aggressor: 1 October 1988 – 21 February 1990
- 39 Fighter-Interceptor: attached 25 May 1951 – 31 May 1952
- 44 Fighter-Bomber (later, 44 Tactical Fighter): attached 25 July-30 November 1950; attached 1 February-30 September 1957, assigned 1 October 1957 – 25 April 1967; assigned 15 March 1971 – 1 May 1978; assigned 11 February 1981 – 1 October 1991
- 67 Fighter-Bomber (later, 67 Tactical Fighter): attached 1 February-30 September 1957, assigned 1 October 1957 – 15 December 1967; assigned 15 March 1971 – 1 May 1978; assigned 11 February 1981 – 1 October 1991
- 90 Special Operations: 15 April-15 December 1972
- 306 Tactical Fighter: attached 24 April-17 July 1962
- 307 Tactical Fighter: attached 21 December 1962 – March 1963
- 308 Tactical Fighter: attached March–July 1963
- 309 Tactical Fighter: attached 17 July-21 December 1962
- 336 Fighter-Day: attached 7 August 1956 – 1 February 1957
- 6200 Troop Carrier: attached 1 December 1948 – 16 May 1949
- Flying Training Squadron, Provisional: attached 15 October 1957 – 25 March 1958

Flights

- 3d Direct Air Support Flight, 8 October 1964 – 15 September 1968

=== Stations ===
- Clark Air Force Base, Philippines, 14 August 1948
- Pusan East AB (K-9), South Korea, 1 December 1950
- Pyongyang East Airfield (K-24), North Korea, 1 December 1950
- Suwon Air Base (K-13), South Korea, 4 December 1950
- Chinhae Airfield (K-10), South Korea, 10 December 1950
- Osan-ni Airfield (K-55), South Korea, 26 December 1952
- Ching Chuan Kang Air Base, Taichung, Taiwan, 14 July 1960
- Kadena Air Base, Okinawa (later, Japan), 1 November 1954–present

=== Aircraft ===
- P (later, F)-47, 1948
- F-51, 1948–1950, 1950–1953
- RB-17, 1948–1949, 1949–1950; VB-17, 1948–1949
- F-2, 1948–1949
- C-47, 1948–1949
- C-46, 1949
- RC-45, 1949–1950
- F-80, 1949–1950
- F-86, 1953–1955, 1955, 1955–1957
- T-33, 1954
- F-100, 1957–1963
- F-105, 1962–1965, 1965–1968, 1968–1972
- RF-101, 1960–1967
- RF-4, 1967–1989; F-4, 1971–1980
- C-130 (later, MC-130), 1972–1981
- T-39, 1975–1976; CT-39, 1977–1984
- F-15, 1979–present
- KC-135, 1991–present
- E-3, 1991–present
- HH-60, 1993–present

== List of commanders ==
No.	Commander		Term		
No.	Portrait	Name	Took office	Left office	Term length
1	Robert C. Oliver	Brigadier General; Robert C. Oliver (1902–1966)	14 August 1948	25 October 1948	72 days
2	Herbert K. Baisley	Colonel; Herbert K. Baisley	25 October 1948	1 December 1948	37 days
3	Jarred V. Crabb	Brigadier General; Jarred V. Crabb (1902–1981)	1 December 1948	June 1949	~182 days
4	Harold M. Turner	Major General; Harold M. Turner	June 1949	17 December 1949	~199 days
5	Clinton W. Davies	Colonel; Clinton W. Davies (1899–1989)	17 December 1949	1 December 1950	349 days
6	Curtis R. Low	Colonel; Curtis R. Low (1912–1991)	1 December 1950	1 February 1951	62 days
7	Turner C. Rogers	Brigadier General; Turner C. Rogers (1912–2007)	1 February 1951	2 February 1952	1 year, 1 day
8	Ernest G. Ford	Colonel; Ernest G. Ford	2 February 1952	7 March 1952	34 days
9	William H. Clark	Colonel; William H. Clark	7 March 1952	1 January 1953	300 days
10	Frank S. Perego	Colonel; Frank S. Perego (born 1916)	1 January 1953	15 June 1953	165 days
11	John C. Edwards	Colonel; John C. Edwards	15 June 1953	5 July 1953	20 days
12	Maurice L. Martin	Colonel; Maurice L. Martin	5 July 1953	31 July 1953	26 days
13	Avelin P. Tacon, Jr.	Colonel; Avelin P. Tacon, Jr. (1914–2014)	31 July 1953	17 July 1954	351 days
14	William D. Gilchrist	Colonel; William D. Gilchrist (1915–1999)	17 July 1954	26 July 1954	9 days
15	Cecil P. Lessig	Colonel; Cecil P. Lessig (1908–1984)	26 July 1954	1 November 1954	98 days
16	Nathan J. Adams	Colonel; Nathan J. Adams (1919–2008)	1 November 1954	9 November 1954	8 days
17	John B. Murphy	Colonel; John B. Murphy (1917–1984)	9 November 1954	4 February 1955	87 days
18	Homer C. Rankin	Colonel; Homer C. Rankin	4 February 1955	5 April 1955	60 days
19	Glendon P. Overing	Colonel; Glendon P. Overing	5 April 1955	3 May 1956	1 year, 28 days
20	Robert C. Orth	Colonel; Robert C. Orth (1910–1997)	3 May 1956	5 July 1958	2 years, 63 days
21	William S. Chairsell	Colonel; William S. Chairsell (1919–1994)	5 July 1958	15 August 1958	41 days
22	Gust Askounis	Colonel; Gust Askounis (1917–1996)	15 August 1958	23 August 1958	8 days
23	Francis R. Royal	Colonel; Francis R. Royal (1915–2016)	23 August 1958	14 July 1960	1 year, 326 days
24	James A. Wilson	Colonel; James A. Wilson (1936–2022)	14 July 1960	2 August 1960	19 days
25	Francis S. Gabreski	Colonel; Francis S. Gabreski (1919–2002)	2 August 1960	19 August 1962	2 years, 17 days
26	George B. Simler	Colonel; George B. Simler (1921–1972)	19 August 1962	19 May 1964	1 year, 274 days
27	Jones E. Bolt	Colonel; Jones E. Bolt (1921–2006)	19 May 1964	19 July 1964	61 days
28	Robert L. Cardenas	Colonel; Robert L. Cardenas (1920–2022)	19 July 1964	28 June 1966	1 year, 344 days
29	Neil J. Graham	Colonel; Neil J. Graham	28 June 1966	17 June 1967	354 days
30	Clarence E. Anderson, Jr.	Colonel; Clarence E. Anderson, Jr. (1922–2024)	17 June 1967	22 December 1967	188 days
31	Monroe S. Sams	Colonel; Monroe S. Sams (1922–1992)	22 December 1967	24 June 1970	2 years, 184 days
32	Philip V. Howell, Jr.	Colonel; Philip V. Howell, Jr. (1925–2004)	24 June 1970	19 May 1971	329 days
33	Robert F. Titus	Brigadier General; Robert F. Titus (1926–2024)	19 May 1971	29 May 1973	2 years, 10 days
34	Harold K. Wimberley	Colonel; Harold K. Wimberley (1924–2013)	29 May 1973	1 June 1974	1 year, 3 days
35	Charles H. Hausenfleck	Colonel; Charles H. Hausenfleck (1930–2024)	1 June 1974	1 December 1974	183 days
36	Clyde F. McClain	Brigadier General; Clyde F. McClain (1921–2010)	1 December 1974	14 July 1975	225 days
37	Lynwood E. Clark	Major General; Lynwood E. Clark (1929–2024)	14 July 1975	9 June 1976	331 days
38	Walter H. Baxter III	Brigadier General; Walter H. Baxter III (1926–2004)	9 June 1976	22 August 1978	2 years, 74 days
39	James R. Brown	Brigadier General; James R. Brown (1930–2015)	22 August 1978	11 February 1981	2 years, 173 days
40	Robert L. Rutherford	Colonel; Robert L. Rutherford (1938–2013)	11 February 1981	16 August 1982	1 year, 186 days
41	Philip M. Drew	Colonel; Philip M. Drew (born 1939)	16 August 1982	2 April 1984	1 year, 230 days
42	Richard E. Hawley	Colonel; Richard E. Hawley (born 1942)	2 April 1984	14 March 1986	1 year, 346 days
43	Frederick E. Beatty	Colonel; Frederick E. Beatty	14 March 1986	10 November 1987	1 year, 241 days
44	Robert W. LaTourette	Colonel; Robert W. LaTourette	10 November 1987	6 June 1989	1 year, 208 days
45	John B. Hall, Jr.	Colonel; John B. Hall, Jr. (1944–2020)	6 June 1989	1 October 1991	2 years, 117 days
46	Joseph E. Hurd	Brigadier General; Joseph E. Hurd (born 1943)	1 October 1991	21 July 1992	294 days
47	Jeffrey G. Cliver	Brigadier General; Jeffrey G. Cliver (born 1943)	21 July 1992	1 August 1994	2 years, 11 days
48	William T. Hobbins	Brigadier General; William T. Hobbins (born 1946)	1 August 1994	15 July 1996	1 year, 349 days
49	John R. Baker	Brigadier General; John R. Baker	15 July 1996	5 August 1998	2 years, 21 days
50	James B. Smith	Brigadier General; James B. Smith (born 1952)	5 August 1998	3 August 2000	1 year, 364 days
51	Gary L. North	Brigadier General; Gary L. North (born 1954)	3 August 2000	10 April 2002	1 year, 250 days
52	Jeffrey A. Remington	Brigadier General; Jeffrey A. Remington (born 1955)	10 April 2002	24 June 2004	2 years, 75 days
53	Jan-Marc Jouas	Brigadier General; Jan-Marc Jouas	24 June 2004	31 January 2006	1 year, 221 days
54	Harold W. Moulton II	Brigadier General; Harold W. Moulton II	31 January 2006	24 May 2007	1 year, 113 days
55	Brett T. Williams	Brigadier General; Brett T. Williams	24 May 2007	9 July 2009	2 years, 46 days
56	Kenneth S. Wilsbach	Brigadier General; Kenneth S. Wilsbach (born 1963)	9 July 2009	3 June 2011	1 year, 329 days
57	Matthew H. Molloy	Brigadier General; Matthew H. Molloy	3 June 2011	13 May 2013	1 year, 344 days
58	James Hecker	Brigadier General; James Hecker	13 May 2013	2 April 2015	1 year, 324 days
59	Barry Cornish	Brigadier General; Barry Cornish	2 April 2015	10 July 2017	2 years, 99 days
60	Case Cunningham	Brigadier General; Case Cunningham (born 1972)	10 July 2017	8 July 2019	1 year, 363 days
61	Joel L. Carey	Brigadier General; Joel L. Carey	8 July 2019	16 July 2021	2 years, 8 days
62	David S. Eaglin	Brigadier General; David S. Eaglin	16 July 2021	6 July 2023	1 year, 355 days
63	Nicholas B. Evans	Brigadier General; Nicholas B. Evans	6 July 2023	14 July 2025	2 years, 8 days
64	John B. Gallemore	Brigadier General; John B. Gallemore	14 July 2025	Incumbent	1 year, 125 days
