= List of operating units and shore establishments of the Republic of Korea Navy =

The South Korean navy includes the Republic of Korea Navy Headquarters, Republic of Korea Fleet, Republic of Korea Marine Corps, Naval Education and Training Command, Naval Logistics Command, and Naval Academy. The Chief of Naval Operations (CNO) is the highest-ranking officer of the ROK Navy.

The ROK Navy operates several naval bases in South Korea: Jinhae, Busan, Donghae, Pyeongtaek, Mokpo, Incheon, Pohang, Jeju Island, Baengnyeong Island. Jinhae has been the major port for the ROK Navy since the establishment of the Korean Coast Guard by hosting vital naval facilities including the Naval Shipyard; the Jinhae Naval Base Command is responsible for protecting the area. The Busan Naval Base has become another major naval base for the ROK Fleet since its Command Headquarters moved from Jinhae in 2007. Donghae, Pyeongtaek, and Mokpo hosts the command headquarters of the First, Second and the Third Fleet respectively. Incheon hosts the Incheon Naval Sector Defense Command responsible for protecting littoral waters close to Seoul, the nation's capital.

Naval air stations are in Pohang (K-3), Mokpo (K-15), and Jinhae (K-10).

== Organization ==
=== Republic of Korea Navy Headquarters ===
- Jinhae Naval Base Command
- Naval Forces Analysis, Test and Evaluation Group
- Information Systems Management Group
- Naval Military Police Group
- Naval Military Court
- Naval Archives and History Management Group
- Force Support System Project Group
- Service and Support Battalion, Seoul
- Maritime Medical Center
- Pohang Naval Hospital

- Republic of Korea Fleet
- Republic of Korea Marine Corps
- Naval Education and Training Command

- Naval Reserve Officer Training Corps
- Naval Basic Military Training Group

- Naval Logistics Command

- Naval Shipyard
- Naval Ordnance Ammunition Center
- Naval Supply Center
- Naval Information and Communication Squadron
- Naval Technology Research Institute

- Naval Academy

- Officer Candidate School
- Naval Academy Museum

== Republic of Korea Navy Headquarters ==
=== Chief of Naval Operations ===
- Office of Inspector General
- Office of Judge Advocate General
- Office of Chief of Chaplains
- Office of ACNO, Marine Corps Affairs
- Office of Public Affairs, Troop Information and Education

- Vice Chief of Naval Operations
- Office of Flag Secretary to CNO
- Deputy CNO Planning and Management (N5)
- Deputy CNO Manpower and Personnel (N1)
- Deputy CNO Intelligence and Operations (N2/3)
- Deputy CNO Logistics (N4)
- Office of C4I Planning (N6)

== Republic of Korea Fleet ==
=== Commander Republic of Korea Fleet ===
- First Fleet (HQ: Donghae)

- Maritime Battle Group One
  - Battle Squadron 11
  - Battle Squadron 12
  - Battle Squadron 13
- Logistics Squadron 1
- Base Squadron 1
- Training Squadron 1
- Early Warning Squadron 108
- Early Warning Squadron 118

- Second Fleet (HQ: Pyeongtaek)

- Maritime Battle Group Two
  - Battle Squadron 21
  - Battle Squadron 22
  - Battle Squadron 23
- Logistics Squadron 2
- Base Squadron 2
- Training Squadron 2
- Early Warning Squadron 208
- Incheon Naval Sector Defense Command
  - Patrol Craft Squadron 27

- Third Fleet (HQ: Mokpo)

- Maritime Battle Group Three
  - Battle Squadron 31
  - Battle Squadron 32
- Logistics Squadron 3
- Base Squadron 3
- Training Squadron 3
- Busan Harbor Defense Squadron
- Jeju Naval Base Squadron

- Submarine Force Command

- Submarine Squadron 91
- Submarine Squadron 92
- Submarine Squadron 93
- Submarine Squadron 95
- Submarine Squadron 96
- Submarine Squadron 97
- Submarine Education and Training Squadron 909
- Submarine Repair Yard

- Naval Air Command

- Naval Air Group 61
- Naval Air Group 62
- Naval Air Group 63
- Logistics Group 65
- Base Group 66
- Education and Training Group 609

- Component Flotilla Five

- Mine Squadron 52
- Amphibious Squadron 53
- Naval Mobile Construction Squadron 59

- Maritime Task Flotilla Seven
  - Maritime Task Squadron 71
  - Maritime Task Squadron 72
  - Maritime Mobile Logistics Squadron 73
- Naval Battle Training Group Eight
  - Maritime Training Squadron 81
  - Shore Training Squadron 82
- Naval Special Warfare Flotilla

- Special Warfare Squadron (UDT/SEAL/EOD)
- Sea Salvage & Rescue Unit (SSU)

- Naval Intelligence Group

== Republic of Korea Marine Corps ==
=== Headquarters Republic of Korea Marine Corps ===
- Yeonpyeong Unit
- Education and Training Group
- Logistics Support Group

- 1st Marine Division
- 2nd Marine Division
- 6th Marine Brigade
- 9th Marine Brigade
