= Clinton W. Davies =

American Air Force general (1899–1989)

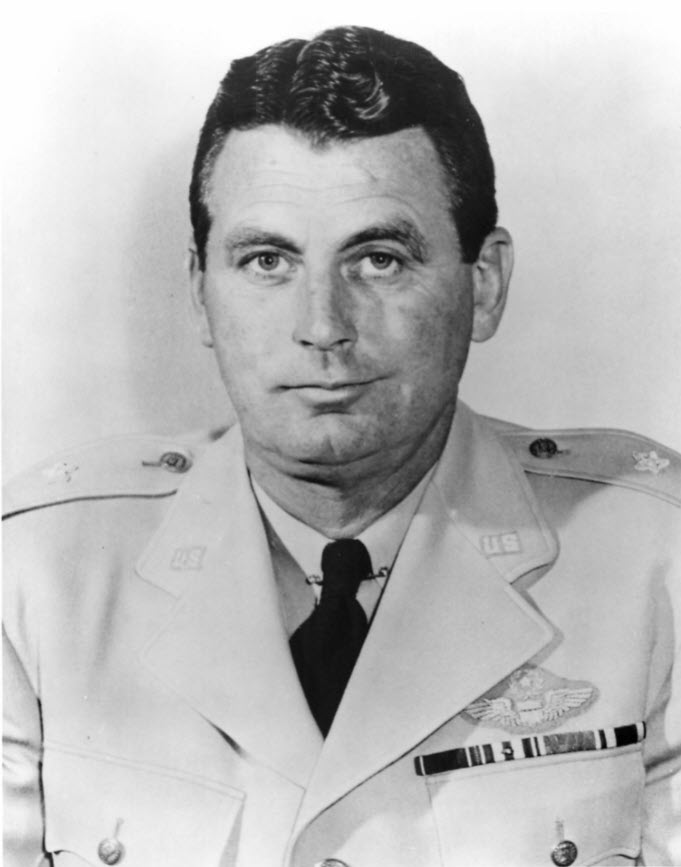
- Born: September 26, 1899; Racine, Wisconsin
- Died: January 31, 1989 (aged 89); Corona, California
- Burial place: Riverside National Cemetery
- Military career
- Allegiance: United States
- Branch: United States Army, United States Army Air Corps, United States Army Air Forces, United States Air Force
- Service years: 1918–1955
- Rank: Brigadier general (retired)
- Nickname: "Skippy"
- Commands: 313th Tactical Airlift Group; 18th Tactical Fighter Wing
- Conflicts: World War II

Clinton William Davies (September 26, 1899 – January 31, 1989) was a brigadier general in the United States Air Force.

== Biography ==
Davies was born in Racine, Wisconsin, on September 26, 1899. He had a twin brother; Frank C., and an older brother; John P. Jr. and sister; Anna. His father, John P. Davies (1853–1908), was the founder and owner of Racine Malleable & Wrought Iron Co.. His mother, Lillie E. (née: Case, 1865–1935), was a homemaker.

== Military career ==
In 1918, Davies began his career with the United States Army as a private. He was honorably discharged on December 21 that same year and resumed his studies at what is now the University of Wisconsin-Madison. He worked in flight training after ending his experience with the reserves in 1923.

Appointed an aviation cadet, Davies entered Primary Flying School at Brooks Field, Texas, graduated from Advanced Flying School at Kelly Field, Texas, a year later and was commissioned a second lieutenant in the Air Corps Reserve. In 1926, he became a second lieutenant.

He was commissioned an officer in the Air Corps, assigned to the First Pursuit Group at Selfridge Field, Mich. In 1926 he became a flying instructor, serving at Brooks Field, March Field, Calif., and Randolph Field, Texas, successively. Going to the Philippines in 1934, General Davies was a flight leader in the Third Pursuit Squadron at Clark Field. He entered the Tactical School at Maxwell Field, Alabama, in 1936, and graduated the following year.

Davies became married months before the start of World War II. He became a regular Army instructor, National Guard, at Newark, New Jersey. Two years later he was named commandant of the Advanced Flying School and in August 1942 he was assigned for duty with the Liaison Section, Eastern Defense Command, at Mitchel Field, New York.

During World War II, Davies commanded the 313th Troop Carrier Group and Tullin Air Base, Austria. Following the war, he was assigned to Continental Air Command before taking command of the 18th Fighter Wing and Clark Air Base in 1949. Reassigned to Maxwell Air Force Base in January 1952, where he was deputy director of administration at Air University headquarters becoming director of administration that June. In September 1954 he was appointed director of the Research Studies Institute there. He retired from active service on Oct. 31, 1956.

His decorations include the Legion of Merit, and the Brazilian War Medal. He was rated a command pilot.

He died on January 31, 1989, in Corona, CA.
