= Jeffrey A. Remington =

US Air Force officer (born c. 1955)

Lieutenant General Jeffrey A. Remington
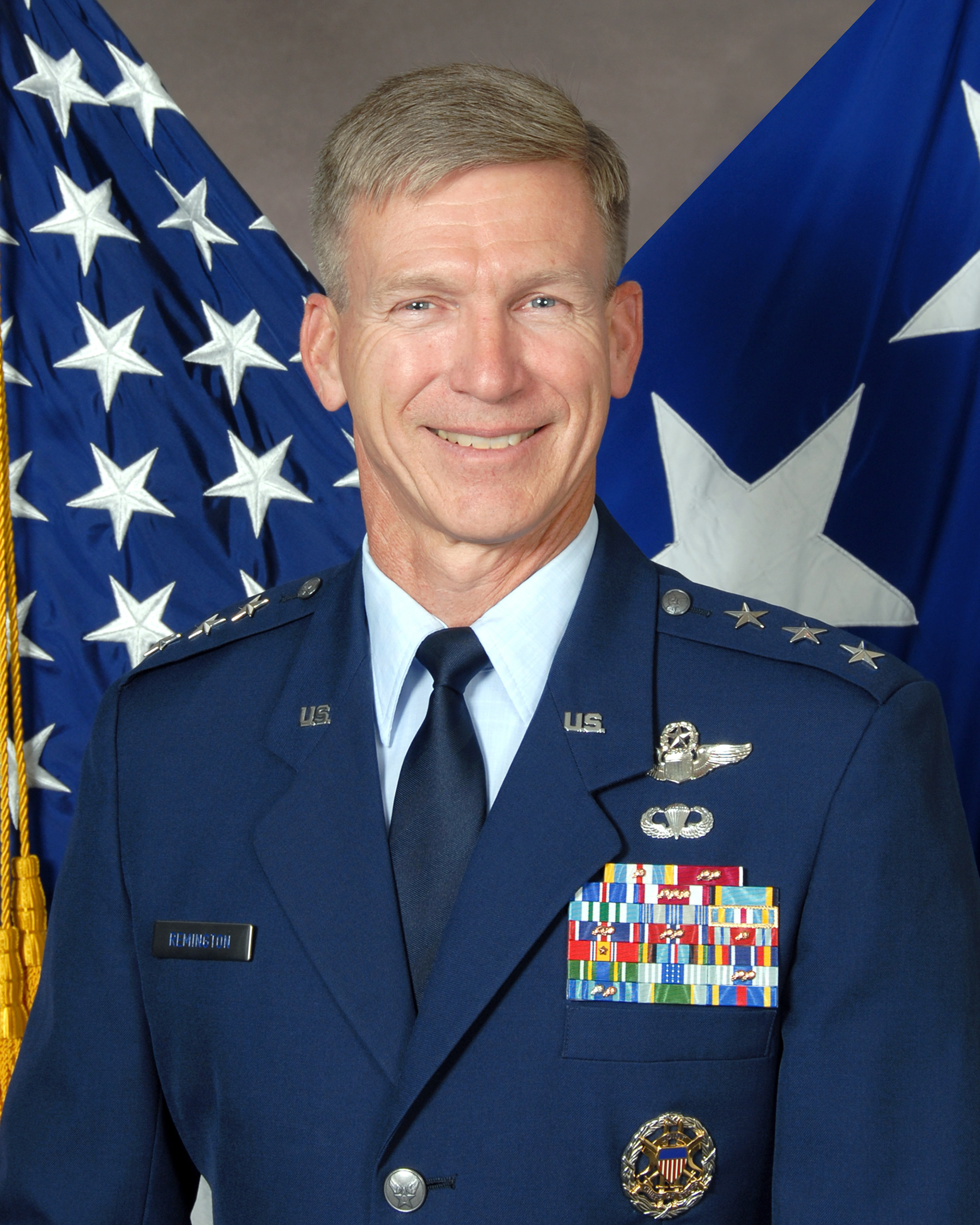
- Lieutenant General Jeffrey A. Remington, USAF, c. 2008
- Born: c. 1955 (age 70–71)
- Alma mater: United States Air Force Academy (BS); Embry-Riddle (MS); National War College (MS)
- Military career
- Allegiance: United States
- Branch: United States Air Force
- Service years: 1977-2012
- Rank: Lieutenant general
- Commands: 7th Air Force; 18th Wing; 27th Fighter Wing; 366th Operations Group; 80th Fighter Squadron
- Awards: Air Force Distinguished Service Medal; Defense Superior Service Medal; Legion of Merit (3); Distinguished Flying Cross; Meritorious Service Medal (4); Aerial Achievement Medal; Air Force Achievement Medal

Jeffrey A. Remington is a retired United States Air Force lieutenant general who last served as deputy commander of United Nations Command Korea; deputy commander of U.S. Forces Korea; commander of Air Component Command, Republic of Korea/U.S. Combined Forces Command; and commander of 7th Air Force, from November 2008 to March 2012. During that assignment, he also served as the U.S. representative to the joint committee for the Status of Forces agreement between the two countries.

== Military career ==
Remington entered the Air Force in 1977 as a graduate of the U.S. Air Force Academy. He earned his wings as a distinguished graduate of pilot training at Williams Air Force Base, Ariz. The general flew F-16s in Europe, including tours with U.S. Air Forces in Europe as a demonstration pilot and in a staff position. He later performed as solo pilot for the U.S. Air Force Air Demonstration Squadron, the Thunderbirds. His commands include the 80th Fighter Squadron, 366th Operations Group, 27th Fighter Wing and 18th Wing. He also held staff assignments at the Joint Staff, Headquarters Air Combat Command and Headquarters Pacific Air Forces.

Remington is a command pilot with more than 4,100 flying hours, primarily in the F-15 and F-16.

== Post-military career ==
Upon retirement in 2012, Remington has worked for defense contractor Northrop Grumman.

== Education ==
- 1977 Bachelor of Science degree in civil engineering, U.S. Air Force Academy, Colorado Springs, Colo.
- 1982 Squadron Officer School, Maxwell AFB, Ala.
- 1986 Master of Aeronautical Science degree, Embry-Riddle Aeronautical University
- 1990 Armed Forces Staff College, Norfolk, Va.
- 1993 Air War College, by seminar
- 1998 Master of Science degree in national security strategy, National War College, Fort Lesley J. McNair, Washington, D.C.

== Military assignments ==
1. September 1977 - August 1978, student, undergraduate pilot training, Williams AFB, Ariz.
2. September 1978 - June 1982, T-38 instructor pilot, check pilot and flight examiner, Williams AFB, Ariz.
3. July 1982 - October 1982, student and Top Gun, lead-in fighter training, Holloman AFB, N.M.
4. November 1982 - June 1983, student, F-16 pilot training, MacDill AFB, Fla.
5. July 1983 - June 1986, F-16 flight commander, instructor pilot and F-16 demonstration pilot, U.S. Air Forces in Europe, Torrejon Air Base, Spain
6. July 1986 - August 1987, chief, Rated Staff, Supplement and Air Liaison Officer Branch, Headquarters U.S. Air Forces in Europe, Ramstein AB, West Germany
7. September 1987 - December 1989, opposing and lead solo pilot, and operations officer, United States Air Force Thunderbirds Thunderbirds, Nellis AFB, Nev.
8. January 1990 - June 1990, student, Armed Forces Staff College, Norfolk, Va.
9. July 1990 - February 1994, rated management function manager, Warrior Management Division; command briefer and speech writer, Tactical Air Command Commanders Action Group; and chief of senior officer management, Headquarters Air Combat Command, Langley AFB, Va.
10. March 1994 - April 1994, student, F-16 requalification training, Luke AFB, Ariz.
11. May 1994 - April 1995, commander of 80th Fighter Squadron, later, Deputy commander of 8th Support Group, Kunsan AB, South Korea
12. April 1995 - July 1997, deputy commander, later, commander, of 366th Operations Group, Mountain Home AFB, Idaho
13. August 1997 - June 1998, student, National War College, Fort Lesley J. McNair, Washington, D.C.
14. June 1998 - April 2000, chief of Policy Division, Directorate for Strategic Plans and Policy; executive assistant to the Director of the Joint Staff, the Pentagon, Washington, D.C.
15. May 2000 - March 2002, commander of 27th Fighter Wing, Cannon AFB, N.M.
16. April 2002 - June 2004, commander of 18th Wing, Kadena AB, Japan
17. June 2004 - July 2006, deputy director of Politico-Military Affairs for Asia, Joint Staff, the Pentagon, Washington, D.C.
18. July 2006 - October 2008, director of operations, plans, requirements and programs, Headquarters Pacific Air Forces, Hickam AFB, Hawaii
19. November 2008 - March 2012, deputy commander of United Nations Command Korea; deputy commander of U.S. Forces Korea; commander of Air Component Command, Republic of Korea/U.S. Combined Forces Command; and commander of 7th Air Force, Pacific Air Forces, Osan Air Base, South Korea

== Effective dates of promotion ==
Insignia	Rank	Date of rank
	Second Lieutenant	June 1, 1977
	First Lieutenant	June 1, 1979
	Captain	June 1, 1981
	Major	March 1, 1988
	Lieutenant Colonel	April 1, 1991
	Colonel	October 1, 1996
	Brigadier General	February 1, 2003
	Major General	August 2, 2006
	Lieutenant General	November 24, 2008
