= Robert C. Oliver =

US Air Force brigadier general (1902–1966)

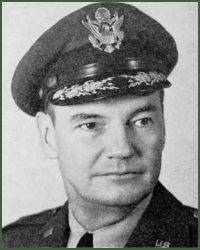
- Born: 1 May 1902; Manila, Philippine Territory
- Died: 13 January 1966 (aged 63)
- Children: Robert Townshend Oliver
- Military career
- Allegiance: United States
- Branch: United States Army (1923–1947); United States Air Force (1947–1953)
- Service years: 1923–1953
- Rank: Brigadier general
- Commands: X Air Service Command; China-Burma-India Air Service Command; 56th Combat Crew Wing; 301st Fighter Wing; 313th Bombardment Wing; Thirteenth Air Force; 59th Air Depot Wing
- Conflicts: World War II; North African campaign; China-Burma-India Theater
- Awards: Legion of Merit; Army Distinguished Service Medal; Air Medal; Commendation Medal (6); Order of Rafidran (Iraq); Order of Chien Yuan (China); Legion of Honor (Philippines)

Robert Chaffee Oliver (1 May 1902 – 13 January 1966) was a United States Air Force (USAF) brigadier general who commanded the X Air Service Command and the China-Burma-India Theater (CBI) Air Service Command during World War II.

== Early life ==
Robert Chaffee Oliver was born in Manila in the Philippines, the son of Robert Todd Oliver, an army dentist who rose to the rank of colonel, and Jesse Rowe Oliver. He grew up as an Army brat.

Oliver entered the United States Military Academy at West Point, New York, on 13 June 1919. He participated in sports, sang in the Cadet Choir for four years, played guitar, and took part in the traditional Color Line and Hundredth Night theatrical events. He graduated on 12 June 1923, ranked 160th in his class, and was commissioned as a second lieutenant in the field artillery. His first posting was on 19 September, to the 6th Field Artillery Regiment at Fort Benning, Georgia, where he became aide-de-camp to Brigadier General Edgar T. Collins.

While at West Point, Oliver courted Dorothy Townshend, who was also an Army brat. They married in 1923, and had one child, Robert Townshend Oliver. Oliver was promoted to first lieutenant on 8 May 1928. He became an assistant recruiting officer in Washington, D.C., on 20 July 1928, but returned to Fort Benning, where he joined the 83rd Field Artillery Battalion on 14 September. He was a student officer the Field Artillery School at Fort Sill, Oklahoma from 5 August 1929 to 14 June 1930.

== Air Corps ==
After flight training at the Air Corps Primary Flying School at Brooks Field, Texas, Oliver transferred to the Air Corps on 11 July 1930. He underwent further training at the Air Corps Advanced Flying School at Kelly Field, Texas, from which he graduated on 20 September 1931. He served at the Schofield Barracks in Hawaii with the 19th Pursuit Squadron until 22 November 1933, and then returned to Kelly Field, where he served with the 47th Flying School Squadron.

He attended the Air Corps Tactical School at Maxwell Field, Alabama, from 25 August 1934 to 4 June 1935. He was promoted to captain on 1 August 1935. He then attended the United States Army Command and General Staff College at Fort Leavenworth, Kansas, from 19 August 1936 to 22 June 1937, after which he was assigned to the Air Corps tactical School as an instructor in military intelligence. He was promoted to major on 1 July 1940, and to lieutenant colonel on 15 November 1941.

== World War II ==
From November 1941 to May 1942 he was the air tactical and strategical representative with the U.S. Mission to Africa, the Middle East and India, with the rank of colonel from 1 March 1942. With the United States now involved in World War II, he became commander of the X Air Service Command, based in Delhi, India. He was promoted to brigadier general on 11 December 1942. On 1 February 1943 he assumed command of the China-Burma-India Theater Air Service Command.

Oliver returned to the United States in June 1944, and commanded the 56th Combat Crew Wing at Morris Field, North Carolina, from 2 August 1944 to 31 August 1945. During this time he served on temporary duty as the aide-de-camp to the Governor General of Canada, the Earl of Athlone, from 21 to 26 March 1945, and to Abd al-Ilah, the Regent of Iraq, from 24 May to 22 June 1945.

Oliver became chief of staff of the Army Air Forces Central Flying Training at Randolph Field, Texas, on 8 September 1945, and its commanding general on 27 November.

== Post war ==
From 23 September to 31 December 1946, Oliver was chief of staff of the 1st Air Division on Okinawa. He then became the commanding general of the 301st Fighter Wing there from 1 January to 24 March 1947. He was chief of staff of the Thirteenth Air Force at Fort William McKinley in the Philippines from 25 March to 11 June, commanded the 313th Bombardment Wing from 12 June to 6 August, and resumed as chief of staff of the Thirteenth Air Force from 7 August 1947 to 14 August 1948. He commanded the 18th Fighter Wing there from 15 August to 31 October 1948, and Thirteenth Air Force until 29 November.

With his tour of duty in the Philippines ended, he returned to the United States as vice commander of the Ninth Air Force at Langley Air Force Base in Virginia from 29 January to 30 November 1949. After service as deputy chief of staff for materiel at United States Air Force headquarters, his final assignment was as commander of the 59th Air Depot Wing at RAF Burtonwood, England, on 13 January 1950. He retired after thirty years of service in 1953.

His decorations included the Legion of Merit, Army Distinguished Service Medal, Air Medal, the Commendation Medal with five oak leaf clusters, the Iraqi Order of Rafidran, Chinese Order of Chien Yuan and Decoration of the Heavens, and the Philippine Legion of Honor.

Oliver died on 25 February 1979 and was buried with his father and mother in Arlington National Cemetery.
