= Robert L. Rutherford =

United States Air Force general

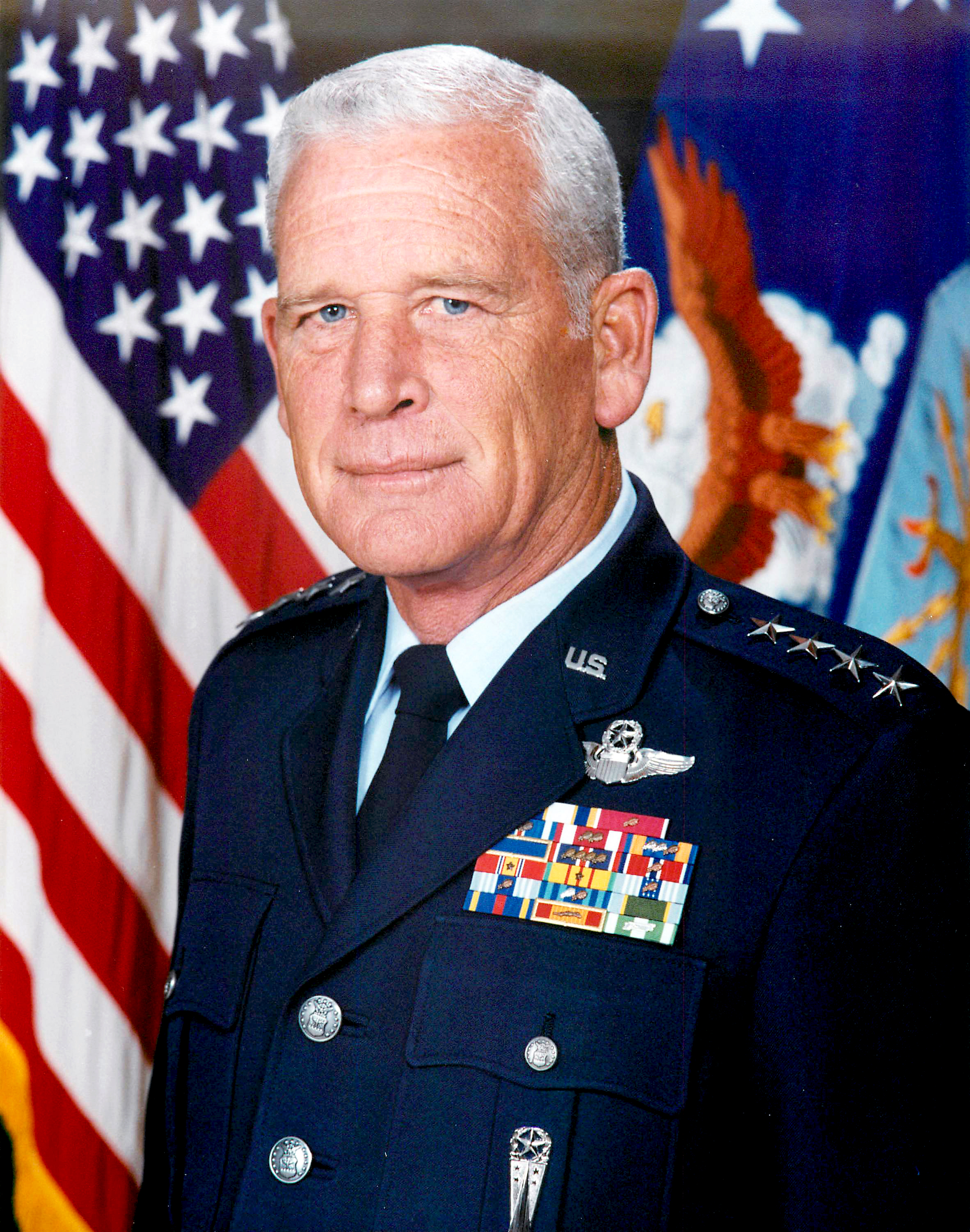
- Born: December 11, 1938; Luling, Texas
- Died: July 4, 2013 (aged 74); San Antonio, Texas
- Burial place: Fort Sam Houston National Cemetery
- Military career
- Allegiance: United States
- Branch: United States Air Force
- Service years: 1961–1996
- Rank: General
- Nickname: Skip
- Commands: Air Mobility Command; United States Transportation Command; Pacific Air Force; 17th Air Force; Air Force Recruiting Service; 18th Tactical Fighter Wing; 347th Combat Support Group; 339th Tactical Fighter Squadron; 435th Tactical Fighter Squadron; 4th Tactical Fighter Squadron
- Conflicts: Vietnam War; Gulf War
- Awards: Defense Distinguished Service Medal; Air Force Distinguished Service Medal; Legion of Merit (2); Distinguished Flying Cross (3)

Robert Lynn Rutherford (December 11, 1938 – July 4, 2013) was a general in the United States Air Force who served as commander of the United States Transportation Command and of Pacific Air Forces. He was born in Luling, Texas.

== Military career ==
=== Early career ===
Rutherford entered the United States Air Force (USAF) in 1961 as a distinguished graduate of Texas State University's Reserve Officer Training Corps program. While in college, he earned a bachelor's degree in business administration. Upon graduation he married his college sweetheart Grace (Kita) Hyatt. They had two sons, Jim and Greg, and were happily married for more than 50 years. After graduation, he was a student in undergraduate pilot training, then flight instructor at Reese Air Force Base in Texas. During this time, he instructed students in the T-38 Talon. In 1964, he graduated from the Squadron Officer School at Maxwell Air Force Base. From October 1966 to April 1967, Rutherford was an F-4 Phantom pilot with the 479th Tactical Fighter Wing, at George Air Force Base in California. From April to July 1967, he was an F-4 aircraft commander with the 4th Tactical Fighter Squadron at Eglin Air Force Base in Florida. From July 1967 to May 1968, he was a Phantom commander with the 435th Tactical Fighter Squadron at Ubon Royal Thai Air Force Base, Thailand. During this time, he was deployed to the Republic of Vietnam, where he flew 161 combat missions during the Vietnam War, including 101 over North Vietnam.

=== Post-Vietnam ===
From May 1968 to January 1971 Rutherford was the operations staff officer, Airspace and Air Traffic Control Division, Office of the Deputy Chief of Staff for Operations, Headquarters Air Training Command, at Randolph Air Force Base in Texas. From January 1971 to July 1971, he earned a degree from the Armed Forces Staff College in Norfolk, Virginia. Between July 1971 and May 1972, he was the staff officer, Colonels Group, directorate of personnel, at the Headquarters of the United States Air Force, Washington, D.C. During the period between June 1972 and May 1973, he was the chief, critical skill management division, Colonels Group, Directorate of Personnel, USAF Headquarters, Washington, D.C. From May 1973 to February 1975, he acted as the chief, Regular General Officer Assignment Division, Directorate of Personnel, USAF Headquarters. Between February and September 1975, he was a T-38 instructor pilot and commander of the 71st Flying Training Squadron, Moody Air Force Base, Georgia. From September 1975 to July 1978, Robert served as the deputy commander for operations, 38th Flying Training Wing; assistant deputy commander for operations, 347th Tactical Fighter Wing; commander, 339th Tactical Fighter Squadron; commander, 347th Combat Support Group at Moody. Between August 1978 to July 1979, he attended the Air War College at Maxwell. In 1979, he earned a master's degree in business administration at Auburn University.

=== 1980s ===
From July 1979 to June 1980, Rutherford served as the deputy colonel for operations, 8th Tactical Fighter Wing, Kunsan Air Base, Republic of Korea. He then served as the vice commander, 18th Tactical Fighter Wing; commander, 18th Tactical Fighter Group; commander, 18th Tactical Fighter Wing at Kadena Air Base, Japan between June 1980 and August 1982. For the next year, beginning in September 1982, Robert served as vice commander, Air Force Military Personnel Center, and assistant deputy chief of staff for military personnel at Randolph AFB. Between September 1983 and January 1985, he was the commander of the Air Force Recruiting Service, and deputy chief of staff for recruiting, Headquarters Air Training Command at Randolph. Between January 1985 and March 1987, he was the deputy director of programs and evaluation, director of manpower and organization, Office of the Deputy Chief of Staff for Programs and Resources, at USAF headquarters. In 1986, he graduated from the National and International Security Program at the John F. Kennedy School of Government.

From March 1987 to April 1988 Rutherford served as the deputy chief of staff for operations, and deputy director of operations for the European Air Combat Operations Staff, Headquarters United States Air Forces in Europe, Ramstein Air Base, West Germany. During the time period from April 1988 to October 1989, he was the commander of the 17th Air Force, Allied Sector Three, and Allied Tactical Operations Center, at Sembach Air Base, West Germany. From October 1989 to May 1991 Robert was the deputy chief of staff for programs and resources, deputy chief of staff for productivity and programs, at USAF Headquarters.

=== Post-Cold War ===
Between May 1991 and May 1992, Rutherford was the vice commander of the Military Airlift Command at Scott Air Force Base in Illinois. From May 1992 to October 1994, he was the vice commander, then commander of the Pacific Air Forces, Hickam Air Force Base, Hawaii. From October 1994 to August 1, 1996, he was the commander in chief for the United States Transportation Command and commander of Air Mobility Command at Scott AFB. In 1996, he retired with the rank of four-star general.

Over his career, Rutherford flew over 4,000 flying hours in various airlift, tanker, fighter and trainer aircraft.

Rutherford died of natural causes on July 4, 2013, at San Antonio, Texas. He is interred at Fort Sam Houston National Cemetery.

== Awards and decorations ==
Air Force Command Pilot Badge

Defense Distinguished Service Medal
Air Force Distinguished Service Medal
Legion of Merit with one bronze oak leaf cluster
Distinguished Flying Cross with two oak leaf clusters
Meritorious Service Medal with two oak leaf clusters
Air Medal with eleven oak leaf clusters
Air Force Presidential Unit Citation
Air Force Outstanding Unit Award with four oak leaf clusters
Air Force Organizational Excellence Award with oak leaf cluster
National Defense Service Medal with one bronze service star
Vietnam Service Medal with service star
Air Force Overseas Short Tour Service Ribbon with oak leaf cluster
Air Force Overseas Long Tour Service Ribbon with oak leaf cluster
Air Force Longevity Service Award with one silver and two bronze oak leaf clusters
Small Arms Expert Marksmanship Ribbon
Air Force Training Ribbon
Vietnam Gallantry Cross Unit Citation
Vietnam Campaign Medal

== Effective dates of promotion ==
- Second Lieutenant May 28, 1961
- First Lieutenant January 16, 1963
- Captain January 16, 1966
- Major July 1, 1969
- Lieutenant Colonel May 1, 1973
- Colonel March 1, 1978
- Brigadier General June 1, 1983
- Major General August 1, 1986
- Lieutenant General October 1, 1989
- General February 1, 1993
