= Robert F. Titus =

U.S. Air Force brigadier general (1926–2024)

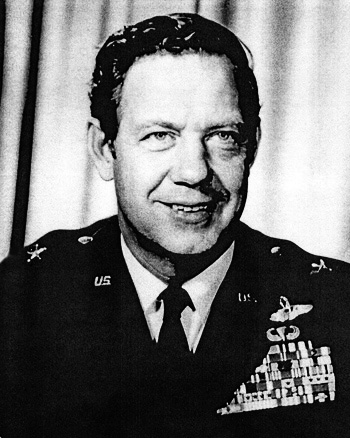
- Titus in 1970
- Born: December 6, 1926; Orange, New Jersey, U.S.
- Died: September 8, 2024 (aged 97); Colorado Springs, Colorado, U.S.
- Burial place: United States Air Force Academy Cemetery
- Military career
- Allegiance: United States of America
- Branch: United States Army (1945–1946); United States Air Force (1948–1977)
- Service years: 1945–1977
- Rank: Brigadier general
- Nickname: 'Earthquake'
- Units: 40th Fighter Interceptor Squadron; 39th Fighter Interceptor Squadron; 10th Fighter Commando Squadron; 389th Tactical Fighter Squadron
- Commands: 10th Fighter Commando Squadron; 389th Tactical Fighter Squadron; 15th Tactical Fighter Wing; 1st Tactical Fighter Wing; 18th Tactical Fighter Wing; 313th Air Division
- Conflicts: Korean War; Vietnam War
- Awards: Air Force Cross; Silver Star; Legion of Merit; Distinguished Flying Cross (4); Bronze Star Medal; Meritorious Service Medal (2); Air Medal (23)

Robert Farren Titus (December 6, 1926 – September 8, 2024) was a brigadier general and a career fighter pilot in the United States Air Force. Titus flew a combined total of 500 combat missions in Korean War and Vietnam War, and was credited in destroying 3 enemy aircraft in aerial combat during the Vietnam War. Titus retired in 1977, after 32 years of distinguished service.

== Early life ==
Titus was born in 1926 in Orange, New Jersey. He attended secondary schools in Maryland and Virginia, and studied mining engineering at Virginia Polytechnic Institute.

== Military career ==
Enlisting in the U.S. Army on January 25, 1945, Titus served with the 82nd Airborne Division in Berlin, Germany, and in the U.S. until he left active duty on August 2, 1946.

After serving two years in the U.S. Army Reserve, Titus enlisted in the Aviation Cadet Program of the U.S. Air Force on September 29, 1948, and was commissioned a second lieutenant. He trained to fly the F-51 Mustang and F-86 Sabre, and later served as a flight instructor for the F-51 and F-86 from September 1950 to August 1951.

=== Korean War ===
Titus served as an F-51 and F-86 pilot with the 40th Fighter Interceptor Squadron and 39th Fighter Interceptor Squadron in Korea from September 1951 to September 1952. On March 3, 1952, he received his first Distinguished Flying Cross when he led a flight of F-51s through dense clouds to the target near Sohui-ri, Korea, where they commenced a series of destructive attacks on enemy mortar positions and bunkers, with Titus personally destroying two heavy mortar positions, two bunkers and an ammunition dump. Titus flew 101 missions during the war.

=== Post-war ===
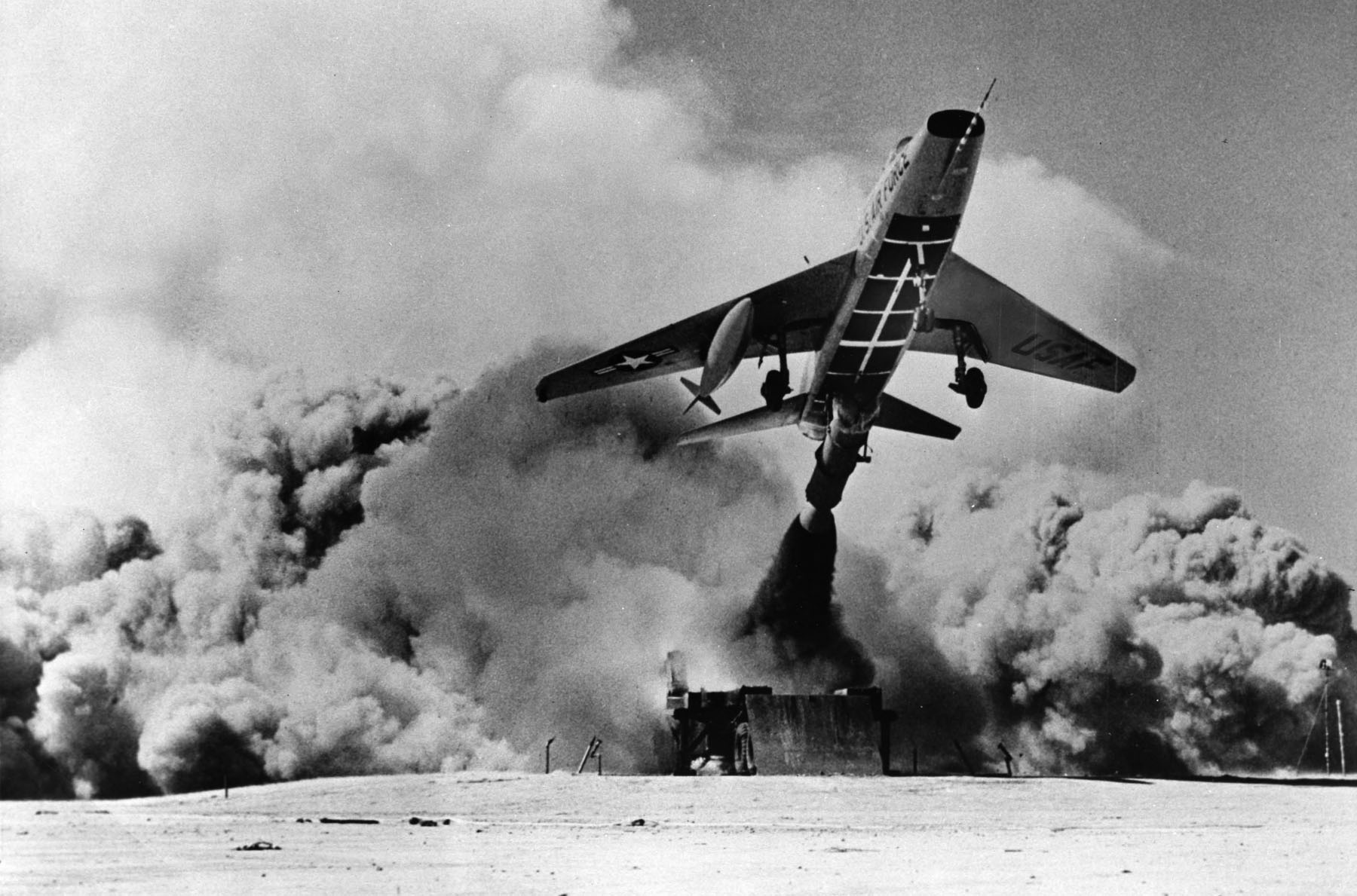
F-100D in trial of zero-length-launch system

After his return from Korea, Titus served as a ferry pilot at Dover Air Force Base, Delaware, from 1952 to 1954. He was selected to attend the U.S. Air Force Test Pilot School and graduated with Class 54B. He then spent six years as test pilot at Edwards Air Force Base, California, flying the North American F-100 Super Sabre, McDonnell F-101 Voodoo, Convair F-102 Delta Dagger, F-106 Delta Dart, Lockheed F-104 Starfighter, and Republic F-105 Thunderchief. Titus took part in the zero-length-launch tests, in which an F-100 was launched from a truck by a 300,000-pound thrust booster attached to the aircraft. In 1959, he participated in an historic trans-polar flight from United Kingdom to the United States in the F-100 Super Sabre, for which he received a second Distinguished Flying Cross.

Titus completed his master's degree at the University of Chicago on 1961, after receiving an Air Force Institute of Technology assignment to do so. He did a three-year tour flying F-105s in Europe and served in the Headquarters Tactical Air Command at Langley Air Force Base, Virginia, from 1964 to 1966.

=== Vietnam War ===
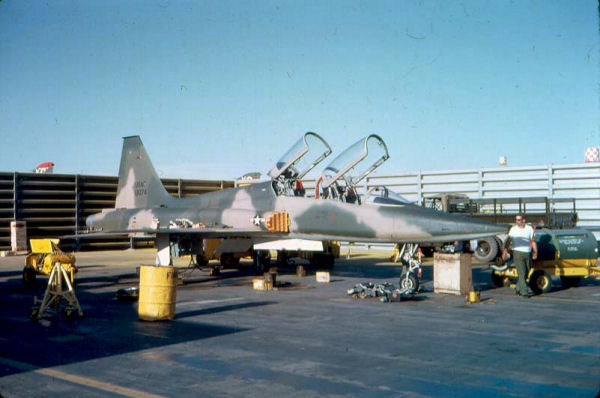
F-5B at Bien Hoa AB

Titus served as commander of the 10th Fighter Commando Squadron at Bien Hoa Air Base, South Vietnam, from May 1966 to January 1967. It was the only USAF F-5 Tiger squadron employed in combat during the war, as part of the combat evaluation for the F-5. He later took command of the 389th Tactical Fighter Squadron at Da Nang Air Force Base flying the F-4 Phantom II. On May 20, 1967, while leading a mission over Yen Bay, North Vietnam, Titus' flight encountered numerous North Vietnamese Air Force MiG-21s. Engaging them in three encounters, Titus shot down one MiG-21, while his flight destroyed another MiG-21. For his heroism in the mission, Titus received the Silver Star.

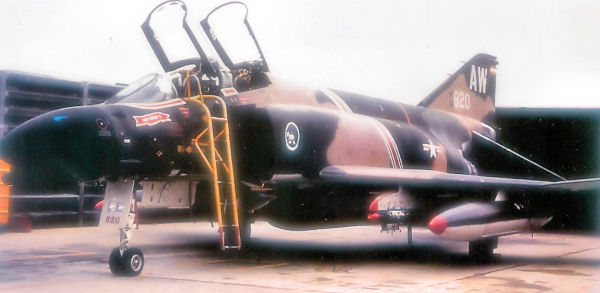
389th Tactical Fighter Squadron F-4D

On May 22, Titus and his flight were leading a cover for a strike group of F-105s in operations near Hanoi. During the mission, they encountered two MiG-21s which fired missiles and continued straight past the formation. Titus and his flight chased the MiG-21s, with Titus shooting down one of the MiG-21s with an AIM-9 Sidewinder. Titus continued to chase the second MiG-21 and engaged in series of rapid maneuvers from 25,000 feet (7,600 m) to about 2,000 feet (610 m) until they reached the vicinity of Hòa Lạc Air Base, where they encountered enemy flak and surface-to-air missiles. As the MiG-21 rolled wings level and started a high-G pullout at about 1,500 feet (460 m), Titus managed to shoot it down with an externally mounted M61 Vulcan in his F-4, thus crediting him with one of the few aerial gun victories during the war. For shooting down two MiG-21s in a single mission, Titus was awarded the Air Force Cross, the second only to the Medal of Honor. During the war, Titus flew 400 combat missions, and was credited in the destruction of three MiG-21s in aerial combat.

=== Post-war ===
In September 1967, Titus was assigned to Headquarters U.S. Air Force, where he was project officer for the F-15 Eagle and chief of Advanced Tactical Systems in the Office of the Deputy Chief of Staff, Research and Development. He entered the National War College in August 1969. In June 1970 he went to MacDill Air Force Base, Florida, as vice commander, 15th Tactical Fighter Wing (redesignated as 1st Tactical Fighter Wing) and later became commander. In May 1971, Titus was transferred to Okinawa and assumed command of the 18th Tactical Fighter Wing of the Pacific Air Forces at Kadena Air Base and later became commander of the 313th Air Division. He was appointed deputy chief of staff, operations, Air Force Systems Command, with headquarters at Andrews Air Force Base, Maryland, in August 1973. He then assumed duty as the U.S. deputy chief of staff, LIVE OAK, with headquarters collocated with Supreme Headquarters Allied Powers Europe at Belgium, in September 1974.

Titus' final assignment was as Inspector General for North American Air Defense Command from February 1977 until his retirement from the Air Force on August 1, 1977.

== Later life ==
Titus married Marjorie Winkler, on December 19, 1953. She died on July 11, 2006. They had four children and eight grandchildren.

After his retirement from Air Force, Titus moved to Colorado Springs, Colorado, where he resided. In 2007, Titus appeared on an episode of the History Channel series Dogfights. In the episode titled 'Gun Kills of Vietnam' features May 22, 1967 mission, where he shot down two MiG-21s. The episode also featured an appearance by Col. Milan Zimmer (USAF, ret.), who served as Titus' Weapons Systems Officer (WSO) during the mission. The episode was the fifth episode of the second season of the series, which recreated historical air combat campaigns using modern computer graphics.

During the Commemorative Flight of The Last USAF Mustang on April 18, 2015, Titus flew in the rear seat of Darryl Bond's P-51D Mustang “Lady Jo” at Petaluma Municipal Airport.

Titus died in Colorado Springs, Colorado on September 8, 2024, at the age of 97. He was buried with full military honors at the United States Air Force Academy Cemetery.

== Awards and decorations ==
During his lengthy career, Titus earned many decorations, including:

U.S. Air Force Command Pilot Badge
U.S. Air Force Parachutist Badge
Air Force Cross	Silver Star	Legion of Merit
Distinguished Flying Cross w/ Valor device and 3 bronze oak leaf clusters	Bronze Star	Meritorious Service Medal w/ 1 bronze oak leaf cluster
Air Medal w/ 4 silver oak leaf clusters	Air Medal w/ 1 bronze oak leaf cluster (second ribbon required for accoutrement spacing)	Air Force Commendation Medal
Air Force Presidential Unit Citation w/ 1 bronze oak leaf cluster	Air Force Outstanding Unit Award with Valor device and 1 bronze oak leaf cluster	Army Good Conduct Medal
American Campaign Medal	World War II Victory Medal	Army of Occupation Medal w/ 'Germany' clasp
National Defense Service Medal w/ 1 bronze service star	Korean Service Medal w/ 3 bronze campaign stars	Armed Forces Expeditionary Medal
Vietnam Service Medal w/ 4 bronze campaign stars	Air Force Longevity Service Award w/ 1 silver oak leaf cluster	Small Arms Expert Marksmanship Ribbon
Vietnam Armed Forces Honor Medal (1st Class)	Republic of Korea Presidential Unit Citation	Republic of Vietnam Gallantry Cross
United Nations Service Medal for Korea	Vietnam Campaign Medal	Korean War Service Medal

=== Air Force Cross citation ===

Titus, Robert F.
Lieutenant Colonel, U.S. Air Force
389th Tactical Fighter Squadron, 366th Tactical Fighter Wing, Da Nang Air Base, South Vietnam
Date of Action: May 22, 1967

Citation:

The President of the United States of America, authorized by Title 10, Section 8742, United States Code, takes pleasure in presenting the Air Force Cross to Lieutenant Colonel Robert F. Titus, United States Air Force, for extraordinary heroism in military operations against an opposing armed force as an F-4C Mission Commander in the 389th Tactical Fighter Squadron, 366th Tactical Fighter Wing, Da Nang Air Base, Vietnam, in action near Hanoi, North Vietnam, on 22 May 1967. On that date, Colonel Titus led his flight into one of the most heavily defended areas of North Vietnam in direct support of F-105 strike aircraft operations. Undaunted by accurate flak and five surface-to-air missiles that were launched at his aircraft, he repeatedly and unhesitatingly engaged numerous MiG-21s in defense of the friendly aircraft. During these aggressive and courageous aerial encounters, Colonel Titus destroyed two MiG-21 aircraft. As a direct result of his tenacity and extreme bravery in the face of great danger, the F-105 force was able to accomplish its assigned mission. Through his extraordinary heroism, superb airmanship, and aggressiveness in the face of hostile forces, Lieutenant Colonel Titus reflected the highest credit upon himself and the United States Air Force.

Titus was a Fellow of the Society of Experimental Test Pilots, a member of the Order of Daedalians, American Fighter Pilots Association, Red River Valley Fighter Pilots Association, and an honorary member of the American Fighter Aces Association.
