= David Eaglin =

U.S. Air Force general

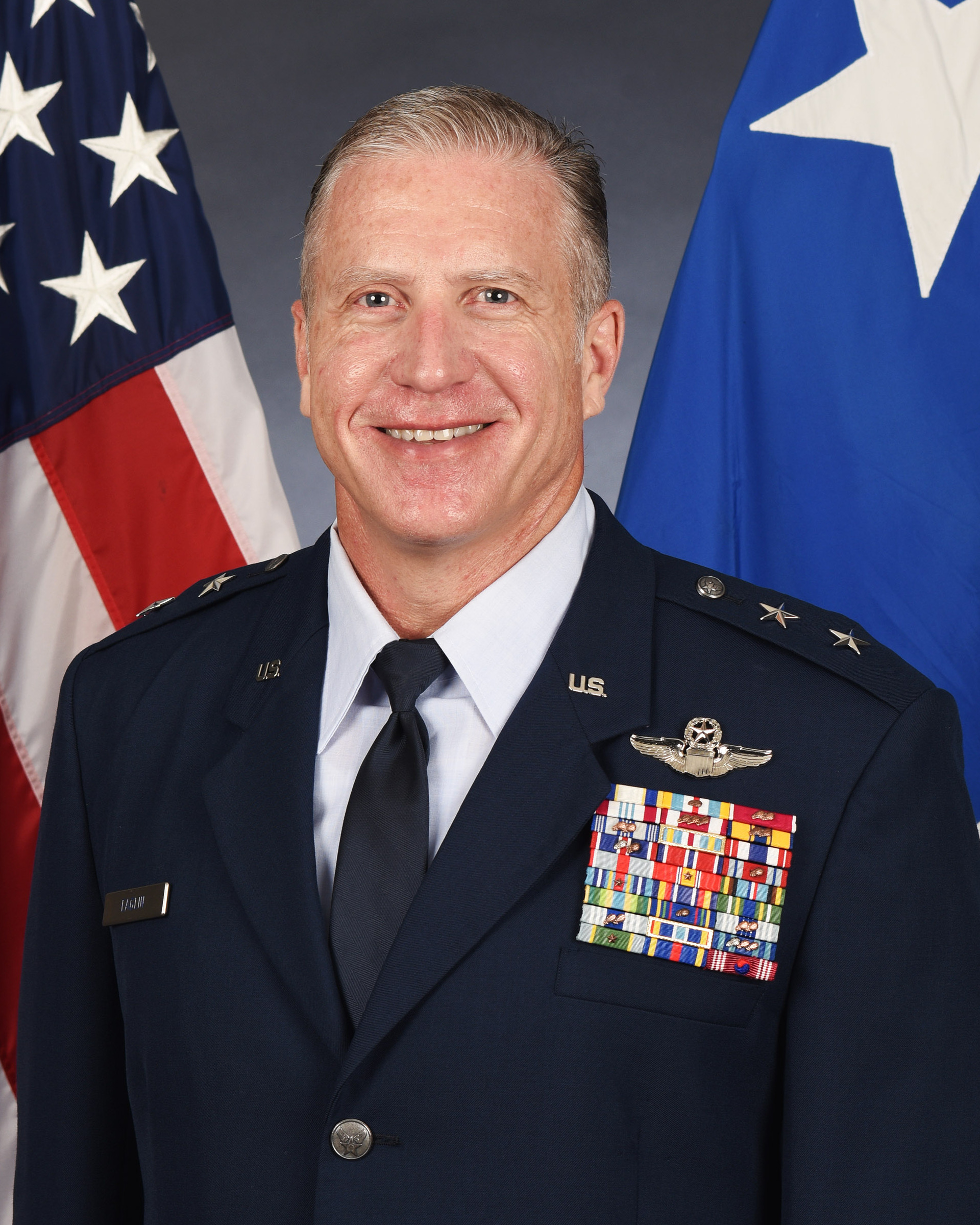
- Official portrait, 2024
- Military career
- Allegiance: United States
- Branch: United States Air Force
- Service years: 1994–present
- Rank: Major general
- Commands: 39th Air Base Wing; 44th Fighter Squadron
- Awards: Defense Superior Service Medal; Legion of Merit (2)

David S. Eaglin is a United States Air Force major general who serves as the deputy commander of the Seventh Air Force. Previously, he was the vice director of operations of the North American Aerospace Defense Command.

In February 2021, he was assigned to take command of the 18th Wing, replacing Joel Carey.

In July 2024, he was nominated for promotion to major general.

Military offices
Preceded by John C. Walker	Commander of the 39th Air Base Wing; 2017–2018	Succeeded by Britt Hurst
Preceded by Peter Fesler	Vice Director of Operations of the North American Aerospace Defense Command; 2018–2019	Succeeded by Joseph D. Kunkel
Preceded by Lansing Pilch	Deputy Commander of the Seventh Air Force; 2019–2021	Succeeded by Jason M. Rueschhoff
Preceded by Joel Carey	Commander of the 18th Wing; 2021–2023	Succeeded by Nicholas B. Evans
Preceded by David G. Shoemaker	Deputy Director for Operations of the United States Indo-Pacific Command; 2023–2024	Succeeded by Neil R. Richardson
Preceded by Brandon D. Parker	Director of Air and Cyberspace Operations of the Pacific Air Forces and Commander of the Thirteenth Expeditionary Air Force; 2024–present	Incumbent
