= Richard E. Hawley =

United States Air Force general

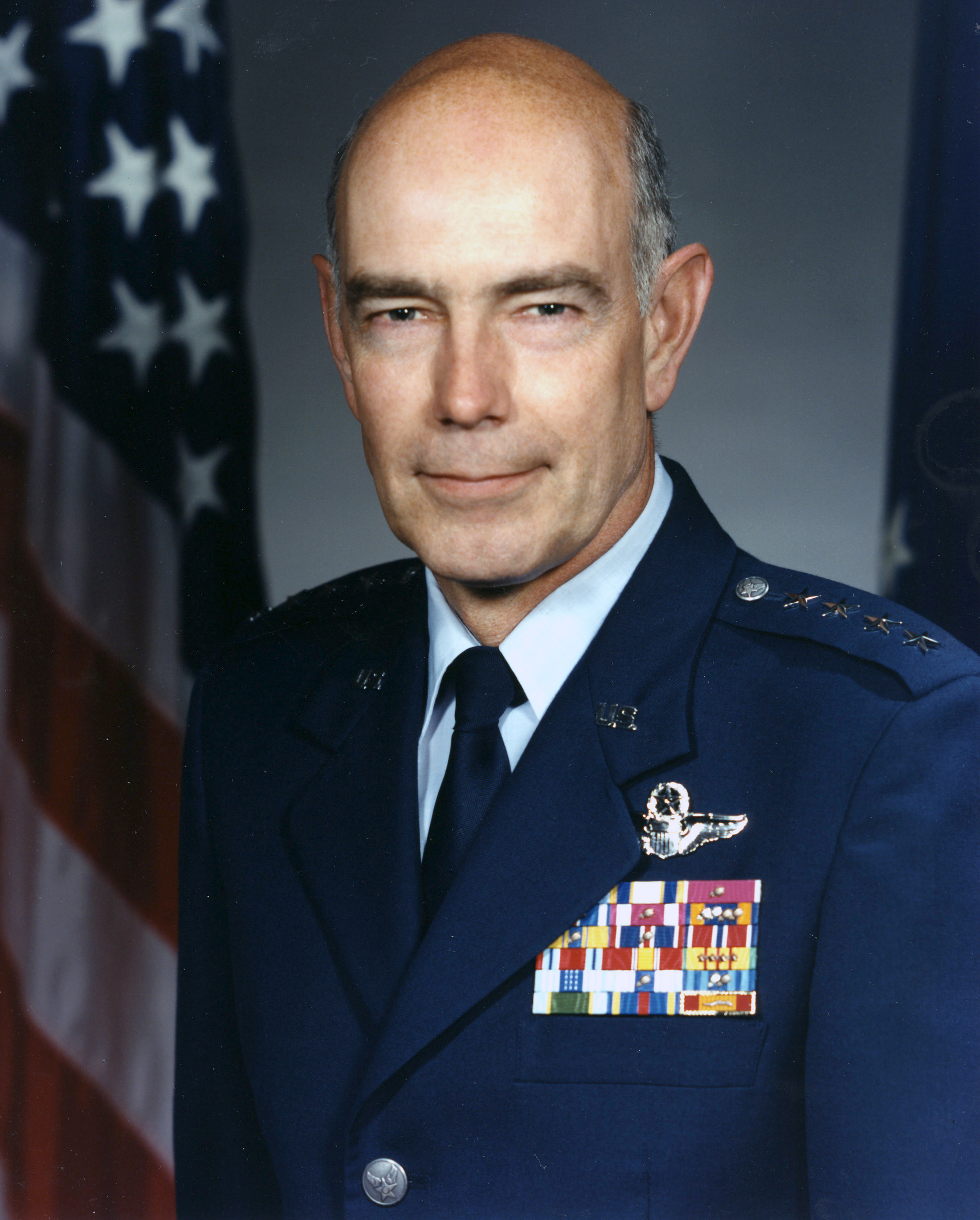
- Born: January 2, 1942 (age 84); Albany, New York
- Military career
- Allegiance: United States
- Branch: United States Air Force
- Rank: General
- Commands: Air Combat Command; United States Air Forces in Europe; United States Forces Japan; Fifth Air Force; 18th Tactical Fighter Wing; 347th Combat Support Group
- Conflicts: Vietnam War
- Awards: Defense Distinguished Service Medal; Air Force Distinguished Service Medal; Legion of Merit (2); Distinguished Flying Cross (3)

Richard Earl Hawley (born January 2, 1942) is a retired four-star general in the United States Air Force (USAF). He served as commander of Air Combat Command, headquartered at Langley Air Force Base, Virginia. As commander, Hawley was responsible for organizing, training, equipping and maintaining combat-ready air forces for rapid deployment and employment in the United States and worldwide. Hawley maintained command of 1,050 aircraft and approximately 103,400 active-duty military members and civilian personnel at 27 major installations in the United States, Panama, Iceland and the Azores, and, when mobilized, more than 64,400 Air National Guard and Air Force Reserve members

== Military career ==
Hawley graduated from the United States Air Force Academy with a Bachelor of Science in 1964. He served as commander of United States Air Forces in Europe and Allied Air Forces Central Europe with headquarters at Ramstein Air Base, Germany. He also commanded a USAF group, a wing and United States Forces Japan and Fifth Air Force, with headquarters at Yokota Air Base, Japan. He served as a forward air controller at Pleiku Air Base, South Vietnam, where he flew 433 combat missions during the Vietnam War.

Hawley is a graduate of Georgetown University (Master of Arts, 1965), Armed Forces Staff College (1974), and Naval War College (1982).

He is a recipient of the Defense Distinguished Service Medal, Air Force Distinguished Service Medal, Legion of Merit with oak leaf cluster, Distinguished Flying Cross with two oak leaf clusters, Meritorious Service Medal with oak leaf cluster, Air Medal with two silver and two bronze oak leaf clusters, and the Air Force Commendation Medal with oak leaf cluster.

Hawley retired from the United States Air Force on July 1, 1999.

== Assignments ==
- June 1964 – March 1965, student, Georgetown University, Washington, D.C.
- March 1965 – September 1966, staff officer, Office of the Deputy Chief of Staff for Personnel, Headquarters U.S. Air Force, Washington, D.C.
- September 1966 – September 1967, student, pilot training, Williams Air Force Base, Arizona
- October 1967 – September 1968, student, F-4C Phantom and O-2A Skymaster training, Homestead Air Force Base and Hurlburt Field, Florida.
- September 1968 – September 1969, forward air controller, Pleiku Air Base, South Vietnam
- October 1969 – September 1972, F-4D combat crew member, 36th Tactical Fighter Wing, Bitburg Air Base, West Germany
- September 1972 – June 1973, member, Headquarters U.S. Air Forces in Europe inspector general team, Wiesbaden Air Base, West Germany
- July 1973 – February 1974, student, Armed Forces Staff College, Norfolk, Va.
- February 1974 – March 1976, operations staff officer, Office of the Deputy Chief of Staff for Plans, Headquarters U.S. Air Force, Washington, D.C.
- March 1976 – September 1977, assistant executive officer to the Air Force chief of staff, Headquarters U.S. Air Force, Washington, D.C.
- September 1977 – July 1979, operations officer, 68th Tactical Fighter Squadron; assistant deputy commander for operations, 347th Tactical Fighter Wing and commander, 347th Combat Support Group; Moody Air Force Base, Georgia
- July 1979 – July 1981, director of operations, 1st Tactical Fighter Wing, Langley Air Force Base, Virginia
- July 1981 – July 1982, student, Naval War College, Newport, R.I.
- July 1982 – April 1984, vice commander, 313th Air Division, Kadena Air Base, Japan
- April 1984 – March 1986, commander, 18th Tactical Fighter Wing, Kadena Air Base, Japan
- March 1986 – September 1986, special assistant to the commander in chief, Headquarters Pacific Air Forces, Hickam Air Force Base, Hawaii
- September 1986 – August 1987, vice commander, 7th Air Force, Osan Air Base, South Korea
- August 1987 – August 1989, deputy chief of staff for plans, Headquarters Pacific Air Forces, Hickam Air Force Base, Hawaii
- August 1989 – August 1991, director of operations, Office of the Deputy Chief of Staff, Plans and Operations, Headquarters U.S. Air Force, Washington, D.C.
- August 1991 – November 1993, commander, U.S. Forces Japan and 5th Air Force, Yokota Air Base, Japan
- November 1993 – July 1995, principal deputy, Office of the Assistant Secretary of the Air Force for Acquisition, Washington, D.C.
- July 1995 – April 1996, commander, U.S. Air Forces in Europe and commander, Allied Air Forces Central Europe, with headquarters at Ramstein Air Base, Germany
- April 1996 – July 1999, commander, Air Combat Command, Langley Air Force Base, Virginia
