= Joel Carey =

U.S. Air Force general

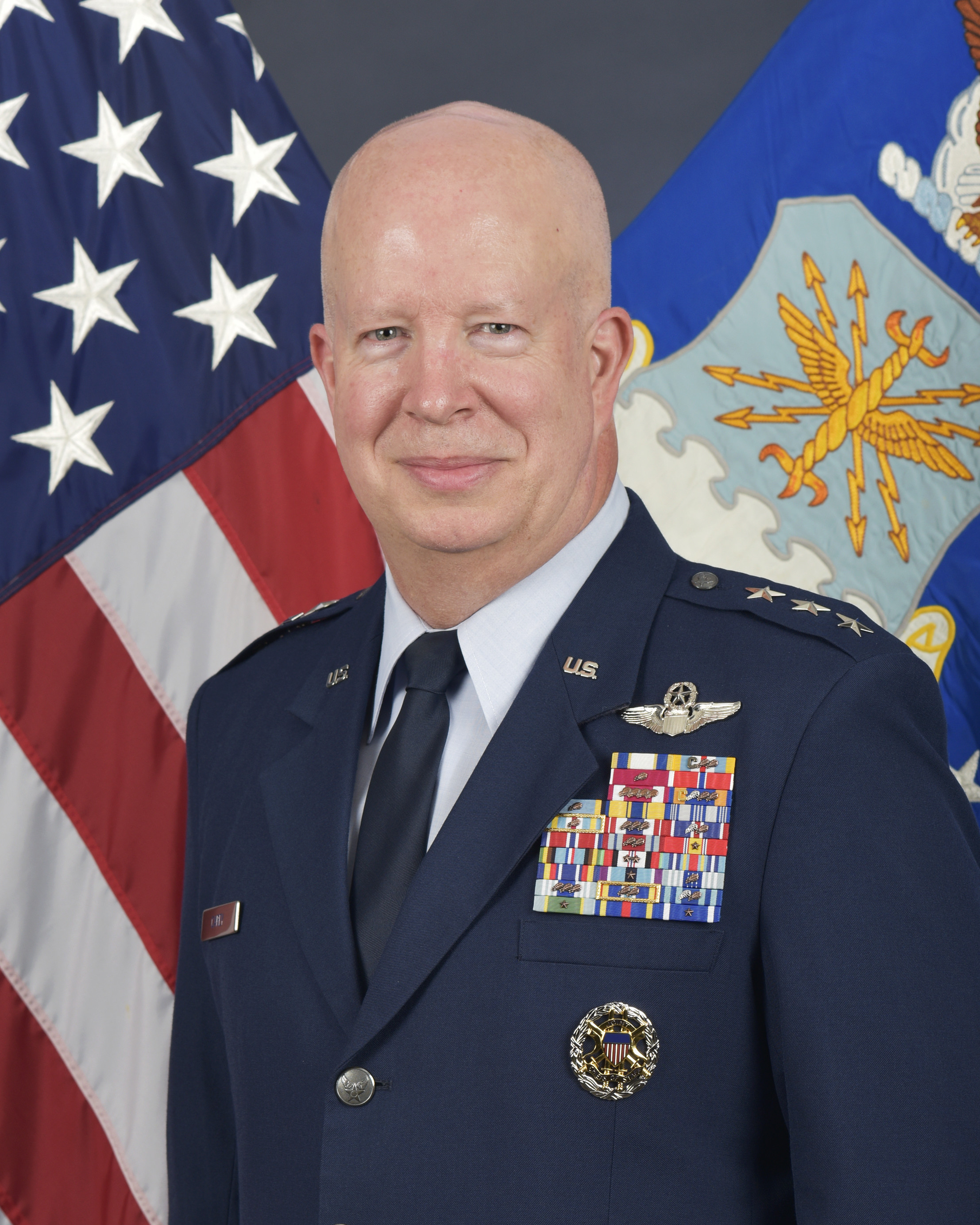
- Official portrait, 2026
- Military career
- Allegiance: United States
- Branch: United States Air Force
- Service years: 1992–present
- Rank: Lieutenant general
- Commands: Fifth Air Force; 18th Wing; 12th Flying Training Wing; 44th Fighter Squadron
- Awards: Defense Superior Service Medal (2); Legion of Merit

Joel L. Carey is a United States Air Force lieutenant general who serves as the Commander of the Fifth Air Force since 2026. He previously served as the chief of staff of the United States Indo-Pacific Command from 2024 to 2026, and as director of operations, strategic deterrence, and nuclear integration of U.S. Air Forces in Europe – Air Forces Africa from 2022 to 2024.

== Military career ==
Carey served as the Deputy Chief of Staff for Operations of the Allied Air Command and before that he was the commander of the 18th Wing and, prior to that, the vice commander of the Fifth Air Force.

In May 2022, Carey was nominated for promotion to major general, and in December 2025, Carey was promoted to lieutenant general.

== Honours ==
- Order of the Rising Sun, 3rd Class, Gold Rays with Neck Ribbon (2022)

Military offices
Preceded by Michael Snell; Acting	Commander of the 12th Flying Training Wing; 2016–2018	Succeeded by Randy Oakland; Acting
Preceded by Phillip A. Stewart	Commanding General of the NATO Train Advise Assist Command – Air and 438th Air Expeditionary Wing; 2018–2019	Succeeded by Jeffery D. Valenzia
Preceded by Case Cunningham	Commander of the 18th Wing; 2019–2021	Succeeded by David Eaglin
Preceded by Andrew P. Hansen	Deputy Chief of Staff for Operations of the Allied Air Command; 2021–2022	Succeeded by Christoph Pliet
Preceded by Derek C. France	Director of Operations, Strategic Deterrence, and Nuclear Integration of United States Air Forces in Europe – Air Forces Africa; 2022–2024	Succeeded by Joseph L. Campo
Preceded by Joshua M. Rudd	Chief of Staff of the United States Indo-Pacific Command; 2024–2026	Succeeded by Michael Drowley
Preceded by Stephen Jost	Commander of the Fifth Air Force; 2026–present	Incumbent
