= James R. Brown =

American general

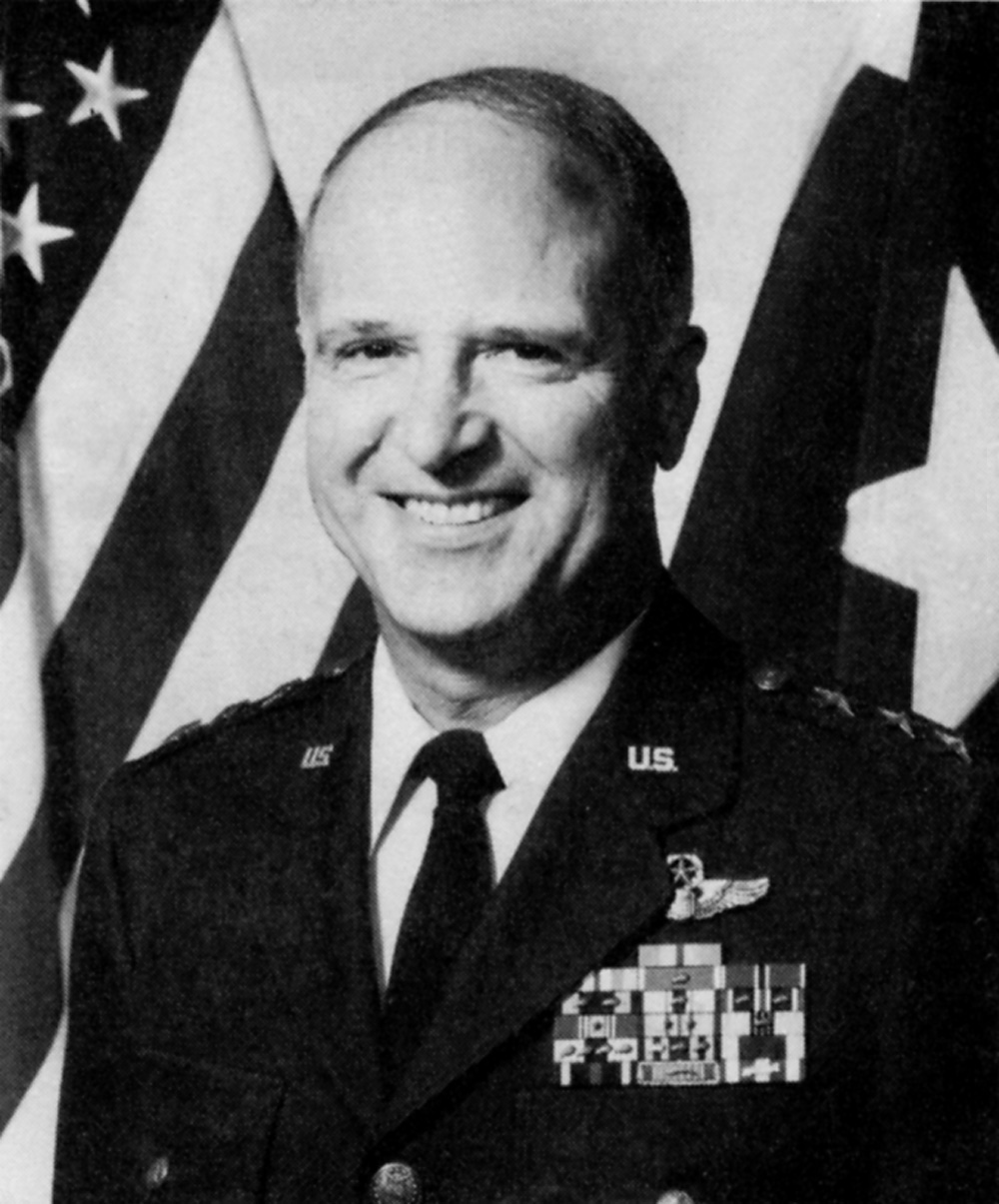
- Born: June 17, 1930; Bozeman, Montana, U.S.
- Died: October 29, 2015 (aged 85); Walter Reed National Military Medical Center, Bethesda, Maryland, U.S.
- Military career
- Allegiance: United States of America
- Branch: United States Air Force
- Service years: 1953–1988
- Rank: Lieutenant General
- Awards: Defense Distinguished Service Medal, Defense Superior Service Medal, Legion of Merit with oak leaf cluster, Bronze Star Medal, Air Medal with two oak leaf clusters, Air Force Commendation Medal with oak leaf cluster

James Robert Brown (June 17, 1930 – October 29, 2015) was a lieutenant general in the United States Air Force who served as vice commander of Tactical Air Command, with headquarters at Langley Air Force Base, Virginia. The command comprises more than 118,000 military and civilian personnel, stationed at 18 major Tactical Air Command installations and other units in the United States, Panama, Okinawa and Iceland. Tactical Air Command was the operational combat organization for 74,000 Air National Guard and Air Force Reserve personnel throughout the United States.

Brown was born in 1930 in Bozeman, Montana, and earned a bachelor of science degree in education from Montana State University in 1953. He completed Squadron Officer School in 1962, Air Command and Staff College in 1964 and the Industrial College of the Armed Forces in 1974.

He was commissioned as a second lieutenant in the Air Force in June 1953. He entered active duty in October 1953 and was assigned to the Air Force Undergraduate Pilot Training program, Class 55C, at Marana Air Force Base, Arizona. Brown received his pilot wings in November 1954 at Williams Air Force Base, Ariz. After gunnery school at Luke Air Force Base, Ariz., his first operational assignment was in April 1955 with the 20th Fighter-Bomber Wing at Royal Air Force Station Wethersfield, England, as a bomb commander and intelligence officer, flying F-84s and F-100s.

In June 1958, he transferred to Nellis Air Force Base, Nevada, for duty as a fighter gunnery and academic instructor. After serving as a member of the champion 1960 Nellis Fighter Gunnery Team as forward air controller, he was assigned to the U.S. Air Force Fighter Weapons Center in the Research and Development Section as instructor pilot and project officer, flying F-100s and F-105s. In January 1962, Brown was assigned to Tactical Air Command headquarters, Langley Air Force Base, as an F-100 flight evaluator. The following year he attended the Air Command and Staff College at Maxwell Air Force Base, Alabama.

From July 1964 to February 1966 he served as a flight commander and an F-4 instructor pilot at Davis-Monthan Air Force Base, Ariz. He then served a tour of duty in the Republic of Vietnam, with assignments at Nha Trang Air Base in the Direct Air Support Center, Tan Son Nhut Air Base in the Tactical Air Control Center, and Da Nang Air Base as a flight commander and F-4 pilot.

He returned to Davis-Monthan Air Force Base in February 1967 as the flight scheduling officer for the 4456th Combat Crew Training Squadron and then served as the director of the Training Analysis and Development Section with the 4453rd Combat Crew Training Wing. In July 1971 he transferred to Headquarters U.S. Air Force, Washington, D.C., and served as a staff action officer, Tactics Branch chief, and acting chief of the Tactical Division for the Directorate of Plans and Operations. While at Air Force headquarters, Brown was involved in the Undergraduate Pilot Training Study, the CONUS Range Study for the secretary of the Air Force, Red Flag Fighter Lead-In and Aggressor programs, and computerization of Program Flying Training for tactical fighter programs.

He transferred to Korat Royal Thai Air Force Base, Thailand, in March 1975 as deputy commander for operations, 388th Tactical Fighter Wing, a unit equipped with F-4D's, A-7D's and AC-130 gunships. During this period, the wing flew missions in support of the evacuation of Saigon and the Mayaguez operation. On Dec. 7, 1975, he led the last 388th F-4D aircraft to the United States as operations were closed out in Southeast Asia. In January 1976 he became vice commander of the 3rd Tactical Fighter Wing at Clark Air Base, Philippines. He commanded the wing's detachment during Summer Rain, a joint U.S.-Royal Australian Air Force dissimilar air-to-air combat exercise conducted in Australia during February 1976. Brown was named commander of the 3rd Tactical Fighter Wing in October 1976.

In August 1978 Brown assumed command of the 313th Air Division and 18th Tactical Fighter Wing at Kadena Air Base, Japan. While he was commander, the wing converted from F-4s to F-15 Eagles. He transferred to Ramstein Air Base, West Germany, in March 1981 and served as deputy chief of staff for operations and intelligence at Headquarters United States Air Forces in Europe. In October 1981 he became assistant chief of staff for operations, Supreme Headquarters Allied Powers in Europe, Mons, Belgium. He became commander of Allied Air Forces Southern Europe and deputy commander in chief, U.S. Air Forces in Europe for the Southern Area, Naples, Italy, in October 1984. He assumed his vice command of the Tactical Air Command in October 1986.

Brown is a command pilot with more than 5,000 flying hours. His military decorations include the Defense Distinguished Service Medal, Defense Superior Service Medal, Legion of Merit with oak leaf cluster, Bronze Star Medal, Air Medal with two oak leaf clusters, and Air Force Commendation Medal with oak leaf cluster.

He was promoted to lieutenant general November 1, 1984 and retired on July 1, 1988. Brown died at the Walter Reed Medical Center on October 29, 2015.
