= Lynwood E. Clark =

American Air Force lieutenant general (born 1929)

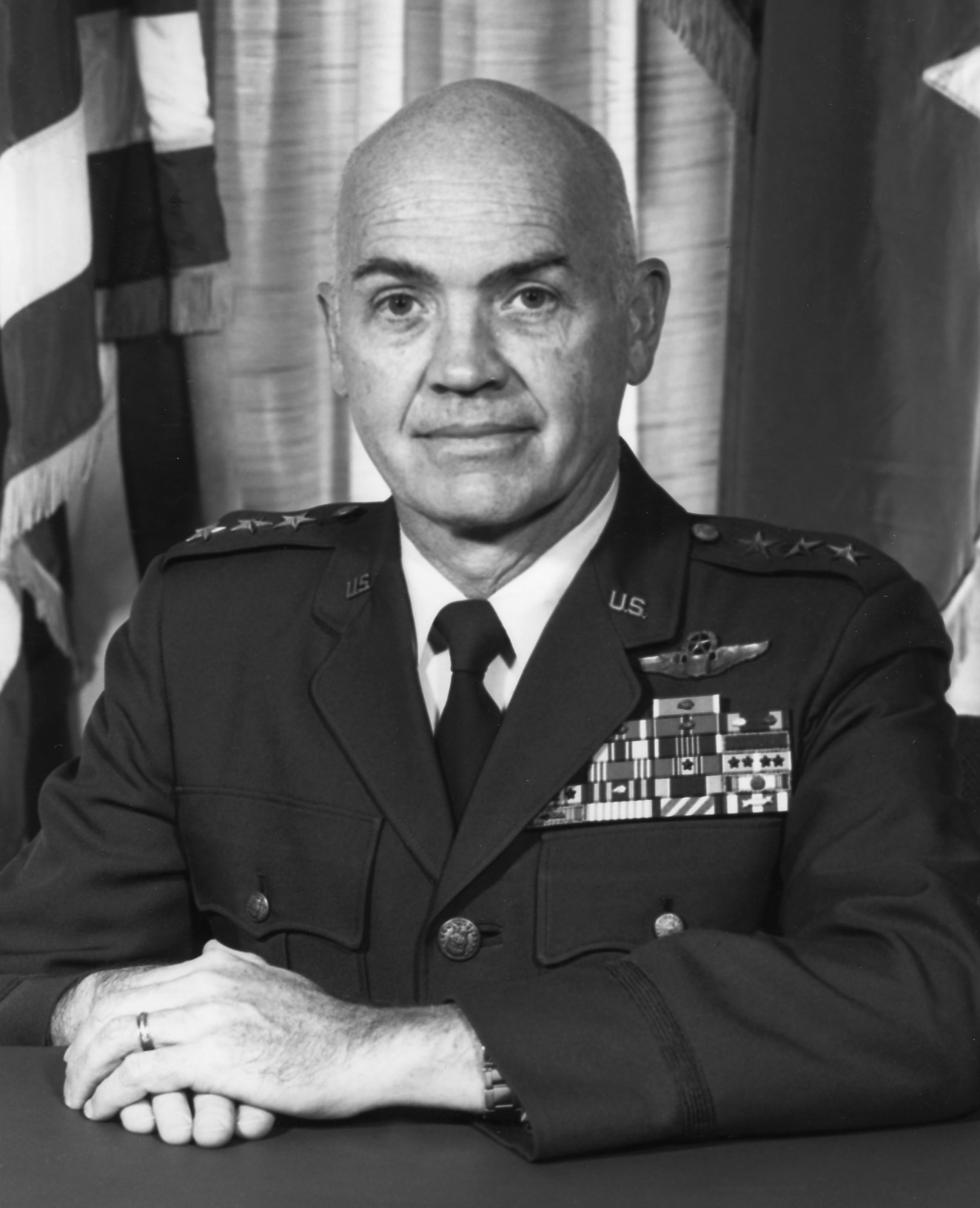
- Born: March 1, 1929 (aged 95); Delhi, New York, U.S.
- Died: August 6, 2024; Boise, Idaho
- Military career
- Allegiance: United States of America
- Branch: United States Air Force
- Service years: 1949–1983
- Rank: Lieutenant general
- Commands: Alaskan Air Command
- Awards: Distinguished Service Medal, Legion of Merit with oak leaf cluster, Distinguished Flying Cross with oak leaf cluster, Bronze Star Medal with oak leaf cluster, Air Medal with six oak leaf clusters, Air Force Commendation Medal, Army Commendation Medal and Republic of Vietnam Staff Service Honor Medal, 1st Class

Lynwood Edgerton Clark (March 1, 1929 – July 22, 2024) was an American former Air Force lieutenant general who was commander of the Alaskan Air Command, with additional duty as commander of Alaskan North American Aerospace Defense Region, Elmendorf Air Force Base, Alaska. The mission of the Alaskan Air Command is to provide top cover for America and air support in the defense of Alaska.

== Biography ==
Lynwood Edgerton Clark was born in Delhi, New York, where he graduated from Delaware Academy. He studied general engineering at Rensselaer Polytechnic Institute, and he is a graduate of the Armed Forces Staff College, Norfolk, Virginia.

Clark began his military career as an aviation cadet in November 1949 and was commissioned a second lieutenant in December 1950. From April 1951 to December 1952, during the Korean War, he was assigned as a jet fighter pilot with the Far East Air Forces in South Korea. He flew 141 combat missions in F-80s, F-84s and F-86s.

Clark then served as a fighter gunnery instructor at Tyndall Air Force Base, Florida, and Williams Air Force Base, Arizona. In February 1954 he went to Nellis Air Force Base, Nev., and served in various flying and staff assignments at wing level. Clark transferred to the 7272nd Aircraft Gunnery Group at Wheelus Air Base, Libya, in November 1957. In August 1959 he became chief of standardization and evaluation for the 50th Tactical Fighter Wing at Toul-Rosieres Air Base, France, and later moved with the wing to Hahn Air Base, Germany.

Following graduation from the Armed Forces Staff College in June 1961, he was assigned as an operations staff officer at Tactical Air Command headquarters, Langley Air Force Base, Virginia. He went to Eglin Air Force Base, Florida, in August 1964 as a fighter requirements staff officer at the U.S. Air Force Tactical Air Warfare Center.

From January 1966 to January 1967, Clark served in the Republic of Vietnam as a staff adviser to the Vietnamese air force director of operations. During that time he flew 51 combat missions and accumulated more than 100 flying hours in A-1s and 0-1s. Upon his return to the United States, he was assigned to Headquarters U.S. Air Force, Washington, D.C., as an operations officer and later became chief of Operations Review Group, Office of the Deputy Chief of Staff, Plans and Operations.

In September 1970 he became director of operations for the 27th Tactical Fighter Wing, at Cannon Air Force Base, New Mexico. He transferred to Mountain Home Air Force Base, Idaho, in May 1971, as vice commander of the 347th Tactical Fighter Wing until December when he was named commander. When the 347th was redesignated the 366th Tactical Fighter Wing in October 1972, Clark continued his duties as commander. While under his command, the 366th Tactical Fighter Wing received the Best in Air Force Award for its fuel branch, and was runner-up for the Air Force Maintenance Award.

Clark became commander of the 327th Air Division at Taipei Air Station, Taiwan, in May 1973. In July 1975 he assumed command of both the 313th Air Division and the 18th Tactical Fighter Wing at Kadena Air Base, Okinawa. He served as deputy chief of staff for logistics at Headquarters Pacific Air Forces, Hickam Air Force Base, Hawaii, from June 1976 until his assignment to the San Antonio Air Logistics Center, Kelly Air Force Base, Texas, as commander in July 1977. He assumed his present command in March 1981.

Clark is a command pilot. His military decorations and awards include the Distinguished Service Medal, Legion of Merit with oak leaf cluster, Distinguished Flying Cross with oak leaf cluster, Bronze Star Medal with oak leaf cluster, Air Medal with six oak leaf clusters, Air Force Commendation Medal, Army Commendation Medal and Republic of Vietnam Staff Service Honor Medal, 1st Class.

Clark was promoted to lieutenant general May 1, 1981, with same date of rank. He retired September 1, 1983.

During retirement, Clark and his wife moved to Eagle, Idaho, where they lived a peaceful life on a farm while Clark remained dedicated to serving his community by participating in multiple sports and church related programs.

Clark died on July 22, 2024, in Boise, Idaho.
