= Jinhae Airport =

Air base for the South Korean Navy

Coordinates: 35°08′28″N 128°41′45″E

Jinhae Air Base Jinhae Gonghang
- IATA: CHF; ICAO: RKPE

Summary
- Airport type: Military
- Owner/Operator: Republic of Korea Navy
- Location: Jinhae, South Korea
- Elevation AMSL: 8 ft / 2 m

Map

Runways
Direction	Length		Surface
Direction	m	ft	Surface
18/36	1,148	3,766	Asphalt
- Source: DAFIF

Jinhae Air Base (IATA: CHF, ICAO: RKPE) also known as Chinhae Air Base is a naval airfield of the Republic of Korea Navy in Jinhae, South Korea.

== History ==
The airfield was originally established in 1942 as the 51st Navy Aircraft Factory (formerly 21st Navy Aircraft Factory Jinhae Branch) under the Chinkai Guard District, which was a major navy base for the Imperial Japanese Navy in Korea under Japanese rule. The Republic of Korea Marine Corps (ROKMC) was founded at the airfield (then known as Deoksan airfield) on April 15, 1949.

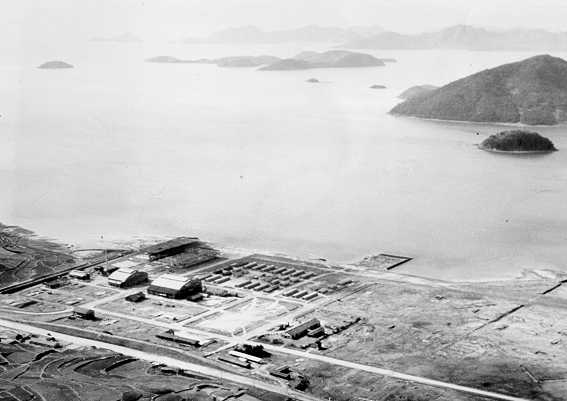
Aerial view of Deoksan airfield (present-day Jinhae naval airfield) circa 1950

=== Korean War ===
During the Korean War the USAF designated the airfield as Chinhae Air Base and K-10 Chinhae. The field was refurbished with a Marsden Matting surface over crushed gravel.

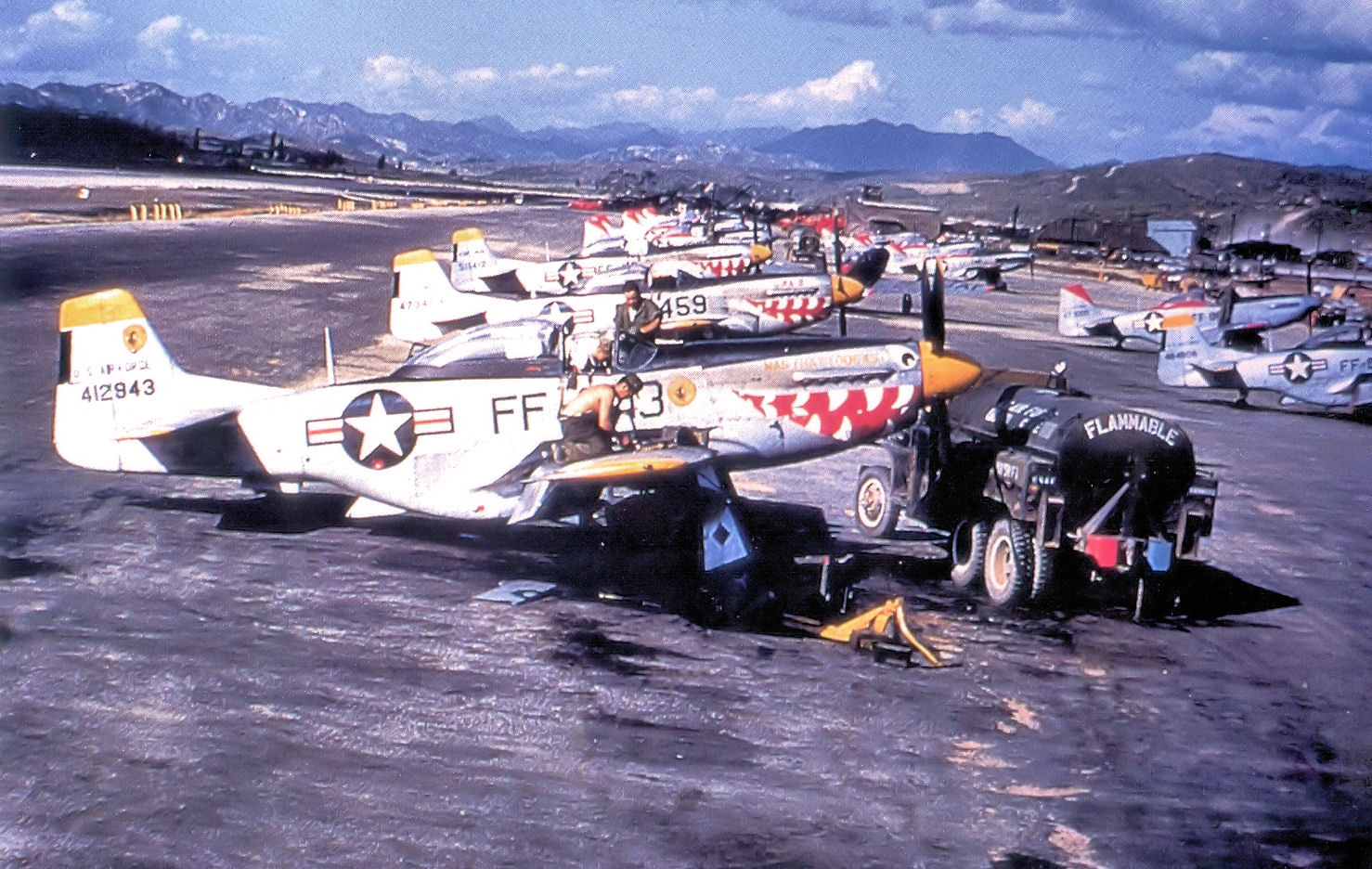
18th Fighter-Bomber Wing F-51s at Chinhae in 1951

USAF units stationed at Chinhae included:

- 18th Operations Group from 9 December 1950 – 2 June 1952
- 18th Fighter-Bomber Wing operating F-51s from mid December 1950 Component units were:
  - 12th Fighter-Bomber Squadron
  - 67th Fighter-Bomber Squadron
  - 39th Fighter-Interceptor Squadron (March 1951 – March 1952)
- 75th Air Depot Wing (arrived from U.S. in 1952)

UN units stationed at Chinhae included:

- 2 Squadron SAAF operating F-51s attached to the 18th Fighter-Bomber Wing (November 1950 – March 1951, April 1951 – June 1953)

==== Incidents and accidents ====
- 24 August 1950, USAF C-47B #45-1126 was written off in a landing accident.
- 17 May 1951, F-51D #44-74822 crashed on landing, the aircraft was written off.
- 8 July 1951, USAF C-47D #44-77269 crashed on takeoff due to an engine failure, the aircraft was written off.
- 11 July 1951, F-51D #44-74495 crashed, the aircraft was written off.
- 17 September 1951, F-51D #44-74014 crashed on landing, the aircraft was written off.
- 8 October 1951, F-51D #44-74592 crashed on takeoff, the aircraft was written off.

== Airlines and destinations ==
No scheduled services.
