= William T. Hobbins =

United States Air Force general

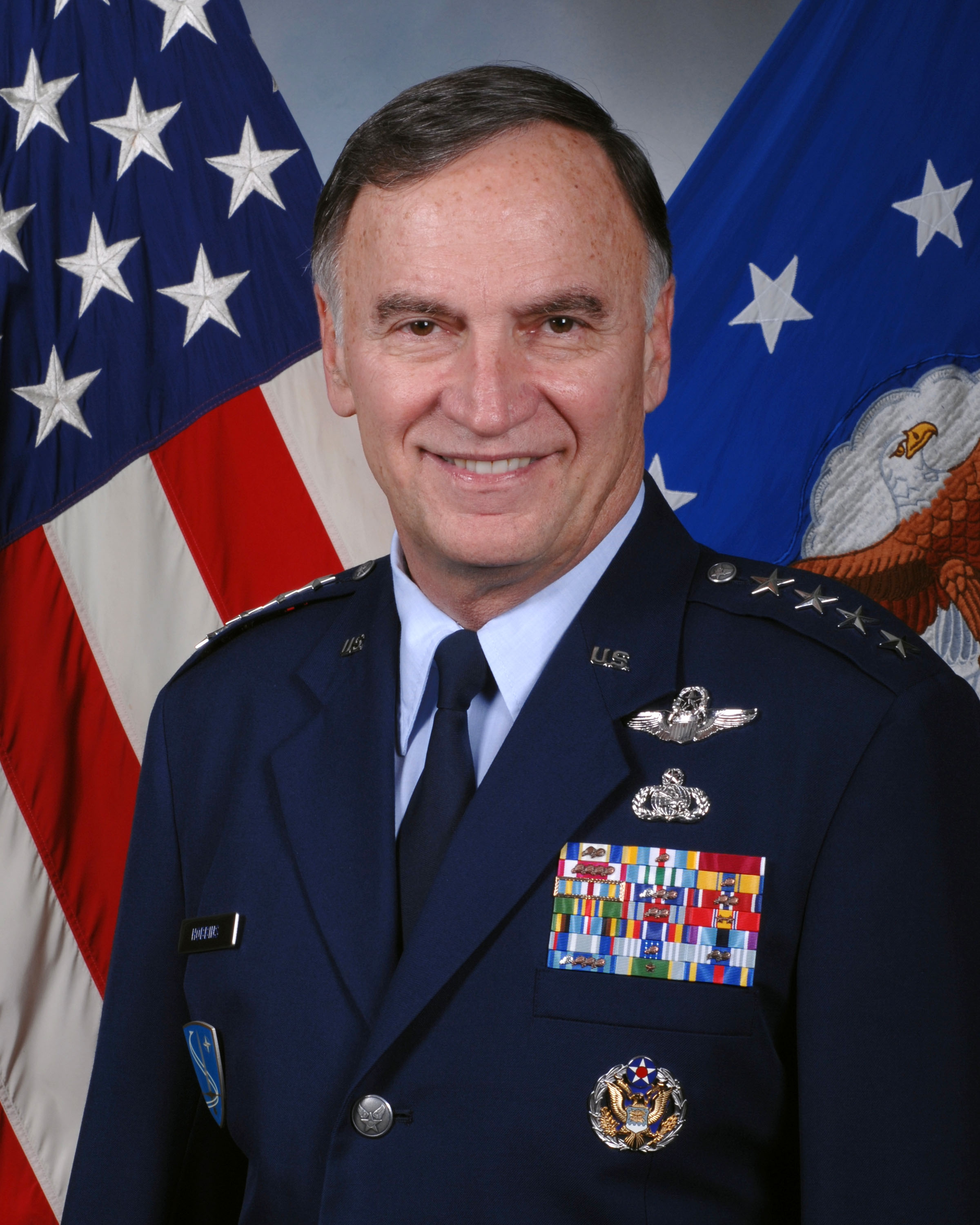
- General William T. Hobbins
- Born: February 18, 1946 (age 80)
- Military career
- Allegiance: United States of America
- Branch: United States Air Force
- Service years: 1969—2008
- Rank: General
- Commands: U.S. Air Forces Europe; 12th Air Force
- Awards: Legion of Merit; Order of the Rising Sun

William Thomas Hobbins (born February 18, 1946) is a former Air Force general, commander of U.S. Air Forces Europe; commander of Air Component Command, Ramstein; and director of Joint Air Power Competence Center, Kalkar, Germany.

Hobbins was raised in Ephrata, Pennsylvania, and entered the Air Force in December 1969 as a graduate of Officer Training School. He has commanded two tactical fighter wings and a composite air group. He has served as the director of plans and operations for U.S. Forces Japan, director of plans and policy for U.S. Atlantic Command, and the director of operations for U.S. Air Forces in Europe. As the USAFE director of operations, General Hobbins was responsible for the planning, bedding down and execution of combat forces in Europe for Operation Allied Force.

Whilst serving as commander of Air Forces Iceland, Hobbins led the composite wing in the intercept of 80 Soviet bomber aircraft in nine months. During his tenure as Twelfth Air Force commander, General Hobbins deployed the Twelfth Air Force's Air Operations Center to Southwest Asia as operations Enduring Freedom and Iraqi Freedom's alternate AOC prior to the beginning of the hostilities.

A command pilot, as of August 2007 the general has more than 5,000 flying hours, primarily in fighter aircraft.

General Hobbins also stars in a number of Armed Forces Network commercials.

== Education ==
- 1969 Bachelor of Science degree in business finance, University of Colorado
- 1976 Squadron Officer School, Maxwell AFB, Alabama
- 1977 Master's degree in business administration, Troy State University
- 1981 Armed Forces Staff College, Norfolk, Virginia
- 1985 Air War College, Maxwell AFB, Alabama
- 1997 Joint Flag Officer Warfighting Course, Maxwell AFB, Alabama
- 1999 Joint Force Air Component Commander Course, Maxwell AFB, Alabama
- 2000 National Security Leadership Course, Syracuse University, New York
- 2005 Leadership at the Peak, Center for Creative Leadership, Colorado Springs, Colorado

== Assignments ==
- January 1970 - December 1970, student, undergraduate pilot training, Laredo AFB, Texas
- December 1970 - March 1973, T-28 instructor pilot, 3389th Pilot Training Squadron, Keesler AFB, Mississippi
- March 1973 - May 1974, T-38 instructor pilot and class commander, 29th Flying Training Wing, Craig AFB, Alabama
- May 1974 - May 1975, AT-28 fighter pilot and chief of quality control, Detachment 19, 1131st Special Activity Squadron, Udon Royal Thai AFB, Thailand
- May 1975 - October 1977, chief of T-38 Standardization and Evaluation Division, 29th Flying Training Wing, Craig AFB, Alabama
- October 1977 - July 1980, F-15 flight commander, instructor pilot, operations officer, and chief of Wing Scheduling Division, 7th Tactical Fighter Squadron and 49th Tactical Fighter Wing, Holloman AFB, New Mexico
- August 1980 - January 1981, student, Armed Forces Staff College, Norfolk, Virginia
- January 1981 - July 1984, F-15 operations monitor, F-5 Program Element Monitor, and chief of Weapon Systems Branch, Tactical Division, Directorate of Operations, Headquarters U.S. Air Force, Washington, D.C.
- August 1984 - May 1985, student, Air War College, Maxwell AFB, Alabama
- May 1985 - April 1987, chief of wing inspections, 33d Tactical Fighter Wing, Eglin AFB, Florida
- April 1987 - June 1988, deputy commander of operations, 12th Flying Training Wing, Randolph AFB, Texas
- June 1988 - July 1990, vice commander, later, commander of Air Forces Iceland, Keflavik Naval Air Station, Iceland
- July 1990 - September 1991, vice commander, later commander, of 405th Tactical Training Wing, Luke AFB, Arizona
- September 1991 - June 1992, vice commander of 58th Fighter Wing, Luke AFB, Arizona
- July 1992 - July 1994, director of plans and operations, U.S. Forces Japan, Yokota Air Base, Japan
- August 1994 - July 1996, commander of 18th Wing, Kadena AB, Japan
- August 1996 - April 1998, director of plans and policy, U.S. Atlantic Command, Norfolk, Virginia
- April 1998 - July 2000, director of aerospace operations, Headquarters USAFE, Ramstein AB, Germany
- August 2000 - September 2002, commander of Twelfth Air Force and U.S. Southern Command Air Forces, and Air Force Component commander, U.S. Strategic Command, Davis-Monthan AFB, Arizona
- October 2002 - August 2003, commander of Twelfth Air Force and U.S. Southern Command Air Forces, Davis-Monthan AFB, Arizona
- August 2003 - May 2005, Deputy Chief of Staff for Warfighting Integration, Headquarters U.S. Air Force, Washington, D.C.
- May 2005 - November 2005, deputy chief of staff for warfighting integration, Headquarters U.S. Air Force, and acting chief of warfighting integration and chief information officer, Office of the Secretary of the Air Force, Washington, D.C.
- December 2005 - December 2007, commander of U.S. Air Forces Europe; commander of Air Component Command, Ramstein; and director of Joint Air Power Competence Center, Kalkar, Germany

== Flight information ==
- Rating: Command pilot
- Flight hours: More than 4,440
- Aircraft flown: F-15C, F-15E, C-20, A-10, AT-28 and T-38 Talon

== Awards and decorations ==
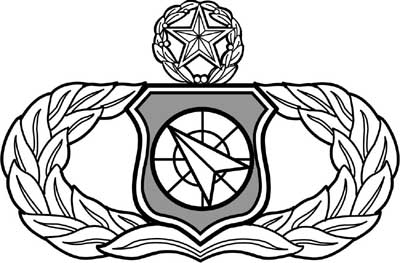
US Air Force Command Pilot Badge
Master Air Force Communications and Information Badge
Headquarters Air Force Badge
Allied Air Command Badge

Defense Distinguished Service Medal
Air Force Distinguished Service Medal with two bronze oak leaf clusters
Defense Superior Service Medal with oak leaf cluster
Legion of Merit with oak leaf cluster
Meritorious Service Medal with four oak leaf clusters
Joint Service Commendation Medal
Air Force Commendation Medal with oak leaf cluster
Joint Meritorious Unit Award
Navy Meritorious Unit Commendation
Air Force Outstanding Unit Award with silver and two bronze oak leaf clusters
Air Force Organizational Excellence Award with two oak leaf clusters
Combat Readiness Medal with two oak leaf clusters
National Defense Service Medal with two bronze service stars
Armed Forces Expeditionary Medal
Global War on Terrorism Service Medal
Humanitarian Service Medal
Air and Space Campaign Medal
Air Force Overseas Short Tour Service Ribbon with oak leaf cluster
Air Force Overseas Long Tour Service Ribbon with two oak leaf clusters
Air Force Longevity Service Award with silver and three bronze oak leaf clusters
Small Arms Expert Marksmanship Ribbon with service star
Air Force Training Ribbon

- Order of the Rising Sun with Gold Rays
- Mérito Aeronáutico en el grado de Comendador (Bolivian Armed Forces Order of Aeronautical Merit in the grade of "Commander")
- Estrella de las Fuerzas Armadas en el Grando de Estrella al Mérito Militar, Ecuador (Star of the Armed Forces in the grade of Star of Military Merit)
- Medalla al Mérito Aeronáutico, Uruguay (Aeronautical Merit)
- Medalla al Mérito 1 Clase, Honduras
- Cruz al Mérito Aeronáutico, Chile (Meritorious Air Cross Medal)
- Cruz de la Fuerza Aérea, Guatemala (Air Force Cross)
- Legion al Mérito Confraternidad Aérea Interamericana (Legion of Merit, System of Cooperation Among the American Air Forces)
- Cruz de la Fuerza Aérea al Mérito Aeronáutica (Colombian Air Force Cross, Aeronautical Merit)
- Orden de Mayo al Merito Aeronautico en el grado de Gran Cruz (Argentine Air Force Cross)
- NATO Meritorious Service Medal
- Pilot wings from Cambodia
- Pilot wings from Vietnam
- 1976 Instructor Pilot of the Year
- Air Force Association Citation
- 2007 Order of the Sword, USAFE

== Promotion dates ==
- Second lieutenant December 22, 1969
- First lieutenant June 22, 1971
- Captain February 1, 1973
- Major September 1, 1979
- Lieutenant colonel December 1, 1982
- Colonel April 1, 1988
- Brigadier general July 15, 1994
- Major general October 1, 1996
- Lieutenant general October 1, 2000
- General February 1, 2006

== See also ==
- List of commanders of USAFE
