= 12th Special Operations Squadron =

12th Special Operations Squadron

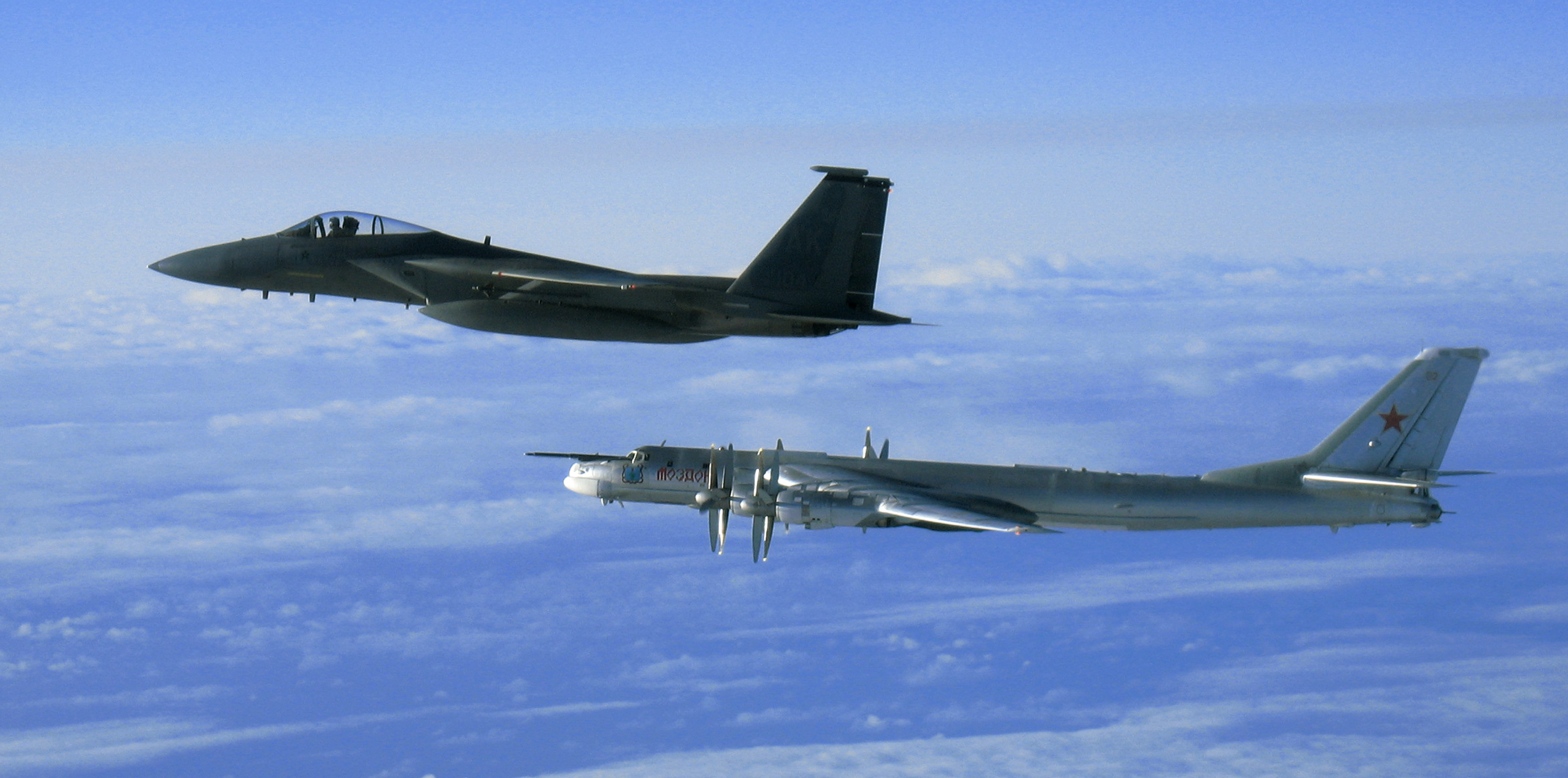
- 12th Fighter Squadron F-15C Eagle and a Russian Tupolev Tu-95 Bear bomber (Note: Taken 28 September 2006 during a Russian exercise that brought the Tupolev Tu-95MS Bear near the west coast of Alaska.)
- Active: 1941–2007; 2015–present
- Country: United States
- Branch: United States Air Force
- Role: Special operations
- Part of: Air Force Special Operations Command
- Garrison/HQ: Cannon Air Force Base
- Nickname: Dirty Dozen (World War II)
- Mottos: In Omnia Paratus (Latin); Ready for Anything (1957-present)
- Engagements: Southwest Pacific Theater; Korean War; Vietnam War
- Decorations: Distinguished Unit Citation; Presidential Unit Citation; Air Force Outstanding Unit Award with Combat V device Air Force Outstanding unit Award; Philippine Presidential Unit Citation; Korean Presidential Unit Citation; Republic of Vietnam Gallantry Cross with Palm

Commanders
- Current commander: Lt Col Joshua E. Swann

Insignia
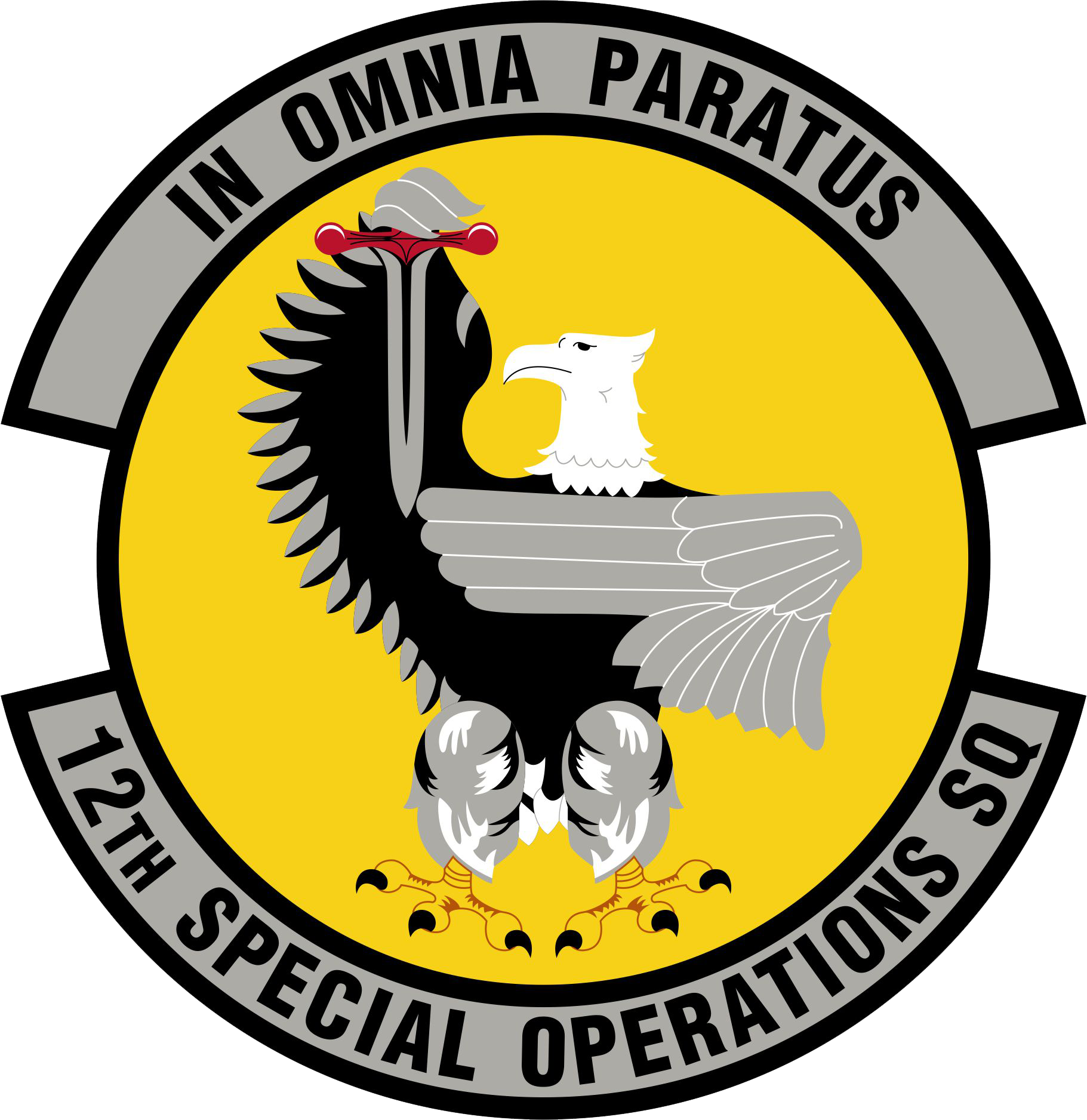
- 12th Special Operations Squadron emblem (Note: Approved 15 April 1957, modified 1 October 2018.)

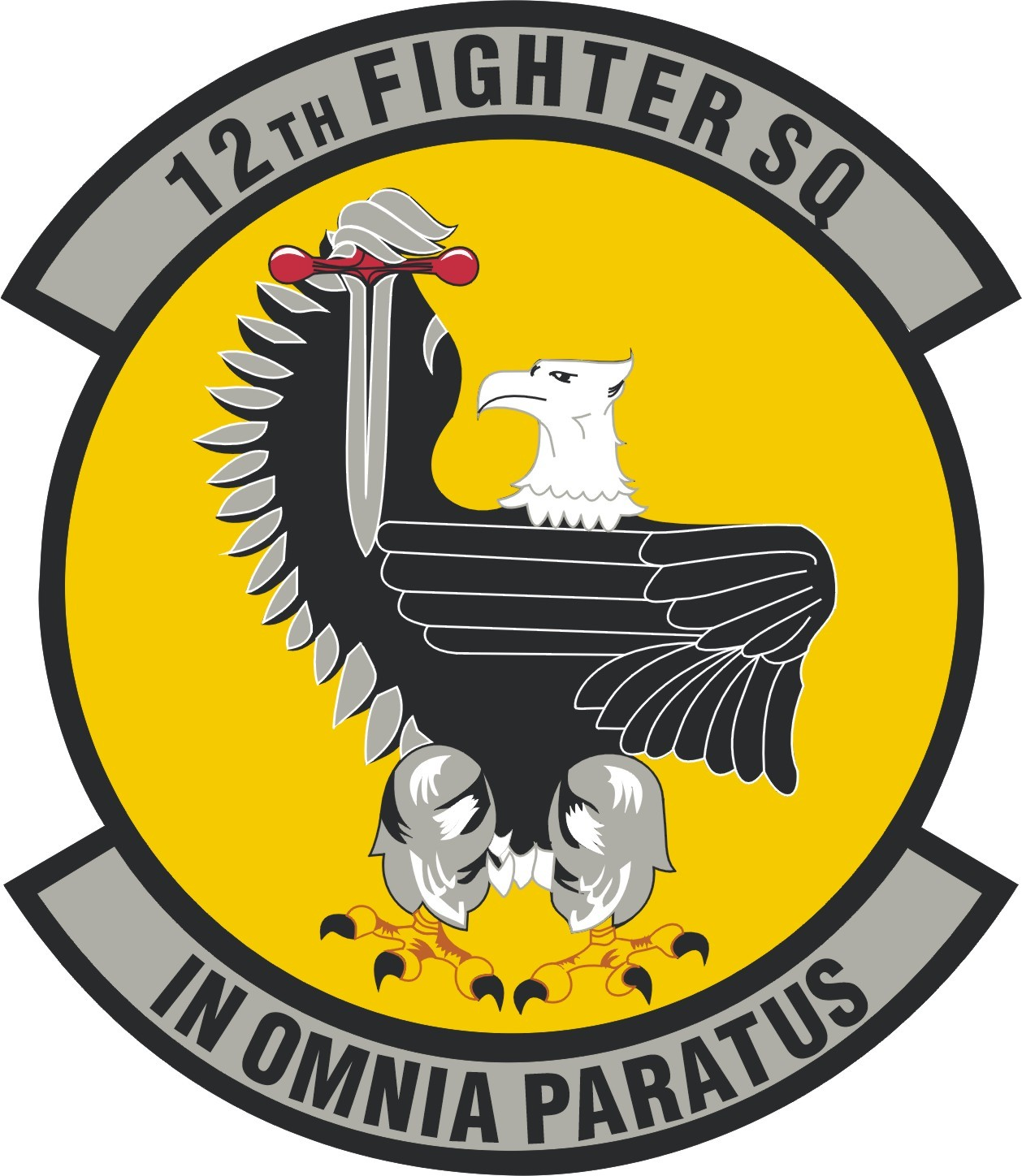
- 12th Fighter Squadron emblem (Note: Approved 15 April 1957.)

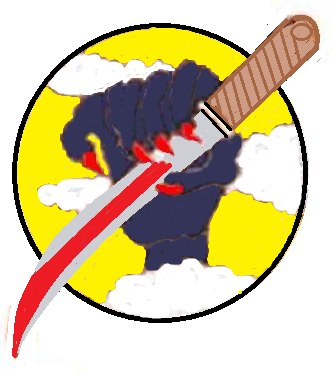
- 12th Fighter Squadron emblem (World War II)

The 12th Special Operations Squadron is assigned to the 27th Special Operations Group at Cannon Air Force Base, New Mexico. Its mission is the launch and recovery of MQ-9 Reaper Remotely Piloted Aircraft from unprepared locations throughout the world. The squadron was activated in 2015 to replace a detachment that had been performing the same mission since October 2013.

The squadron was previously active at Elmendorf Air Force Base, Alaska as the 12th Fighter Squadron, part of the 3d Operations Group. The squadron operated the McDonnell Douglas F-15 Eagle aircraft conducting air superiority missions.

The mission of the 12th is to launch and recover Remotely Piloted Aircraft (RPA) operationally employed by the 2d, 3d and 33d Special Operations Squadrons. To avoid the inherent delay in transmitting commands through satellite communications to RPAs from distant stations, the squadron deploys to locations where it can operate the craft for takeoff and landing using line of sight signals. This minimizes risk during critical flight operations, while permitting mission operations to be performed from more remote secure locations.

== History ==
=== World War II ===
The 12th Special Operations Squadron was first activated at Selfridge Field, Michigan as the 12th Pursuit Squadron, one of the original squadrons of the 50th Pursuit Group. in January 1941 when the United States expanded its military forces on the eve of World War II. After training with Seversky P-35s and Curtiss P-36 Hawks, the squadron moved with its parent 50th Pursuit Group to Key Field, Mississippi in October, where it began to equip with Curtiss P-40 Warhawks. It was located there when the Japanese attacked Pearl Harbor on 8 December.

Responding to the critical need for fighters in the Pacific, in February 1942 the squadron deployed to Christmas Island. The 12th flew patrols over the Indian Ocean from Christmas Island between February and October 1942. During this time the squadron was equipped with P-39 and P-400 aircraft. It began combat operations from Fighter Strip No.2 on Guadalcanal on 19 November 1942, moving to Guadalcanal in February. The squadron was subsequently equipped with P-38 Lightning aircraft at this time. The squadron participated in Operation Vengeance, the successful operation to kill Admiral Isoroku Yamamoto of the Imperial Japanese Navy on 18 April 1943. Operations during this time were frequently split. Although based on Guadalcanal until August 1944, flight operations were conducted from Mono Airfield on Stirling Island. The 12th moved to Mar Drome, Sansapor, Netherlands East Indies that month although starting on 8 November, a portion of the squadron operated from Morotai. The split operation lasted until 10 January 1945, and three days later the squadron moved to Lingayen Airfield in the Philippines, although the squadron moved to Hill Strip little more than a week later, its rear echelon continued to operate from Lingayen until 24 April 1945, when it leapfrogged forward to become the advanced echelon at Moret Field on 24 April, being joined by the rest of the squadron on 4 May. Combat operations continued until 14 August 1945 from Moret (and from Puerto Princesa Airfield between 26 April and 11 May 1945).

Following the surrender of Japan, the squadron remained in the Philippines.

=== Korean War ===
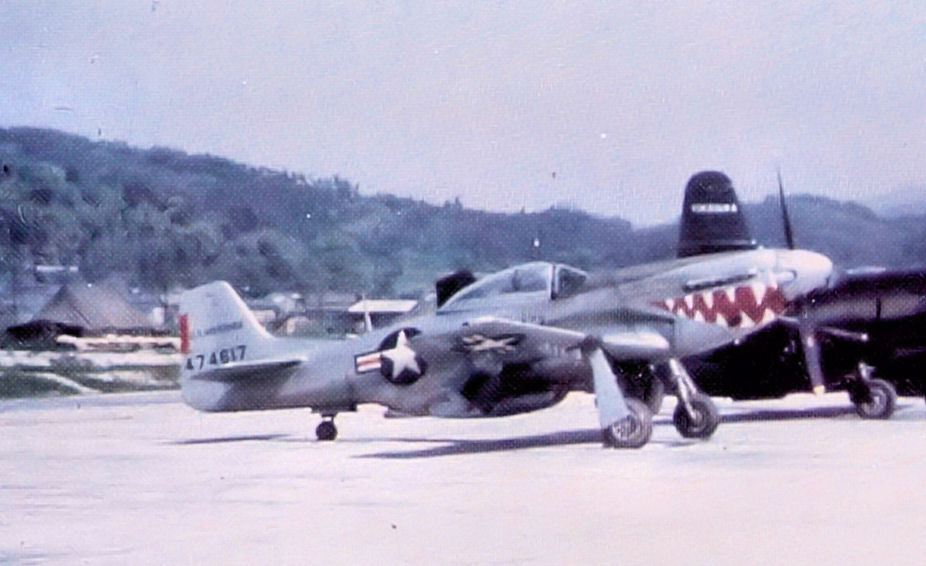
12th Fighter-Bomber Squadron P-51D (Note: Aircraft is North American P-51D-30-NA Mustang serial 44-74617, taken on a South Korean airfield in 1950.)

When the North Korean People's Army crossed the 38th parallel to invade South Korea in June 1950, Far East Air Forces looked to its resources in the Philippines to reinforce its forces in Korea and the squadron was moved from the Philippines to Taegu Air Base in late July. However, as United Nations forces withdrew into the Pusan Perimeter, the squadron was forced to move to Ashiya Air Base, Japan eleven days after arriving in the theater of war, after flying only a handful of missions from Taegu with North American P-51 Mustangs. The following month it returned to Korea and Pusan East (K-9) Air Base.

After the Inchon Landings, United Nations forces rapidly moved north and the squadron was able to establish a detachment at Pyongyang East Air Base on 5 November 1950, with the entire squadron arriving just over two weeks later. However, Chinese intervention in Korea forced the squadron to withdraw in December, first to Suwon Air Base, then to Chinhae Air Base (although a detachment of the squadron continued to operate from Suwon until 4 January 1951). Part of the squadron resumed Suwon operations again on 24 March 1951, while another part flew out of Pusan West Air Base Suwon operations lasted until 4 May 1951, while those in Pusan lasted only until 23 April.

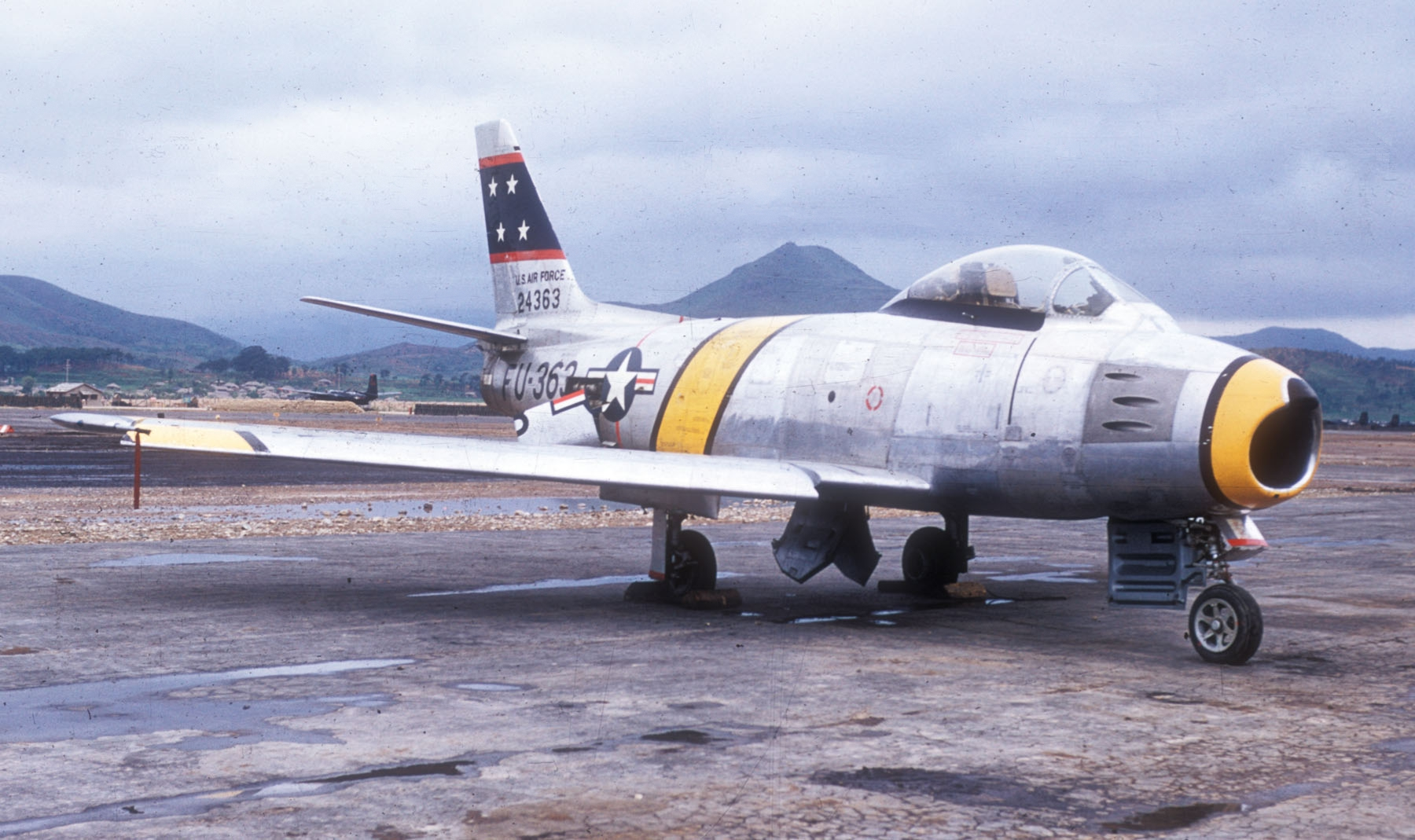
12th Fighter-Bomber Squadron F-86F at Taegu

Although still stationed at Chinhae, The squadron operated from Seoul Air Base, closer to the front lines, from 8 May to 9 August 1951 and again from 18 August until 30 September, after which it began operations at Hoengseong Air Base. It moved entirely to Hoengseong on 2 June 1952.

It continued to fly combat missions in Korea from until 8 January 1953 and again, after re-equipping with the North American F-86 Sabre, from 25 February to 27 July 1953.

The 12th Fighter-Bomber Squadron Deployed to Tainan Air Base, Taiwan from 27 January – 19 February 1955, 3 September – 30 November 1955, from 18 – 25 April 1961, 18th Tactical Fighter Wing deployed a detachment of 12th Tactical Fighter Squadron aircraft to Kung Kuan Air Base.

=== Vietnam War ===
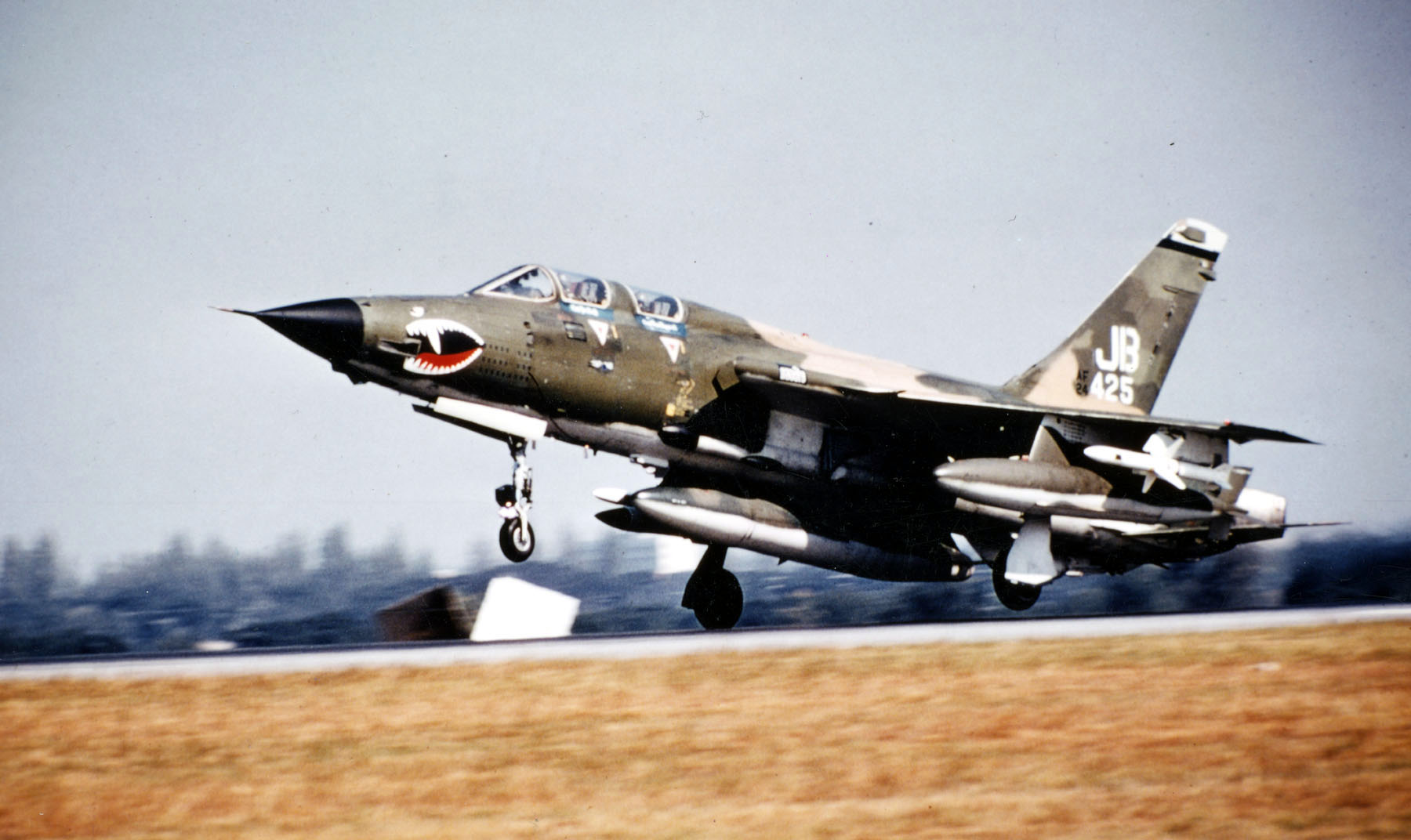
An F-105G taking off from Korat, 1972.

The 12th deployed to South Vietnam twice in 1965, first from 1 February to March 1965 and 15 June to 25 August 1965. It supported air defense alert capability in Southeast Asia between 1968 and 1972.

The squadron stood alert in South Korea from 23 January to 13 June 1968, after the seizure of the USS Pueblo by North Korea.

=== Operations in the Pacific ===
The squadron was unmanned and unequipped from May 1972 until November 1975. It remanned and reequipped with McDonnell F-4 Phantom II aircraft in late November 1975. Through 1980, it flew offensive and defensive exercises in support of its wing, the 313th Air Division, and Pacific Air Forces. It converted to McDonnell Douglas F-15 Eagle aircraft in 1980. In 1981, the 12th earned the Hughes Trophy in recognition as the outstanding fighter squadron in the USAF.

On 5 November 1999, the squadron moved without personnel or equipment to Elmendorf Air Force Base, Alaska where it joined the 3d Wing on 28 April 2000. Between 2000 and 2008, it performed offensive and defensive counter-air missions with current air-to-air weaponry, including night vision goggles (NVG), to achieve air superiority in support of taskings from 3 Wing.

At Elmendorf Air Force Base, the squadron employed the F-15C air superiority fighter in global expeditionary support of war-fighting commands. The squadron was inactivated in September 2006, due to the Base Realignment and Closure of 2005.

=== Remotely piloted vehicles ===
The 12th was redesignated the 12th Special Operations Squadron and activated at Cannon Air Force Base, New Mexico to operate RPVs from forward deployed locations during critical flight maneuvers when operating the craft by transmitting signals through satellites could potentially endanger them due to the delay in signal transmission. It absorbed the personnel and equipment of a small detachment that had been performing the same mission at Cannon since October 2013. The squadron is the first of its kind in the United States Air Force, and was considered as a model for similar units by Air Combat Command. Later, the 414th Expeditionary Reconnaissance Squadron was activated to carry out the same type of mission from Incirlik Air Base in Turkey.

== Lineage ==
- Constituted as the 12th Pursuit Squadron (Interceptor) on 20 November 1940

Activated on 15 January 1941
Redesignated 12th Fighter Squadron on 15 May 1942
Redesignated 12th Fighter Squadron, Two Engine on 26 January 1944
Redesignated 12th Fighter Squadron, Single Engine on 6 May 1946
Redesignated 12th Fighter Squadron, Jet on 23 December 1949
Redesignated 12th Fighter-Bomber Squadron on 20 January 1950
Redesignated 12th Tactical Fighter Squadron on 1 July 1958
Redesignated 12th Fighter Squadron on 1 October 1991
Inactivated in October 2007

- Redesignated 12th Special Operations Squadron on 10 February 2015

Activated on 12 February 2015

=== Assignments ===
- 50th Pursuit Group (later 50th Fighter Group), 15 January 1941 (attached to 7th Interceptor Command (later VII Fighter Command, 10 February – 17 August 1942
- 15th Fighter Group, 18 August 1942
- US Army Forces in South Pacific, 1 December 1942
- XIII Fighter Command, 13 January 1943
- 18th Fighter Group (later 18th Fighter-Bomber Group), 30 March 1943

Attached to:

Air Task Group 5, Provisional, 27 January – 19 February 1955,
Air Task Force 13, Provisional, c. 3 September – 30 November 1955
49th Fighter-Bomber Group, 7 August 1956 – 14 March 1957
18th Fighter-Bomber Wing, 15 March – 15 August 1957
Thirteenth Air Force, 16 August – 1 September 1957

- Thirteenth Air Force, 2 September 1957
- 18 Fighter-Bomber Wing (later 18th Tactical Fighter Wing), 25 March 1958

Attached to

2d Air Division, 1 February – 15 March 1965, 15 June – 25 August 1965
314th Air Division, 23 – 29 January 1968

- 18th Tactical Fighter Group, 1 May 1978
- 18th Tactical Fighter Wing, 11 February 1981
- 18th Operations Group, 1 October 1991
- 3d Operations Group, 28 April 2000 – October 2007
- 27th Special Operations Group, 12 February 2015 – present

=== Stations ===
- Selfridge Field, Michigan, 15 January 1941
- Key Field, Mississippi, 3 October 1941
- Cassidy Airport, Christmas Island, Line Islands, 10 February 1942
- Palmyra Atoll Airfield, Line Islands, 22 October 1942
- Efate Airfield, New Hebrides, 19 November 1942
- Fighter Strip No. 2 (later Kukum Field), Guadalcanal, Solomon Islands, 7 February 1943
- Mar Drome, Sansapor, Netherlands East Indies, 23 August 1944
- Lingayen Airfield, Luzon, Philippines, 13 January 1945
- Hill Strip, San Jose, Mindoro, Philippines, 25 January 1945
- Moret Field, San Roque, Mindanao, Philippines, 4 May 1945 (Note: Detachments operated from Sanga-Sanga in the Sulu Archipelago from 11 June 1945 until the end of the war and from Tacloban from 25 July – c. 30 July 1945.)
- Tacloban Airfield, Leyte, Philippines, 5 November 1945
- Puerto Princesa Airfield, Palawan, Philippines, 15 February 1946 (Note: A detachment operated from Floridablanca Army Air Base after 24 June 1946.)
- Floridablanca Army Air Base, Luzon, Philippines, 17 July 1946
- Clark Field (later Clark Air Base), Luzon, Philippines, 16 September 1947 (operated from Johnson Field, Japan 28 June – 11 July 1949)
- Taegu Air Base (K-2), South Korea, 28 July 1950
- Ashiya Air Base, Japan, 8 August 1950
- Pusan East (K-9) Air Base (K-9), South Korea, 8 September 1950 (a detachment operated from Pyongyang East Air Base after 5 November 1950)
- Pyongyang East Air Base (K-24), North Korea, 20 November 1950
- Suwon Air Base (K-13), South Korea, 3 December 1950
- Chinhae Air Base (K-10), South Korea, 22 December 1950
- Hoengseong Air Base (K-46), South Korea, 2 June 1952
- Osan-ni Air Base (later Osan Air Base) (K-55), South Korea, 11 January 1953
- Kadena Air Base, Okinawa, Japan, 30 October 1954 (operated from Yonton Auxiliary Air Base 10 November – 11 December 1954)

Deployed to Tainan Air Base, Taiwan, 27 January – 19 February 1955, c. 3 September – 30 November 1955

- Clark Air Base, Luzon, Philippines, 15 August 1957 (detachment operated from Clark starting on 1 August 1957)
- Kadena Air Base, Okinawa, Japan25 March 1958

Deployed to:

Kung Kuan Air Base, Taiwan, 18 – 25 April 1961
Da Nang Air Base, South Vietnam, 1 – 19 February 1965
Korat Royal Thai Air Force Base, Thailand, 8 February – 15 March 1965, 15 June – 25 August 1965
Osan Air Base, South Korea, 23 January – 13 June 196

- Elmendorf Air Force Base, Alaska, 20 April 2000 – 30 September 2007
- Cannon Air Force Base, New Mexico, 12 February 2015 – present

=== Aircraft ===
- Seversky P-35 (1941)
- Curtiss P-36 Hawk (1941)
- BT-13 Valiant (1941)
- Curtiss P-40 Warhawk (1941–1942)
- Bell P-39 Airacobra (1942–1943, 1944)
- Bell P-400 (1942–1944)
- Lockheed P-38 Lightning (1943–1946)
- Republic P-47 Thunderbolt (1944, 1946, 1947–1948)
- North American P-51 Mustang (1946–1947, 1948–1950, 1950–1953)
- Lockheed P-80 Shooting Star (1946, 1949–1950)
- North American F-86 Sabre (1953–1956)
- Republic F-84 Thunderjet (1956–1957)
- North American F-100 Super Sabre (1957–1958, 1958–1963)
- Republic F-105 Thunderchief (1962–1972)
- McDonnell F-4 Phantom II (1975–1980)
- McDonnell Douglas F-15 Eagle (1980–2008)
- MQ-1 (2015)
- MQ-9 (2015–present)

=== Awards and campaigns ===
Award streamer	Award	Dates	Notes
	Distinguished Unit Citation	Philippine Islands, 10 November 1944 – 11 November 1944	12th Fighter Squadron
	Distinguished Unit Citation	Korea, 3 November 1950 – 24 January 1951	12th Fighter-Bomber Squadron
	Distinguished Unit Citation	Korea, 22 April 1951 – 8 July 1951	12th Fighter-Bomber Squadron
	Presidential Unit Citation	25 June 1965 – 25 August 1965	Southeast Asia, 12th Tactical Fighter Squadron
	Air Force Outstanding Unit Award w/Combat "V" Device	1 August 1964 – 5 June 1965	12th Tactical Fighter Squadron
	Air Force Outstanding Unit Award	1 December 1959 – 30 November 1960	12th Tactical Fighter Squadron
	Air Force Outstanding Unit Award	1 September 1962 – 31 August 1963	12th Tactical Fighter Squadron
	Air Force Outstanding Unit Award	6 June 1965 – 31 December 1966	12th Tactical Fighter Squadron
	Air Force Outstanding Unit Award	1 September 1978 – 30 September 1979	12th Tactical Fighter Squadron
	Air Force Outstanding Unit Award	1 October 1979 – 31 May 1980	12th Tactical Fighter Squadron
	Air Force Outstanding Unit Award	1 June 1981 – 31 May 1983	12th Tactical Fighter Squadron
	Air Force Outstanding Unit Award	1 June 1983 – 31 May 1984	12th Tactical Fighter Squadron
	Air Force Outstanding Unit Award	1 June 1984 – 31 May 1986	12th Tactical Fighter Squadron
	Air Force Outstanding Unit Award	1 June 1987 – 31 May 1989	12th Tactical Fighter Squadron
	Air Force Outstanding Unit Award	1 June 1989 – 31 May 1991	12th Tactical Fighter Squadron
	Air Force Outstanding Unit Award	1 June 1991 – 31 May 1993	12th Tactical Fighter Squadron (later 12th Fighter Squadron)
	Air Force Outstanding Unit Award	1 June 1993 – 31 August 1994	12th Tactical Fighter Squadron
	Air Force Outstanding Unit Award	1 September 1994 – 31 August 1995	12th Tactical Fighter Squadron
	Air Force Outstanding Unit Award	1 September 1995 – 31 August 1997	12th Fighter Squadron
	Air Force Outstanding Unit Award	1 January 2000 – 31 December 2001	12th Fighter Squadron
	Air Force Outstanding Unit Award	1 January 2002 – 30 September 2003	12th Fighter Squadron
	Air Force Outstanding Unit Award	1 October 2003 – 30 September 2005	12th Fighter Squadron
	Philippine Republic Presidential Unit Citation	13 January 1945 – 4 July 1945	12th Fighter Squadron
	Korean Presidential Unit Citation	[28] July 1950 – 31 January 1951	12th Fighter-Bomber Squadron
	Korean Presidential Unit Citation	1 February 1951 – 31 March 1953	12th Fighter-Bomber Squadron
	Vietnamese Gallantry Cross with Palm	1 April 1966 – 30 June 1970	12th Tactical Fighter Squadron

- Hughes Trophy: 1981

Campaign Streamer	Campaign	Dates	Notes
	Air Combat, Asiatic-Pacific Theater	10 February 1942 – 2 March 1946	12th Pursuit Squadron (later 12th Fighter Squadron)
	Guadalcanal	7 August 1942 – 21 February 1943	12th Fighter Squadron
	Northern Solomons	23 February 1943 – 21 November 1944	12th Fighter Squadron
	Bismarck Archipelago	15 December 1943 – 27 November 1944	12th Fighter Squadron
	New Guinea	24 January 1943 – 31 December 1944	12th Fighter Squadron
	Leyte	17 October 1944 – 1 July 1945	12th Fighter Squadron
	Luzon	15 December 1944 – 4 July 1945	12th Fighter Squadron
	Southern Philippines	27 February 1945 – 4 July 1945	12th Fighter Squadron
	China Defensive	4 July 1942 – 4 May 1945	12th Fighter Squadron
	Western Pacific	17 April 1944 – 2 September 1945	12th Fighter Squadron
	UN Defensive	28 July 1950 – 15 September 1950	12th Fighter-Bomber Squadron
	UN Offensive	16 September 1950 – 2 November 1950	12th Fighter-Bomber Squadron
	CCF Intervention	3 November 1950 – 24 January 1951	12th Fighter-Bomber Squadron
	1st UN Counteroffensive	25 January 1951 – 21 April 1951	12th Fighter-Bomber Squadron
	CCF Spring Offensive	22 April 1951 – 9 July 1951	12th Fighter-Bomber Squadron
	UN Summer-Fall Offensive	9 July 1951 – 27 November 1951	12th Fighter-Bomber Squadron
	Second Korean Winter	28 November 1951 – 30 April 1952	12th Fighter-Bomber Squadron
	Korea Summer-Fall 1952	1 May 1952 – 30 November 1952	12th Fighter-Bomber Squadron
	Third Korean Winter	1 December 1952 – 30 April 1953	12th Fighter-Bomber Squadron
	Vietnam Advisory	1 November 1961 – 1 March 1965	12th Tactical Fighter Squadron
	Vietnam Defensive	2 March 1965 – 30 January 1966	12th Tactical Fighter Squadron
