= List of Korean airfields during the Korean War =

This is a list of landing grounds used by the United States Air Force during the Korean War (25 June 1950 – 27 July 1953). Many of which were former Japanese airfields, and the "K" designation was used to identify individual airfields from both North and South Korea to prevent confusion.

== List ==
Airfields
Number	Name	USAF Squadrons	Coordinates	Fate	Notes
K-1 (South Korea)	Pusan West Air Base	17th Bombardment Wing	Location: 35°10′46″N 128°56′18″E	Gimhae Air Base	
K-2 (South Korea)	Taegu Air Base	18th Fighter-Bomber Group	Location: 35°53′39″N 128°39′32″E	Daegu International Airport	
K-3 (South Korea)	Po'hang Airdrome	35th Fighter-Interceptor Group	Location: 35°59′16″N 129°25′13″E	Pohang Gyeongju Airport	
K-4 (South Korea)	Sacheon Airdrome		Location: 35°05′18.75″N 128°04′13.33″E	Sacheon Airport	
K-5 (South Korea)	Taejon Airfield		Location: 36°21′28.8″N 127°23′42″E	Decommissioned	
K-6 (South Korea)	Pyong Taek Airfield		Location: 36°57′38.4″N 127°02′01″E	Camp Humphreys	
K-7 (South Korea)	Kwangju Airfield		Location: 35°07′35″N 126°48′32″E		
K-8 (South Korea)	Kunsan Air Base		Location: 35°54′13″N 126°36′57″E		
K-9 (South Korea)	Pusan East Air Base	452d Bombardment Wing, 17th Bombardment Wing	Location: 35°10′10″N 129°07′54″E		
K-10 (South Korea)	Chinhae Air Base	18th Fighter-Bomber Group	Location: 35°08′28″N 128°41′45″E		
K-11 (South Korea)	Ulsan Airfield				
K-12 (South Korea)	Marigun Airfield				
K-13 (South Korea)	Suwon Air Base		Location: 37°14′08″N 127°00′34″E		
K-14 (South Korea)	Kimpo Air Base	4th Fighter Wing, 8th Fighter-Bomber Wing, 51st Fighter-Interceptor Wing	Location: 37°33′29″N 126°47′26″E		
K-15 (South Korea)	Mokpo Air Base		Location: 34°45′31″N 126°22′28″E		
K-16 (South Korea)	Seoul Air Base	35th Fighter-Interceptor Group	Location: 37°26′45″N 127°07′50″E		
K-17 (North Korea)	Ongjin Airfield		Location: 37°55′51.70″N 125°24′54.30″E		
K-18 (South Korea)	Kangnung Airfield		Location: 37°45′12″N 128°56′37″E		
K-19 (North Korea)	Haeju Airdrome		Location: 38°00′23.60″N 125°46′43.80″W	Haeju Airport	
K-20 (North Korea)	Sinmak Airfield		Location: 38°26′00″N 126°14′00″E		
K-21 (North Korea)	P’yonggang Airdrome				
K-22 (North Korea)	Onjong-Ni Airdrome				
K-23 (North Korea)	P’yongyang Airdrome	8th Fighter Wing	Location: 39°02′4″N 125°46′55″E	Pyongyang Air Base	
K-24 (North Korea)	Pyongyang East Airdrome	18th Fighter-Bomber Wing	Location: 39°0′35″N 125°50′50″E	Mirim Airport	
K-25 (North Korea)	Wonsan Airbase		Location: 39°9′59″N 127°29′3″E	Kalma Airport	
K-26 (North Korea)	Songdok Airdrome		Location:39°44′50.40″N 127°28′28.60″E	Sondok Airport	
K-27 (North Korea)	Yonpo Airdrome	35th Fighter-Interceptor Group	Location: 39°47′26″N 127°32′7″E	Decommissioned	
K-28 (North Korea)	Hamhung West Airdrome				
K-29 (North Korea)	Sinanju Airdome				
K-30 (North Korea)	Sinuiju Airdrome		Location: 40°05′11.10″N 124°24′25.20″E	Sinuiju Airport	
K-31 (North Korea)	Kiichu Airdrome (Kisschu)				
K-32 (North Korea)	Oesichon-Dong Airdrome		Location: 41°08′24.70″N 126°21′26.40″E	Manpo Airport	
K-33 (North Korea)	Hoemun Airdrome		Location: 41°25′45″N 129°38′54″E	Orang Airport	
K-34 (North Korea)	Ch’ongjin Airdrome (Seishin)				
K-35 (North Korea)	Hoeryong Airdrome				
K-36 (North Korea)	Kanggye No. 2 Airdrome				
K-37 (South Korea)	Taegu West Air Base		Location: 35°50′27″N 128°35′28″E	Camp Walker	
K-38 (South Korea)	Wonju Airdrome				
K-39 (South Korea)	Cheju-do Airdrome No. 1				
K-40 (South Korea)	Cheju-do Air Base No. 2		Location: 33°12′18″N 126°16′15″E		
K-41 (South Korea)	Ch’ungju Airdrome				
K-42 (South Korea)	Andong Airdrome				
K-43 (South Korea)	Kyongju Airdrome				
K-44 (South Korea)	Changhowon-Ni Airdrome				
K-45 (South Korea)	Yoju Airdrome (Yoido)				
K-46 (South Korea)	Hoengsong Airdrome		Location: 37°27′33″N 127°58′37″E	Wonju Airport	
K-47 (South Korea)	Ch’unch’on Airdrome				
K-48 (South Korea)	Iri Airdrome				
K-49 (South Korea)	Seoul East Airdrome				
K-50 (North Korea)	Sokcho-Ri Airdrome				
K-51 (South Korea)	Inje Airdrome				
K-52 (North Korea)	Yanggu Airdrome				
K-53 (South Korea)	Paengnyong-do Airfield			Never built; only served as a post-war signals intelligence station	
K-54 (South Korea)	Konsong Airfield (Cho-do)			Never built	
K-55 (South Korea)	Osan-ni Air Base	18th Fighter-Bomber Wing	Location: 37°05′26″N 127°01′47″E	Osan Air Base	
K-56 (South Korea)	Yangyang Emergency Airstrip			Never built	
K-57 (South Korea)	Kwang’ju Air Base				

== See also ==
- Far East Air Force (United States)
- List of airports in North Korea
- List of airports in South Korea
