= Yonpo Airfield =

Airfield in North Korea

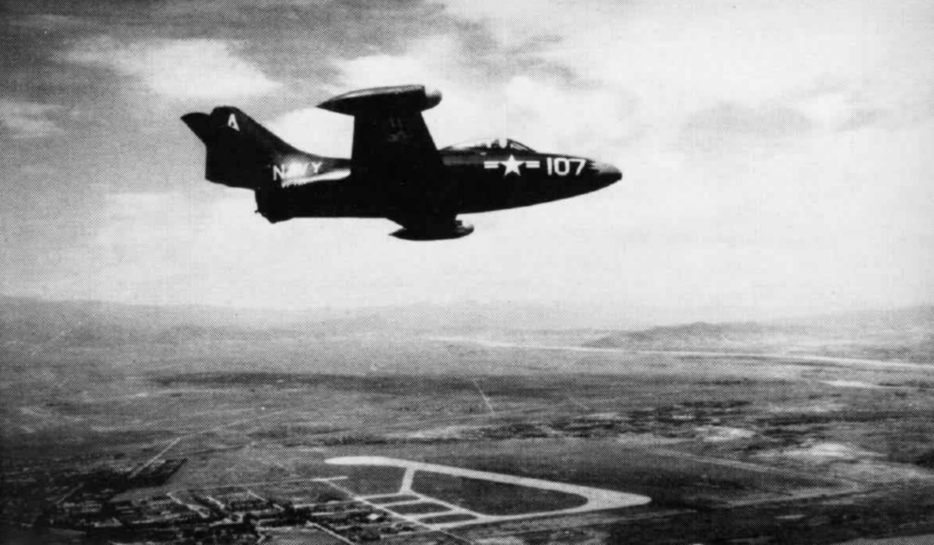
- F9F-2 of VF-721 about to attack Yonpo in 1951

Site information
- Type: Military airfield
- Owner: Korean People's Air Force
- Controlled by: Imperial Japanese Army Air Service; Korean People's Air Force; United States Air Force

Location
- Coordinates: 39°47′26″N 127°32′7″E

Site history
- Built: 1940s
- Built by: Imperial Japanese Army Air Service
- In use: 1940s-2021
- Materials: concrete
- Battles/wars: Battle of Chosin Reservoir

Yonpo Airfield (Korean: 련포비행장), also known as Yonpo Air Base or K-27 Air Base, was an airport near Hamhung, South Hamgyong Province, North Korea.

== History ==
=== Korean War ===
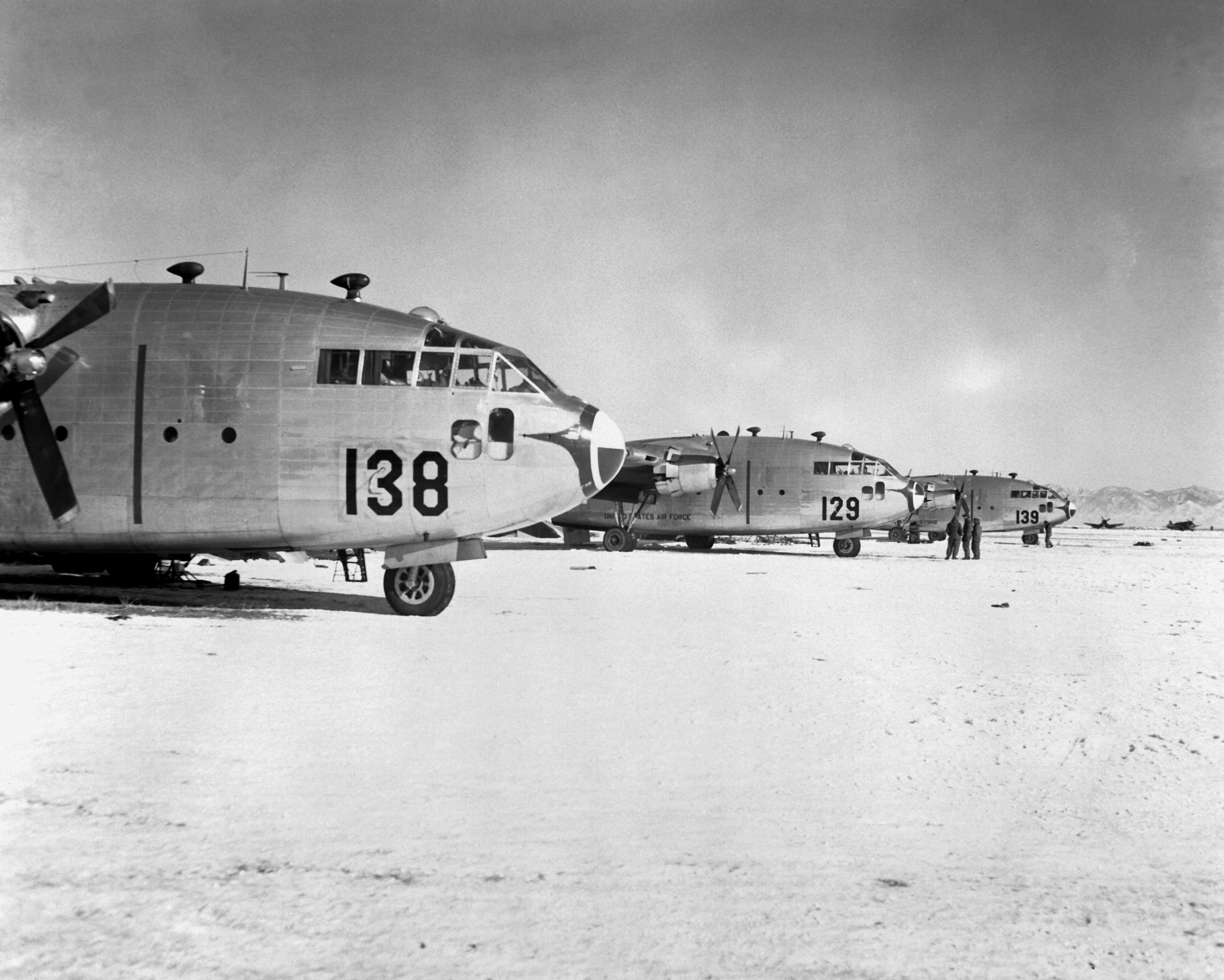
C-119s preparing to drop supplies to Marines in the Chosin Reservoir

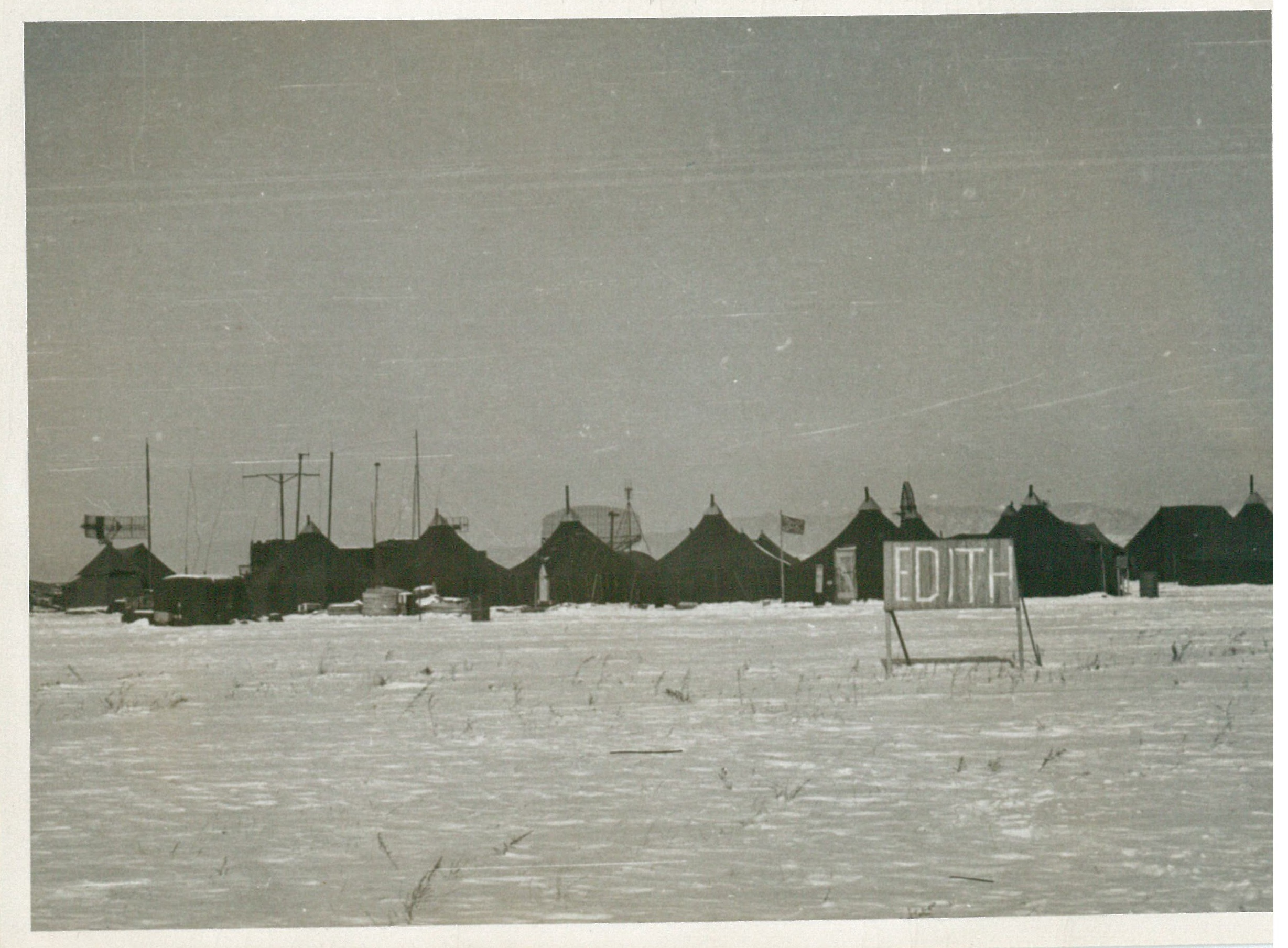
Marine Ground Control Intercept Squadron 1 radar site located at Yonpo Airfield in December 1950.

On 2 July 1950, the 19th Bombardment Group launched a strike on Yonpo Airfield based on faulty intelligence there were 65 Korean People's Air Force (KPAF) aircraft there, but only 16 KPAF aircraft were in the field, none of which were damaged by the airstrike. On 19 July carrier aircraft of Task Force 77 attacked Yonpo destroying 15 aircraft.

The Yonpo area was captured by the 5th and 7th Marine Regiments advancing from Wonsan on 30 October 1950 and the airfield was put into service by the UN forces. The USAF designated the base K-27. The 35th Fighter-Interceptor Group moved to the base on 18 November and was joined by the Marine Aircraft Group 12 on 1 December, both provided close air support to the U. S. Army X Corps and the 1st U.S. Marine Division surrounded at the Battle of Chosin Reservoir. X Corps established a casualty clearing and evacuation station at Yonpo for casualties evacuated from the Chosin.

USAF units based there included:

- 35th Fighter-Interceptor Group from 18 November-7 December 1950, units attached included:
  - 39th Fighter-Interceptor Squadron operating F-51Ds
  - 40th Fighter-Interceptor Squadron operating F-51Ds
  - 339th Fighter-Interceptor Squadron operating F-82Gs
- 437th Troop Carrier Wing operating C-46s
- 6150th Tactical Support Wing from 27 November-1 December 1950

USMC units based there included:

- Marine Aircraft Group 12 from 1–17 December 1950, units attached included:
  - VMF-212 operating F4Us until 7 December 1950
  - VMF-311 operating F-9Fs from 10 to 14 December 1950
  - VMO-6 operating OYs and HO3S'

UN units based there included:

- No. 77 Squadron RAAF operating F-51Ds attached to the 35th Fighter-Interceptor Group

Following the successful retreat from the Chosin Reservoir, US Marines of Regimental Combat Teams 5 and 7 prepared a defensive line around Yonpo on 9 December, however General Douglas MacArthur ordered the withdrawal of X Corps to South Korea. MacArthur met with General Edward Almond at Yonpo on 11 December and approved the X Corps' evacuation plan. From 14 to 17 December USAF Combat Cargo Command moved 228 patients, 3,891 passengers, and 20,088 tons of cargo from Yonpo. The aerial evacuation from Yonpo continued until 17 December when the field was closed and operations were moved to a temporary field at Hungnam harbour.

== Incidents ==
- On 8 December 1950, a Curtiss C-46F-1-CU Commando of Civil Air Transport (XT-44) was damaged beyond repair on landing here, killing one passenger of the 10 occupants.

== Current usage ==
Yonpo Airfield was demolished in 2021. A new greenhouse farm was built on the old airfield, named Ryonpho Greenhouse Farm.

== See also ==
- Battle of the Chosin Reservoir
- Pyongyang Air Base
- Pyongyang East Air Base (K-24)
