= Sinmak Airfield (K-20) =

Airfield used in the Korean War

Sinmak Airfield (K-20)
- Sinmak, North Hwanghae Province in North Korea
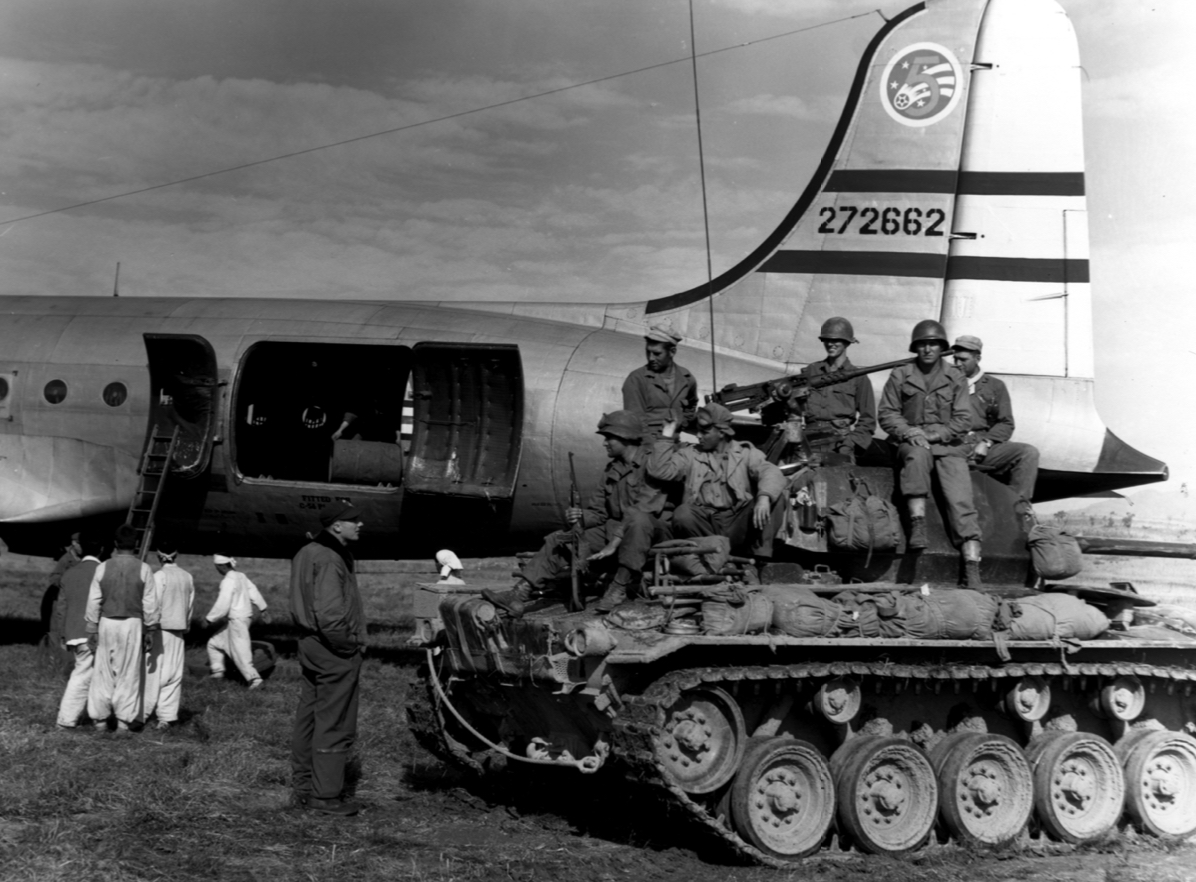
- A Fifth Air Force Douglas C-54 Skymaster unloading drums of oil at Sinmak Airfield in preparation for the Eighth Army’s advance, October 1950.

Site information
- Owner: Korean People's Army
- Operator: Korean People's Army Air Force
- Condition: Demolished

Location
- Shown within North Korea
- Coordinates: 38°26′00″N 126°14′00″E

Site history
- Built: 1945
- Built by: USSR
- In use: 1945 - 1953, 1968 - 1970
- Fate: Abandoned
- Battles/wars: Korean War

Garrison information
- Designations: K-20

Airfield information
Runways
Direction	Length and surface
NE/SW	831 metres (2,726 ft) Pierced Steel Planking

Sinmak Airfield (K-20) is a former Korean People's Army Air Force airfield, which was mainly operational during the Korean War. It was located in Sinmak, North Hwanghae Province, North Korea.

== History ==
Sinmak Airfield was originally built by the Soviet Union during the Soviet Occupation of Northern Korea. Following the end of World War II, the airfield was abandoned in 1945 as Soviet forces were withdrawn.

Head of the Sinmak Labor Party, Chong Un-kyong, aged 36, was in charge in the reconstruction of Sinmak Airfield. In order to make way for the airfield, 98 acres of farmland were taken, and that the owners would be given other pieces of land as compensation. However, this never materialised, and most of the owners were sent to local coal mining. The airfield was expected to complete by December 1949.

=== Construction ===
On November 1, 1949, construction work on Sinmak Airfield began with a compulsory number of one hundred laborers from each province, expected to serve ten days each in order to complete the airfield. These workers were not paid, and had to house and feed themselves during their service. People who were against the labor were given severe punishments, however, only a few people had opposed. In December 1949, the 1st Battalion, 3rd Regiment of the 1st Division was stationed at Sinmak.

Due to the insufficient number of workers caused by the unavailability of people, the airfield faced a lot of delays and did not meet the expected completion date. Finally, by 1950, the airfield was constructed using Pierced Steel Planking, and opened as an advanced airfield. It was protected by Soviet MiG units.

== Korean War ==
On the morning of 25 June 1950, the NKPAF deployed 10 Yakovlev Yak-9s to Sinmak Airfield from their operational fighter squadron, to expand their short ranged interceptor's coverage of South Korea. An additional 2 Ilyushin Il-10s were also deployed at the airfield. On 17 July, Sinmak Airfield received raids by B-26 Invader light bombers, and kept them "post-holed" to prevent further operations. On October, Sinmak served as a northern advancement point for the Eighth Army during the Korean War. In June 1951, the head of the Chinese Communist 41 Division and 4th Field Army was deployed at Sinmak.

=== USAF Occupation ===
By October 16, 1951, UN forces captured Sinmak. A day later, the airfield was opened by the Far East Air Force. The 8055th Mobile Army Surgical Hospital was stationed at the airfield, and it is 200 doctors took care of patients taken from Kimpo. The FEAF Combat Cargo Command was also stationed, airlifting fuel and rations to support UN offensive operations in Pyongyang. Shortly afterwards, Sinmak Airfield was designated as K-20 Airdrome. On March 11, 1952, the Fifth Air Force dropped 150 tons of bombs onto a troop training area near the airfield. Operations officers reported that this was the most intense napalm attack on a single area.

Sinmak Airfield also saw the last Royal Australian Air Force combat in the Korean War, on March 27, 1953, the No. 77 Squadron RAAF deployed two Gloster Meteors operated by Sergeants George Hale and David Irlam to conduct road reconnaissance missions. The two pilots saw what appeared to be a lone MiG-15, and Hale dived in to attack, however, was opposed by three other enemy aircraft. Hale fired cannon at several of these aircraft, before returning to base after running out of ammunition. This event acted as the last aerial combat action for the RAAF ever since.

In May 1953, the Far East Air Force left Sinmak, and reconstruction soon begun with 3000 villagers recruited from surrounding areas. Constant air-raids by the United Nations affected construction operations, in which several tunnel-like shelters made of sandbags and camouflage were used to conceal aircraft. There were no aircraft assigned to the airfield, however, 20 North Korean troops were stationed.

=== Post-war ===
In 1968, Sinmak Airfield appeared to begin reconstruction with three caves connected to the northern end of the runway, ten barracks, and a runway. In March 1970, Sinmak Airfield was reported with 943 meter-long grading, and a 831-meter-long runway. The dispersal site consisted of three revetments located west south-end of the runway, and no support facilities were observed.

== Incidents ==
On May 7, 1951, a Douglas A-26B-61-DL Invader operated by the United States Air Force was shot down by anti-aircraft fire during a bombing mission over Pyongyang, North Korea. The aircraft crashed near Sinmak after losing its right engine. Unfortunately, the captain was killed while maneuvering the aircraft out of the combat zone, where two other crew members successfully bailed out and survived.
