= Pyongyang Air Base =

1940s–1950s military base in North Korea

- 평양 공항 平壤空軍基地

Site information
- Type: Military airfield
- Controlled by: Imperial Japanese Army Air Service; Korean People's Air Force; United States Air Force

Location
- Coordinates: 39°02′4″N 125°46′55″E

Site history
- Built: 1940s
- Built by: Imperial Japanese Army Air Service
- In use: 1940s–1950

Pyongyang Air Base, also known as Heijo Airfield, (designated K-23) was a former Imperial Japanese Army Air Service, Korean People's Air Force (KPAF) and United States Air Force (USAF) air base adjacent to the Taedong River in Pyongyang, North Korea. It was redeveloped after the Korean War as a Government and residential area.

== History ==
The air base was originally developed during the Japanese Imperial period. The base was home to a Showa aircraft plant and the 6th Air Regiment and the Imperial Japanese Army's Heijo Arsenal with Nambu, which manufactured hand and long infantry weapons.

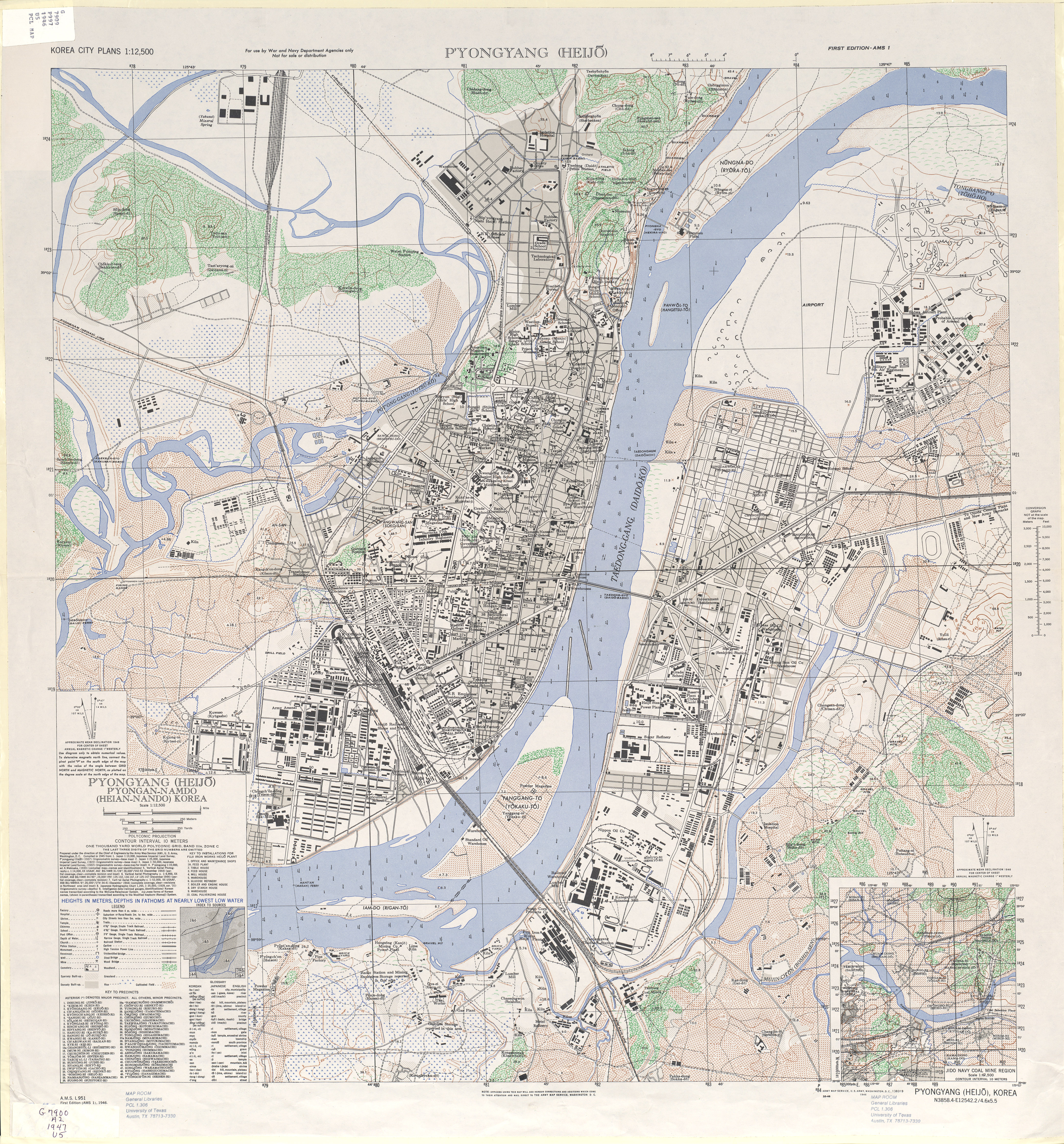
Map of Pyongyang in 1946 showing the location of the air base at upper right

=== Korean War ===
The Showa aircraft factory and air section of the arsenal were believed to be the center of North Korea's aircraft maintenance and supply system.

On the afternoon of 29 June 1950, 18 B-26s of the 3rd Bombardment Group attacked Pyongyang Air Base. Arriving at dusk they bombed the hangar line, ramps and revetments, destroying an estimated 25 aircraft on the ground. Only one KPAF Yak-3 fighter got airborne to oppose the attack and it was shot down by a B-26 gunner.

From 3–4 July 1950 aircraft from Task Force 77 attacked Pyongyang and Pyongyang East airfields and Onjong-Ni Airfield shooting down two Yak-3s and damaging a further 10 aircraft on the ground. On 18 July 1950 aircraft from Task Force 77 attacked the Pyongyang airfields again destroying 14 aircraft and damaging 13.

Following the capture of Pyongyang on 19 October 1950 the air base was put into service by the UN forces. The USAF designated the base K-23.

USAF units stationed at the base included:

- 8th Operations Wing from 25 November–3 December 1950
- 8th Fighter Wing operating F-51s from 1–9 December 1950
- 6131st Tactical Support Wing

The US Army's D Battery 865th Antiaircraft Artillery Battalion provided anti-aircraft defense for the base.

UN forces abandoned the base on 5 December 1950 as part of the evacuation of Pyongyang in the face of the Chinese intervention. On 10 December 1950 B-29s bombed the airfield with high-explosive bombs.

On 23 January 1951, 46 F-80s of the 49th Fighter-Bomber Wing attacked anti-aircraft positions around Pyongyang and once this was completed 21 B-29s of the 19th and 307th Bombardment Groups from Okinawa bombed the airfield.

=== Postwar ===
The area was redeveloped in the late 1950s as a Government and residential area.

== See also ==
- Pyongyang East Air Base (K-24)
- Pyongyang Sunan International Airport
- Yonpo Airfield
