= Frank L. Gailer Jr. =

Brigadier General in the United States Air Force

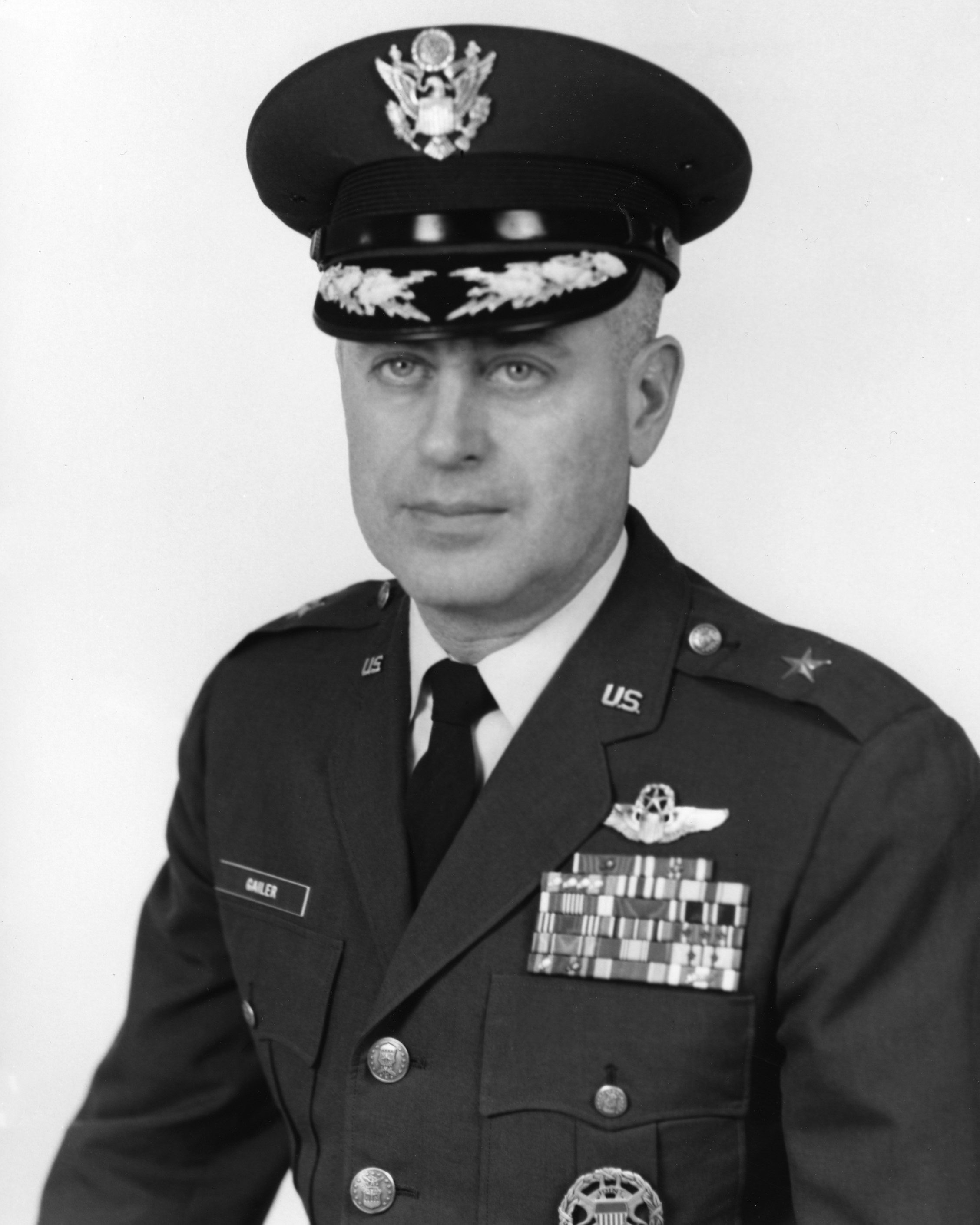
- Gailer as a brigadier general in 1970
- Born: November 13, 1923; Bakersfield, California, U.S.
- Died: September 6, 2018 (aged 94); Louisville, Colorado, U.S.
- Burial place: Arlington National Cemetery
- Military career
- Allegiance: United States of America
- Branch: United States Air Force
- Service years: 1942–1972
- Rank: Brigadier General
- Units: 357th Fighter Group; 35th Tactical Fighter Wing
- Commands: Headquarters Squadron, 6th Fighter Wing; 3640th Pilot Training Wing; 3630th Flying Training Wing; 35th Tactical Fighter Wing; 48th Tactical Fighter Wing; Third Air Force
- Conflicts: World War II; Vietnam War
- Awards: Legion of Merit (3); Distinguished Flying Cross (2); Purple Heart; Air Medal (21)

Frank Lewis Gailer Jr. (November 13, 1923 – September 6, 2018) was an American flying ace in the 357th Fighter Group during World War II, and a career fighter pilot in the United States Air Force. During World War II, Gailer was credited in the destruction of 5.5 enemy aircraft in aerial combat before he was subsequently shot down and taken prisoner. During Vietnam War, he commanded a fighter wing and flew more than 200 combat missions.

He retired in 1972 at the rank of Brigadier General.

== Early life ==
Gailer was born in Bakersfield, California, in 1923. Shortly thereafter, his family moved to New York, finally settling in Great Neck, Long Island. He graduated from Staunton Military Academy in 1941, and attended Hofstra College in Hempstead, New York, until June 1942.

== Military career ==
He then entered the aviation cadet program and received pilot training at Parks Air College in Garden City, Kansas, and finally at Eagle Pass, Texas, where he earned his pilot wings and commission as second lieutenant.

=== World War II ===
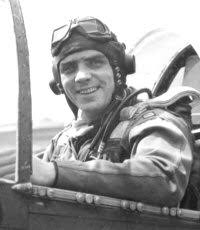
Gailer onboard his P-51, during WWII

In September 1943, Gailer was assigned to Columbia Army Air Base in South Carolina, for tactical training in the North American B-25 Mitchell bomber and in February 1944 was transferred to P-40 Warhawk training at Thomasville, Georgia.

In July 1944, he was assigned to the 363d Fighter Squadron of the 357th Fighter Group in England as a P-51 pilot. Flying missions from RAF Leiston, he scored three shared aerial victories in September 1944, with two of them during Operation Market Garden. On October 7, he scored his first solo aerial victory when he shot down a Focke-Wulf Fw 190 over Zeitz. Five days later, he shot down a Messerschmitt Bf 109 over Hanover. He shot down two Fw 190s over Magdeburg on November 27, his final aerial victories and on the same day, he was shot down by a friendly fire from a P-51 and after bailing out his aircraft, he was captured by the Germans. He was interred at Stalag Luft I until April 29, 1945, when the camp was liberated by Soviet Red Army troops.

During World War II, Gailer was credited with the destruction of 5.5 enemy aircraft in aerial combat plus 1 destroyed on the ground while strafing enemy airfields. While serving with the 357th FG, he flew P-51 bearing the name "Expectant" with fuselage identification code BA:6.

=== Post war ===
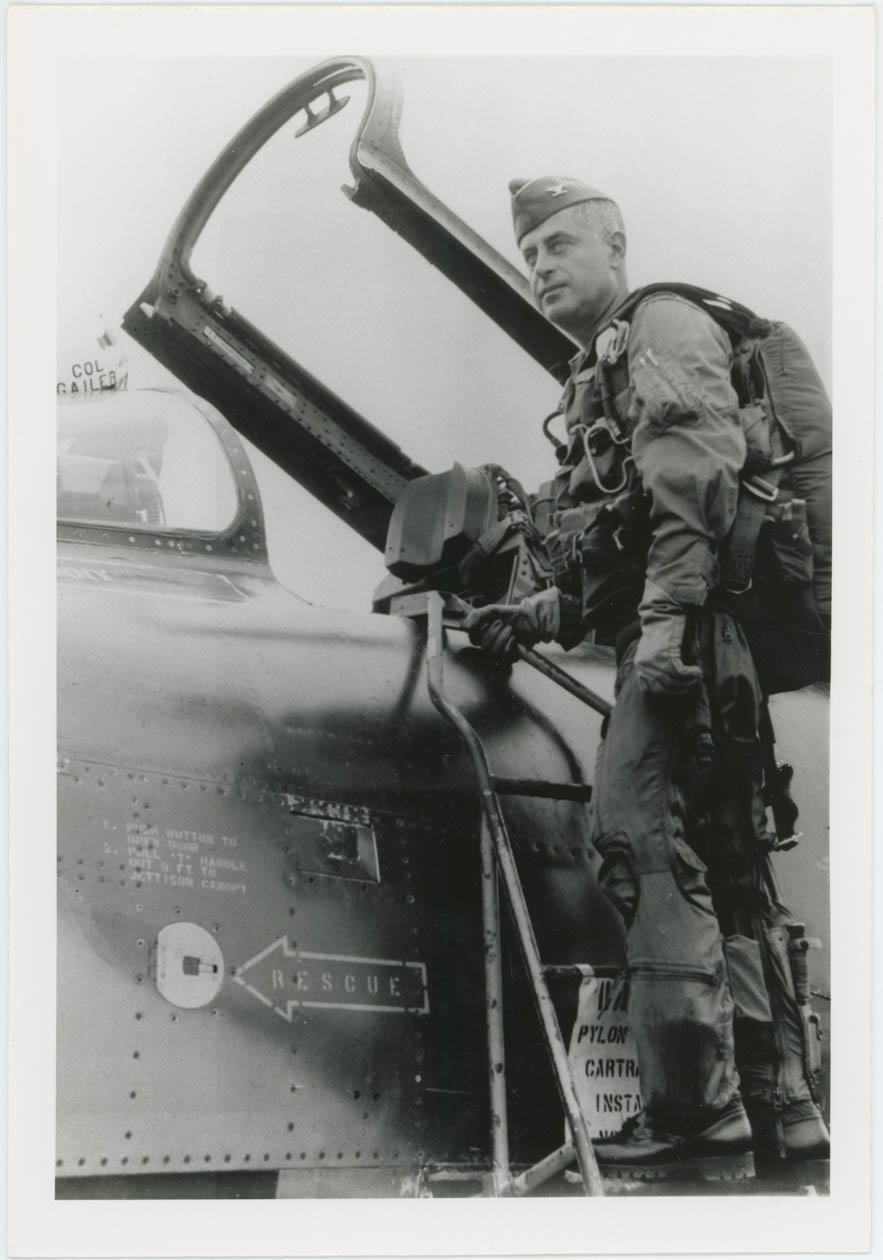
Gailer as commanding officer of 35th TFW, during Vietnam War

Gailer returned to the United States in 1945 and until June 1946, he served as base flight operations officer at Selfridge Field in Michigan. He went to the Panama Canal Zone as a squadron commander in the 6th Fighter Wing. From February 1949 until June 1954, he served as group operations officer and then deputy commander of the 6570th Chemical and Ordnance Test Group at Aberdeen Proving Ground in Maryland. He graduated with a Bachelor of Science in 1953 and a Master of Arts in international affairs in 1960, from the University of Maryland.

In February 1955, Gailer was assigned the U.S. Air Force Mission to Uruguay as the jet fighter adviser. From December 1958 until June 1962, he served as chief of the Latin American Missions Branch within the Deputy Chief of Staff for Operations at the Headquarters U.S. Air Force in the Pentagon. From July 1962 until July 1963, he served as an action officer in the Office of the Special Assistant for Military Assistance Affairs, with the Organization of the Joint Chiefs of Staff. He has also completed an additional 30 semester hours of study toward his doctorate of philosophy degree. His article "USAF Mission in Latin America," was published in the Air University Quarterly Review, fall 1961.

He next attended the National War College in Washington, D.C., graduating in June 1964. From there he served as deputy commander for operation of the 3640th Pilot Training Wing at the Laredo Air Force Base in Texas. In January 1966, he was assigned as the first commander of the newly organized 3630th Flying Training Wing at Sheppard Air Force Base in Texas. From August 1967 to July 1968, he was assigned to the National War College as a member of the faculty.

In September 1968, he assumed command of the 35th Tactical Fighter Wing at Phan Rang Air Base in South Vietnam, during the Vietnam War. He flew 235 combat missions in the F-100 Super Sabre over South Vietnam and was awarded a second Distinguished Flying Cross for "extraordinary achievement while participating in aerial flight".

In September 1969, Gailer arrived at RAF Lakenheath in England, where he assumed command of the 48th Tactical Fighter Wing. He was named vice commander of the Third Air Force with headquarters at RAF South Ruislip in Middlesex, England, in February 1970. He served this position until his retirement from the Air Force on August 1, 1972.

== Later life ==
Gailer was married twice, and had three daughters and numerous grandchildren.

After his retirement from the Air Force, he moved to San Antonio, Texas, where he worked in investments business. He was also a member of the American Fighter Aces Association and Pi Sigma Alpha. He died on September 6, 2018, at the age of 94 and was buried at Arlington National Cemetery.

== Aerial victory credits ==
Date	#	Type	Location	Aircraft flown	Unit Assigned
September 13, 1944	0.5	Messerschmitt Bf 109	Kassel, Germany	P-51C Mustang	363 FS, 357 FG
September 18, 1944	0.5	Focke-Wulf Fw 190	Arnhem, Netherlands	P-51C	363 FS, 357 FG
September 19, 1944	0.5	Bf 109	Arnhem, Netherlands	P-51C	363 FS, 357 FG
October 7, 1944	1	Fw 190	Zeitz, Germany	P-51D	363 FS, 357 FG
October 12, 1944	1	Bf 109	Hanover, Germany	P-51D	363 FS, 357 FG
November 27, 1944	2	Fw 190	Magdeburg, Germany	P-51D	363 FS, 357 FG

SOURCE: Air Force Historical Study 85: USAF Credits for the Destruction of Enemy Aircraft, World War II

== Awards and decorations ==
His awards include:

USAF Command pilot badge
Legion of Merit with two bronze oak leaf clusters
Distinguished Flying Cross with bronze oak leaf cluster
Purple Heart
Air Medal with four silver oak leaf clusters
Joint Service Commendation Medal
Air Force Commendation Medal
Army Commendation Medal
Air Force Outstanding Unit Award
Prisoner of War Medal
Army Good Conduct Medal
American Campaign Medal
European-African-Middle Eastern Campaign Medal with three bronze campaign stars
World War II Victory Medal
National Defense Service Medal with service star
Vietnam Service Medal with two bronze campaign stars
Air Force Longevity Service Award with silver and bronze oak leaf clusters
Small Arms Expert Marksmanship Ribbon
Vietnam Air Force Distinguished Service Order (2nd Class)
Republic of Vietnam Gallantry Cross
Vietnam Campaign Medal
