= Pusan East Air Base =

Decommissioned air base in Busan, South Korea (1940–1996)

Pusan East Air Base 동부산공군기지
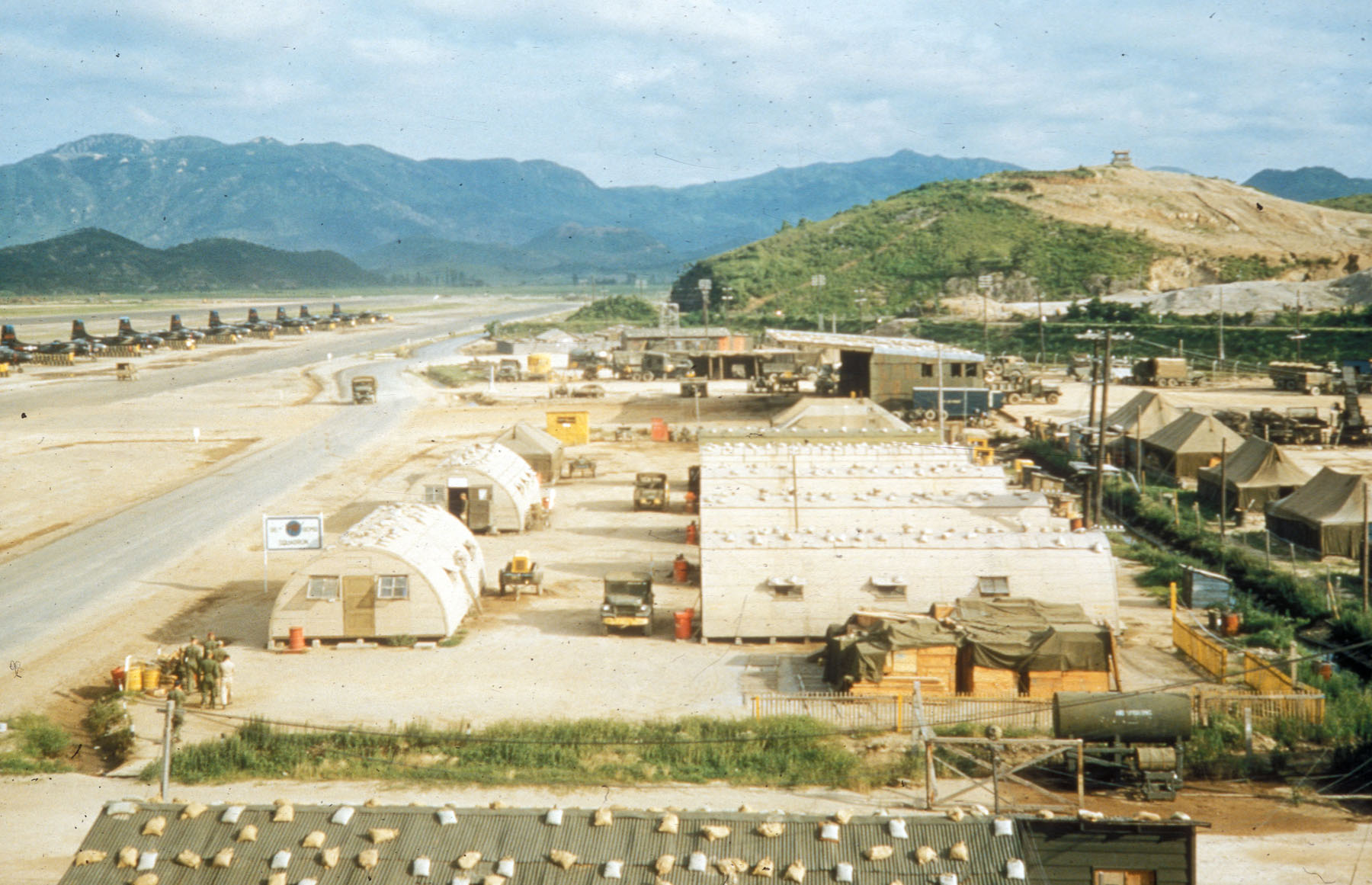
- Pusan East Air Base in June 1953
- IATA: ~~PSN~~; ICAO: ~~RKPP~~

Summary
- Airport type: Military
- Operator: USAF (1940–1956); ROKAF (1956–1996)
- Location: Haeundae-gu, Busan
- Opened: 1958
- Closed: February 16, 1996
- Passenger services ceased: August 1, 1976
- Built: 1940
- Elevation AMSL: 58 ft (18 m)
- Coordinates: 35°10′10″N 129°07′54″E

Map
- Location within South Korea Location within Asia Location within North Pacific Location within Earth

Runways
Direction	Length		Surface
Direction	m	ft	Surface
14/32	2,012	6,601	Hard

Pusan East Air Base (K-9) (IATA: ~~PSN~~, ICAO: ~~RKPP~~) was a United States Air Force (USAF) and Republic of Korea Air Force (ROKAF) air base adjacent to the Suyeong River in Haeundae District, Busan, South Korea. It was redeveloped in the 1990s as Centum City, a commercial and residential area.

== History ==
=== Korean War ===
By the end of July 1950, UN forces had been pushed back into the Pusan Perimeter, which contained three airfields all in poor condition. Engineers urgently improved the former Japanese military airfield at K-9 to allow heavy transport aircraft such as C-54s to land there.

On 8 September 1950 the 18th Fighter Wing arrived at K-9 from Ashiya Air Field before moving to Pyongyang East Air Base (K-24) in November 1950.

On 5 March 1951 a USAF C-54 #42-72663 was damaged beyond repair at K-9.

On 23 May 1951 the 452d Bombardment Wing operating the Douglas A-26 Invader was deployed to K-9. On 10 May 1952 the 17th Bombardment Wing was activated at K-9 to replace the 452d.

=== Post Korean War ===
K-9 was transferred to the South Korean military in 1956 and remained in use until the early 1990s.

Busan Suyeong Airport opened in August 1958 and renamed as Busan International Airport in September 1963. In August 1976 the airport was moved to its current location in Gimhae.

In the late 1990s the area was redeveloped as Centum City.

== See also ==
- Gimhae Air Base
- Gimhae International Airport
