= Gimhae Air Base =

Airbase in South Korea

Gimhae Air Base 김해공군기지
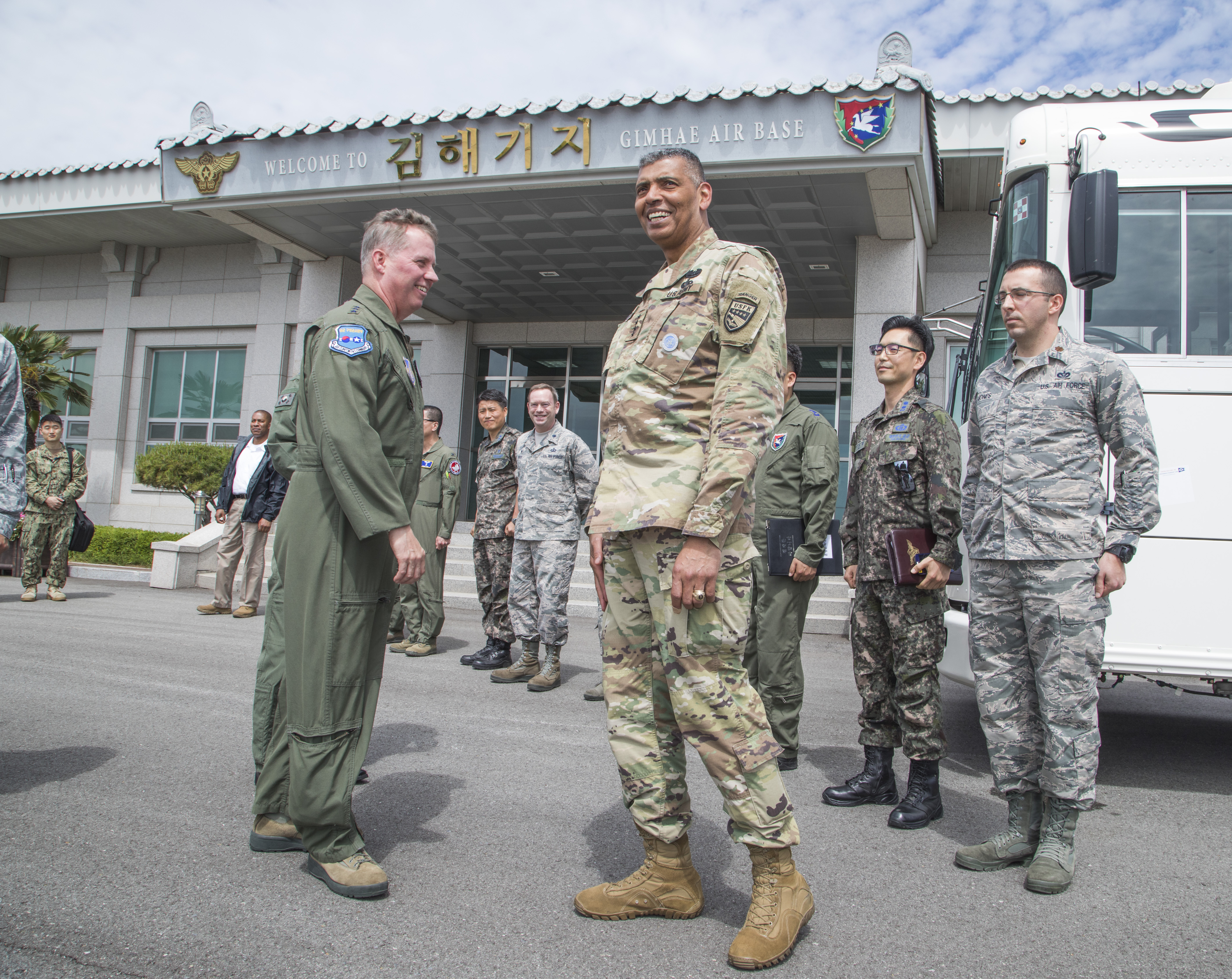
- Gimhae Air Base
- IATA: PUS; ICAO: RKPK

Summary
- Airport type: Military / Public
- Operator: Republic of Korea Air Force
- Location: Busan
- Elevation AMSL: 6 ft / 2 m
- Coordinates: 35°10′46″N 128°56′18″E

Map

Runways
Direction	Length		Surface
Direction	m	ft	Surface
18L/36R	2,745	9,007	Asphalt
18R/36L	3,200	10,499	Concrete
- Source: Korea Airports Corporation

Gimhae Air Base (IATA: PUS, ICAO: RKPK) is a Republic of Korea Air Force (ROKAF) base adjacent to Gimhae International Airport. Runway 18L/36R is used for military purposes only.

== Units ==
The base is home to the ROKAF's 5th Tactical Airlift Wing (제5전술공수비행단), comprising:

- 251st Tactical Air Support Squadron flying the C-130H and C-130H-30
- 258th Tactical Support Squadron flying the CN235-100M and CN235-220M
- 259th Tactical Air Support Squadron flying the UH-60P

The ROKAF's 4 Boeing 737 AEW&C Peace Eye aircraft were all delivered to the base which is to be the home base for the aircraft.

Until September 2010 a contingent of United States Air Force personnel of the 607th Materiel Maintenance Squadron served in a co-located operating base on Gimhae Air Base.

== History ==
The base was originally established during the Korean War as Pusan West (K-1) Air Base and hosted United States Air Force and United States Marine Corps units.

On 25 June 1950, 10 divisions of the North Korean People's Army attacked the Republic of Korea. The North Koreans quickly overwhelmed the South Korean Army and moved south. Following the passing of United Nations Security Council Resolution 83 on 27 June 1950, President Truman ordered US forces to defend the Republic of Korea. On 30 June 1950 C-54s of the Fifth Air Force began transporting a battalion of the 24th Infantry Division from Itazuke Air Base to K-1, however the weight of the C-54s damaged the runway and later flights were made using C-47s. On 2 July the Battalion, known as Task Force Smith, boarded trains to Taejon and was destroyed on 4 July in the Battle of Osan.

On 7 July 1950 two L-5s and an SC-47 from the 3rd Air Rescue Squadron (3rd ARS) deployed to K-1 from Ashiya AB in Japan, but the aircraft proved unsuitable for the terrain and returned to Japan on 16 July. On 30 August, the 3rd ARS formally organized Detachment F, with six H-5s at K-1. Following the success of the Inchon landing Detachment F moved north to Seoul (K-16) Air Base.

On 24 December 1950 the Air Defense Section of Marine Tactical Air Control Squadron 2 was deployed to K-1 to establish a tactical air command center.

By April 1951 K-1 served as the headquarters of the First Marine Air Wing and Marine Aircraft Group 12 was based at K-1 to provide aircraft for combat missions and special missions. VMA-513 flying F7Fs and F4U-5Ns were flying out of K-1 and providing the sole night fighter air defense and interdiction support to all UN forces in Korea.

On 31 May 1951 a US Navy R5D-3 #56513 hit a mountain at the end of the base killing all 5 passengers and crew.

In November 1951 the 1903rd Aviation Engineer Battalion arrived at K-1 and relieved the First Marine Air Wing of all responsibilities for maintaining the base and runways. Maintenance responsibility was later assumed by the 366th Aviation Battalion.

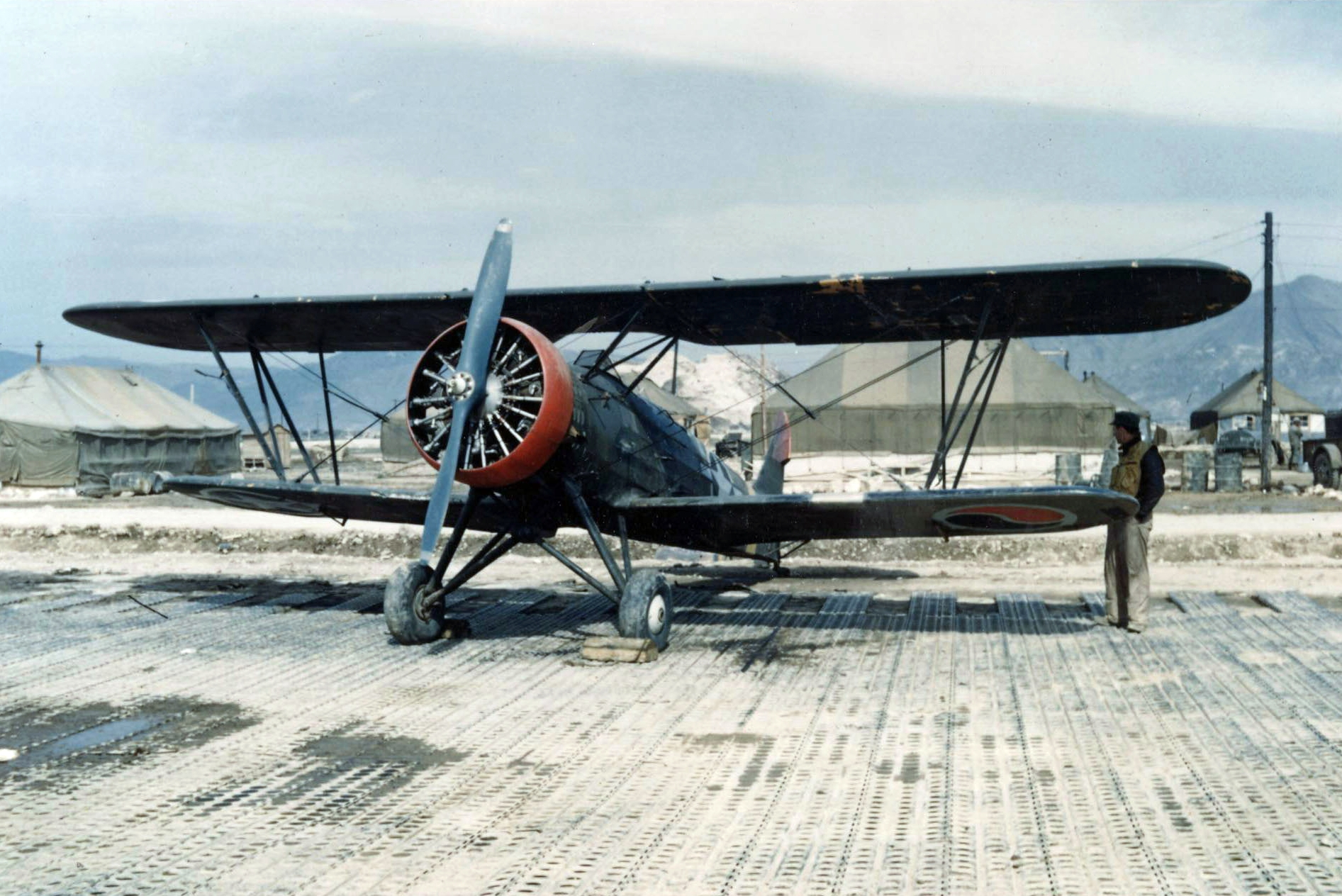
A ROKAF Tachikawa Ki-9 at K-1 in 1951

From October to December 1952, the 17th Bombardment Wing was based at K-1 to allow for the resurfacing of the Pusan East (K-9) Air Base runway from PSP to asphalt.

The base was the venue of a bilateral meeting between President Trump and President Xi on October 30, 2025, where the two leaders agreed to ease trade restrictions between the U.S. and China, especially regarding rare-earths and tariffs.
