= Mirim Airport =

Airport in North Korea

Mirim Airport Pyongyang East Airfield
- 미림비행장 美林飛行場
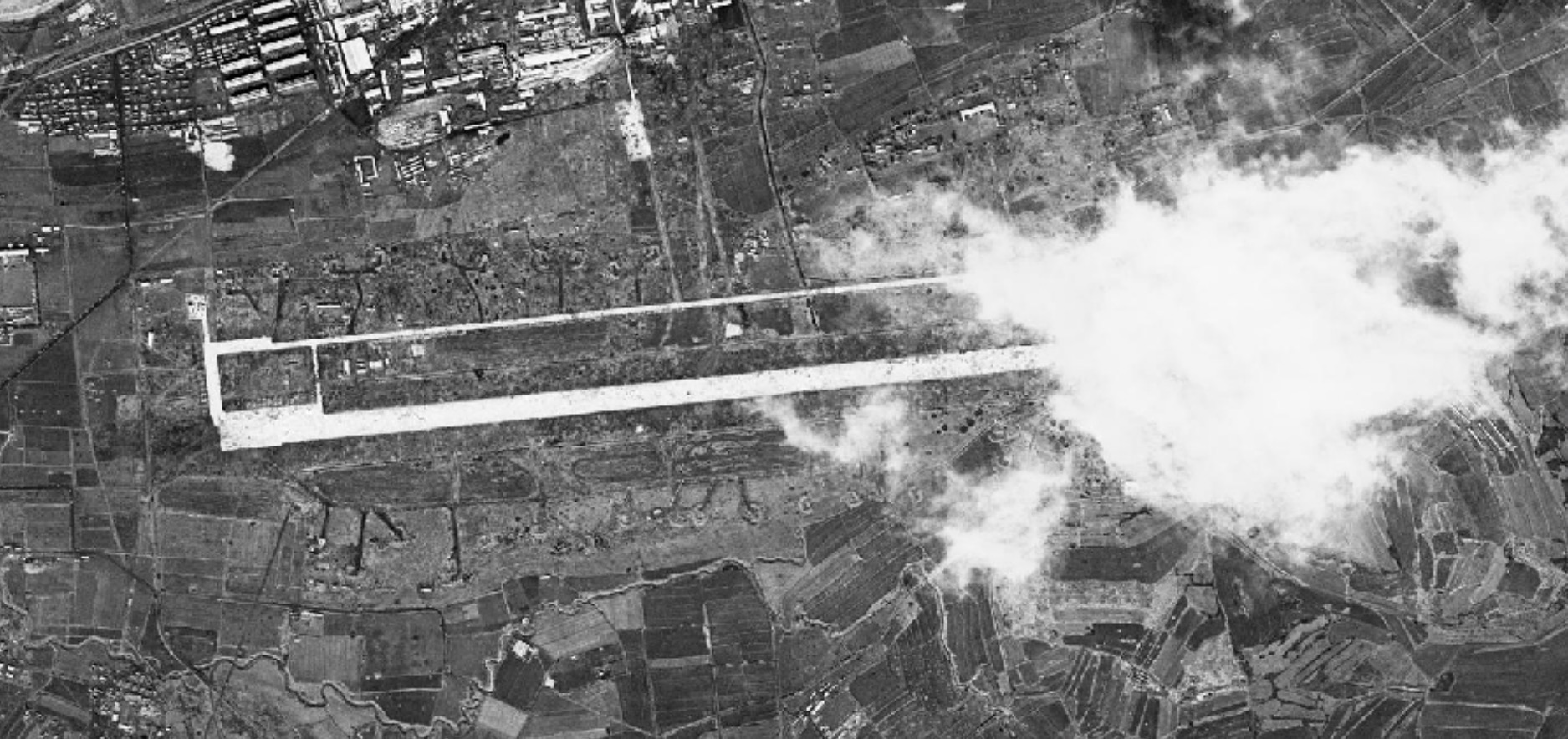
- Satellite imagery of Mirim Air Base captured by KH-7 on 16 March, 1965.

Site information
- Type: Military airfield
- Owner: Korean People's Army Air Force
- Controlled by: Korean People's Army Air Force
- Condition: used by ultralight aircraft only

Location
- Location within North Korea Location within Asia Location within North Pacific Location within Earth
- Coordinates: 39°0′35″N 125°50′50″E

Site history
- Built: 1940s
- Built by: Imperial Japanese Army Air Service
- In use: 1940s–present
- Materials: concrete

Airfield information
- Elevation: 9 m (30 ft) AMSL
Runways
Direction	Length and surface
09/27	1,314 m (4,311 ft)

Mirim Airport, also known as Pyongyang East Airfield (designated K-24), is an airport in Mirim-dong, Sadong-guyok, Pyongyang-si, North Korea.

== History ==
=== Korean War ===
Following the capture of Pyongyang on 19 October 1950 the air base was put into service by the UN forces. The USAF designated the base K-24.

USAF units stationed at the base included:

- 18th Fighter-Bomber Wing operating F-51s from 22 November–5 December 1950
- Detachment F, 3rd Air Rescue Squadron
- 6002nd Tactical Support Wing

UN units stationed at the base included:

- 2 Squadron SAAF operating F-51s

UN forces abandoned the base on 5 December 1950 as part of the evacuation of Pyongyang during the UN retreat from North Korea. On 10 December 1950 B-29s bombed the airfield with high-explosive bombs.

=== Post-war ===
In May 1952, the 272nd Construction Unit of the North Korean Air Force under the direction of Soviet advisors lengthened the runway. In June 2025 it satellite imagery revealed that the Mirim Parade Training Facility was through upgrade with large grassy lots paved and other areas repaved.

== Facilities ==
The airfield has a single concrete runway 09/27 measuring 4310 x 69 feet (1314 x 21 m). It is sited along the Taedong River on the eastern edge of the capital city of Pyongyang. It has several taxiways, but the former airbase facilities are no longer used for air traffic. The site has since become a staging ground for large capital parades.

North of the former airport is a 200 metres (660 ft) runway with two helipads and a single structure.

Mirim was the Korean People's Army main track (under KPA Unit 534) for horse riding training prior to Kim Jong Un ordering its transformation into the air club in late 2012.

A new facility consisting of a single runway was constructed in 2016 located at 39°0′35″N 125°50′50″E. Mirim Air Club operates ultralight aircraft from the airfield for tours around the city, which began in 2016.

Rehearsals for all military parades in North Korea usually take place 3–6 weeks prior to the actual parade at the Mirim Parade Training Facility, located on the eastern side of the base.

== See also ==
- Pyongyang Air Base
- Pyongyang Sunan International Airport
- Mirim Horse Riding Club
