= Nightcap (2016 TV series) =

- Genre: Sitcom
- Created by: Ali Wentworth
- Directed by: Johnny Milord
- Starring: Ali Wentworth; Lauren Blumenfeld; Don Fanelli; Jacob Wallach; Cherie Corinne Rice
- Country of origin: United States
- Original language: English
- No. of seasons: 2
- No. of episodes: 20

Production
- Executive producers: Ali Wentworth; Tom Brunelle; Brad Wollack; Troy Miller; Lydia Tenaglia; Chris Collins; Craig Shepherd
- Camera setup: Single-camera
- Running time: 22 minutes
- Production companies: Lionsgate Television; Dakota Pictures; Trout the Dog Productions; Free 90 Media; Zero Point Zero Production

Original release
- Network: Pop
- Release: November 16, 2016 – August 2, 2017

Nightcap is an American sitcom that was created by and starring Ali Wentworth with supporting roles by Lauren Blumenfeld, Brendan Clifford, Don Fanelli, Jacob Wallach and Cherie Corinne Rice. On January 12, 2016, the series was picked up for a 10-episode first season. On October 27, 2016, the series was renewed for a second season. The series premiered on Pop on November 16, 2016.

== Plot ==
Staci Cole is the overworked head talent booker on the fictitious fifth highest-rated late night talk show called Nightcap with Jimmy, where she and her fellow workers interact with different celebrities who will appear on the show.

== Cast ==
=== Main ===
- Ali Wentworth as Staci Cole, the head talent booker on Nightcap with Jimmy.
- Lauren Blumenfeld as Penny Jones, Staci's assistant.
- Don Fanelli as Todd Mitchell, Jimmy's best friend and a producer on Nightcap with Jimmy.
- Jason Tottenham as Davis Maxfield (season 2), a marketing executive sent in by the network.
- Jacob Wallach as Randy Wolfe (season 1; recurring season 2), an audio guy on Nightcap with Jimmy.
- Cherie Corinne Rice as Malik Walker, a popular celebrity publicist.

=== Recurring ===
- Jeff Hiller as Phil Miller, a security guard.
- Paulina Porizkova as Ana (season 1), Jimmy's personal stylist.
- Karl Gregory as Marcus Rice, the make-up designer on Nightcap with Jimmy.
- Brendan Clifford as Grady Dupont, the personal chef on Nightcap with Jimmy.
- Jordan Clifford as Brady Dupont (season 2), Grady's identical twin brother who is also a chef.
- Ashley Park as Olivia Cho (season 2), a social media coordinator brought on by Davis.
- Barbara Tirrell as Sonya Yenin (season 2), a worker in the props department.
- Judy Gold as Deb Hafner (season 2), a director on Nightcap with Jimmy.
- Mehmet Oz as himself (season 2)

== Series overview ==
Season	Episodes	Originally released	
Season	Episodes	First released	Last released
1	10	November 16, 2016	January 11, 2017
2	10	June 7, 2017	August 2, 2017

== Episodes ==
=== Season 1 (2016–17) ===
No. overall	No. in season	Title	Written by	Original release date	Prod. code
1	1	"Babymaker"	Brendan Clifford	November 16, 2016	101
Guest stars: Sarah Jessica Parker, Kelly Ripa, Mark Consuelos, Andy Cohen
2	2	"A-List Thief"	Brendan Clifford	November 16, 2016	102
Guest stars: Gwyneth Paltrow, Jim Norton, Nate Berkus
3	3	"Lice-ism"	Brad Wollack	November 23, 2016	103
Guest stars: Whoopi Goldberg, Denis Leary, Jonathan Geffner
4	4	"The Cannon"	Story by : Ali Wentworth; Teleplay by : Tom Brunelle & Brad Wollack	November 30, 2016	104
Guest stars: Michael J. Fox, Tracy Pollan, Jim Gaffigan, The Great Nippulini
5	5	"The Unwanted Guest"	Brad Wollack	December 7, 2016	105
Guest stars: Debra Messing, Mark Cuban, Tim Gunn
6	6	"Mean Guest"	Tom Brunelle	December 14, 2016	106
Guest stars: Jason Biggs, Beth Ostrosky Stern, Keisha Zollar
7	7	"The Horny Host"	Tom Brunelle	December 21, 2016	107
Guest stars: Gigi Gorgeous, Stephanie March, Janeane Garofalo
8	8	"IBS-ISIS"	Ali Wentworth	December 28, 2016	108
Guest stars: Mario Batali, George Stephanopoulos, Aparna Nancherla
9	9	"Go-Fund Yourself"	Tom Brunelle & Brad Wollack & Brendan Clifford	January 4, 2017	109
Guest stars: Paul Rudd, Wendy Williams
10	10	"Guest in a Snake"	Ali Wentworth	January 11, 2017	110
Guest stars: Mariska Hargitay, Joel Schumacher (his final media appearance before his death on June 22, 2020), Rosie Perez.

=== Season 2 (2017) ===
No. overall	No. in season	Title	Written by	Original release date	US viewers (millions)
11	1	"Out of the Box"	Tom Brunelle & Brad Wollack	June 7, 2017	0.136
Guest stars: Julianna Margulies, Mehmet Oz
12	2	"Match Game"	David Bickel	June 7, 2017	0.136
Guest stars: Alec Baldwin, Hilaria Baldwin, Mehmet Oz
13	3	"What Would Staci Do?"	Brendan Clifford	June 14, 2017	0.123
Guest stars: Juju Chang, Kelly Rutherford, Brooke Shields
14	4	"Single White Staci"	Ali Wentworth	June 21, 2017	0.103
Guest stars: Barbara Corcoran, Donny Deutsch, Julianne Moore, Mehmet Oz
15	5	"Always a Beard, Never a Bride"	Elizabeth Rose Quinn	June 28, 2017	0.102
Guest stars: Jesse Tyler Ferguson, Ross Mathews, Michael Strahan
16	6	"Spinster Code"	Elizabeth Rose Quinn	July 5, 2017	0.095
Guest stars: Rachel Bloom, Cedric the Entertainer, Naked Cowboy
17	7	"Poop Show"	Brendan Clifford	July 12, 2017	0.11
Guest stars: Brendan Fraser, Debra Messing
18	8	"Bringing Up Baby"	David Bickel	July 19, 2017	0.089
Guest stars: Carrot Top, Bob Saget
19	9	"The Show Might Go On, Part 1"	David Bickel	July 26, 2017	0.099
Guest stars: Christie Brinkley, Bethenny Frankel, David Hasselhoff, Mehmet Oz
20	10	"The Show Might Go On, Part 2"	Tom Brunelle & Brad Wollack	August 2, 2017	0.072
Guest stars: J. J. Abrams, Christie Brinkley, Mark Hamill, Rachael Ray

== Reception ==
In a mixed review, Robert Lloyd of the Los Angeles Times described the show as "a shaggy, amiable trifle in which character is sometimes subservient to quips." A more favorable review in Variety described the show as "lightweight, rewarding, and extremely watchable comedy."
