= Agapia Stephanopoulos =

American nun and pro-Palestine advocate

Mother Agapia Stephanopoulos
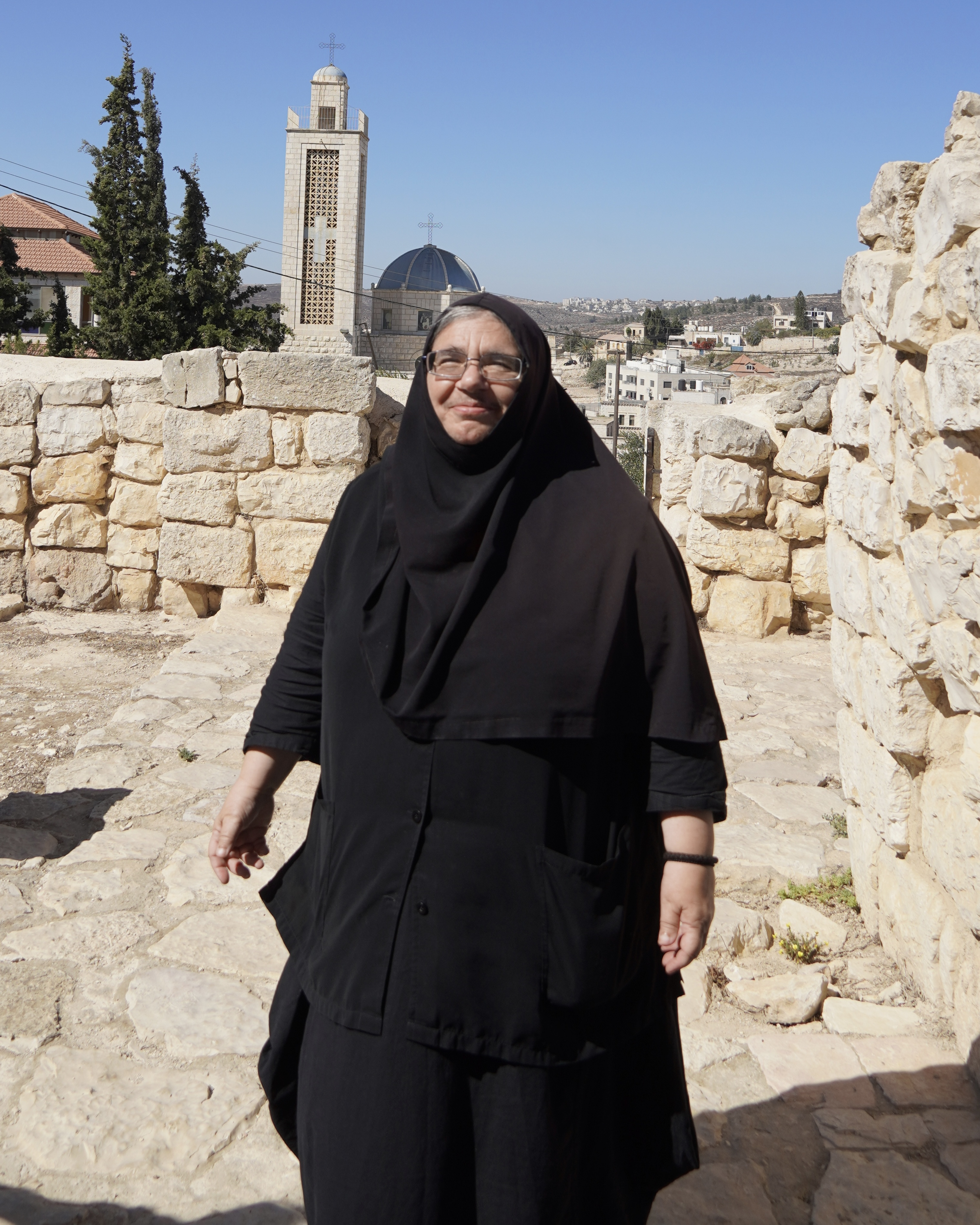
- Born: Anastasia Stephanopoulos; United States
- Education: University of Michigan
- Organization(s): ROCOR (until 2007), ROCOR-A (since)
- Relatives: George Stephanopoulos (brother)
- Website: stnicholasconvent.org

Mother Agapia or Nun Agapia (secular name Anastasia Stephanopoulos; born September 20, 1959) is an American nun of the Eastern Orthodox Church. Currently based in New York, she has been an outspoken advocate for Palestinian Christians and critic of Israeli policy towards Palestinians.

== Early life and education ==
Anastasia Stephanopoulos was born to a Greek Orthodox family in New Jersey. She and her brother, George Stephanopoulos, were both raised Greek Orthodox. Her father, Rev. Robert Stephanopoulos, was pastor of Sts. Constantine and Helen Greek Orthodox Cathedral in Cleveland Heights, Ohio and later dean of the Archdiocesan Cathedral of the Holy Trinity in New York City. Her mother, Nikki Stephanopoulos (1933-2023), was a public affairs officer for the Greek Orthodox Archdiocese of America. Anastasia remained active in the church throughout high school. She graduated from the University of Michigan.

== Religious life ==
Stephanopoulos became interested in ROCOR after visiting Holy Trinity Monastery in Jordanville, New York, an interest which grew in subsequent years. She decided to switch Orthodox Christian jurisdictions and join the Russian Orthodox Church formally, in part because there were no Greek Orthodox convents in the U.S. at the time.

In 1987, Stephanopoulos spent a year as a missionary in Chile. In December 1991, she became a novice at the Community of St. Elizabeth in Jordanville, remaining there for five years and specializing in the monastery's printshop.

In 1996, Stephanopoulus moved to the Convent of St. Mary Magdalene in Jerusalem, remaining in that community for a decade. In September 1998, Stephanopoulos began running the convent's Orthodox Girls' School of Bethany. In 1999, upon taking her final vows and being tonsured, Stephanopoulos took the name Maria.

In late December 1999, Stephanopoulos undertook a hunger strike and began a self-imposed exile to protest the Palestinian Authority's handover of the formerly-ROCOR Jericho Garden Monastery in Jericho to the Russian Orthodox Church. She continued her protest through March 2000. In August 2000, Stephanopoulos visited the United States to lobby for the protection of the girls' school in Bethany from also being handed over to the Russian Orthodox Church.

Stephanopoulos continued to work at the Bethany school through 2002, noting the difficulty in planning lessons as the Israeli military frequently enacted curfews. By 2005, walls and checkpoints erected by the Israeli military made it difficult for the sisters to reach the Bethany school from their convent in East Jerusalem, and for students to attend the school.

In 2006, Stephanopoulos moved to Australia in the midst of her opposition to the planned reuniting of the ROCOR and Russian Orthodox Church, and lived with five other nuns in the outback. The community decided to go along with the reunion, and Stephanopoulos returned to the United States. There, she became Mother Superior of the St. Nicholas Convent in Cleveland, New York. As of 2024, the convent has relocated to Owego, closer to Saint Maximus the Confessor Orthodox Church (GOC).

Stephanopoulos has criticized Israeli military policy, speaking on its adverse effects on Palestinian Christians. She has also criticized Israeli settlements in the West Bank. In August 2025, Stephanopoulos appeared on The Tucker Carlson Show to discuss the lives of Palestinian Christians under current Israeli policy.

== See also ==
- Russian Orthodox Church in Israel
