= Henry Brandon (journalist) =

Czech-born British journalist (1916–1993)

Henry Brandon CBE
- Born: Oscar Henry Brandon; 9 March 1916; Liberec, Bohemia, Austria-Hungary
- Died: 20 April 1993 (aged 77); Bloomsbury, London, England
- Education: University of Prague; University of Lausanne
- Employer: The Sunday Times
- Spouse: Muffie Cabot (m. 1970)
- Children: 1
- Relatives: Ali Wentworth (stepdaughter)

Oscar Henry Brandon CBE (9 March 1916 – 20 April 1993) was a Czech-born British journalist employed by The Sunday Times, who worked for most of his career in Washington.

== Early life ==
Brandon was born in Liberec, then in the Austro-Hungarian Empire, on 9 March 1916 to Oskar Brandeis (1881–1935), a banker, and Ida Brandeis (1881–1942). He was educated at the University of Prague in Czechoslovakia and the University of Lausanne in Switzerland.

== Career ==
Brandon moved to London in 1939 and became a freelance contributor to The Sunday Times. He then served within the newspaper in the posts of war correspondent from 1943 to 1945, Paris correspondent from 1945 to 1946, roving diplomatic correspondent from 1947 to 1949, and most notably, chief Washington correspondent from 1950 to 1983. In that role, he built friendships with prominent figures in US politics, including Henry Kissinger and John F. Kennedy. Brandon was the only foreign correspondent on hand in Dallas at the time of Kennedy's assassination. It was ordered by the US president, Richard Nixon, that Brandon's phone be wiretapped in 1969 as part of the Nixon wiretaps, as, according to the Encyclopædia Britannica, "the extent of his political knowledge was so well known". He was associate editor of The Sunday Times for 20 years, in parallel with his role in Washington, from 1963 to 1983.

After retiring from The Sunday Times, he became a guest scholar in foreign policy studies at the Brookings Institution from 1983 until his death. He also spent time at both The New York Times and The Washington Star as a columnist.

According to his colleague Phillip Knightley, it was "well known among the press pack" that Brandon worked for MI6.

== Personal life ==
On 15 March 1939, the day the Germans occupied the Czech "rump" part of Czechoslovakia, 23-year-old Brandon, a student of world literature and art history at Charles University in Prague, rushed to Bratislava to visit his mother, Ida. He only spent one night in Bratislava. He then hurried to nearby Vienna to travel from there to London. His mother refused to accompany him. She was already fifty-eight years old and no longer in good health. The following morning, they said goodbye to each other at his father's grave and promised to meet again at the same grave. But they never saw each other again. Ida Brandeis died in a concentration camp in 1942. Nevertheless, her name is also on the gravestone in Bratislava. Her son Henry was also buried in this grave.

Brandon married the socialite Mabel Hobart Wentworth, better known as Muffie Cabot, in 1970, with whom he had one daughter. His stepdaughter was Ali Wentworth, an actress who married the TV anchor George Stephanopoulos.

Brandon became a naturalised British citizen. He lived in Washington.

== Death ==
Brandon died at the National Hospital for Neurology and Neurosurgery in Queen Square, in Bloomsbury, on 20 April 1993. Notice of his death, and his cause of death, a stroke, were announced the next day. His body, accompanied by his family, was transferred from London to Bratislava on a special British government plane at the end of April 1993. Brandon rests in the old Jewish cemetery above the Danube next to his father Oskar and mother Ida.

== Honours ==
Brandon was appointed Commander of the Order of British Empire (CBE) in 1985.

== Bibliography ==
External videos
- Booknotes interview with Brandon on Special Relationships, April 30, 1989, C-SPAN

- Brandon, Henry (1966). In the Red: The Struggle for Sterling, 1964-1966. Deutsch. ISBN 978-0714870434.
- Brandon, Henry (1970). Anatomy of Error: The Secret History of the Vietnam War. Deutsch. ISBN 978-0233961859.
- Brandon, Henry (1973). The Retreat of American Power. Doubleday. ISBN 978-0385016551.
- Brandon, Henry (1989). Special Relationships: A Foreign Correspondent's Memoirs from Roosevelt to Reagan. Atheneum. ISBN 978-0689115882.
- Brandon, Henry (1992). In Search of a New World Order: The Future of U.S.-European Relations. Brookings Institution Press. ISBN 978-0815710585.
