= Nixon wiretaps =

Incident in United States politics

In the United States, the Nixon wiretaps were the wiretapping of the phones of 17 journalists and federal government employees suspected of leaking information during the Nixon administration. The wiretaps were active between May 1969 and February 1971. National Security Council staff member Alexander Haig selected many of the targets and received the results of many of the wiretaps. The motivation for the wiretap program was concern from National Security Advisor Henry Kissinger about leaks of classified information.

== Motivation ==
The motivation for the wiretap program was concern from National Security Advisor Henry Kissinger about leaks of classified information. Some of the classified information leaked included the Cambodia campaign (a secret bombing campaign against Cambodia during the Vietnam War), and internal discussions about how forcefully to respond to the 1969 EC-121 shootdown incident (where North Korea shot down an American spy plane).

After the creation of the program, the Nixon administration found the wiretaps useful for gathering political intelligence.

== Creation ==
On April 29, 1969, a meeting between Kissinger, Nixon, Attorney General John N. Mitchell, and Director of the Federal Bureau of Investigation J. Edgar Hoover resulted in a decision to use national security wiretaps. Hoover wrote the appropriate requests and sent them to Mitchell. During a congressional hearing, Kissinger initially denied involvement but then later admitted involvement, and Mitchell denied involvement but his initials on the paperwork were confirmed by a laboratory to be authentic. FBI domestic intelligence official William C. Sullivan was also involved, and Kissinger's aide Alexander Haig would go to Sullivan's office to read the wiretaps.

== Identification of leakers ==
The wiretaps did not uncover any serious leaks. Haig stated that the wiretaps revealed Daniel Davidson, a National Security Council staffer, to be a leaker. Using this information, Haig confronted Davidson, and Davidson left.

== Aftermath ==
The wiretaps were probably legal, but were controversial.

Word of the wiretaps eventually spread to National Security Council staffers and various people that had been wiretapped.

FBI deputy director Mark Felt eventually told Time Magazine about the wiretaps, which informed the public.

In 1973, new FBI director William Ruckelshaus was informed of missing wiretap records from the FBI files and started an inquiry. The inquiry interviewed around 40 persons, lasted seven days, and generated a 15 page report. This report was probably shared with the Senate Judiciary Committee during closed door hearings about whether to impeach Nixon during the Watergate scandal. The files had been taken to the White House, and were eventually found in White House Counsel John Ehrlichman's files.

The Senate Foreign Relations Committee investigated these wiretaps in a closed session in September 1973.

In sealed testimony, Haig testified about the wiretaps to a grand jury during the Watergate scandal.

Haig eventually became Secretary of State under Ronald Reagan, but his appointment to this position was controversial due to this wiretap incident.

== List of wiretapped individuals ==
The following 17 individuals were wiretapped:

1. William Beecher - journalist at The New York Times
2. Henry Brandon - journalist at the London Sunday Times
3. Daniel Davidson - National Security Council staff member
4. Morton Halperin - National Security Council staff member
5. Marvin Kalb - journalist at CBS
6. Anthony Lake - National Security Council staff member
7. Winston Lord - National Security Council staff member
8. James McLane - White House staffer
9. Richard M. Moose - National Security Council staff member
10. Richard F. Pedersen - Department of State
11. Robert E. Pursley - Department of Defense
12. William Safire - White House speech writer
13. John Sears - White House staffer
14. Hedrick Smith - journalist at The New York Times
15. Richard Sneider - National Security Council staff member
16. Helmut Sonnefeldt - National Security Council staff member
17. William H. Sullivan - United States Ambassador to Laos
