= Whitehaven (disambiguation) =

Whitehaven is a town on the coast of Cumbria, England.

Whitehaven or White Haven may also refer to:

== Places ==
- Whitehaven, Ottawa, Ontario, Canada
- Whitehaven, Maryland, U.S.
- Whitehaven, Memphis, Tennessee, U.S.
- Whitehaven (Paducah, Kentucky), U.S., a historic house
- Whitehaven (house), a Clinton family-owned mansion in Washington, D.C., U.S.
- Whitehaven Beach, on Whitsunday Island, Australia
- White Haven (Mer Rouge, Louisiana), U.S., a historic house
- White Haven, Montana, U.S.
- White Haven, Pennsylvania, U.S.
- Ulysses S. Grant National Historic Site, also known as White Haven

== Other uses ==
- Whitehaven (UK Parliament constituency), former parliamentary constituency
- Whitehaven Coal, Australian coal miner
- Whitehaven R.L.F.C., a rugby league team
- Whitehaven A.F.C., an amateur football club
- AMD Whitehaven, codename for the Ryzen Threadripper 1000 series of CPUs by AMD
