= Salvatore A. Angelella =

US Air Force officer (born c. 1959)

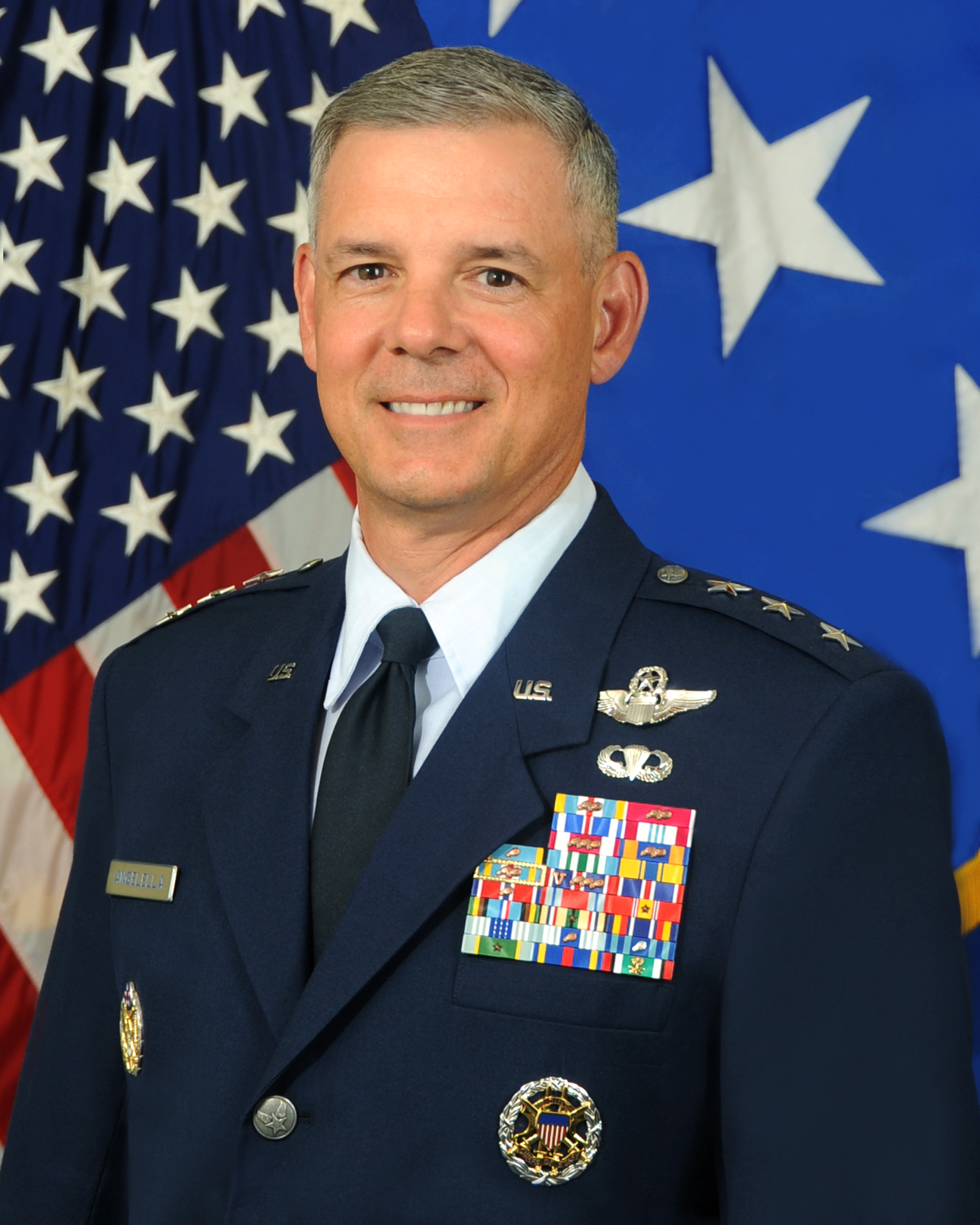
- Lieutenant General Salvatore A. "Sam" Angelella, c. 2012
- Born: c. 1959 (age 66–67)
- Education: United States Air Force Academy (BS); School of Advanced Airpower Studies (MS)
- Military career
- Allegiance: United States
- Branch: United States Air Force
- Service years: 1981–2015
- Rank: Lieutenant General
- Nickname: Sam
- Commands: United States Forces Japan; 5th Air Force; 35th Fighter Wing; 20th Fighter Wing; 332nd Air Expeditionary Wing; 13th Fighter Squadron
- Conflicts: Gulf War
- Awards: Defense Superior Service Medal (2); Legion of Merit (3); Distinguished Flying Cross

Lieutenant General Salvatore A. "Sam" Angelella (born 1959) is a retired United States Air Force officer who last served as commander, United States Forces Japan and commander, 5th Air Force from July 2012 to August 2015. During that assignment, Angelella was the senior United States military representative in Japan and commander of United States Air Force units in Japan.

== Military career ==
Angelella graduated from the United States Air Force Academy in 1981. He has served as an instructor pilot, flight examiner, executive officer, aide-de-camp, flight commander and operations officer. He has commanded the 13th Fighter Squadron at Misawa AB, Japan; 332nd Air Expeditionary Wing in Southwest Asia; 20th Fighter Wing at Shaw Air Force Base, South Carolina; and the 35th Fighter Wing at Misawa AB. He served as the vice commander, 5th Air Force, and deputy commander, 13th Air Force. In addition, he has served on the Air Staff, Joint Staff, United States Pacific Command, and at Supreme Headquarters, Allied Powers Europe. Prior to his final assignment, he was the vice director for strategic plans and policy on the Joint Staff at the Pentagon.

Angelella is a command pilot with over 3,100 flight hours, including 182 combat hours, primarily in the T-38 Talon and F-16 Fighting Falcon.

== Education ==
- 1981 Bachelor of Science degree in engineering mechanics, United States Air Force Academy, Colorado Springs, Colorado
- 1985 Squadron Officer School, Maxwell AFB, Alabama
- 1993 Air Command and Staff College, Maxwell AFB, Alabama
- 1994 Master's degree in airpower art and science, School of Advanced Airpower Studies, Maxwell AFB, Alabama
- 2000 National War College, Fort Lesley J. McNair, Washington, D.C.
- 2007 Joint Force Air Component Commander Course, Maxwell AFB, Alabama
- 2009 Joint Flag Officer Warfighting Course, Maxwell AFB, Ala.

== Military assignments ==
- July 1981 – July 1982, student, undergraduate pilot training, Williams AFB, Arizona
- July 1982 – November 1986, T-38 instructor pilot and flight examiner, 97th Flying Training Squadron, Williams AFB, Arizona
- November 1986 – October 1987, Air Staff Training officer, Headquarters U.S. Air Force, Washington, D.C.
- October 1987 – February 1988, student, lead-in fighter training, Holloman AFB, New Mexico
- February 1988 – November 1988, F-16 student pilot, 56th Tactical Fighter Wing, MacDill AFB, Florida
- November 1988 – October 1991, F-16 instructor pilot and flight commander, 23rd Tactical Fighter Squadron, Spangdahlem AB, Germany
- October 1991 – August 1992, F-16 instructor pilot and life support officer, 61st Fighter Squadron, MacDill AFB, Florida
- August 1992 – June 1993, student, Air Command and Staff College, Maxwell AFB, Alabama
- June 1993 – July 1994, student, School of Advanced Airpower Studies, Maxwell AFB, Alabama
- July 1994 – August 1995, F-16 force structure programmer, Headquarters U.S. Air Force, Washington, D.C.
- August 1995 – June 1996, assistant executive officer, deputy chief of staff for air and space operations, Headquarters U.S. Air Force, Washington, D.C.
- June 1996 – June 1997, aide to the commander, U.S. Forces Japan and 5th Air Force, Yokota AB, Japan
- June 1997 – July 1999, operations officer, later, commander, 13th Fighter Squadron, Misawa AB, Japan
- July 1999 – June 2000, student, National War College, Fort Lesley J. McNair, Washington, D.C.
- June 2000 – July 2001, Theater Warfare Section chief, Warfighting Analysis Division (J-8), Joint Staff, the Pentagon, Washington, D.C.
- July 2001 – August 2002, chief, Studies, Analysis and Gaming Division (J-8), Joint Staff, the Pentagon, Washington, D.C.
- August 2002 – February 2003, commander, 332nd Air Expeditionary Wing, Southwest Asia
- February 2003 – June 2004, commander, 20th Fighter Wing, Shaw AFB, South Carolina
- June 2004 – August 2005, executive assistant to the Supreme Allied Commander Europe, Supreme Headquarters Allied Powers Europe, Belgium
- August 2005 – January 2007, commander, 35th Fighter Wing, Misawa AB, Japan
- January 2007 – January 2009, deputy director, strategic planning and policy, Headquarters U.S. Pacific Command, Camp H. M. Smith, Hawaii
- January 2009 – November 2010, vice commander, 5th Air Force, and deputy commander, 13th Air Force, Yokota AB, Japan
- November 2010 – July 2012, vice director for strategic plans and policy, Joint Staff, the Pentagon, Washington, D.C.
- July 2012 – August 2015, commander, U.S. Forces Japan, and commander, 5th Air Force, Pacific Air Forces, Yokota AB, Japan

== Effective dates of promotion ==
Insignia	Rank	Date of rank
	Second lieutenant	27 May 1981
	First lieutenant	27 May 1983
	Captain	27 May 1985
	Major	1 May 1993
	Lieutenant colonel	1 December 1997
	Colonel	1 April 2001
	Brigadier general	24 November 2006
	Major general	4 December 2009
	Lieutenant general	20 July 2012
