= Fifth Air Force =

Numbered air force of the United States Air Force responsible for the Japanese region

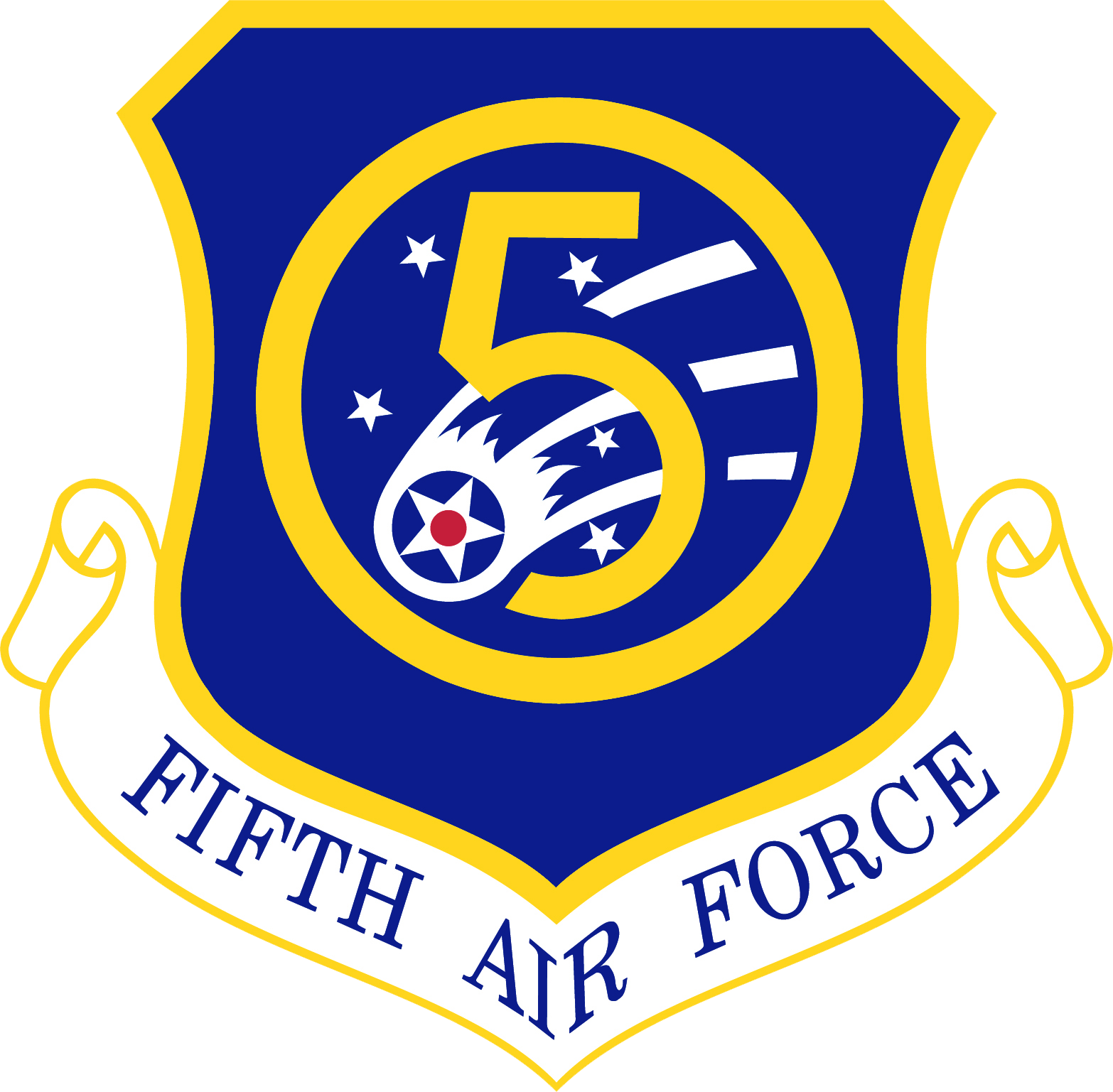
- Shield of the Fifth Air Force
- Active: 5 February 1942 – present (as Fifth Air Force); 5 February 1942 – 18 September 1942 (as 5 Air Force); 28 October 1941 – 5 February 1942 (Far Eastern Air Force); 16 August 1941 – 28 October 1941 (as Philippine Department Air Force) (84 years, 10 months)
- Country: United States
- Branch: United States Air Force (18 September 1947 – present); United States Army ( Army Air Forces, 16 August 1941 – 18 September 1947)
- Type: Numbered Air Force
- Role: Provide combat-ready air forces for U.S. Pacific Command and U.S. Forces Japan, along with serving as the air component for U.S. Forces Japan
- Part of: Pacific Air Forces; U.S. Indo-Pacific Command; U.S. Forces Japan
- Headquarters: Yokota Air Base, Tokyo Metropolis, Japan
- Engagements: See list: World War II - Asiatic-Pacific Theater; Philippines Campaign; East Indies; Papua; New Guinea; Bismark Archipelago; Leyte; Luzon; Southern Philippines Korean War; UN Defenseive; UN Offensive; CCF Intervention; First UN Counteroffensive; CCF Spring Offensive; UN Summer-Fall Offensive; Second Korean Winter; Summer-Fall 1952; Third Korean Winter; Summer-Fall 1953

- Decorations: See list: Distinguished Unit Citation; Philippine Islands; Papua Air Force Outstanding Unit Award Philippine Presidential Unit Citation Korean Presidential Unit Citation
- Website: 5af.pacaf.af.mil

Commanders
- Commander: Lt Gen Joel Carey
- Deputy Commander: Brig Gen John M. Schutte
- Command Chief: CMSgt Shaun E. Campbell
- Notable commanders: George Kenney; Earle E. Partridge; Samuel E. Anderson; Glenn O. Barcus; Richard B. Myers

The Fifth Air Force (5 AF) is a numbered Air Force of the United States Air Force Pacific Air Forces (PACAF). Founded in September 1941 and headquartered at Yokota Air Base, Japan, it is the service’s oldest continuously serving numbered Air Force.

Fifth Air Force is the Headquarters Pacific Air Forces forward element in Japan and the air component to United States Forces Japan. It plans, conducts, controls, and coordinates air operations assigned by the PACAF commander. It maintains readiness for such operations. It increases regional stability by planning, exercising, and executing joint air operations with Japan.

== History ==

Fourteen Boeing B-17 Flying Fortresses that survived the Battle of the Philippines left Mindanao for Darwin, Australia, between 17 and 20 December 1941, the only aircraft of the Far East Air Force to escape. After its evacuation from the Philippines on 24 December 1941, FEAF headquarters moved to Australia and was reorganized and redesignated 5 Air Force on 5 February 1942, with most of its combat aircraft based on fields on Java. It seemed at the time that the Japanese were advancing just about everywhere. The remaining heavy bombers of the 19th Bombardment Group, based at Malang on Java, flew missions against the Japanese in an attempt to stop their advance. They were joined in January and February, two or three at a time, by 37 B-17Es and 12 LB-30s of the 7th Bombardment Group. The small force of bombers, never numbering more than 20 operational at any time, could do little to prevent the invasion of the Netherlands East Indies, launching valiant but futile attacks against the masses of Japanese shipping, with six lost in combat, six in accidents, and 26 destroyed on the ground.

The 7th Bombardment Group was withdrawn to India in March 1942, leaving the 19th to carry on as the only B-17 Fortress-equipped group in the South Pacific. About this time it was decided that replacement B-17s would not be sent to the southwest Pacific, but be sent exclusively to the Eighth Air Force which was building up in England. By May, Fifth Air Force's surviving personnel and aircraft were detached to other commands and the headquarters remained unmanned for several months, but elements played a small part in the Battle of the Coral Sea (7–8 May 1942) when the 435th Bomb Squadron of the 19th Bomb Group saw the Japanese fleet gathering in Rabaul area nearly two weeks before the battle actually took place. Because of the reconnaissance activity of the 435th Bomb Squadron, the US Navy was prepared to cope adequately with the situation. The squadron was commended by the US Navy for its valuable assistance not only for its excellent reconnaissance work but for the part played in the battle.

=== 39th Fighter Squadron, 35th Fighter Group ===
The situation in New Guinea during June of 1942, was critical. Port Moresby was the last remaining Allied foothold on the island and the Japanese seemed determined to take it at all costs. After their victory in the Java Sea Battle, in March of 1942, the enemy swarmed down through New Guinea’s northern coast like locusts—taking Wewak, Rabaul, Madang and Lae in quick succession. Following the capture of Lae the Japanese staged, by June, two determined attempts to take Port Moresby. In their first attempt they tried to move overland from Salamaua and Lae through the Owen and Stanley Range, but their forces bogged down in the heavy rains of the Markham Valley. The second attempt was a naval attack to cut Moresby off from Australia and land sea-borne troops on the southern coasts of the island.

Headquarters Fifth Air Force was re-staffed at Brisbane, Australia on 18 September 1942 and placed under the command of Major General George Kenney. United States Army Air Forces units in Australia, including Fifth Air Force, were eventually reinforced and re-organised following their initial defeats in the Philippines and the East Indies. At the time that Kenney had arrived, Fifth Air Force was equipped with three fighter groups and five bombardment groups.

Fighter Groups:

- 8th FG (P-39) Townsville, Australia
- 35th FG (P-40) Port Moresby, New Guinea
- 49th FG (P-40) Darwin, Australia

Bomber Groups:

- 3rd BG (B-25, A-20, & A-24) Charters Towers, Australia
- 19th BG (Non-Operational. Battle scarred from Philippines & Java) Mareeba, Australia
- 22nd BG (B-26) Woodstock, Australia
- 38th BG (B-25) Charters Towers, Australia
- 43rd BG (B-17 until 1943; B-24 1943–1945) Port Moresby, New Guinea

In addition, Fifth Air Force controlled two transport squadrons and one photographic squadron comprising 1,602 officers and 18,116 men.

Kenney was later appointed commander of Allied air forces in the South West Pacific Area, reporting directly to General Douglas MacArthur. Under Kenney's leadership, the Fifth Air Force and Royal Australian Air Force provided the aerial spearhead for MacArthur's island hopping campaign.

=== US Far East Air Forces ===
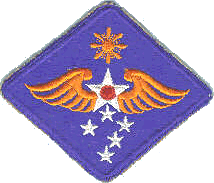

On 4 November 1942, the Fifth Air Force commenced sustained action against the Japanese in Papua New Guinea and was a key component of the New Guinea campaign (1942–1945). Fifth Air Force engaged the Japanese again in the Philippines campaign (1944–45) as well as in the Battle of Okinawa (1945).

Fifth Air Force along with Thirteenth Air Force in the Central Pacific and Seventh Air Force in Hawaii were assigned to the newly created United States Far East Air Forces (FEAF) on 3 August 1944. FEAF was subordinate to the U.S. Army Forces Far East and served as the headquarters of Allied Air Forces Southwest Pacific Area. By 1945, the three numbered air forces were supporting operations throughout the Pacific. FEAF was the functional equivalent in the Pacific of the United States Strategic Air Forces (USSTAF) in the European Theater of Operations.

=== Order of battle, 1945 ===
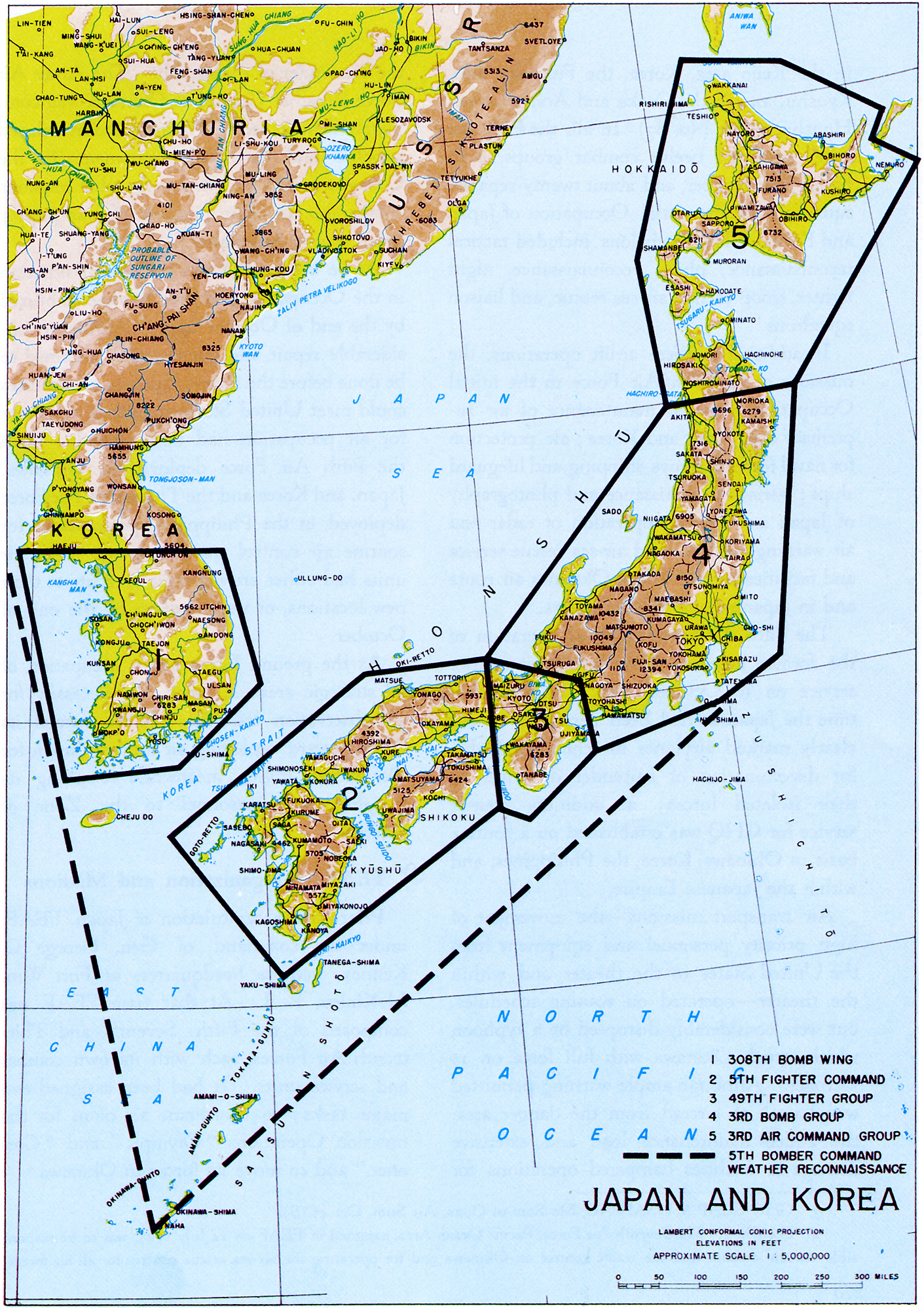
Fifth U.S. Air Force Zones of Responsibility, 1945–1947

V Fighter Command	Night Fighter Units	V Bomber Command	Photo Reconnaissance	54th Troop Carrier Wing
3d ACG (P-51, C-47)	418th NFS	3d BG (L) (B-25, A-20)	6th RG (F-5, F-7)	2d CCG
8th FG (P-40, P-38)	421st NFS	22d BG (M/H) (B-26 – B-24)	71st RG (B-25)	317th TCG
35th FG (P-47, P-51)	547th NFS	38th BG (M) (B-25)		374th TCG (1943 only)
49th FG (P-40, P-47, P-38)		43d BG (H) (B-24)		375th TCG
58th FG (P-47)		90th BG (H) (B-24)		433d TCG
348th FG (P-47, P-51)		312th BG (L) (A-20)		
475th FG (P-38)		345th BG (M) (B-25)		
		380th BG (H) (B-24)		
		417th BG (L) (A-20)		

LEGEND: ACG – Air Commando Group, FG – Fighter Group, NFS – Night Fighter Squadron, BG (L) – Light Bomb Group, BG (M) – Medium Bomb Group, BG (H) – Heavy Bomb Group, RG – Reconnaissance Group, CCG – Combat Cargo Group, TCG – Troop Carrier Group

When the war ended, Fifth Air Force had an unmatched record of 3,445 aerial victories, led by the nation's two top fighter aces Major Richard Bong and Major Thomas McGuire, with 40 and 38 confirmed victories respectively, and two of Fifth Air Force's ten Medal of Honor recipients.

Shortly after World War II ended in August, Fifth Air Force relocated to Irumagawa Air Base, Japan, about 25 September 1945 as part of the Allied occupation forces. The command remained in Japan until 1 December 1950 performing occupation duties.

=== Korean War ===
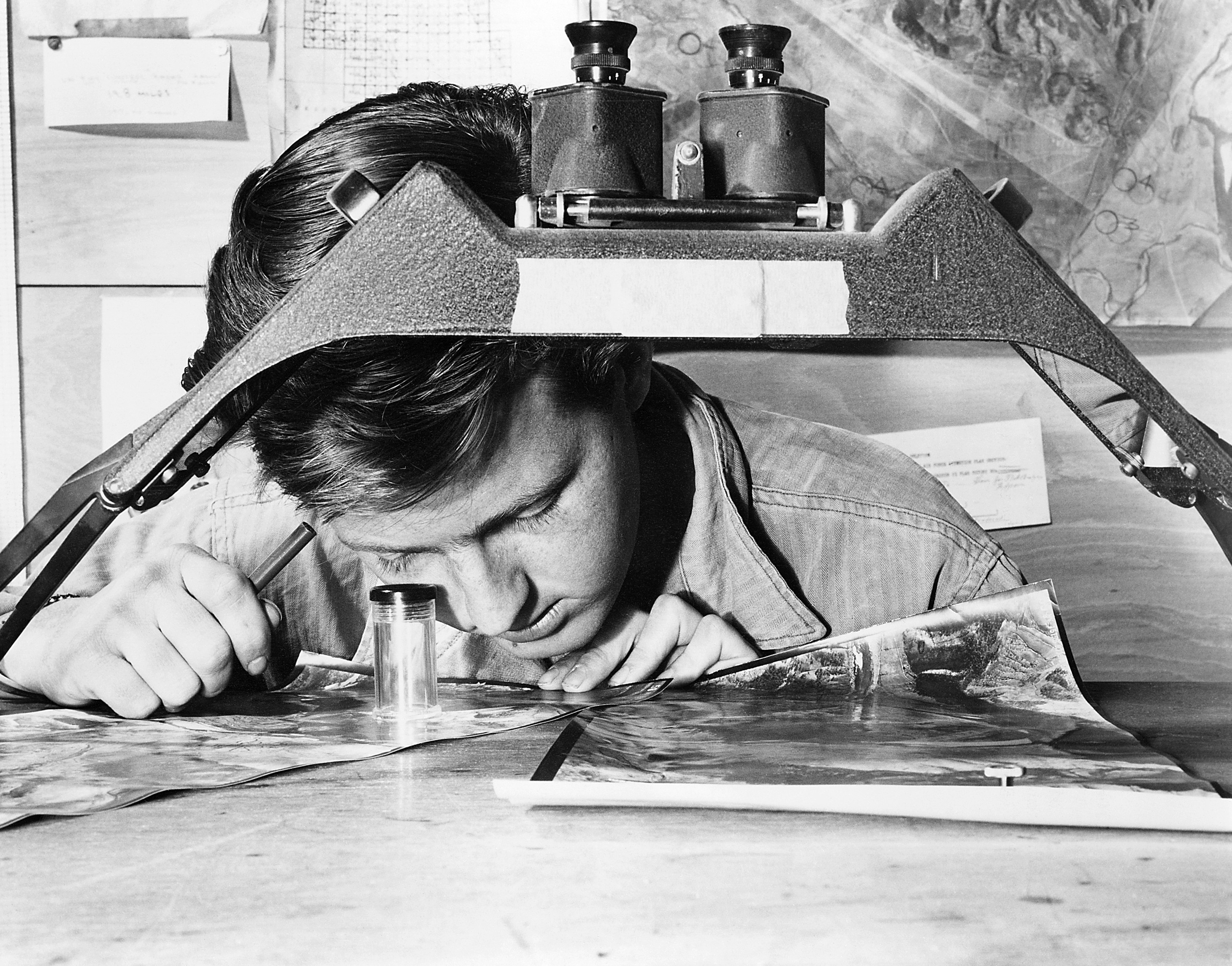
Fifth Air Force photographic analyst elucidates the location of enemy flak batteries to plan fighter-bomber attacks, 1952

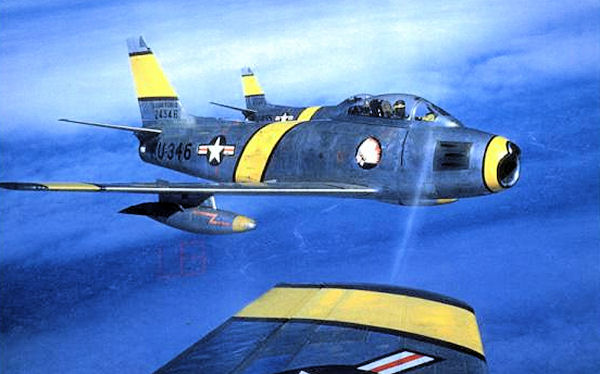
North American F-86F-25-NH Sabres of the 4th FIW over Korea. Serial 52-5346 identifiable

In 1950, Fifth Air Force was called upon again, becoming the main United Nations Command combat air command during the Korean War, and assisted in bringing about the Korean Armistice Agreement that formally ended the war in 1953.

In the early morning hours of 25 June, North Korea launched a sudden, all-out attack against the south. Reacting quickly to the invasion, Fifth Air Force units provided air cover over the skies of Seoul. The command transferred to Seoul on 1 December 1950, remaining in South Korea until 1 September 1954.

In this first Jet War, units assigned to the Fifth Air Force racked up an unprecedented 14.5 to 1 victory ratio. By the time the truce was signed in 1953, Fifth Air Force had flown over 625,000 missions, downing 953 North Korean and Chinese aircraft, while close air support accounted for 47 percent of all enemy troop casualties.

Thirty-eight fighter pilots were identified as aces, including Lieutenant Colonel James Jabara, America's first jet ace; and Captain Joseph McConnell, the leading Korean War ace with 16 confirmed victories. Additionally, four Medals of Honor were awarded to Fifth Air Force members. One other pilot of note was Marine Major John Glenn, who flew for Fifth Air Force as part of an exchange program.

With the end of combat in Korea, Fifth Air Force returned to normal peacetime readiness Japan in 1954. It was estimated that she had 1200 killed in action and 368 wounded during this war.

=== Cold War ===
The Fifth Air Force played a critical role in establishing the Japan Air Self-Defense Force as well as the Republic of Korea Air Force. These and other peacetime efforts lasted a decade before the Gulf of Tonkin Crisis led to the start of the Vietnam War.

The Fifth Air Force furnished aircraft, aircrews, Support personnel, and supplies throughout the eight years of combat operations in South Vietnam and Laos. Since 1972, the command has played active or supporting roles in a variety of issues ranging from being first on the scene at the Korean Air Lines Flight 007 shoot down in 1983 to deploying personnel and supplies for the Persian Gulf War in 1990.

During this time, the size of Fifth Air Force changed as well. With the activation of Seventh Air Force in 1986, fifth left the Korean Peninsula and focused its energy on continuing the growing bilateral relationship with Japan.

The Fifth Air force has responded to natural disasters in Japan and abroad, including the Great Hanshin earthquake in 1995 and Super Typhoon Paka in Guam in 1997. Fifth Air Force has reached out to provide assistance to victims of floods, typhoons, volcanoes, and earthquakes throughout the region.

The 432d Tactical Fighter Wing flew F-16s from Misawa Air Base from July 1, 1984 – October 31, 1994. On the inactivation of the wing, its personnel, aircraft, and other assets were used to reform the 35th Fighter Wing.

== Present ==
As of late 2024, the Fifth Air Force’s major components include the 18th Wing, Kadena Air Base, Okinawa Prefecture, Japan; the 35th Fighter Wing at Misawa Air Base, and the 374th Airlift Wing at Yokota Air Base. Kadena AB hosts the 18th Wing, the service's largest combat wing, which includes F-15 fighters, Boeing KC-135 aerial refuelling aircraft, E-3 Airborne Warning and Control System aircraft, and HH-60G Pave Hawk rescue helicopters. The 35th Fighter Wing, Misawa Air Base, Japan, includes two F-16 squadrons that fly the Block 50 variant dedicated to the suppression of enemy air defenses. The 374th Airlift Wing is based at Yokota Air Base, Japan.

A 2017 study by two US Navy commanders concluded that a surprise Chinese ballistic missile attack against airbases in Japan would destroy more than 200 U.S. aircraft on the ground.

== Lineage, assignments, stations, and components ==
=== Lineage ===
- Established as Philippine Department Air Force on 16 August 1941

Activated on 20 September 1941
Redesignated: Far East Air Force on 16 November 1941
Redesignated: 5 Air Force on 5 February 1942
Redesignated: Fifth Air Force* on 18 September 1942.

Fifth Air Force is not to be confused with a second "Fifth" air force created as a temporary establishment to handle combat operations after the outbreak of hostilities on 25 June 1950, in Korea. This numbered air force was established as Fifth Air Force, Advance, and organized at Itazuki AB, Japan, assigned to Fifth Air Force, on 14 July 1950. It moved to Taegu AB, South Korea, on 24 July 1950, and was redesignated Fifth Air Force in Korea at the same time. After moving, it apparently received command control from U.S. Far East Air Forces. The establishment operated from Pusan, Taegu, and Seoul before being discontinued on 1 December 1950.

=== Assignments ===
- Philippine Department, U.S. Army, 20 September 1941
- US Forces in Australia (USFIA), 23 December 1941

Redesignated: US Army Forces in Australia (USAFIA), 5 January 1942

- American-British-Dutch-Australian Command (ABDACOM), 23 February 1942
- Allied Air Force, Southwest Pacific Area (SWPA), 2 November 1942
- Far East Air Forces (Provisional), 15 June 1944
- Far East Air Forces, 3 August 1944

Redesignated: Pacific Air Command, United States Army, 6 December 1945
Redesignated: Far East Air Forces, 1 January 1947
Redesignated Pacific Air Forces, 1 July 1957—present

=== Stations ===
- Nichols Field, Luzon, 20 September 1941
- RAAF Base Darwin, Australia, 31 December 1941
- Bandoeng, Java, 18 January 1942
- Brisbane AAB, Australia, c 1 March 1942
- Nadzab Airfield, New Guinea, 15 June 1944
- Owi Airfield, Schouten Islands, Netherlands East Indies, 10 August 1944
- Bayug Airfield, Leyte, Philippines, c. 20 November 1944
- McGuire Field, Mindoro, Philippines, January 1945
- Clark Field, Luzon, Philippines, April 1945
- Hamasaki (Motobu Airfield), Okinawa, 4 August 1945
- Irumagawa AB, Japan, c. 25 September 1945
- Tokyo, Japan, 13 January 1946
- Nagoya, Japan, 20 May 1946
- Seoul AB (K-16), Korea, 1 December 1950
- Taegu AB (K-2), Korea, 22 December 1950
- Seoul AB (K-16), 15 June 1951
- Osan AB, Korea, 25 January 1954
- Nagoya AB (later, Nagoya AS; Moriyama AS), Japan, 1 September 1954
- Fuchu AS, Japan, 1 July 1957
- Yokota AB, Japan, 11 November 1974–present

=== Major components ===
Commands

- V Air Force Service: 18 June 1943 – 15 June 1944
- V Air Service Area: 9 January 1944 – 15 June 1944
- 5 Bomber (later, V Bomber): 14 November 1941 – 31 May 1946
- V Fighter: 25 August 1942 – 31 May 1946
- 5 Interceptor: 4 November 1941 – 6 April 1942

Became Army Air Force Infantry unit during Battle of the Philippines (1941–42) (20 December 1941 – 9 April 1942)

- Far East Air Service (later, 5 Air Force Base; V Air Force Base): 28 October 1941 – 2 November 1942

Divisions

- 39th Air Division: 1 September 1954 – 15 January 1968
- 41st Air Division: 1 September 1954 – 15 January 1968
- 43d Air Division: 1 September 1954 – 1 October 1957
- 313th Air Division: 1 March 1955 – 1 October 1991
- 314th Air Division: 31 May 1946 – 1 March 1950; 1 December 1950 – 18 May 1951; 15 March 1955 – 8 September 1986
- 315 Air Division (formerly, 315 Composite Wing): 1 June 1946 – 1 March 1950.

Wings (incomplete listing)

- 8th Fighter Wing, later 8th Tactical Fighter Wing, 1950s
- 18th Wing: 1 Oct 1991-.
- 35th Fighter Wing: 1 Oct 1994-.
- 51st Fighter Wing: 1955-September 1986
- 374th Airlift Wing: 1 Apr 1992-.
- 432d Tactical Fighter Wing, Misawa Air Base, Japan: July 1, 1984 – May 31, 1991; 432d Fighter Wing from June 1, 1991 - October 31, 1994 (wing personnel and assets thereafter used to reactivate 35th Fighter Wing)
- 6100th Support Wing, Tachikawa Air Base, Japan: "Brigadier General Thomas R. FORD Replaced Col. Lewis B. MENG as commander of 6100th Support Wing effective" 11 June 1962. "6100 Support Wing was Major Air Command control (MAJCON) unit directly subordinate to Headquarters (HQ) 5 Air Force. Contains.. functions of various subordinate elements of 6100 Support Wing (Kanto Base Command)."

Groups

- 2nd Combat Cargo Group: October 1944-15 January 1946

== List of commanders ==
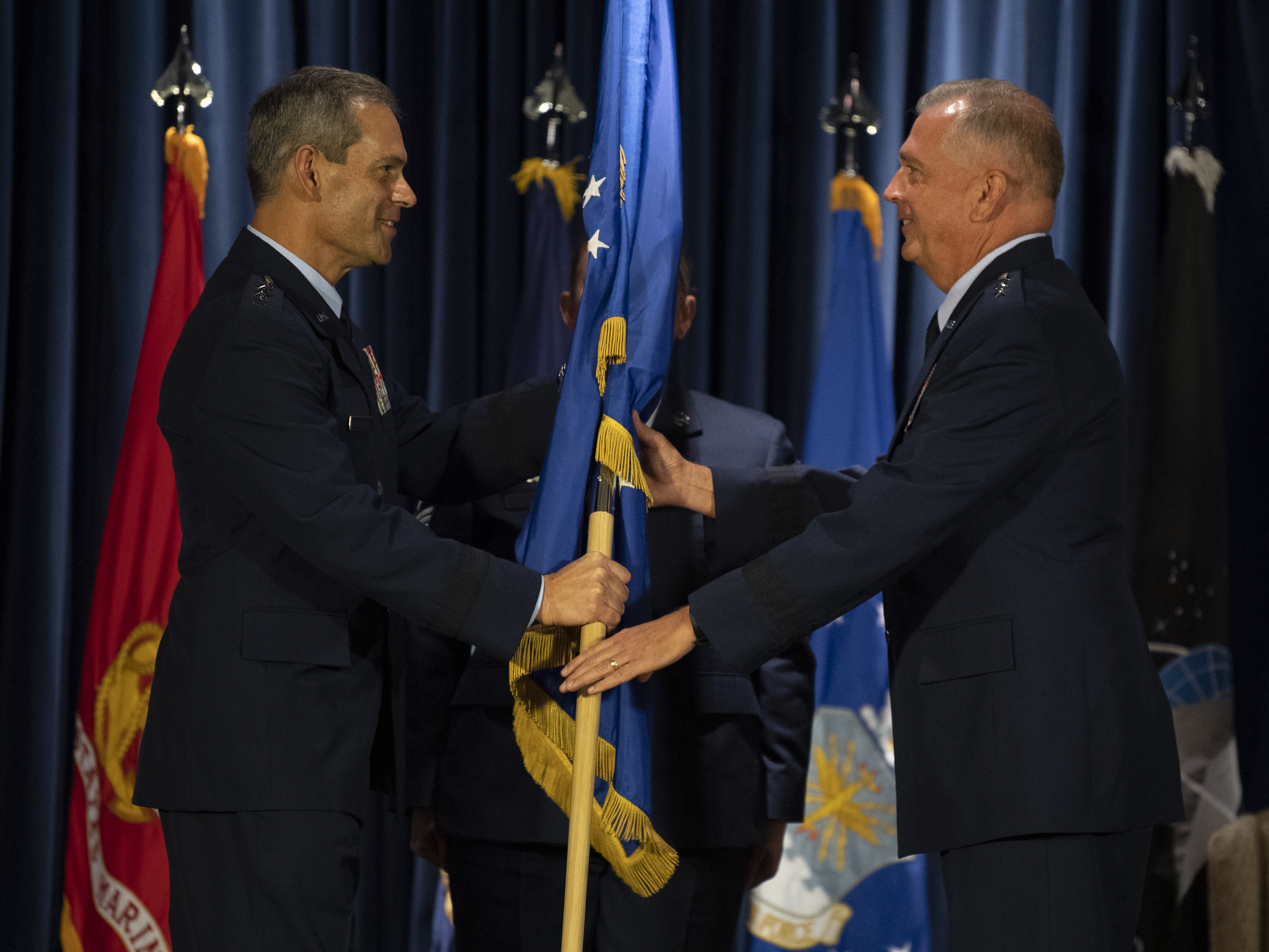
Incoming Fifth Air Force commander, Lt. Gen. Ricky Rupp receives the command guidon from Gen. Kenneth S. Wilsbach, commander of the Pacific Air Forces, on 26 August 2021.

No.	Commander		Term		
No.	Portrait	Name	Took office	Left office	Term length
1	Henry B. Clagett	Brigadier General; Henry B. Clagett	20 September 1941	7 October 1941	17 days
2	Lewis H. Brereton	Major General; Lewis H. Brereton	7 October 1941	24 February 1942	140 days
3	George C. Kenney	Lieutenant General; George C. Kenney	3 September 1942	15 June 1944	1 year, 286 days
4	Ennis C. Whitehead	Lieutenant General; Ennis C. Whitehead	15 June 1944	4 October 1945	1 year, 111 days
5	Kenneth B. Wolfe	Major General; Kenneth B. Wolfe	4 October 1945	16 January 1948	2 years, 104 days
6	Thomas D. White	Major General; Thomas D. White	16 January 1948	6 October 1948	264 days
7	Earle E. Partridge	Lieutenant General; Earle E. Partridge	6 October 1948	21 May 1951	2 years, 227 days
8	Edward J. Timberlake	Major General; Edward J. Timberlake	21 May 1951	1 June 1951	11 days
9	Frank F. Everest	Major General; Frank F. Everest	1 June 1951	30 May 1952	364 days
10	Glenn O. Barcus	Lieutenant General; Glenn O. Barcus	30 May 1952	31 May 1953	1 year, 1 day
11	Samuel E. Anderson	Lieutenant General; Samuel E. Anderson	31 May 1953	1 June 1954	1 year, 1 day
12	Roger M. Ramey	Lieutenant General; Roger M. Ramey	1 June 1954	20 June 1956	2 years, 19 days
13	Frederic H. Smith Jr.	Lieutenant General; Frederic H. Smith Jr.	20 June 1956	4 August 1958	2 years, 45 days
14	Robert W. Burns	Lieutenant General; Robert W. Burns	4 August 1958	6 July 1961	2 years, 336 days
-	Robert F. Tate	Major General; Robert F. Tate; Acting	6 July 1961	2 August 1961	27 days
15	Jacob E. Smart	Lieutenant General; Jacob E. Smart	2 August 1961	30 July 1963	1 year, 362 days
16	Maurice A. Preston	Lieutenant General; Maurice A. Preston	30 July 1963	1 August 1966	3 years, 2 days
17	Seth J. McKee	Lieutenant General; Seth J. McKee	1 August 1966	13 July 1968	1 year, 347 days
18	Thomas K. McGehee	Lieutenant General; Thomas K. McGehee	13 July 1968	24 February 1970	1 year, 226 days
19	Gordon M. Graham	Lieutenant General; Gordon M. Graham	24 February 1970	15 November 1972	2 years, 265 days
20	Robert E. Pursley	Lieutenant General; Robert E. Pursley	15 November 1972	1 March 1974	1 year, 106 days
-	Edward P. McNeff	Major General; Edward P. McNeff; Acting	1 March 1974	8 May 1974	68 days
21	Walter T. Galligan	Lieutenant General; Walter T. Galligan	8 May 1974	22 June 1977	3 years, 45 days
22	George G. Loving Jr.	Lieutenant General; George G. Loving Jr.	22 June 1977	14 June 1979	1 year, 357 days
23	William H. Ginn Jr.	Lieutenant General; William H. Ginn Jr.	14 June 1979	5 August 1981	2 years, 52 days
24	Charles L. Donnelly Jr.	Lieutenant General; Charles L. Donnelly Jr.	5 August 1981	19 July 1984	2 years, 349 days
25	Edward L. Tixier	Lieutenant General; Edward L. Tixier	19 July 1984	22 January 1988	3 years, 187 days
26	James B. Davis	Lieutenant General; James B. Davis	22 January 1988	18 July 1991	3 years, 177 days
-	James M. Johnston III	Brigadier General; James M. Johnston III; Acting	18 July 1991	9 August 1991	22 days
27	Richard E. Hawley	Lieutenant General; Richard E. Hawley	9 August 1991	13 November 1993	2 years, 96 days
28	Richard B. Myers	Lieutenant General; Richard B. Myers	13 November 1993	18 June 1996	2 years, 218 days
29	Ralph E. Eberhart	Lieutenant General; Ralph E. Eberhart	18 June 1996	27 June 1997	1 year, 9 days
30	John B. Hall Jr.	Lieutenant General; John B. Hall Jr.	27 June 1997	3 September 1999	2 years, 68 days
31	Paul V. Hester	Lieutenant General; Paul V. Hester	3 September 1999	19 November 2001	2 years, 77 days
32	Thomas C. Waskow	Lieutenant General; Thomas C. Waskow	19 November 2001	10 February 2005	3 years, 83 days
33	Bruce A. Wright	Lieutenant General; Bruce A. Wright	10 February 2005	25 February 2008	3 years, 15 days
34	Edward A. Rice Jr.	Lieutenant General; Edward A. Rice Jr.	25 February 2008	October 2010	~2 years, 218 days
35	Burton M. Field	Lieutenant General; Burton M. Field	October 2010	20 July 2012	~1 year, 293 days
36	Salvatore A. Angelella	Lieutenant General; Salvatore A. Angelella	20 July 2012	5 June 2015	2 years, 320 days
37	John L. Dolan	Lieutenant General; John L. Dolan	5 June 2015	6 October 2016	1 year, 123 days
38	Jerry P. Martinez	Lieutenant General; Jerry P. Martinez	6 October 2016	5 February 2019	2 years, 122 days
39	Kevin B. Schneider	Lieutenant General; Kevin B. Schneider	5 February 2019	27 August 2021	2 years, 203 days
40	Ricky N. Rupp	Lieutenant General; Ricky N. Rupp	27 August 2021	8 October 2024	3 years, 42 days
41	Stephen F. Jost	Lieutenant General; Stephen F. Jost	8 October 2024	24 March 2026	1 year, 167 days
42	Joel Carey	Lieutenant General; Joel Carey	24 March 2026	Incumbent	99 days

== See also ==
- United States Army Air Forces in Australia
