= Ali Wentworth =

American actress (born 1965)

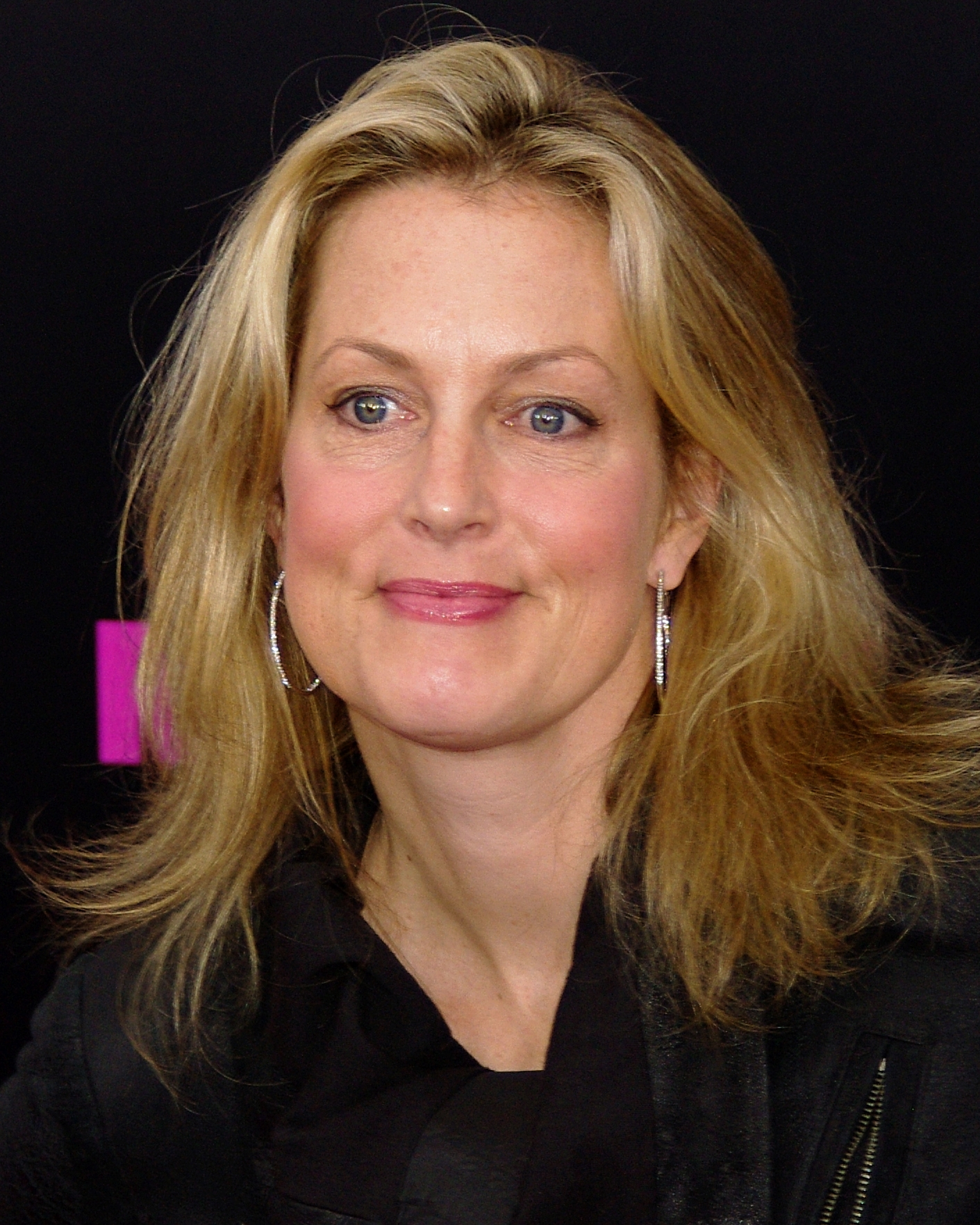
- Wentworth at the 2012 premiere of What to Expect When You're Expecting
- Born: January 12, 1965 (age 61); Washington, D.C., U.S.
- Education: New York University (BA)
- Occupations: Actress; comedienne; author; producer
- Years active: 1992–present
- Spouse: George Stephanopoulos (m. 2001)
- Children: 2
- Mother: Muffie Cabot
- Relatives: Henry Brandon (stepfather); Janet Elliott Wulsin (grandmother)

Alexandra Wentworth (born January 12, 1965) is an American actress, comedian, author, and producer.

== Early life ==
Wentworth's mother, Muffie Cabot (née Mabel Bryant Hobart), was Nancy Reagan's White House social secretary from 1981 to 1983. Her father, Eric Wentworth, was a reporter for The Washington Post. Her stepfather, Henry Brandon, was the Washington correspondent for The Sunday Times of London and her maternal grandmother was Janet Elliott Wulsin.

Wentworth attended the Dana Hall School for Girls in Wellesley, Massachusetts, and studied drama at Bard College in Annandale-on-Hudson, New York before graduating from New York University.

== Career ==
Wentworth debuted as a cast member on the Fox sketch comedy series In Living Color from 1992 to 1994. On the program she was known for performing impressions of Cher, Amy Fisher, Hillary Clinton, Cindy Crawford, Princess Diana, Brooke Shields, Lisa Marie Presley, Sharon Stone, and other characters. Her recurring characters included Candy Cane, a deranged kids' show host who had had a string of bad relationships with her male coworkers, and the promiscuous teenage daughter of Grandpa Jack McGee (Jim Carrey) on The Dysfunctional Home Show.

Wentworth made appearances as a correspondent on The Tonight Show with Jay Leno and The Oprah Winfrey Show. In 1995, she played Jerry Seinfeld's girlfriend Sheila ("Schmoopie") in the memorable "Soup Nazi" episode of Seinfeld. She had a recurring role as the boss of the title character on the WB series Felicity.

In 2003, she co-hosted the syndicated talk show Living It Up! with Ali & Jack with Jack Ford. Since that show's cancellation and before, she has been a regular part of the guest host rotation for Live with Kelly and Ryan when Kelly Ripa is on vacation or has other commitments.

Wentworth wrote 28 episodes of and starred in the comedy Head Case on the Starz television network. She guest starred on the NBC show The Marriage Ref. She hosted Daily Shot, a short daily talk show segment on Yahoo! Shine.

In 2016, Wentworth created and starred in Nightcap as the lead character Staci Cole. The series was broadcast for two seasons.

Wentworth appeared as a celebrity guest on the July 23, 2017 episode (S2 E07) of The $100,000 Pyramid, opposite Kathy Najimy, helping her contestant partner win the $150,000 grand prize. In 2020, Wentworth launched a podcast Go Ask Ali in partnership with shondaland audio. In 2022, she published a book, Ali's Well That Ends Well, about finding humor in the COVID-19 pandemic.

In 2021, Wentworth, George Stephanopoulos, and Alyssa Mastromonaco founded the production company BedBy8. The first project, an ABC News Studio collaboration with Madator Content was Pretty Baby: Brooke Shields. The docuseries first premiered at Sundance, followed by Hulu.

In 2022, Wentworth co-hosted an ABC reality show, The Parent Test, with Adolph Brown.

== Personal life ==
Wentworth is married to George Stephanopoulos, ABC News chief anchor, correspondent and former political adviser to the Clinton administration. They met on a blind date in April 2001 and were engaged two months later. They married on November 20, 2001, at the Archdiocesan Cathedral of the Holy Trinity on New York City's Upper East Side, where they reside. They have two daughters.

In an episode of Comedians in Cars Getting Coffee, Wentworth said a "well-known writer" once offered $40,000 to spend a night with her.

== Bibliography ==
- The WASP Cookbook, Warner Adult, 1997. ISBN 978-0-446-91210-5.
- Ali in Wonderland: And Other Tall Tales, 2012, Harper Collins ISBN 978-0-06-209809-2
- Happily Ali After: And Other Fairly True Tales, HarperCollins, 2015. ISBN 978-0-062-23849-8. ISBN 0062238493.
- Go Ask Ali: Half-Baked Advice (and Free Lemonade), Harper, 2018. ISBN 978-0062466013.
- Ali's Well that Ends Well, HarperCollins, 2022. ISBN 978-0063242166

== Filmography ==
Year	Title	Role	Notes
1992-1994	In Living Color	Various	63 episodes
1994	Hardball	Lee Emory	
1995	Seinfeld	Sheila	1 episode
1996	Life Among the Cannibals	Suicidal Singer	
1996	Big Packages	Susan	
1996	Jerry Maguire	Bobbi Fallon	
1997	Trial and Error	Tiffany Whitfield	
1997	The Real Blonde	Raina	
1997	The Love Bug	Alex Woodward	TV movie
1999	Office Space	Anne	
1999	Felicity	Abby	2 episodes
2000	Meeting Daddy	Melanie Branson	
2001	Call Me Claus	Lucy	
2009	It's Complicated	Diane	
2009	Who Wants to Be a Millionaire?	Self	5 episodes
2012–2014	Daily Shot With Ali Wentworth	Self	
2013	Breathe In	Wendy	
2014	Comedians in Cars Getting Coffee	Self	Season 5, episode 6
2016–2017	Nightcap	Staci Cole	
2015–2022	Live with Kelly and Ryan	Self	Guest host
2019	Will & Grace	Dr. Saperstein	Episode: "The Chick & The Egg Donor", season 11 episode 4
2022	Would I Lie to You? (US)	Self	Episode: "Banana Bread"
2022	The Parent Test	Self	
2024	Unfrosted	Unidentified woman at Schwinn's funeral	
2026	Elsbeth	Lina Vyanti	season 3 episode 12 "All's Hair"
2026	Quarter	Ali	Post-production
