= Janet Elliott Wulsin =

American explorer (1894–1963)

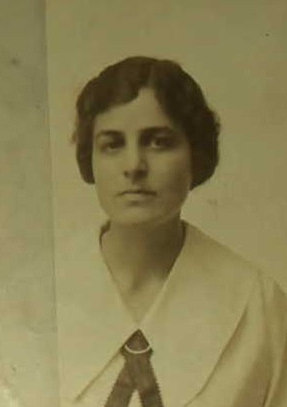
- Portrait, 1921
- Born: Janet January Elliott; October 17, 1893; St. Louis, Missouri, United States
- Died: November 15, 1963 (aged 70)
- Occupations: nurse; explorer
- Spouse(s): Frederick Wulsin (1919–1929); Richard Hobart (after 1929)
- Children: Muffie Cabot
- Parents: Howard Elliott (father); Janet January (mother)
- Relatives: Ali Wentworth (granddaughter)

Janet Elliott Wulsin (October 17, 1893 – November 15, 1963) was an American early 20th-century explorer, whose accomplishments place her in line with contemporary women explorers such as Alexandra David-Neel.

Janet January Elliott was reared in an affluent family in Boston and New York, the daughter of railroad executive, Howard Elliott. Anxious to explore, Janet was tired of the "superficial social life of her world in New York," and, in 1918, at age 24, she joined the Red Cross as a nurse in France to help out the war effort and to be near her fiancé, Frederick Roelker Wulsin, whom she married in 1919.

== Life and work ==
She was born Janet January Elliott to a wealthy New York family. Her father was a railroad executive.

Janet served as a Red Cross nurse in the French Third Republic during World War I. In 1919, she left New York for Paris, where she married Frederick Wulsin, a Harvard University graduate from a self-proclaimed prominent Ohio family.

Inspired by the travels of Roy Chapman Andrews, the Wulsins resolved to dedicate themselves to a life of folly and travel the world. From 1921 to 1925, the couple mounted expeditions to the far reaches of China, Tibet, and Outer Mongolia to study the people, flora, and fauna of the region. With a grant from the National Geographic Society, the Wulsin's undertook the National Geographic Society Central China Expedition. They took 28 camels, six horses, four Mongolian camel drivers and 10 Chinese "specimen collectors". Together, the Wulsins collected 1,400 botanical and zoological specimens and documented Buddhist rituals. They also took hundreds of photographs, documented tribespeople and desert landscapes, and were even allowed to photograph the interior of several of the great Tibetan Buddhist lamaseries, one of few early Westerners allowed to do so.

In 1926, National Geographic published one account of their expeditions, but Janet's contributions went uncredited. Stray newspaper articles in the United States were often misleading or inaccurate. The Wulsins returned to the United States in 1925, and divorced in 1929. Elliott remarried Richard Hobart, a banker and collector of Chinese art.

Janet's role in her first husband's expeditions went largely uncredited until after her death in 1963, when her daughter, Mabel Cabot, mother of Ali Wentworth, found her mother's private letters and diaries and published Vanished Kingdoms (ISBN 1-931788-08-1), a biographical account of Janet's explorations.
