= Muffie Cabot =

American heiress and socialite

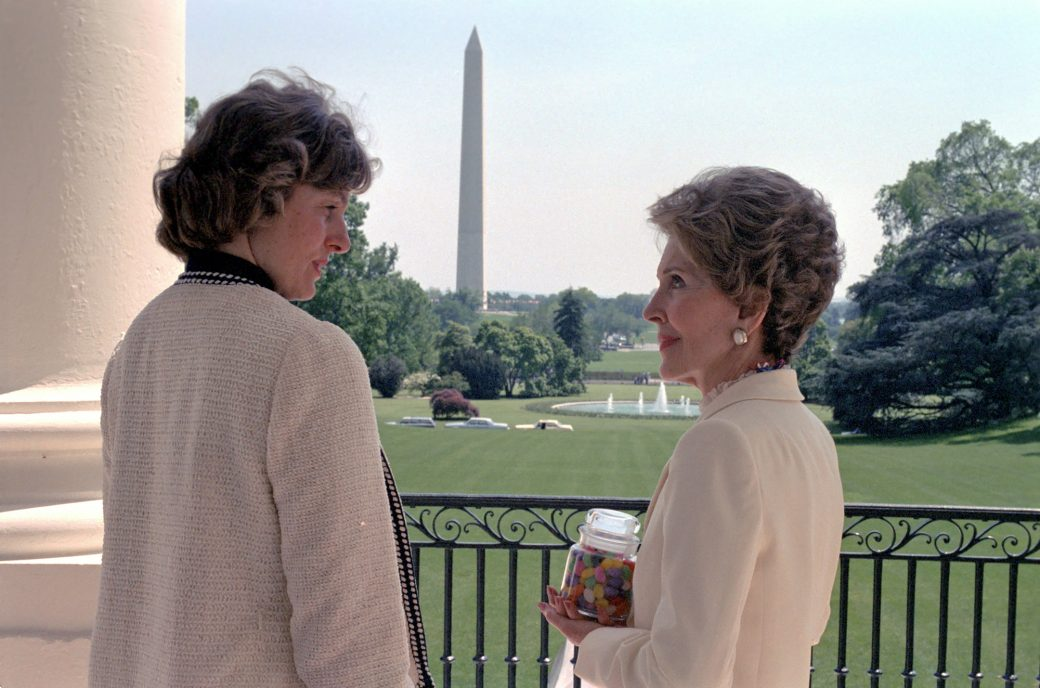
- with Nancy Reagan, 1981
- Born: Mabel Bryant Hobart c. 1936 (age 89–90)
- Education: Smith College
- Political party: Democratic Party
- Spouses: Eric Wentworth (div. 1964) Henry Brandon (m. 1970; died 1993) Louis Wellington Cabot (m. 1997)
- Children: 4, including Ali Wentworth
- Parents: Richard Hobart (father); Janet Elliott Wulsin (mother)

Mabel "Muffie" Wentworth Brandon Cabot (née Bryant Hobart; born c. 1936) is an American heiress and socialite. During the 1980s she served as social secretary to Nancy Reagan. She is the mother of actress Ali Wentworth.

== Early life ==
A member of an American family descended from passengers on the Mayflower, Cabot grew up in Cambridge, Massachusetts, was educated at various boarding schools, and graduated from Smith College. Her father, Richard Hobart, was an art collector and an investment banker with Loomis Sayles while her mother, Janet Elliott Wulsin, was a former explorer who undertook several National Geographic Society-financed expeditions to Tibet and Outer Mongolia.

== Career and marriages ==
=== Wentworth and Brandon eras ===
Cabot's first husband was Eric Wentworth, a correspondent for The Washington Post. The couple divorced in 1964. After divorce, Cabot remained in residence at the pair's Embassy Row home now known as Whitehaven. In 1970 she married British national Henry Brandon, a longtime Washington correspondent for The Sunday Times once known as "the most powerful foreign correspondent in the USA". During this period the couple were known for hosting parties that were the highlight of the Washington social scene.

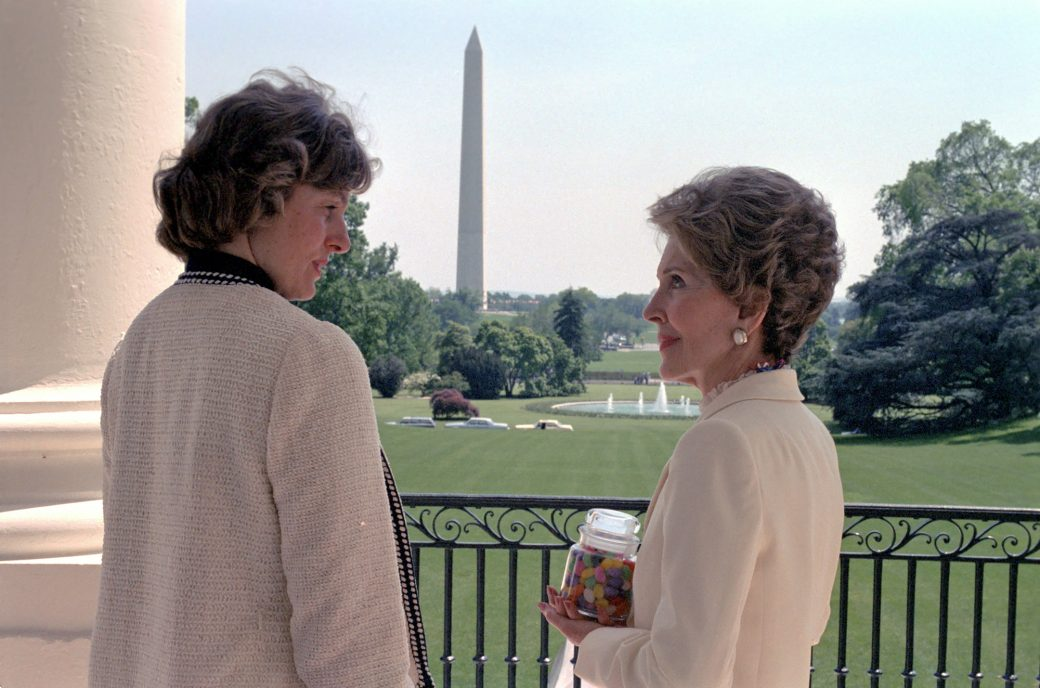
Muffie Brandon (left) speaks with First Lady Nancy Reagan on the White House state floor balcony on May 13, 1981.

Despite being a lifelong Democrat and personal friend of the Kennedy family, she was appointed social secretary to fellow Smith College alumna Nancy Reagan in 1981, serving the First Lady until 1985. She went on to sit on the boards of trustees of the Phillips Collection and the Eureka Foundation, and served as president of the Washington office of the public relations firm of Rogers & Cowan.

=== Cabot era ===
Cabot was widowed from her second husband, Brandon, in 1993. In 1997 she married Louis Wellington Cabot, chair of the America's Cup Foundation and of the Federal Reserve Bank of Boston, and a scion of the prominent Boston Cabot family.

In 2003, the Aperture Foundation published Muffie Cabot's Vanished Kingdoms: A Woman Explorer in Tibet, China, and Mongolia, 1921-1925, an account of her mother's travels in early 20th-century Asia. Her early work on the book was encouraged by long-time friend Jacqueline Kennedy Onassis who read a first draft prior to her death.

== Personal life ==
Describing her mother's preferences, Ali Wentworth has explained that Cabot "will choose a bath over a shower, a play over a movie, and the ocean over a pool." She has said that Cabot's normal response to any stress in life is to check into the Four Seasons Hotel; a few minutes after the September 11 attacks Cabot called Ali Wentworth, then living in New York, and recommended she immediately book a suite at the hotel.

In addition to Ali Wentworth, Cabot's other children from her marriage to Eric Wentworth included a son and another daughter. With Henry Brandon she also had a daughter.
