= Whitehaven (house) =

Mansion in Washington, US

- Location within Washington, D.C.

General information
- Architectural style: Georgian
- Location: 3067 Whitehaven Street NW, Washington, D.C., United States
- Coordinates: 38.9187°N 77.0635°W
- Owner: Bill Clinton

Technical details
- Material: brick
- Size: 5,500 square foot (510 m^{2})
- Floor count: 3
- Grounds: 0.33 acres (0.13 ha)

Whitehaven is a Clinton family-owned mansion in Washington, D.C. used by Hillary Clinton when she is in residence in the capital. (The primary Clinton home is in Chappaqua, New York.) Built in 1951, the Georgian-style house is located near Washington's Embassy Row. Past residents have included Sir David Muirhead, Henry Brandon, and Muffie Cabot.

== Layout and location ==
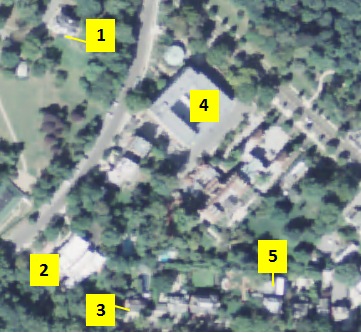
A satellite view of Whitehaven and surrounding neighborhood showing, (1) the Vice-President's Residence (One Observatory Circle); (2) the chancery of the New Zealand embassy; (3) Whitehaven estate; (4) the chancery of the British embassy; (5) the chancery of the Sri Lankan embassy.

Whitehaven, named for its location on Whitehaven Street, is a brick Georgian-style mansion with white trim that sits on 0.33 acres (0.13 ha) of property in the Massachusetts Avenue Heights neighborhood and is adjacent to the embassies of New Zealand, Sri Lanka, and the United Kingdom, and within walking distance of Number One Observatory Circle, the official residence of the Vice-President of the United States.

According to The Washington Post, Whitehaven is situated in an area that is "the kind of place where 'No Trespassing' signs outnumber welcome mats and where maids answer the doorbells in the afternoon," while The New York Times, quoting a local real estate broker, described it as a "quiet neighborhood" with "no real sense of community per se".

As of 2000, the year of its purchase by the Clintons, the 5,500-square-foot (510 m^{2}) home had seven bedrooms and five bathrooms. From 2004 to 2007, the property was redecorated and expanded by Washington-area designer Rosemarie Howe. The main dining room can accommodate 30 dinner guests and the expansive backyard features a swimming pool.

== History ==
=== Early residents ===
Whitehaven was constructed in 1951. Early residents included Sir David Muirhead, as well as Henry Brandon (longtime Washington correspondent for The Sunday Times) and Brandon's wife Muffie, who would eventually become mother-in-law to Bill Clinton's communications director George Stephanopoulos.

From 1980 to 2000, the property was owned and occupied by Joseph W. Henderson, a Republican and general partner of an investment group. After the children of Henderson and his wife left home to attend Harvard University, the couple decided to sell the property and take up primary residence at their other estates in Berryville, Virginia, and Fisher's Island, New York, instead.

=== Clinton residency ===
Whitehaven was sold to the Clintons by Henderson in 2000 for $2.85 million, below the $3.5 million list price, and had an assessed value in 2016 of $5.3 million. The purchase of the house by Bill and Hillary Clinton marked the first time a former United States president had owned a property in Washington since Woodrow Wilson.

In 2006, Hillary Clinton's mother, Dorothy Howell Rodham, moved into Whitehaven.

Friends and colleagues of the Clintons have said Whitehaven has typically been reserved for the exclusive use of Hillary Clinton, and invitations to visit the property are considered a high privilege reserved for close confidantes. Clinton used the house as a "fortress of solitude" while working on her book Hard Choices and has hosted important gatherings at the property with advisors. She reportedly made the decision to enter the 2016 presidential race, in part, at Whitehaven.

== See also ==
- Presidential Townhouse (a U.S. government-owned house available for use by Bill Clinton and other former presidents)
- Trowbridge House (a U.S. government-owned house available for use by Bill Clinton and other former presidents)
