= Robert E. Pursley =

American Air Force general (1927–2025)

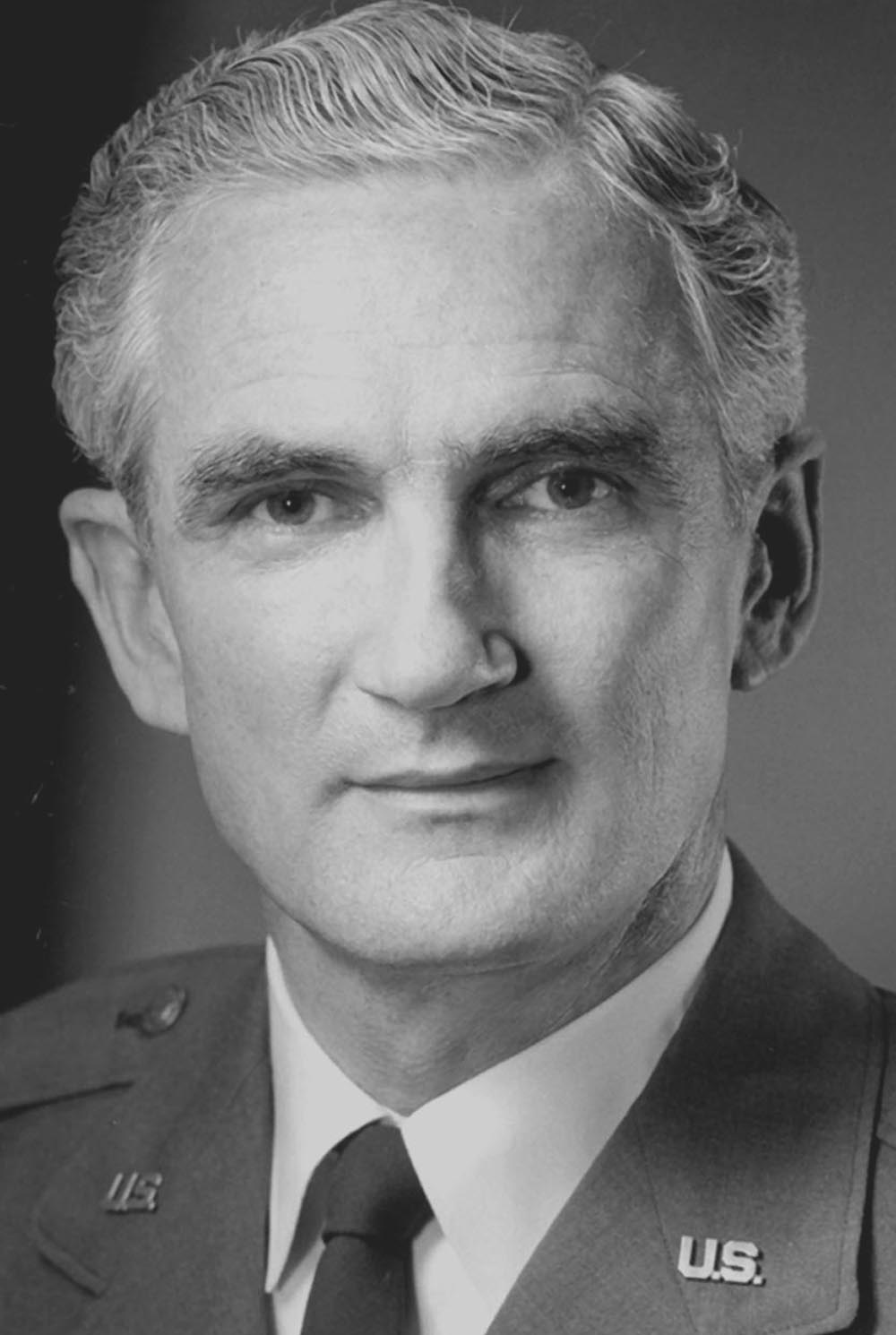
- Born: November 23, 1927; Muncie, Indiana, U.S.
- Died: July 24, 2025 (aged 97); Stamford, Connecticut, U.S.
- Military career
- Allegiance: United States
- Branch: United States Air Force
- Service years: 1949–1974
- Rank: Lieutenant General
- Commands: United States Forces Japan; Fifth Air Force
- Conflicts: Korean War
- Awards: Defense Distinguished Service Medal; Air Force Distinguished Service Medal (2); Legion of Merit; Distinguished Flying Cross

Robert Edwin Pursley (November 23, 1927 – July 24, 2025) was a lieutenant general in the United States Air Force who served as commander of United States Forces Japan and Fifth Air Force, with headquarters at Fuchu Air Station, Japan. As commander, he was the senior United States military representative in Japan and responsible for the conduct of United States air operations in Japan and the Republic of Korea.

== Early life and education ==
Pursley was born in Muncie, Indiana on November 23, 1927. He attended Ball State University and graduated from the United States Military Academy in 1949 with a Bachelor of Science and a commission in the United States Air Force as second lieutenant. He received a Master of Business Administration from Harvard University in 1957, and took additional post-graduate work at Harvard until June 1958.

== Military career ==
In June 1949 Pursley was assigned as a student to the Air Tactical School, Tyndall Air Force Base. He began pilot training in February 1950, first at Randolph Air Force Base, Texas, and completed advanced pilot training in February 1951, at Vance Air Force Base, Oklahoma. Transferred to Biggs Air Force Base, Texas, in March 1951, he became a mission pilot with the 1st Tow Target Squadron.

Pursley attended combat crew training from May through July 1952 and was subsequently assigned to the 8th Bombardment Squadron, 3d Bombardment Group in Korea. There he flew 50 combat missions in night-intruder B-26 aircraft. He returned to the United States in February 1953 and was assigned to the 3565th Observer Training Wing, James Connally Air Force Base, Texas. There, Pursley served as wing operations and training officer.

From August 1955 to June 1958, Pursley was a graduate student at Harvard School of Business, under the Air Force Institute of Technology program. He then was transferred to the United States Air Force Academy, Colorado Springs. He was in turn instructor, assistant professor and associate professor in the Department of Economics.

In May 1963 Pursley was transferred to the office of the Secretary of Defense, Washington, D.C., where he served to July 1965 as Staff Analyst in the Systems Analysis office. He was a student and part-time faculty member At the Air War College, Maxwell Air Force Base, Alabama, from August 1965 to March 1966. He graduated with the Air War College class of 1966, winning the Major General Orval Anderson award for excellence in military/political strategy.

In April 1966 Pursley became military assistant to the secretary of defense, serving successively with secretaries Robert S. McNamara, Clark Clifford, and Melvin Laird. In August 1972, Pursley was assigned as vice commander, Fifth Air Force, with headquarters at Fuchu Air Station, Japan. He was appointed commander, United States Forces Japan and commander, Fifth Air Force, in November 1972.

Pursley was a command pilot. His military decorations and awards include the Defense Distinguished Service Medal, Air Force Distinguished Service Medal with oak leaf cluster, Legion of Merit, Distinguished Flying Cross, and the Air Medal with two oak leaf clusters.

== Retirement and death ==
Pursley retired on March 1, 1974. In retirement, he was president of the Logistics Management Institute and involved in the leadership of the United Services Automobile Association, J.H. Whitney & Co., and Insilco Corporation.

Pursley died in Stamford, Connecticut on July 24, 2025, at the age of 97.
