= Sts. Constantine and Helen Greek Orthodox Cathedral =

Greek Orthodox church in New York City, USA

Coordinates: 40.6906°N 73.9912°W

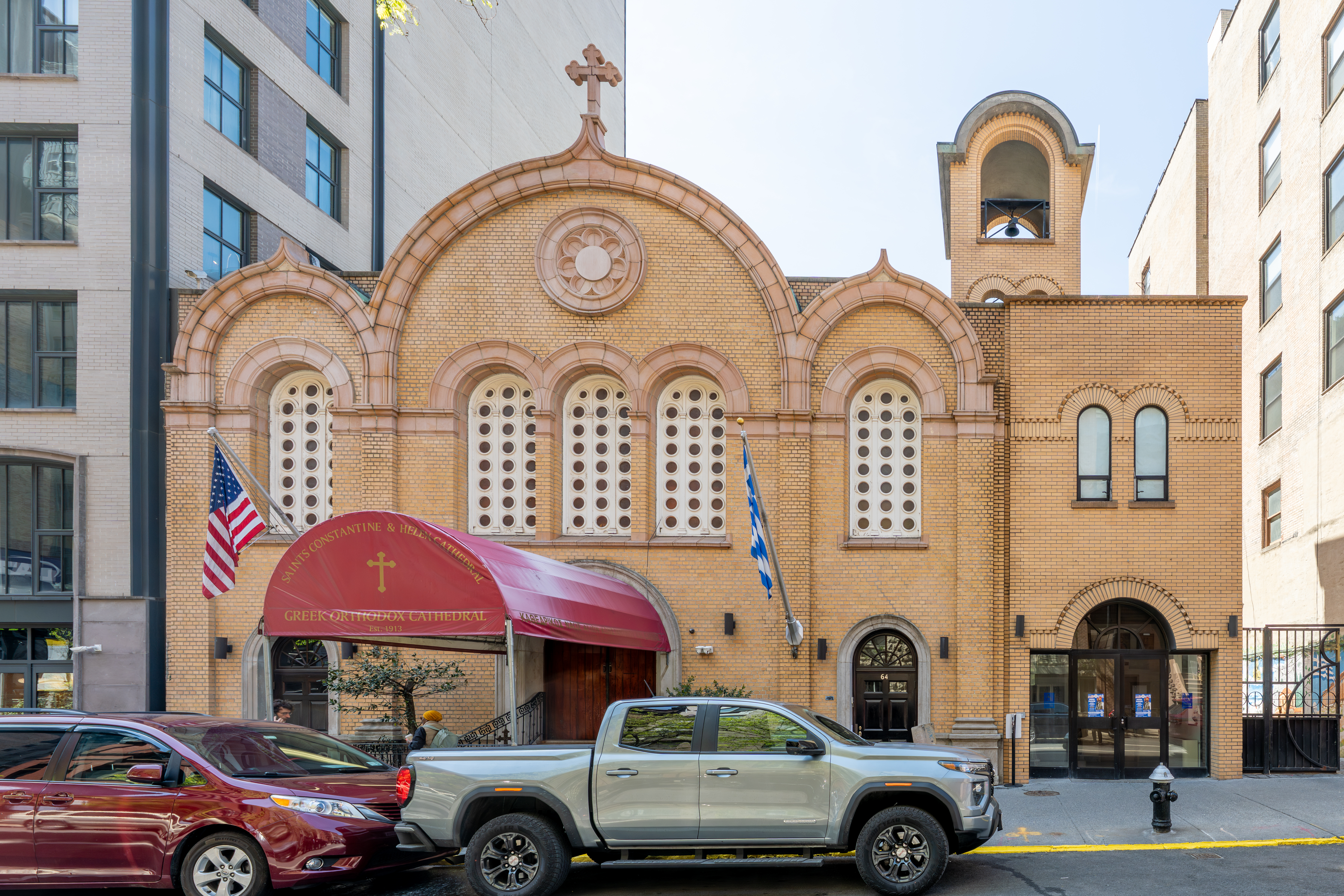

The Greek Orthodox Cathedral of Sts. Constantine and Helen, more simply Sts. Constantine and Helen Cathedral (though known by Greek Orthodox parishioners from other churches as NAK) is a Greek Orthodox cathedral church at 64 Schermerhorn Street in Downtown Brooklyn, New York. It is best known for taking in parishioners from St. Nicholas Greek Orthodox Church in Manhattan, destroyed during the September 11 attacks.

Founded in 1913, it was the first Greek Orthodox parish on Long Island, and is one of the oldest Greek Orthodox churches in the City of New York. After meeting for several years in a small building at Johnson and Lawrence streets, the community raised funds to build a new structure, whose cornerstone was laid April 16, 1916.

Fire damaged the building in 1991, but repairs have been made and the building restored. The Church also is affiliated with A. Fantis Parochial School, which was established in 1963, 50 years after the church, and which is located right behind the church. The Church is half a block west of the New York Transit Museum.

The church was expanded in 1946 and again in 1960. It was designated Brooklyn's cathedral in June 1966.

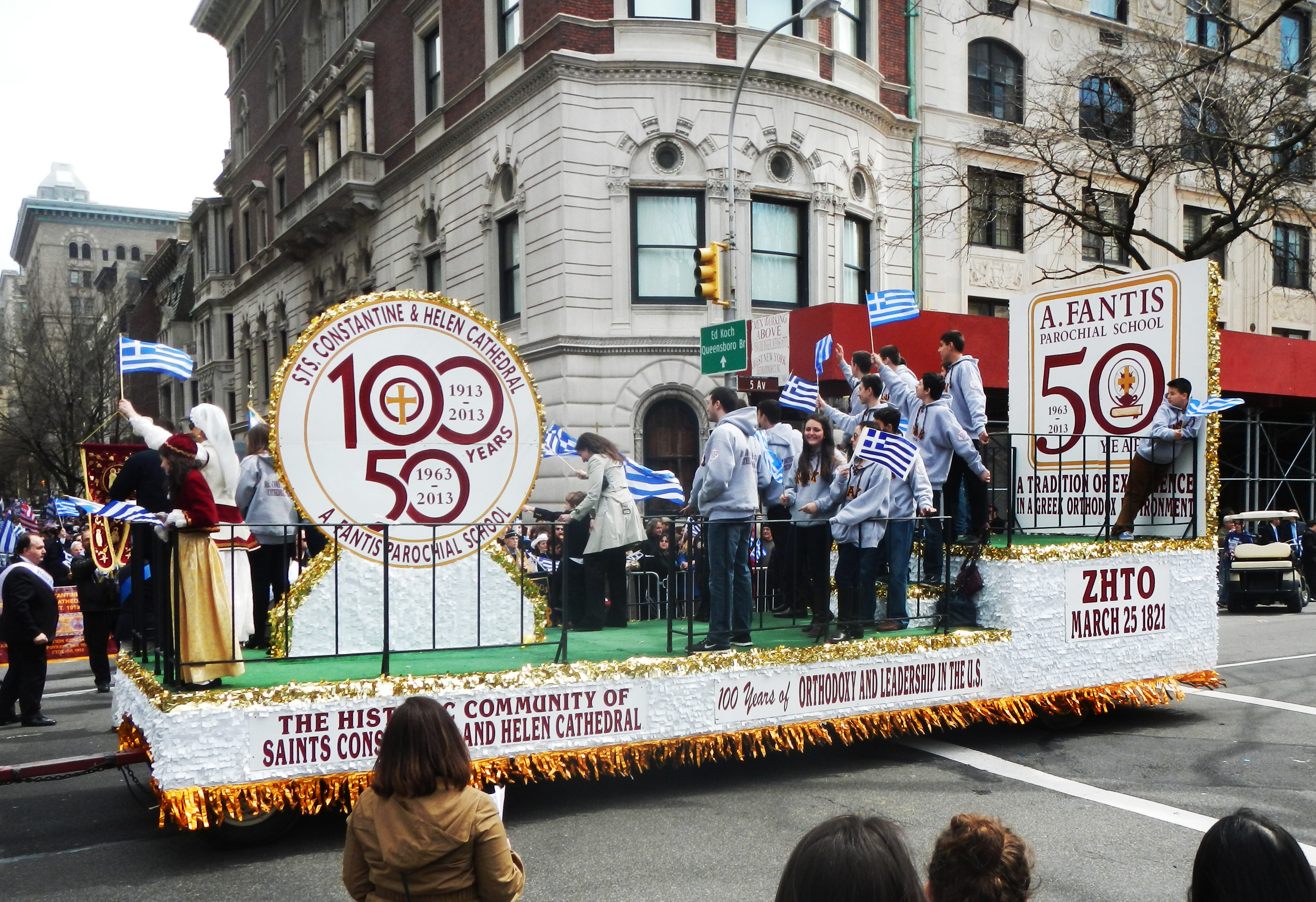
Fantis parochial school on parade in Manhattan
