= George Stephanopoulos =

American government official, journalist, and writer (born 1961)

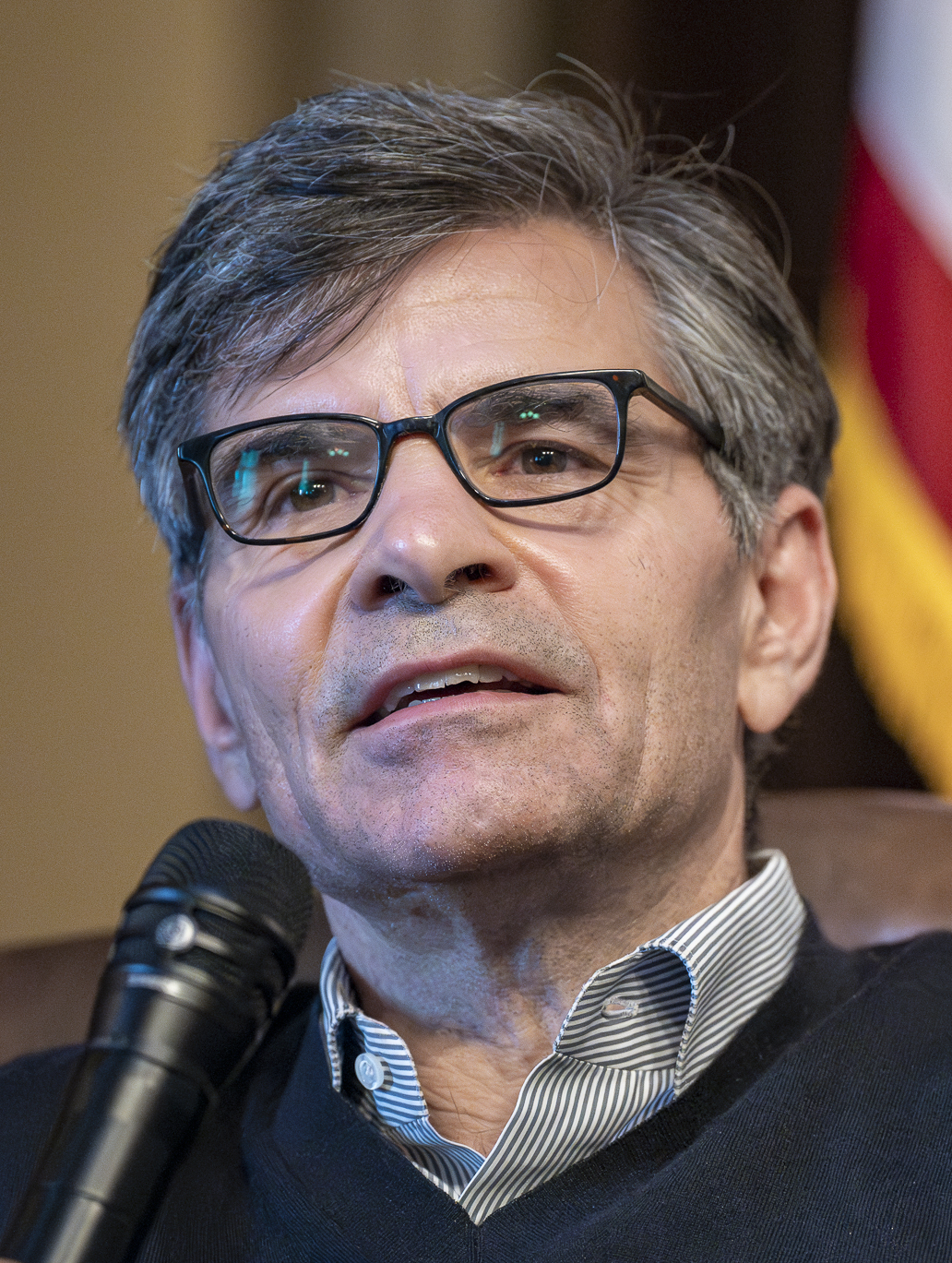
- Stephanopoulos in 2024

Senior Advisor to the President
- In office June 7, 1993 – December 10, 1996
- President: Bill Clinton
- Preceded by: Rahm Emanuel
- Succeeded by: Sidney Blumenthal

White House Communications Director
- In office January 20, 1993 – June 7, 1993
- President: Bill Clinton
- Preceded by: Margaret D. Tutwiler
- Succeeded by: Mark Gearan

Personal details
- Born: George Robert Stephanopoulos; February 10, 1961 (age 65) Fall River, Massachusetts, U.S.
- Party: Democratic
- Spouse: Ali Wentworth (m. 2001)
- Children: 2
- Education: Columbia University (BA); Balliol College, Oxford (MA)

George Robert Stephanopoulos (born February 10, 1961) is an American television host, political commentator, and former Democratic advisor. Stephanopoulos currently is a coanchor with Robin Roberts and Michael Strahan on Good Morning America, and host of This Week, ABC's Sunday morning current events news program.

Before his career as a journalist, Stephanopoulos was an advisor to the Democratic Party. He rose to early prominence as a communications director for the 1992 presidential campaign of Bill Clinton and subsequently became White House communications director. He was later senior advisor for policy and strategy, before departing in December 1996.

== Early life and education ==
George Stephanopoulos was born in Fall River, Massachusetts, the son of Robert George Stephanopoulos and Nickolitsa "Nikki" Gloria (née Chafos). His parents were of Greek descent. His father was a Greek Orthodox priest and dean emeritus of the Archdiocesan Cathedral of the Holy Trinity in New York City. His mother was the director of the Greek Orthodox Archdiocese of America National News Service for many years. His sister is Mother Agapia Stephanopoulos.

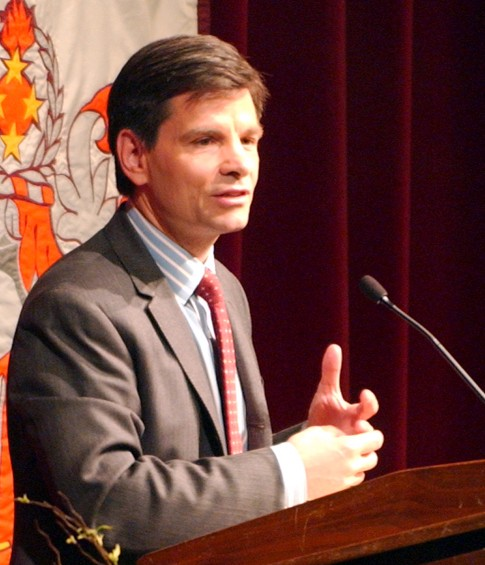
Stephanopoulos speaking at Virginia Tech in March 2006

Following some time in Purchase, New York, Stephanopoulos moved to the eastern suburbs of Cleveland, Ohio, where he graduated in 1978 from Orange High School in Pepper Pike.

In 1982, Stephanopoulos received a Bachelor of Arts degree (summa cum laude) with a major in political science from Columbia University in New York, and was the salutatorian of his class. While at Columbia, he was elected to Phi Beta Kappa his junior year and was awarded a Harry S. Truman Scholarship. He was also a sports broadcaster for 89.9 WKCR-FM, the university's radio station. As a student, he lived in Carman Hall and East Campus.

Stephanopoulos attended Balliol College at the University of Oxford in England, as a Rhodes Scholar, earning a Master of Arts in Theology in 1984.

== Political career ==
=== Early work ===
Stephanopoulos worked in Washington, D.C. as an aide to Ed Feighan of Ohio, a Democratic congressman. His job included drafting letters, memos, and speeches. His salary was reportedly $14,500 a year. He later became Feighan's chief of staff.

In 1988, Stephanopoulos worked on the U.S. presidential campaign of Michael Dukakis. He noted that one of his attractions to the campaign was that Dukakis was a Greek-American liberal from Massachusetts. After the campaign, Stephanopoulos became an executive floor assistant to Dick Gephardt, U.S. House of Representatives Majority Leader; he held this position until he joined the Clinton campaign.

=== Clinton administration ===
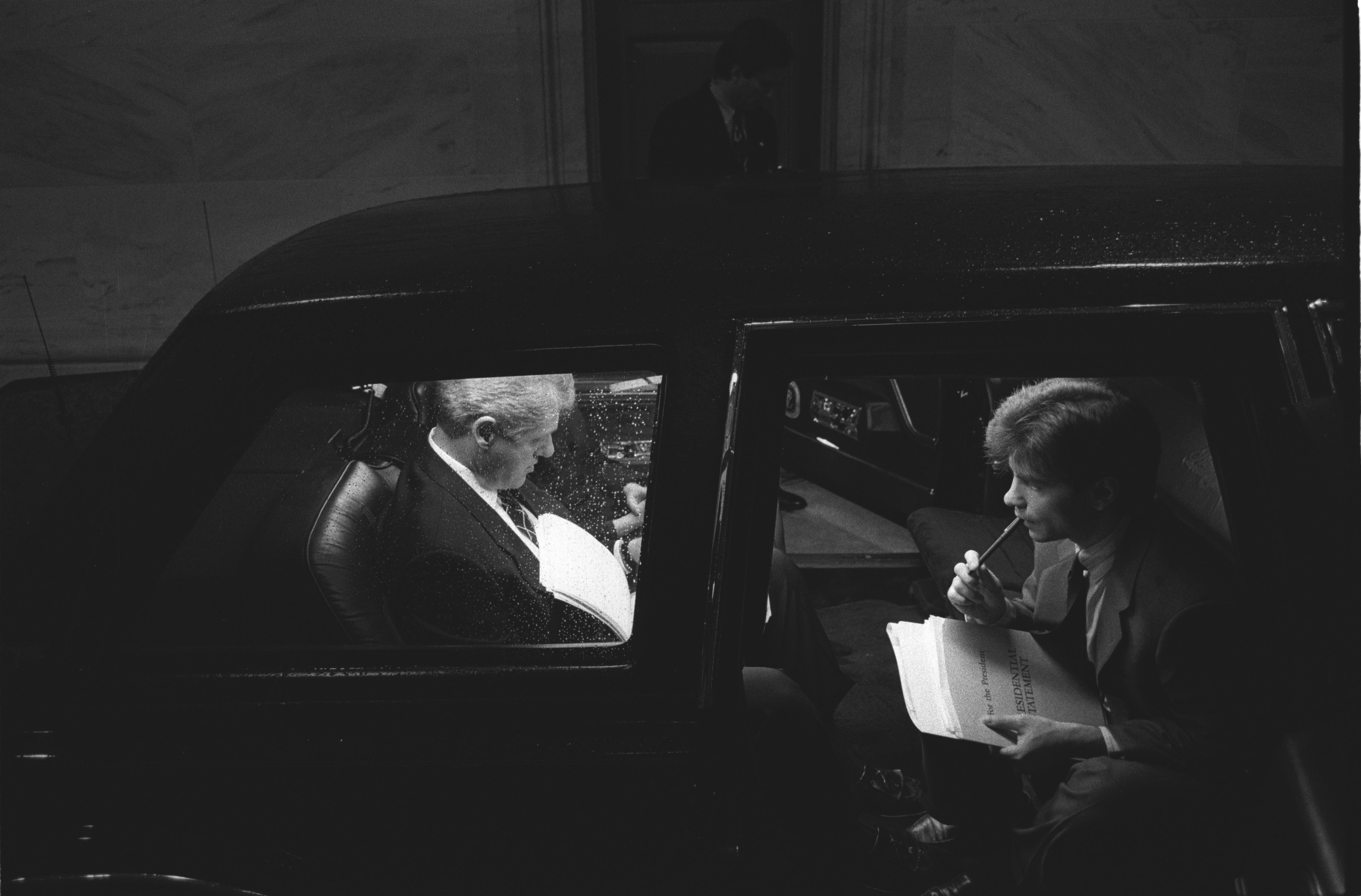
Stephanopoulos and President Bill Clinton prepare for the State of the Union Address in 1994.

Stephanopoulos was, with David Wilhelm and James Carville, a leading member of Clinton's 1992 U.S. presidential campaign. His role on the campaign is portrayed in the documentary film The War Room (1993).

In the Clinton administration, Stephanopoulos served as a senior advisor for policy and strategy. His initiatives focused on crime legislation, affirmative action, and health care. His salary was reportedly $125,000 per year. At the outset of Clinton's presidency, Stephanopoulos also served as the de facto press secretary, briefing the press even though Dee Dee Myers was officially the White House Press Secretary. Stephanopoulos was regarded as a member of Bill Clinton's inner circle.

In 1994, after Paula Jones accused Bill Clinton of sexual harassment, Stephanopoulos and James Carville sought to discredit her allegations against Clinton. Both men suggested that Jones was just seeking cash for her story. Stephanopoulos also successfully sought to keep Jones's news conference off television. Stephanopoulos called NBC journalist Tim Russert, CNN chairman Tom Johnson, as well as several others, whom he convinced to keep her conference off television.

On February 25, 1994, Stephanopoulos and Harold Ickes had a conference call with Roger Altman to discuss the Resolution Trust Corporation's choice of Republican lawyer Jay Stephens to head the Madison Guaranty investigation as well as discussing if Stephens could be removed. The Madison Guaranty investigation would later turn into the Whitewater controversy.

In 1995, as he pulled out of a parking space in front of a restaurant in the Georgetown neighborhood of Washington, D.C., his car collided with a parked vehicle. Stephanopoulos was arrested and charged with leaving the scene of an accident and driving with an expired license and license plates. White House press secretary, Mike McCurry, said that President Clinton told Stephanopoulos "not to worry about" the accident but to get his license renewed. The charge of leaving the scene of an accident was subsequently dropped.

In 1998, Stephanopoulos was deposed as part of Judicial Watch's lawsuit against the administration regarding alleged mishandling of FBI files and was asked to search for documents subpoenaed. However, judge Royce Lamberth later ruled that he "falsely testified" at his deposition and failed to search for the documents subpoenaed.

In 1999, Stephanopoulos and James Carville were sued for defamation by Gennifer Flowers. Stephanopoulos had made comments about her allegations that she had an affair with Bill Clinton. He accused Flowers of doctoring her taped conversation with Clinton to make her story look credible. Stephanopoulos also called her story "tabloid trash", "garbage", and "crap". The suit was dismissed since his comments were not the basis for defamation.

Stephanopoulos resigned from the Clinton administration shortly after Clinton was re-elected in 1996. Stephanopoulos is credited as among the first inside the White House to recognize the damage the Lewinsky affair could cause to the Clinton presidency.

His memoir, All Too Human: A Political Education (1999), was published after he left the White House during Clinton's second term. It quickly became a number-one bestseller on The New York Times Best Seller list for five weeks. In the book, Stephanopoulos spoke of his depression and how his face broke out into hives due to the pressures of conveying the Clinton White House message. Clinton, referencing the book in his autobiography, My Life, expressed regret for the excessive pressure he placed on the young staffer.

Stephanopoulos's book covers his time with Clinton from the day he met him in September 1991, to the day Stephanopoulos left the White House in December 1996, through two presidential campaigns and four years in the White House. Stephanopoulos describes Clinton in the book as a "complicated man responding to the pressures and pleasures of public life in ways I found both awesome and appalling".

== Journalism ==
After leaving the White House at the end of Clinton's first term, Stephanopoulos became a political analyst for ABC News, and served as a correspondent on This Week, ABC's Sunday morning public affairs program; World News Tonight, the evening news broadcast; Good Morning America, the morning news program; along with other various special broadcasts.

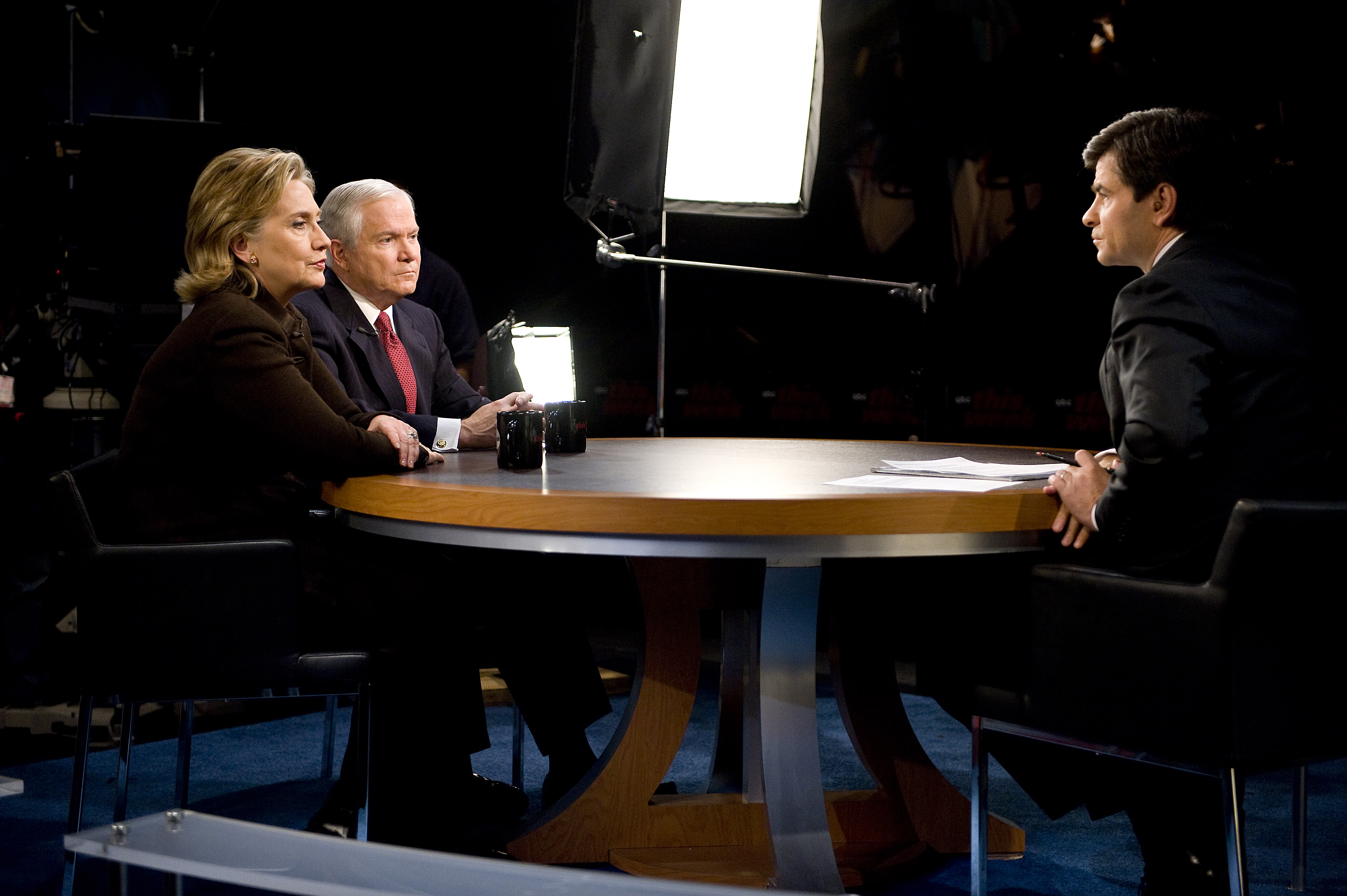
Secretary of Defense Robert M. Gates and Secretary of State Hillary Clinton talk with George Stephanopoulos in December 2009 in Washington, D.C.

In September 2002, Stephanopoulos became host of This Week, and ABC News officially named him "Chief Washington Correspondent" in December 2005. The program's title added the new host's name.

When named to the position, Stephanopoulos was a relative newcomer to the show, usurping longtime panelists and short-term co-hosts Sam Donaldson and Cokie Roberts who, for a few years, briefly replaced the longtime original host, David Brinkley.

ABC News executives reportedly offered Ted Koppel, former Nightline anchor, the This Week host job in 2005 after the program's ratings had become a regular third-, fourth-, and sometimes fifth-place finish after competitors NBC, CBS, Fox, and syndicated programs. However, This Week beat Meet the Press on January 11, 2009, when Stephanopoulos interviewed president-elect Barack Obama.

On April 16, 2008, Stephanopoulos co-moderated, with Charles Gibson, the twenty-first, and ultimately final, Democratic Party presidential debate between Illinois Senator Barack Obama and New York Senator Hillary Clinton for the 2008 election cycle. While the debate received record ratings, the co-moderators were heavily criticized for focusing most of the first hour of the debate on controversies that occurred during the campaign rather than issues such as the economy and the Iraq War. Stephanopoulos acknowledged the legitimacy of the concerns over the order of the questions, but said they were issues in the campaign that had not been covered in previous debates.

During the 2008 presidential election campaign, Stephanopoulos launched a blog George's Bottom Line on the ABC News website. Stephanopoulos blogged about political news and analysis from Washington.

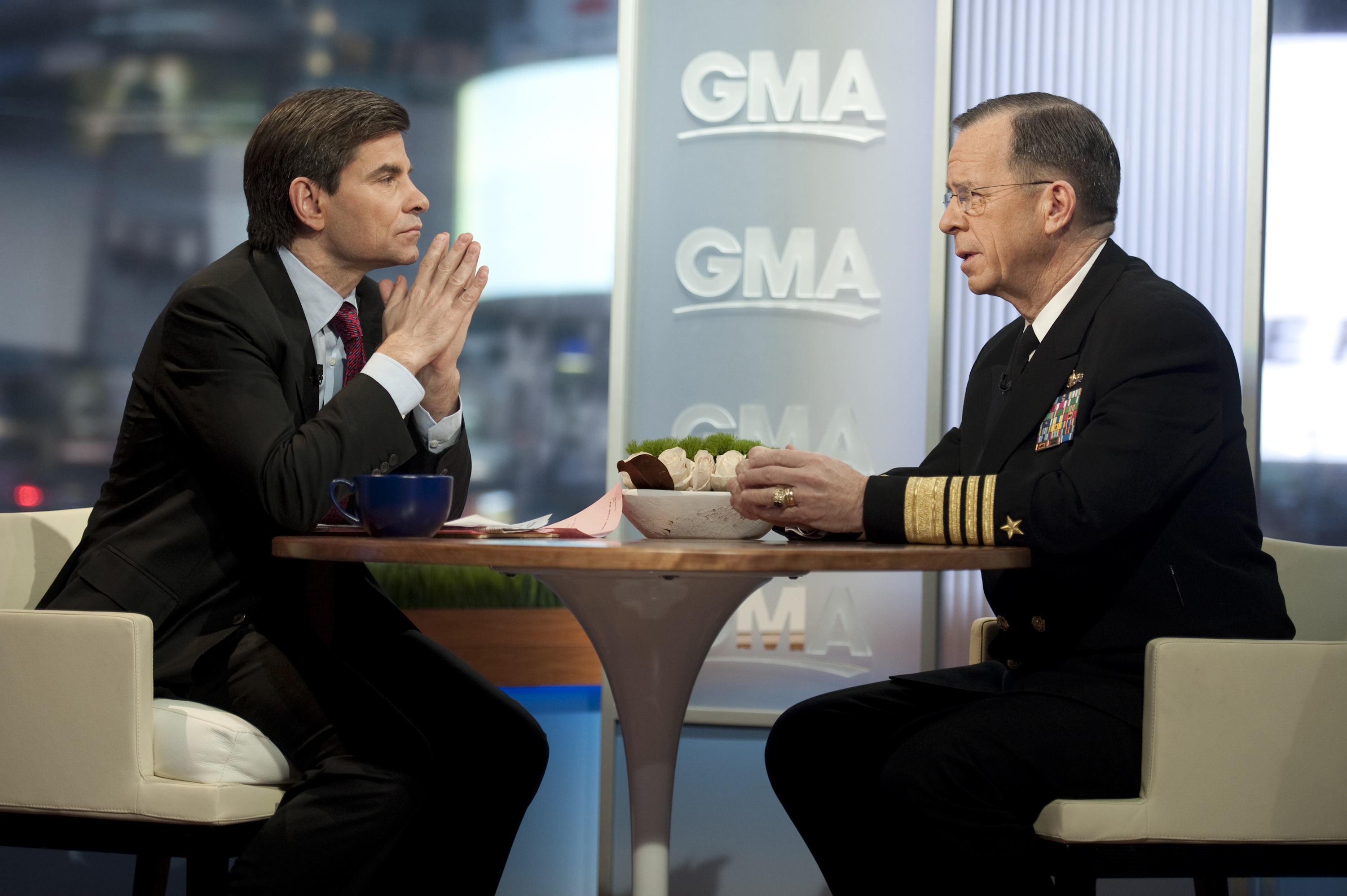
Chairman of the Joint Chiefs of Staff Adm. Mike Mullen is interviewed by Good Morning America's Stephanopoulos.

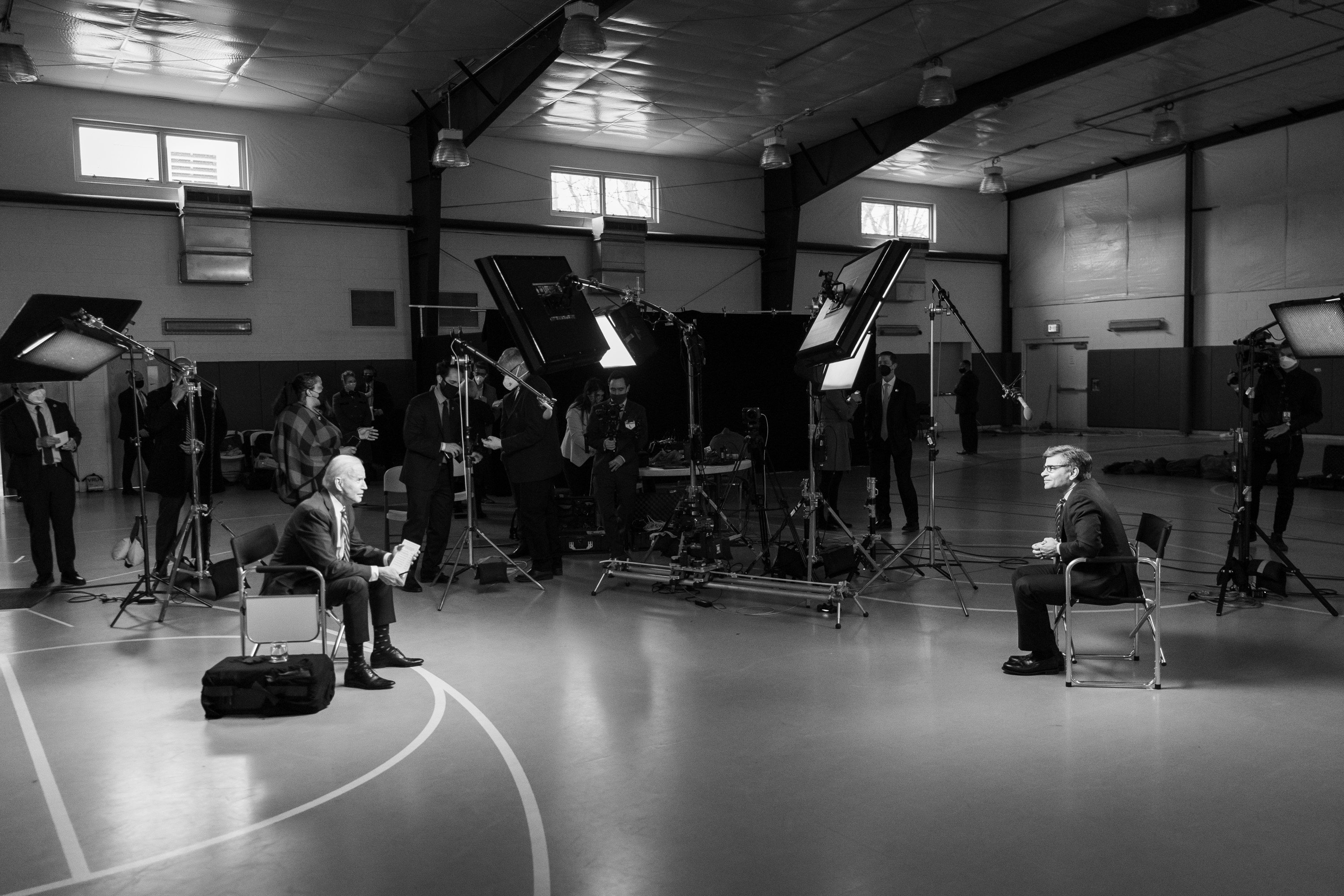
Stephanopoulos interviews President Joe Biden in 2021.

In December 2009, ABC News president David Westin offered Stephanopoulos Diane Sawyer's job on Good Morning America after Sawyer was named anchor of World News. Stephanopoulos accepted the new position and began co-anchoring GMA on December 14, 2009. Stephanopoulos announced on January 10, 2010, that that would be his last broadcast as the permanent host of This Week. However, after his successor, Christiane Amanpour, left the show amid sagging ratings, it was announced that Stephanopoulos would return as host of This Week in December 2011. He signed a deal to stay with ABC until 2021 worth $105 million.

On January 7, 2012, Stephanopoulos was the co-moderator of a debate among Mitt Romney, Ron Paul and Rick Santorum. During the debate, Stephanopoulos repeatedly asked Romney whether the former Massachusetts governor believes the U.S. Supreme Court should overturn a 1965 ruling that a constitutional right to privacy bars states from banning contraception. During the debate, Romney said it was a preposterous question.

Following Diane Sawyer's departure from World News at the end of August 2014, Stephanopoulos was the Chief Anchor at ABC News from 2014 to 2020 while retaining his roles on GMA and This Week. Stephanopoulos leads a new documentary unit for Disney's digital platforms and hosts four primetime hour-long specials on the ABC network annually.

=== Speaking engagements ===
In 2009, Stephanopoulos spoke at the annual Tri-C Presidential Scholarship Luncheon held at the Renaissance Cleveland Hotel and praised Cuyahoga Community College.

=== Other ventures ===
George Stephanopoulos is the co-founder of production companies BedBy8 and George Stephanopoulos Productions. These companies produced Pretty Baby: Brooke Shields, Grand Knighthawk: Infiltrating the KKK, Power Trip: Those Who Seek Power and Those Who Chase Them, and Out of the Shadows: The Man Behind the Steele Dossier.

== Controversies ==
=== Real estate loan controversy ===
In 1994, columnist Jack Anderson reported that Stephanopoulos signed an $835,000 commercial real estate deal consisting of a two-story apartment, including an eyewear retailer, with a below-market loan rate from a bank owned by Hugh McColl, who had been called by President Clinton "the most enlightened banker in America". A NationsBank commercial loan officer said that this loan did "not fit our product matrix" as banks typically offer such loans for only those customers who have deep pockets and on a short-term adjustable rate basis. Stephanopoulos's real estate agent explained that "nobody making $125,000 could qualify for the property without the commercial property (lease)." One former senior bank regulator told Anderson, "If his name were George Smith, and he didn't work in the White House, this loan wouldn't have gotten made."

Regarding the controversy, NationsBank stated, "The loan described by Jack Anderson as a commercial loan to George Stephanopoulos was, in fact, a residential mortgage loan. At the time the loan commitment was made, Mr. Anderson (or his imaginary 'George Smith' who 'doesn't work in the White House') could have walked into any NationsBank Mortgage Company office in the D.C. area and received the same excellent rate and term for the same deal."

However, Stephanopoulos's realtor states that he would not have qualified for the loan without the commercial property rent. One NationsBank source states that the issuance of a residential loan on mixed-use properties is such a rarity that it was not even addressed in the "NationsBank Mortgage Corporation's Program Summary" or its "Credit Policy Manual". A NationsBank underwriting memo revealed that one of the three restrictions for mixed-use properties is that "the borrower must be the owner of the business entity". The source claims that NationsBank told the listing agent that, "We're not (interested in mixed-use properties), but we do have an appetite for this particular loan." NationsBank's primary regulator at the time was Comptroller of the Currency Eugene Ludwig, a Rhodes scholar who attended Yale Law School with President Clinton, and who had been asked to investigate NationsBank by Democratic congressmen Henry B. Gonzalez and John Dingell.

=== Clinton Foundation charity donations ===
Stephanopoulos donated $25,000 in 2012, 2013, and 2014, a total of $75,000, to the Clinton Foundation, but did not disclose the donations to ABC News, his employer, or to his viewers. Stephanopoulos failed to reveal the donations even on April 26, 2015, while interviewing Peter Schweizer, the author of Clinton Cash, a book which alleges that donations to the Foundation influenced some of Hillary Clinton's actions as Secretary of State. After exposure of the donations by Politico on May 14, 2015, Stephanopoulos apologized and admitted he should have disclosed the donations to ABC News and its viewers. The story was broken by The Washington Free Beacon, which had questioned ABC News regarding the matter. The donations had been reported by the Clinton Foundation, which Stephanopoulos had considered sufficient, a reliance ABC News characterized as "an honest mistake".

Based on Stephanopoulos's donations to The Clinton Foundation charity and his behavior during prior interviews and presidential debates, Republican party leaders and candidates expressed their distrust, and called for him to be banned from moderating 2016 Presidential debates, due to bias and conflict of interest. He agreed to drop out as a moderator of the scheduled February 2016 Republican presidential primary debate.

In the month prior to the revelation of his donations, Stephanopoulos told Jon Stewart on The Daily Show that when money is given to the Clinton Foundation, "everybody" knows there's "a hope that that's going to lead to something, and that's what you have to be careful of."

=== Jeffrey Epstein association ===
In 2010, Stephanopoulos attended a dinner party at the home of convicted sex offender socialite Jeffrey Epstein alongside Chelsea Handler, Woody Allen, Katie Couric, Prince Andrew, Charlie Rose, and Eva Andersson-Dubin. Following Epstein's arrest in July 2019, the guest list of the party was reported online, with those attending receiving backlash, Stephanopoulos denied being friends with Epstein, with the party being the only encounter.

Stephanopoulos told The New York Times: "That dinner was the first and last time I've seen him, I should have done more due diligence. It was a mistake to go."

=== Donald Trump lawsuit ===
On March 19, 2024, Donald Trump filed a defamation lawsuit in Florida against ABC News and Stephanopoulos for an undisclosed sum over a March 10 airing of This Week, arguing that Stephanopoulos harmed Trump's reputation by claiming he was found liable for raping the writer E. Jean Carroll. The judge presiding over the case stated that the jury did find that Trump forcibly penetrated Carroll with his fingers. In July 2024, Judge Cecilia Altonaga, presiding over the suit brought by Trump, denied a motion to dismiss by Stephanopoulos, finding that the technical definition used by the judge in the New York case did not examine the findings made by the jury, which was "sexual abuse", not "rape". On December 14, 2024, George Stephanopoulos and ABC News settled the lawsuit, paying $15 million to Donald Trump's presidential library as a charitable contribution, $1 million for Trump's legal fees, and that ABC would issue a public statement that "ABC News and George Stephanopoulos regret statements regarding President Donald J. Trump made during [the] interview".

== In popular culture ==
In the fourth episode of the first season of the NBC television series Friends, entitled "The One with George Stephanopoulos" and originally aired 13 October 1994, the girls spy on Stephanopoulos across the street, after they were delivered his pizza by accident.

Stephanopoulos was the inspiration for the character of Henry Burton in Joe Klein's novel Primary Colors (1996). Burton was subsequently portrayed by Adrian Lester in the 1998 film adaptation. Michael J. Fox's character, Lewis Rothschild, in the film The American President (1995), written by Aaron Sorkin was modeled after Stephanopoulos. He was also used by Sorkin as the model for Rob Lowe's character, Sam Seaborn, on the television drama series The West Wing. According to Stephanopoulos, his role in the Clinton administration was more like Bradley Whitford's character Josh Lyman than Seaborn or Rothschild.

In 2000, he rivaled John F. Kennedy Jr. as the nineties' most eligible non-Hollywood bachelor, appearing (along with George Clooney) in a People magazine's "Most Wanted" list.

Stephanopoulos appeared in the Pawn Stars episode "Buy the Book", where he bought a first edition of Ernest Hemingway's For Whom the Bell Tolls for $675.

Stephanopoulos returned to his alma mater, Columbia University, in 2003, serving as the keynote speaker at Columbia College's Class Day. In 2013, Stephanopoulos played himself in House of Cards and in 2014 he played himself "Shadows", an episode of Agents of S.H.I.E.L.D. In September 2016, Stephanopoulos was featured on a €1 (1 euro) Greek postage stamp, along with other notable Greek-Americans.

In 2021, Stephanopoulos was portrayed by George H. Xanthis in two episodes of Impeachment: American Crime Story; the third season of the true-crime anthology television series American Crime Story on FX.

In July 2022, Loot's episode 4 of season 1 was released, in which main character Molly Novak said, "sometimes I turn on the news and pretend George Stephanopoulos is my husband."

== Personal life ==
Stephanopoulos is a Greek Orthodox Christian and has earned a master's degree in theology.

In 2001, Stephanopoulos married actress, comedian, and writer, Ali Wentworth, at the Archdiocesan Cathedral of the Holy Trinity on New York's Upper East Side. They have two daughters, one born in 2002 and one born in 2005. Stephanopoulos was introduced to transcendental meditation by Jerry Seinfeld. Conducting an interview on Good Morning America, he said, "We're all here because we all have something in common—we all practice Transcendental Meditation. … I think that people don't really understand exactly what it is and what a difference it has made in people's lives."

== Honors ==
In May 2007, Stephanopoulos received an Honorary Doctor of Laws from St. John's University in New York City.

He has won two, and been nominated for 17, News and Documentary Emmy Awards.

In November 2026, Stephanopoulos received a star on the Hollywood Walk of Fame.

== Bibliography ==
- All Too Human: A Political Education (1999)
- The Situation Room: The Inside Story of Presidents in Crisis (Grand Central Publishing, 2024)

== See also ==
- List of people associated with Balliol College, Oxford
- List of Columbia University alumni
- List of Eastern Orthodox Christians
- List of Greek Americans
- List of people from Cleveland
- List of people from Massachusetts
- List of people from New York City
- List of people from Washington, D.C.
- List of Rhodes Scholars
- List of television reporters
- List of talk show hosts
- Lists of American writers
- New Yorkers in journalism
