= Korean War order of battle: United States Air Force =

Overview of the United States Air Force units and aircraft of the Korean War

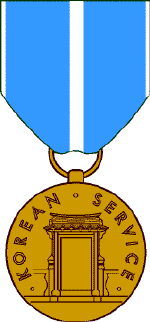
Obverse image of the medal with a Korean gateway encircled by the inscription "Korean Service"

The Korean War (25 June 1950 – 27 July 1953) was significant in the fact that it was the first war in which the newly independent United States Air Force was involved.

It was the first time U.S. jet aircraft entered into battle. Designed as a direct response to the Soviet MiG-15, the F-86 Sabre jets effectively countered these aircraft, tactics, and, on some occasions, pilots of the Soviet 64th Fighter Aviation Corps. World War II-era prop-driven P-51D Mustangs were pressed into the ground-air support role, and large formations of B-29 Superfortress bombers flew for the last time on strategic bombardment missions. The Korean War also saw the first large-scale use of rotary-wing helicopters.

The US suffered 4,055 service personnel killed and 2,714 aircraft lost with the USAF suffering 1,841 battle casualties, of which 1,180 were killed in action.

== Overview ==
Shaped in World War II by an increasing concentration on the strategic role of attacking an enemy's homeland, the Air Force now faced a conflict almost entirely tactical in character and limited as to how and where airpower could be applied.

The Far East Air Forces Fifth Air Force was the command and control organization for USAF forces engaged in combat. Its units were located in Korea and Japan. Fighter and troop carrier wings from Tactical Air Command and federalized Air National Guard units from the United States deployed to the Far East and reinforced FEAF units engaged in combat. These tactical units conducted interdiction strikes on supply lines, attacked dams that irrigated North Korea's rice crops and flew missions in close support of United Nations ground forces. AT-6 Mosquitoes, trainers used as airborne controllers, provided communication links between ground troops and supporting aircraft.

Although President Truman wasn't willing to risk extensive use of the U.S. bomber force, which was being used as a deterrent for possible Soviet aggression in Europe, a few groups of Strategic Air Command aging B-29 Superfortress bombers that were not part of the nuclear strike force were released for combat over the skies of Korea. Many of these B-29s were war-weary and brought out of five years of storage. These bombers were employed effectively against North Korean military installations, government centers and transportation networks.

As with the rest of the American armed forces, the Air Force was not well prepared for battle at the western rim of the Pacific. Yet despite these limitations, the Air Force responded quickly and effectively, proving in many ways the utility of airpower in modern war. With virtually no warning, the Air Force commenced operations within the first week. It transported troops and equipment from Japan to Korea, evacuated American nationals, provided significant intelligence through aerial reconnaissance, and most importantly helped to slow the North Korean advance so that the United Nations forces could construct a defensive position on the peninsula.

== Effects ==
The Korean War signalled the end of widespread use of prop-driven combat aircraft by the active-duty USAF and signalled the primacy of jet-powered aircraft. All F-82 Twin Mustangs had been removed from the theater by 1952 and F-51D Mustang strength had been cut in Korea from 190 to 65. First generation straight-winged F-80C Shooting Star and F-84E/G Thunderjet jet aircraft were shown inadequate against the Soviet MiG-15s. However, the swept-wing F-86 Sabre proved more effective, bringing a new generation of swept-wing aircraft into the USAF arsenal in the 1950s.

However prop-driven aircraft continued in the specialized role of counterinsurgency aircraft (A-1 Skyraider, A-26A Invader) by the 56th Special Operations Wing which were flown over Laos during the Vietnam War. (The F-51D/H Mustang was used by some ANG units in the Air Defense role, but by 1957 it was out of the inventory).

With the end of fighting in Korea, President Eisenhower, who had taken office in January 1953, called for a "new look" at national defense. The result: a greater reliance on nuclear weapons and air power to deter war. His administration invested in the Air Force, especially Strategic Air Command. The nuclear arms race became of signal importance. The Air Force retired nearly all of its propeller-driven B-29/B-50s and they were replaced by new Boeing B-47 Stratojet aircraft. By 1955 the Boeing B-52 Stratofortress would be entering the inventory in substantial numbers, as the prop-driven B-36s were quickly phased out of heavy bombardment units.

== Organization ==
During World War II, The Group, each with three or four flying squadrons, was the basic combat element of the Army Air Forces. This organization changed in 1947 when the new United States Air Forces adopted the wing-base plan. Each combat group then active received a controlling parent wing of the same number and nomenclature. The new wing also controlled three additional groups with the same number to operate the airbase, maintain the aircraft and provide medical care at the base. When combat forces began to fight the war in Korea, the USAF units did so in various organizational forms. In some cases, the combat arm of the wing plus a portion of the wing's supporting personnel deployed to the Korean theater, leaving the rest of the wing to operate the home base, to which the group returned after its tour of combat ended.

Early in the war, some combat group deployed and operated under other wings, including temporary four-digit wings. In December 1950, those groups' aligned (same number) parent wing moved on paper from their previous bases and replaced the temporary wing in combat. The personnel of the temporary wing's headquarters were reassigned to the headquarters of its replacement.

In 1951, the Strategic Air Command began to eliminate its combat group by reducing the group headquarters token strength and attaching the flying squadrons directly to the wing; therefore, wings replaced the medium bombardment groups attached to Far East Air Forces (FEAF) Bomber Command for combat. The groups were either inactivated or reduced in strength to one officer and one enlisted.

In most case, the personnel assigned to the group headquarters were simply reassigned to the wing headquarters which had moved on paper to the location of the headquarters. Most other combat organization in-theater continued to operate with both wing and group headquarters or with group headquarters only. In a few cases, individual squadron, such as the 319th Fighter-Interceptor Squadron, were directly controlled by an organization higher than either wing or group level.

== Aircraft of the Korean War ==
=== Fighters ===
==== Types employed ====
- North American F-51D Mustang
  F-51Ds, though obsolete as fighters, were better suited to the small airstrips of Korea than were the F-80s and F-82s based in Japan. Japan-based F-51Ds were immediately transferred to Korea and pressed into service in an attempt to halt the rapid North Korean advance. They carried out the majority of air support missions in the early days of the war, extant jet aircraft lacking the endurance to permit sufficient loiter time over the target. Although their primary mission was close support, USAF Mustangs did engage and shoot down several North Korean Yaks when these aircraft made their infrequent appearances. In instances where Mustangs were engaged by Chinese-piloted MiG-15 jet fighters, however, they were outmatched. Mustangs were however still able to perform well in the ground-attack role and substantial number were fitted with rockets and bombs. The Mustangs were instrumental in halting the North Korean advance, buying valuable time for United Nations forces to deploy. RF-51s were used for reconnaissance.
- Lockheed F-80C Shooting Star
  The Shooting Star was operated extensively in Korea with the F-80C being instrumental in quickly gaining and maintaining air superiority over the Korean battlefield. The first jet versus jet aircraft battle took place on 8 November 1950 in which an F-80 shot down a MiG-15. However, the straight-wing F-80s were inferior in performance to the MiGs and were soon replaced in the air superiority role by the swept-wing F-86 Sabre. When sufficient Sabres were in operation, the Shooting Star was assigned to ground attack missions, primarily for low-level rocket, bomb, and napalm attacks on fixed targets. The Shooting Stars were superseded by later types as the Korean War proceeded. By the time of the armistice agreement of 27 July 1953, the only Shooting Stars still flying combat missions in Korea were RF-80As being used for reconnaissance.
- Lockheed F-94B Starfire
  Because it carried a highly secret airborne radar system, the F-94s were at first not permitted to fly deep into enemy territory. However the F-94 radar proved ineffective on night missions against MiGs. Mounting losses of B-29 bombers following the Chinese and North Korean development of night interception tactics finally led to the lifting of this restriction in January 1953.
- North American F-82F/G Twin Mustang
  Based in Japan, the F-82s were among the first USAF aircraft to operate over Korea. They were the only fighter aircraft available with the range to cover the entire Korean peninsula from bases in Japan. The first three North Korean airplanes destroyed by US forces were shot down by F-82s on 27 June 1950. However, the F-82 played a secondary role in Korea as compared with its distinguished predecessor, the single-engined P-51. The Twin Mustang saw extensive service in Korea initially for air to air and ground-attack work, but their suitability as night fighters caused them to be used mostly for defense purposes. 1951 was the last full year of F-82 operations in Korea, as a shortage of spare parts limited their operations along with them being replaced by the jet-powered F-94 Starfire. Twin Mustangs destroyed 20 enemy aircraft, four in the air and 16 on the ground during the conflict. By summer 1952, the last surviving Korean War veteran F-82s were withdrawn from combat.
- Republic F-84D/E Thunderjet
  The F-84 arrived in Korea in December 1950. Initially assigned to B-29 escort duties, however, the F-84E proved too slow to match the swept-wing MiG-15, and MiGs were often able to outmanoeuvre the escort screen and make successful attacks on B-29s. F-84s were used to attack enemy airfields and other targets such as irrigation dams. The F-84 made daily attacks with bombs, rockets, and napalm on enemy railroads, bridges, supply depots, and troop concentrations. In two Thunderjet operations, attacks were made on Toksan Dam about 20 miles (32 km) north of Pyongyang, and the Chasan Dam, a few miles to the east. The resulting floods extensively damaging rice fields, buildings, bridges, and roads. Most importantly, 2 main rail lines were disabled for several days. While unable to cope with the MiG-15 at high altitude, they were more effective at medium or low altitudes and scored several kills. RF-84s were used for reconnaissance.
- North American F-86A/E/F Sabre
  The F-86 Sabre survived many initial teething problems to become the premier USAF fighter of the Korean War. By the end of hostilities, all but one pilots in the UN airfleet, who claimed the status of ace flew a model of the F-86. Later models were more powerful and used both for air-to-air and ground support. The RF-86 was used for reconnaissance.

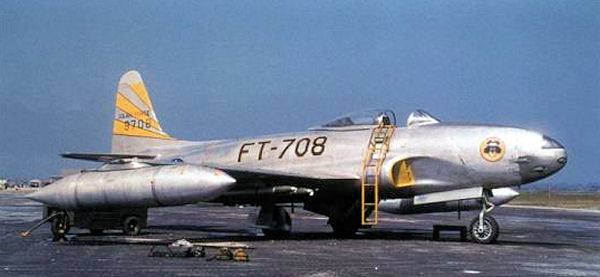
Lockheed F-80C-10-LO Shooting Star 49-8708 of the 8th Fighter-Bomber Group, Korea, 1950

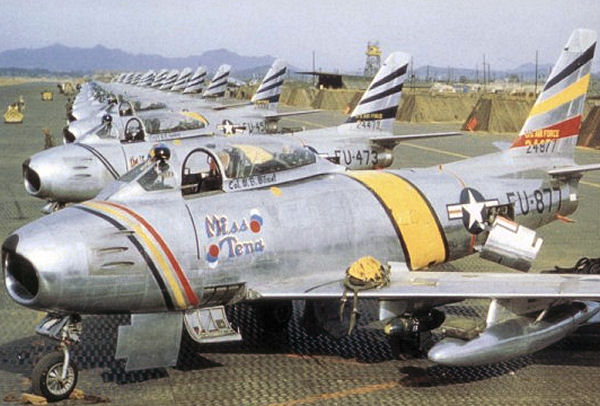
North American F-86F-30-NA Sabres of the 8th Fighter-Bomber Group, Korea, 1953. Serial 52-4877 in front in Wing Commander's colors, 52-4473 alongside

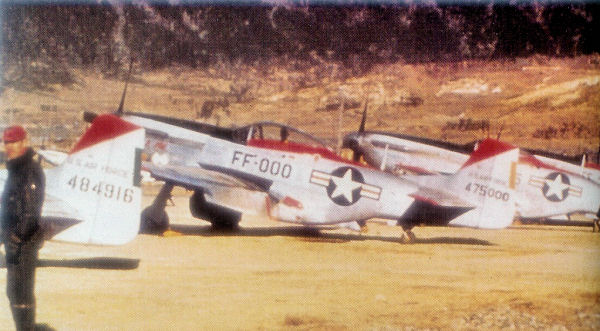
North American F-51D-25-NT Mustangs of the 67th Fighter-Bomber Squadron. Serials 44-84916 and 44-75000 identifiable

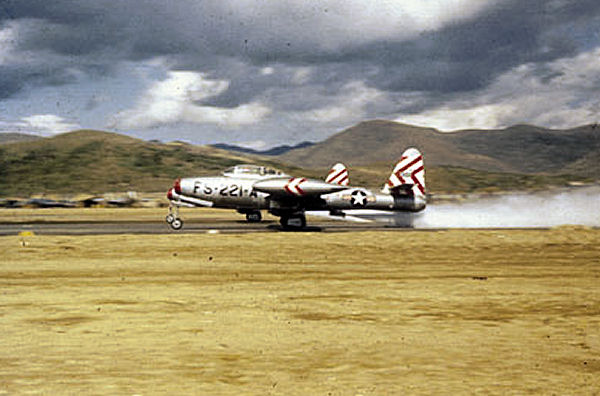
49th FBW Republic F-84E-25-RE Thunderjets taking off in Korea. Serial 51–221 in foreground.

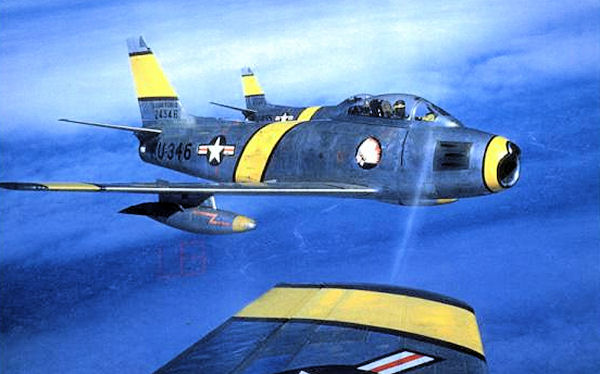
North American F-86F-25-NH Sabres of the 4th FIW over Korea. Serial 52-5346 identifiable

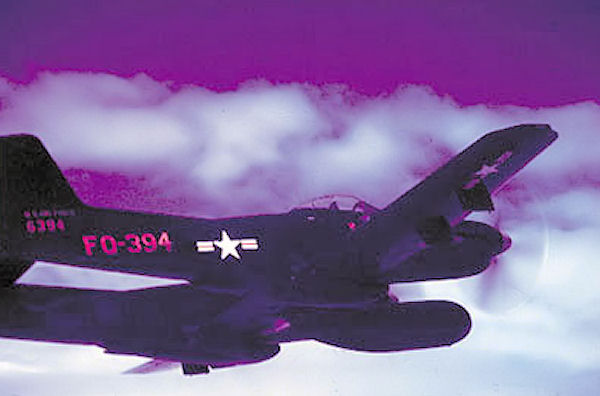
North American F-82G Twin Mustang Serial 46-394 of the 68th FIS in flight over the night skies of Korea

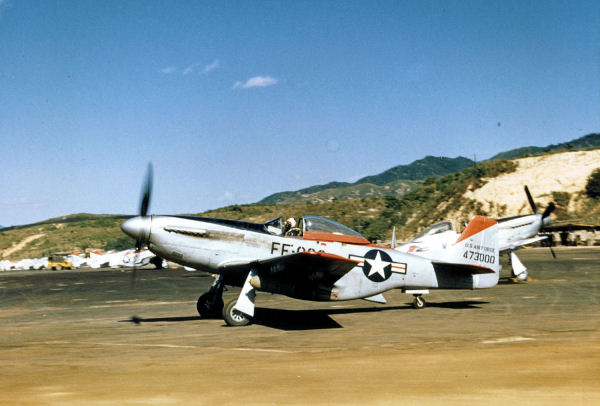
North American F-51D-25-NA Mustang Serial 44-73000 in Korea

==== Fighter units ====
- 4th Fighter-Interceptor Wing (Deployed) (F-86 Sabre)

Attached to Fifth Air Force, 28 November 1950 – 7 March 1955

Further attached to 314th Air Division 22 December 1950 – 7 May 1951
Further attached to 39th Air Division, 1–7 March 1955

Stationed at: Johnson AB, Japan, 28 November 1950; Suwon AB, South Korea, 7 May 1951; Kimpo AB, South Korea, 23 August 1951 – 1 October 1954

- 8th Fighter-Bomber Wing (F-80 Shooting Star, F-82 Twin Mustang, F-86 Sabre)

Fifth Air Force, 1 March 1950 – 1 March 1955

Attached to 6131 Fighter [later, 6131 Tactical Support] Wing, 14 August-1 December 1950

Stationed at: Itazuke Air Field, Japan, 1 March 1950; Pyongyang, North Korea, 1 December 1950; Seoul AB, South Korea, 9 December 1950; Itazuke AB, Japan, 10 December 1950; Kimpo AB, South Korea, 25 June 1951; Suwon AB, South Korea, 23 August 1951 – 10 October 1954

- 18th Fighter-Bomber Wing (F-51 Mustang, F-80 Shooting Star, F-86 Sabre)

Thirteenth Air Force, 1 June 1950

Attached to: Fifth Air Force, 28 July-3 August 1950
Attached to: 6002 Fighter [later, 6002 Tactical Support] Wing, 4 August-30 November 1950
Attached to: Fifth Air Force, 1 December 1950 – 31 October 1954

Stationed at: Pusan AB, South Korea, 1 December 1950; Pyongyang East, North Korea, 1 December 1950; Suwon AB, South Korea, 4 December 1950; Chinhae, South Korea, 10 December 1950; Osan-ni, South Korea, 26 December 1952 – 1 November 1954

- 27th Fighter-Escort Wing (Deployed) (F-84 Thunderjet)

Attached to Far East Air Forces, 19–29 November 1950
Attached to Fifth Air Force, 30 November 1950 – 15 July 1951
42d Air Division, 6 August 1951

Attached to Far East Air Forces, 6–13 October 1952
Attached to 39th Air Division [Defense], 13 October 1952-c. 13 February 1953

Stationed at: Taegu AB, South Korea, 5 December 1950; Itazuke AB, Japan, 31 January-2 July 1951; Bergstrom AFB, TX, 6 July 1951 – 16 June 1952. Misawa AB, Japan during 6 October 1952 – 13 February 1953

- 35th Fighter-Interceptor Wing (F-51 Mustang, F-80 Shooting Star, F-82 Twin Mustang, F-94 Starfire)

Fifth Air Force, 1 March 1950
314th Air Division, 25 May 1951
Japan Air Defense Force, 1 March 1952
Fifth Air Force, 1 September 1954
Stationed at: Yokoto AB, Japan, 1 April 1950; Johnson AB, Japan, 14 August 1950; Yongho, North Korea, 1 December 1950; Pusan AB, South Korea, c. 7 December 1950; Johnson AB, Japan, 25 May 1951 – 1 October 1954

- 49th Fighter-Bomber Wing (F-51 Mustang, F-80 Shooting Star, F-84 Thunderjet)

Fifth Air Force, 1 March 1950

Attached to 58 Fighter-Bomber Wing, 16–31 March 1953

Japan Air Defense Force, 1 April 1953

Attached to Fifth Air Force, 1 April-7 November 1953

Stationed at: Misawa AB, Japan, 18 August 1948; Taegu AB, South Korea, 1 December 1950; Tsuki AB, Japan, 26 January 1951; Taegu AB, South Korea, 24 February 1951; Kunsan AB, South Korea, 1 April 1953 – 7 November 1953

- 51st Fighter-Interceptor Wing (F-80 Shooting Star, F-82 Twin Mustang, F-86 Sabre)

Twentieth Air Force, 16 May 1949

Attached to Fifth Air Force, 25 September 1950 – 1 August 1954

Further attached to 8 Fighter-Bomber Wing, 25 September-12 October 1950

Stationed at: Naha Afld (later, AB), Okinawa, 18 August 1948; Itazuke AB, Japan, 22 September 1950; Kimpo AB, South Korea, 10 October 1950; Itazuke AB, Japan, 10 December 1950; Tsuiki AB, Japan, 15 January 1951; Suwon AB, South Korea, 1 October 1951 – 26 July 1954

- 58th Fighter-Bomber Wing (Deployed) (F-84 Thunderjet)

Tactical Air Command, 10 July 1952

Attached to Fifth Air Force, 10 July 1952 – 28 February 1955

Stationed at: Itazuke AB, Japan, 10 July 1952; Taegu AB, South Korea, August 1952– 15 March 1955

- 116th Fighter-Bomber Wing (Deployed) (F-84 Thunderjet)

Federalized Georgia Air National Guard

Assigned to Tactical Air Command, October 1950
Attached to Far East Air Forces, July 1951

Further Attached to Fifth Air Force, July 1951 – 10 July 1952

Released from Active Service 10 July 1952
Stationed at: Itazuke AB, Japan

- 136th Fighter-Bomber Wing (Deployed) (F-84 Thunderjet)

Federalized Texas Air National Guard
Consisted of:

111th Fighter-Bomber Squadron (Ellington Field, Houston)
182nd Fighter-Bomber Squadron (Brooks Air Force Base)
154th Fighter-Bomber Squadron (Little Rock Airport)

Assigned to Tactical Air Command 27 June 1950
Attached to Far East Air Forces, 1951

Further Attached to Fifth Air Force, July 1951 – 10 July 1952

Released from Active Service 1952
Stationed at: Itazuke AB, Japan

- 474th Fighter-Bomber Wing (Deployed) (F-84 Thunderjet)

Activated 10 July 1952, assigned to Tactical Air Command
Attached to Far East Air Forces,

Further Attached to Fifth Air Force, August 1952 – November 1954

Stationed at: Misawa, Japan, 10 July 1952; Kunsan, Korea, 10 July 1952; Taegu, Korea, 1 April 1953 – 22 November 1954

- 319th Fighter-Interceptor Squadron (Deployed) (F-94 Starfire)

Assigned to Strategic Air Command, 90th Bombardment Wing
Attached to Far East Air Forces,

Further Attached to Fifth Air Force, February 1952 – June 1953

Stationed at: Suwon AB, South Korea, (March 1952 – June 1953)

Source for unit history:

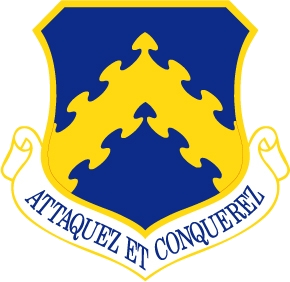
8th Fighter-Bomber Wing

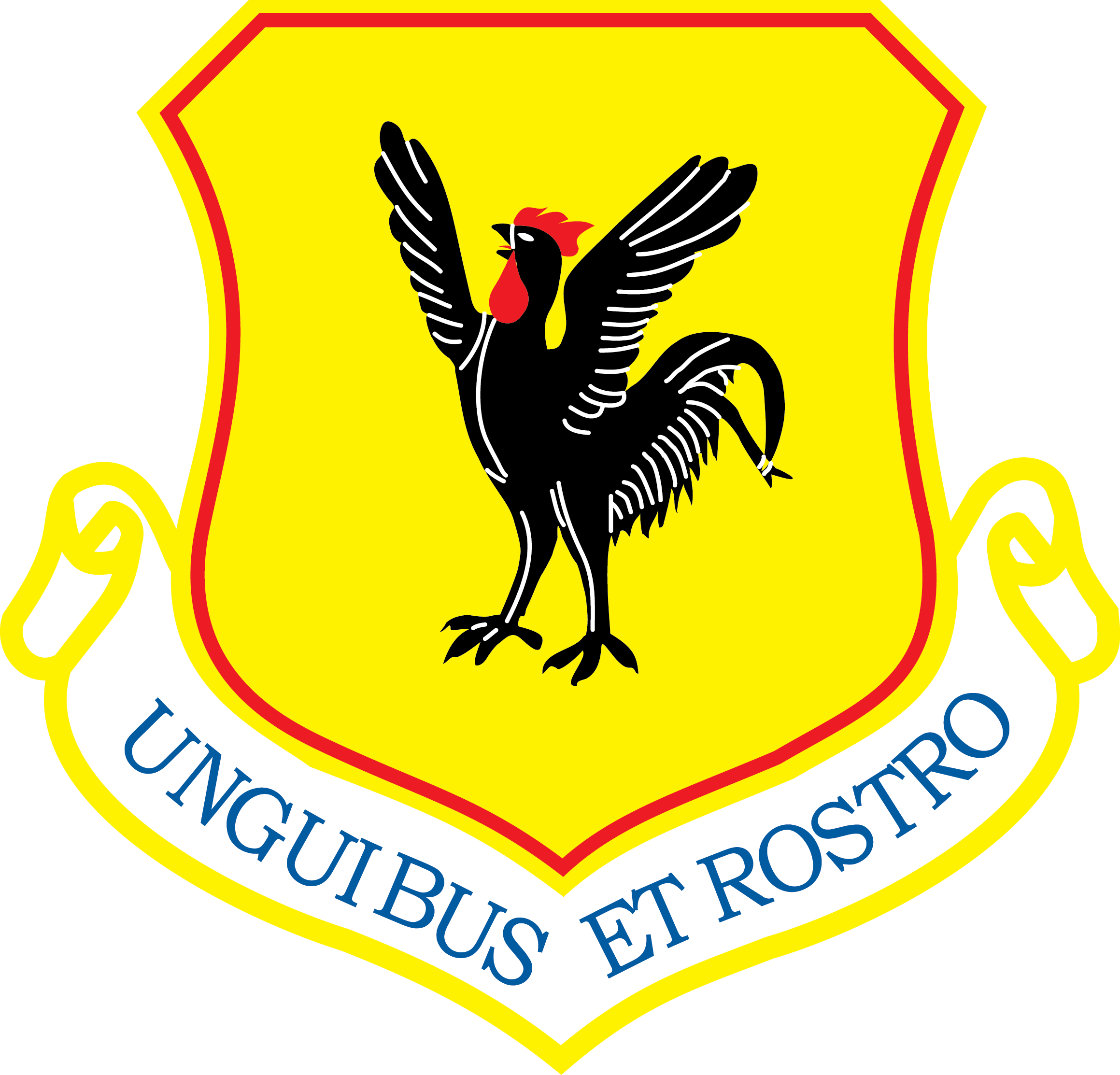
18th Fighter-Bomber Wing

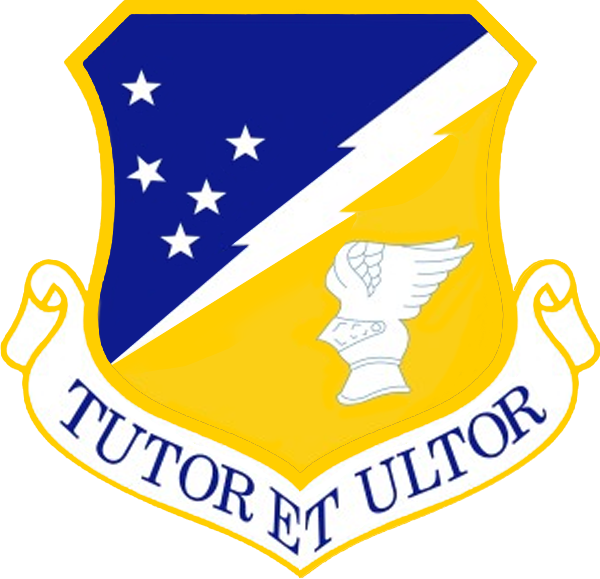
49th Fighter-Bomber Wing

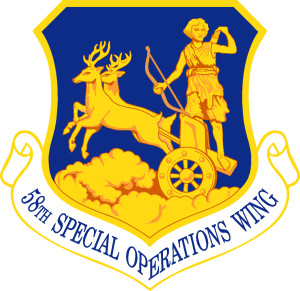
58th Fighter-Bomber Wing

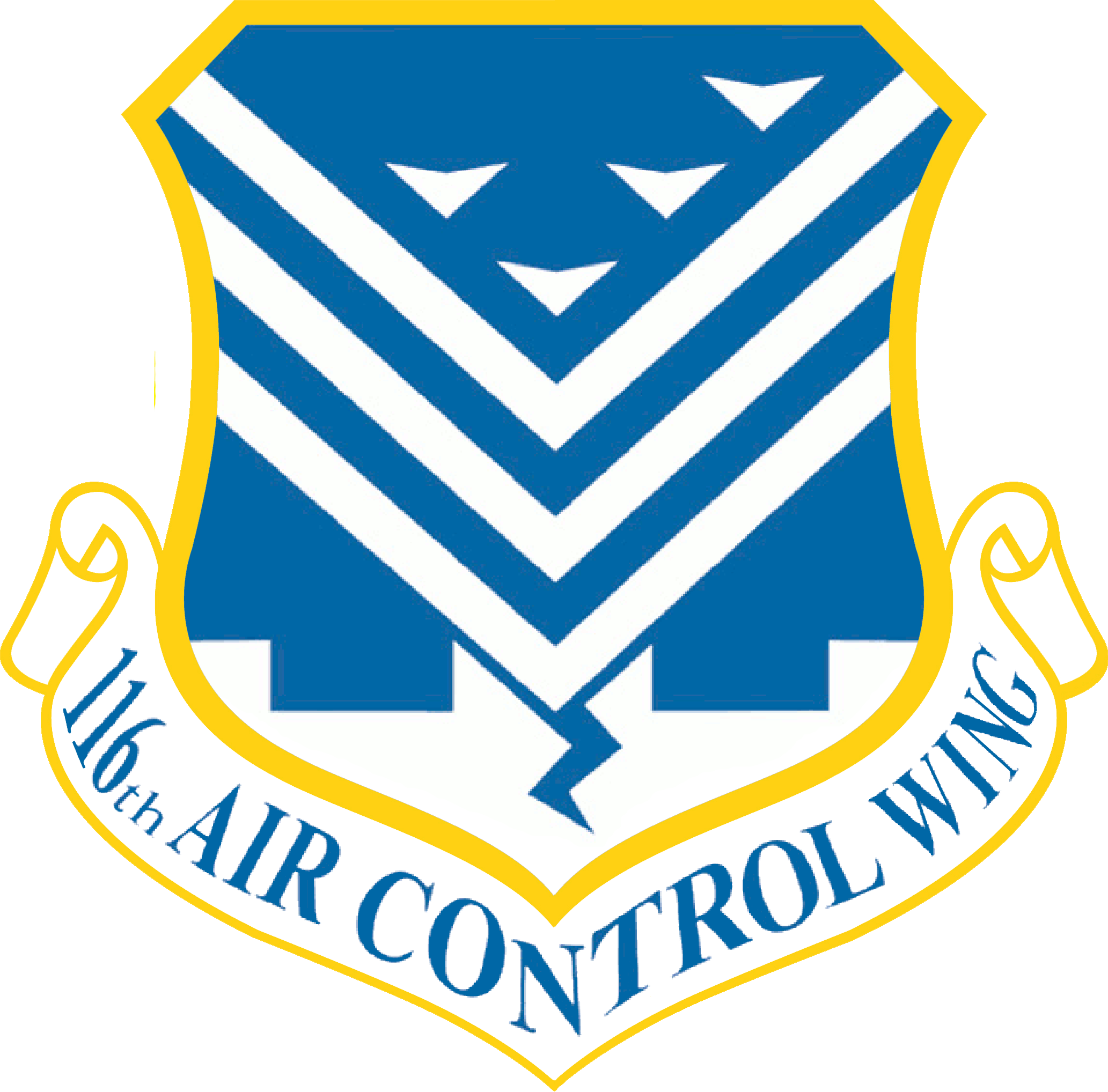
116th Fighter-Bomber Wing

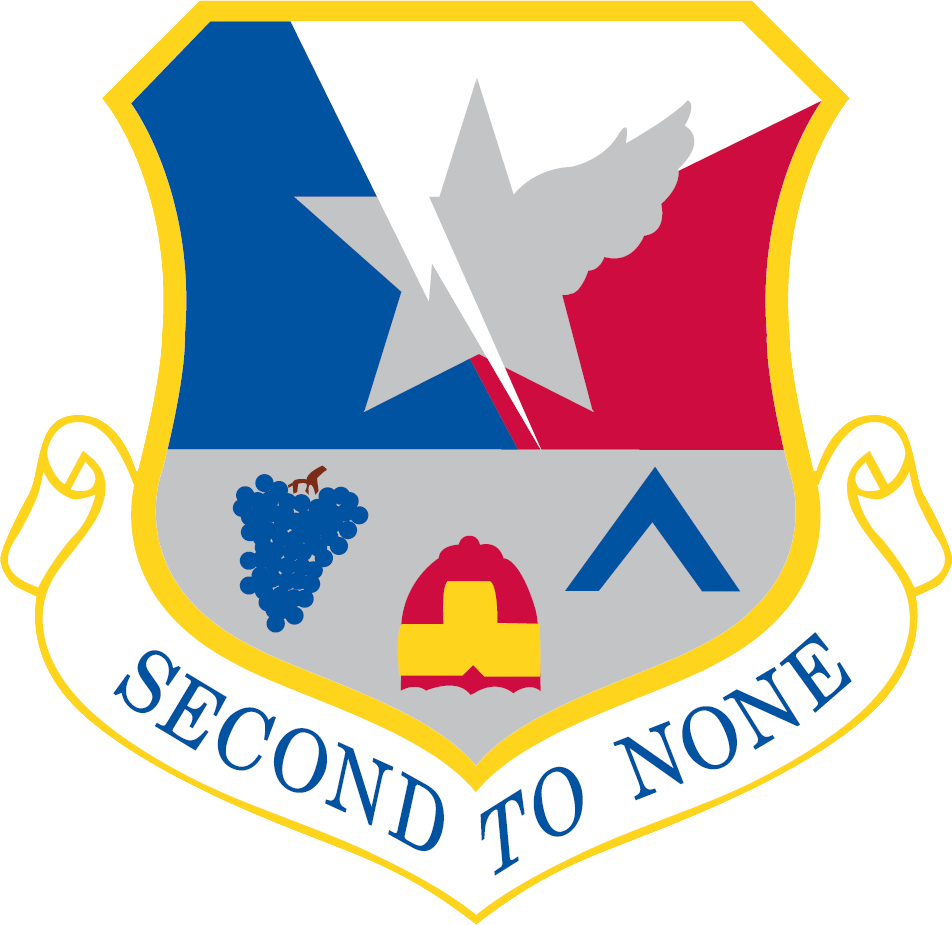
136th Fighter-Bomber Wing

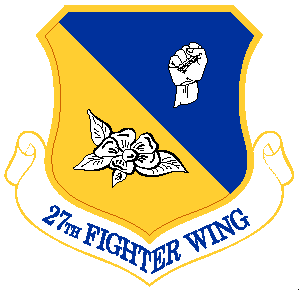
27th Fighter-Escort Wing

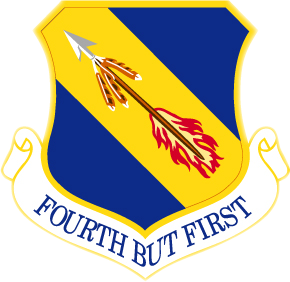
4th Fighter-Interceptor Wing

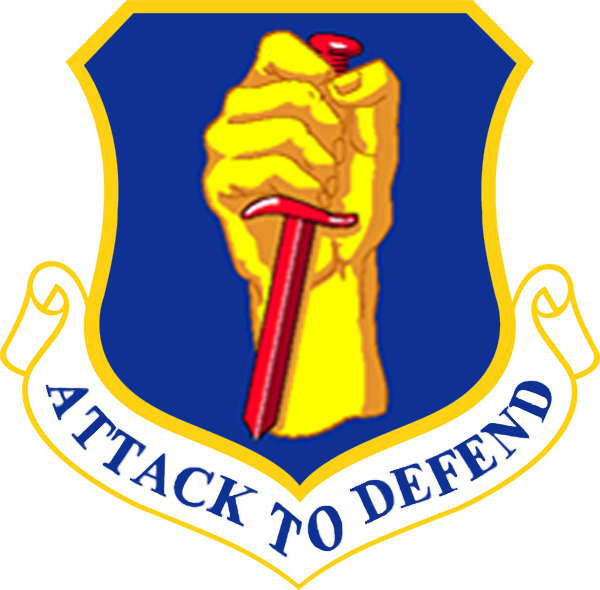
35th Fighter-Interceptor Wing

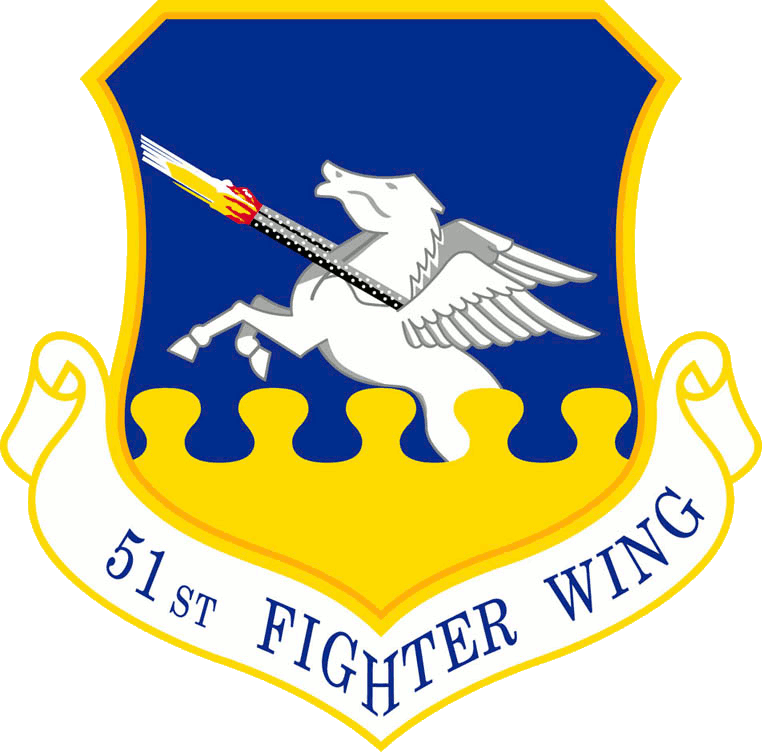
51st Fighter-Interceptor Wing

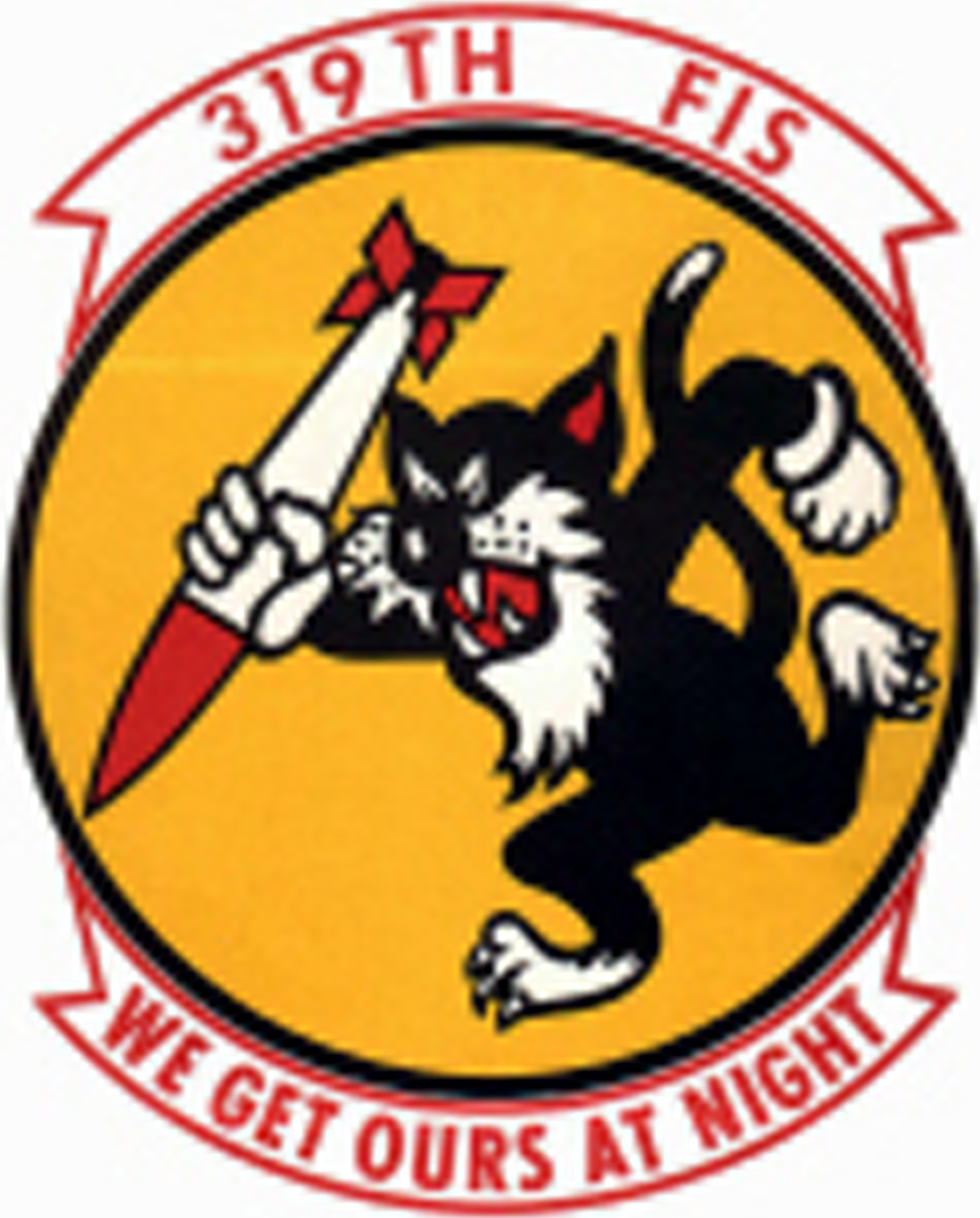
319th Fighter-Interceptor Squadron

=== Bombers ===
==== Types employed ====
- Boeing B-29 Superfortress
  By 1950, the B-29s had been reclassified as "medium" bombers, their long-range strategic mission having been taken over by the B-36 and B-50. Many aircraft were retrieved from postwar storage and refurbished. At least 16 B-29s were shot down over North Korea, and as many as 48 were lost in crash landings or written off because of heavy damage after returning to base. When the Korean War ended on 27 July 1953, the B-29s had flown over 21,000 sorties, nearly 167,000 tons of bombs had been dropped, and 34 B-29s had been lost in combat (16 to fighters, four to flak, and fourteen to other causes). B-29 gunners had accounted for 34 Communist fighters (16 of these being MiG-15s) probably destroyed another 17 (all MiG-15s) and damaged 11 (all MiG-15s). Losses were less than 1 per 1000 sorties. The bombers were also used as reconnaissance (RB-29), weather (WB-29), and rescue aircraft (SB-29).
- Douglas B-26B/C Invader
  When the North Korean army invaded the South on 25 June 1950, the USAF was critically short of light bombers. The B-26 Invaders in Japan proved to be invaluable in the night interdiction role, and it fell to the B-26 to fly the first and the last bombing missions of the Korean War. Their first mission was on 28 June 1950 when they attacked railroads supplying enemy forces. Their first attack against North Korea was on 29 June, when they bombed Pyongyang Air Base, the main airfield in Pyongyang. The Invaders flew some 60,000 sorties and were credited with the destruction of 38,500 vehicles, 3,700 railway cars, and 406 locomotives. The B-26 had the honor of flying the last combat sortie of the Korean War, when, 24 minutes before the Armistice Agreement went into effect on 27 July 1953 a B-26 of the 3rd BW dropped the last bombs of the Korean war. The bombers were also used for reconnaissance, as RB-26s.

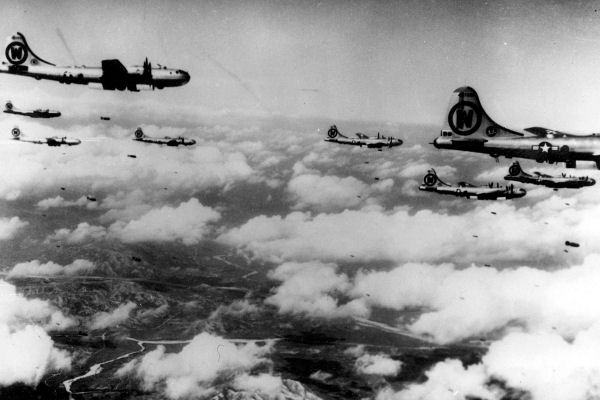
Formation of B-29s over the daytime skies of North Korea.

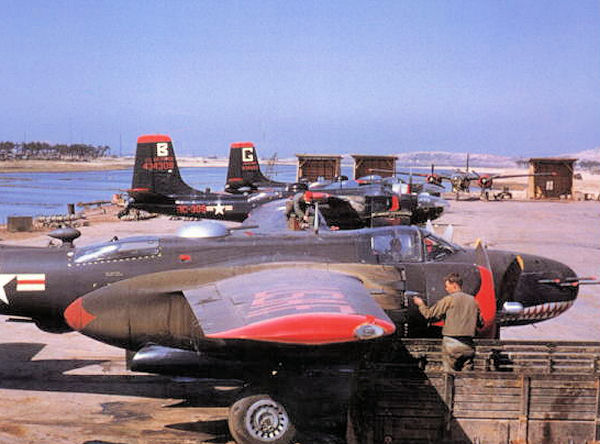
3d Bomb Wing B-26B Invaders during the Korean War. Serial 44-34306 identifiable.

==== Bombardment units ====
Far East Air Forces (FEAF)

- Far East Air Force Bomber Command

Twentieth Air Force
Kadena Air Base, Okinawa
19th Bombardment Group (B-29) (June 1950 – May 1954)

28th Bombardment Squadron
30th Bombardment Squadron
93d Bombardment Squadron

Inactivated 19th BW assigned to SAC, June 1954

Strategic Air Command (SAC)

- Attached to: Far East Air Force Bomber Command

Kadena Air Base, Okinawa
22d Bombardment Group (B-29), (Jul–October 1950)

2d Bombardment Squadron
19th Bombardment Squadron
33d Bombardment Squadron

307th Bombardment Group (B-29), (August 1950 – November 1954)

370th Bombardment Squadron
371st Bombardment Squadron
372d Bombardment Squadron

Yokota Air Base, Japan
92d Bombardment Group (B-29), (July–October 1950)

325th Bombardment Squadron
326th Bombardment Squadron
327th Bombardment Squadron

98th Bombardment Group (B-29), (August 1950 – July 1954)

342d Bombardment Squadron
343d Bombardment Squadron
344th Bombardment Squadron
345th Bombardment Squadron

Fifth Air Force

- 3d Bombardment Wing (B-26 Invader) 1 March 1950 – 1 March 1955

Stationed at: Johnson AB, Japan, 1 April 1950; Yokota AB, Japan, 14 August 1950; Iwakuni AB, Japan, 1 December 1950; Kunsan AB, South Korea, 22 August 1951 – 1 October 1954

- 17th Bombardment Wing (B-26 Invader) 10 May 1952 – 16 March 1955

Stationed at: Pusan-East AB, South Korea, 10 May 1952 – 10 October 1954

- 452d Bombardment Wing (B-26 Invader) 15 November 1950 – 10 May 1952

Attached to: 8 Fighter-Bomber Wing, 15–30 November 1950
Attached to: 314th Air Division, 1 December 1950 – 10 May 1952
Stationed at: Itazuke AB, Japan, 26 October 1950; Miho AB, Japan, c. 10 December 1950; Pusan-East AB, South Korea, 23 May 1951 – 10 May 1952

Source for unit history:

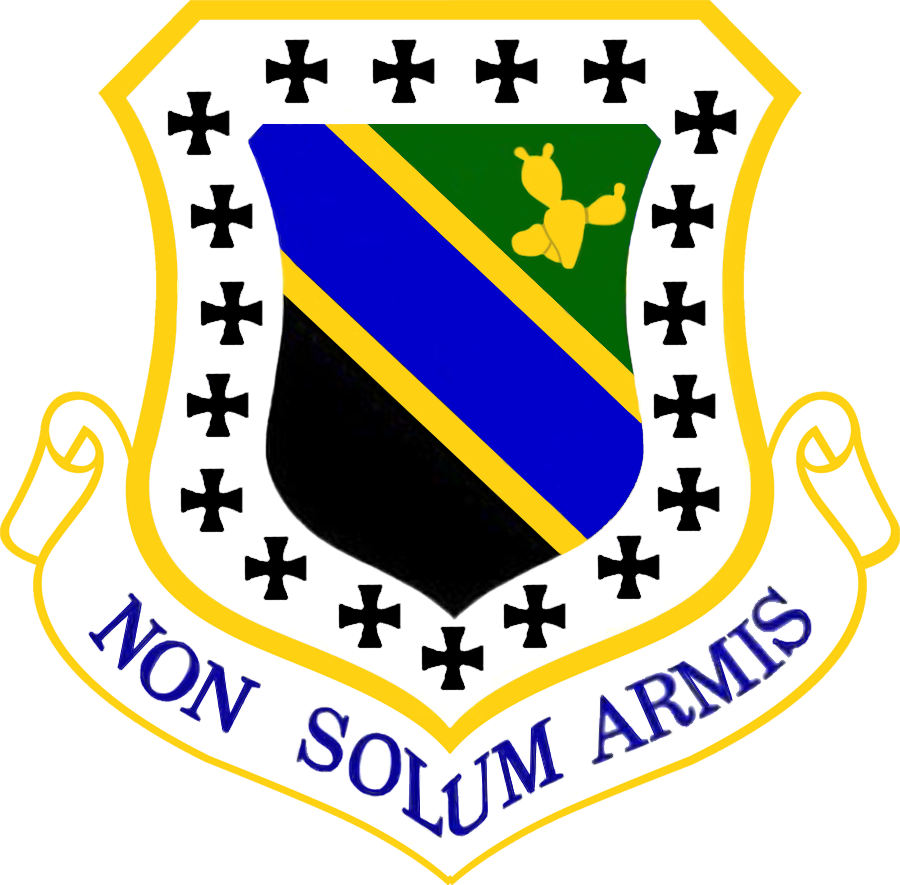
3d Bombardment Wing (Light)

17th Bombardment Wing (Light)

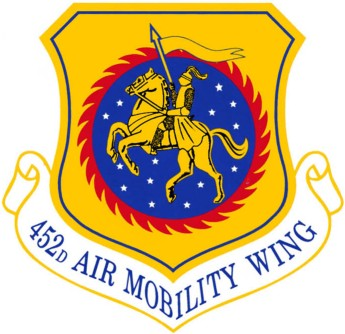
452d Bombardment Wing (Light)

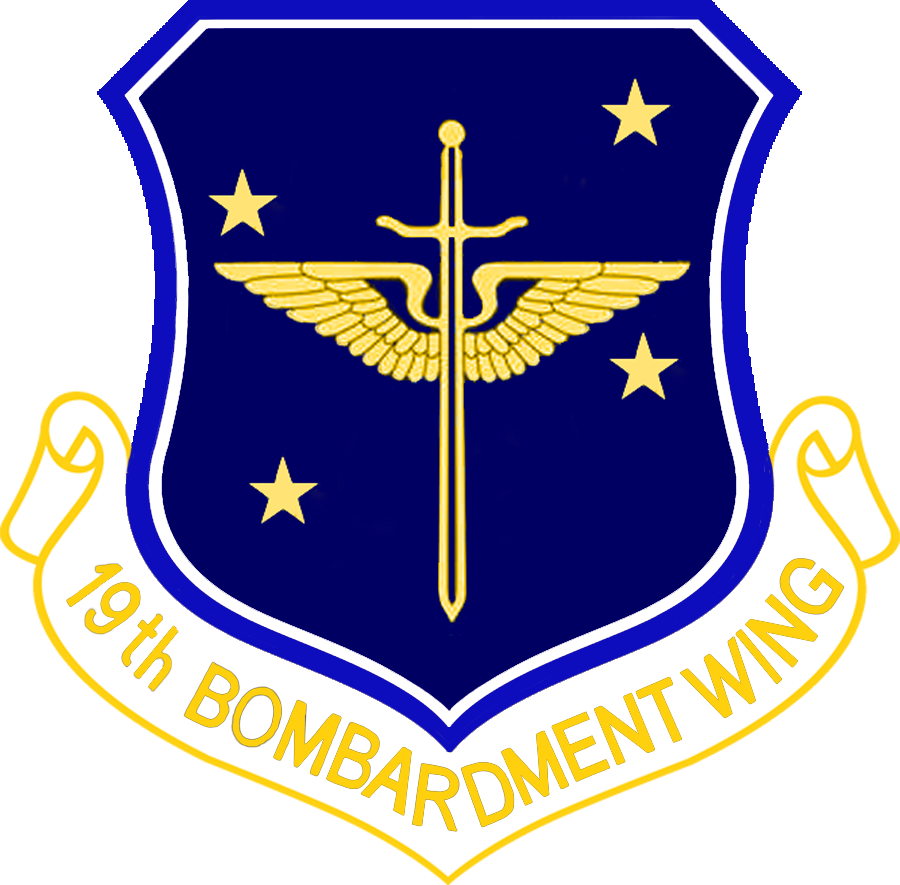
19th Bombardment Wing, Medium

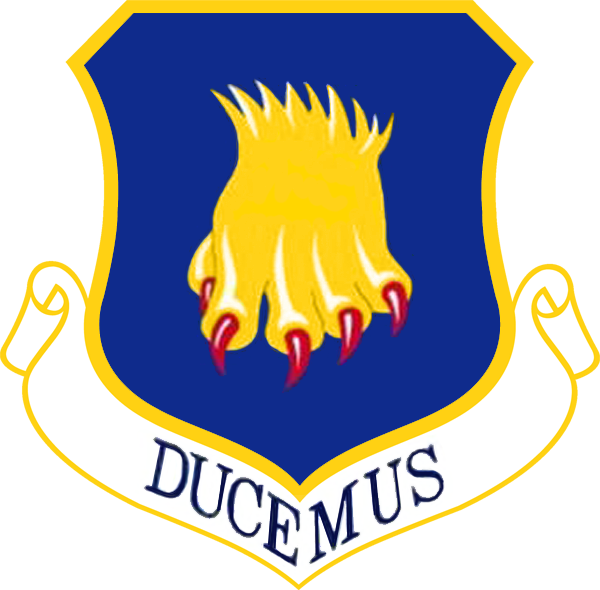
22nd Bombardment Group, Medium

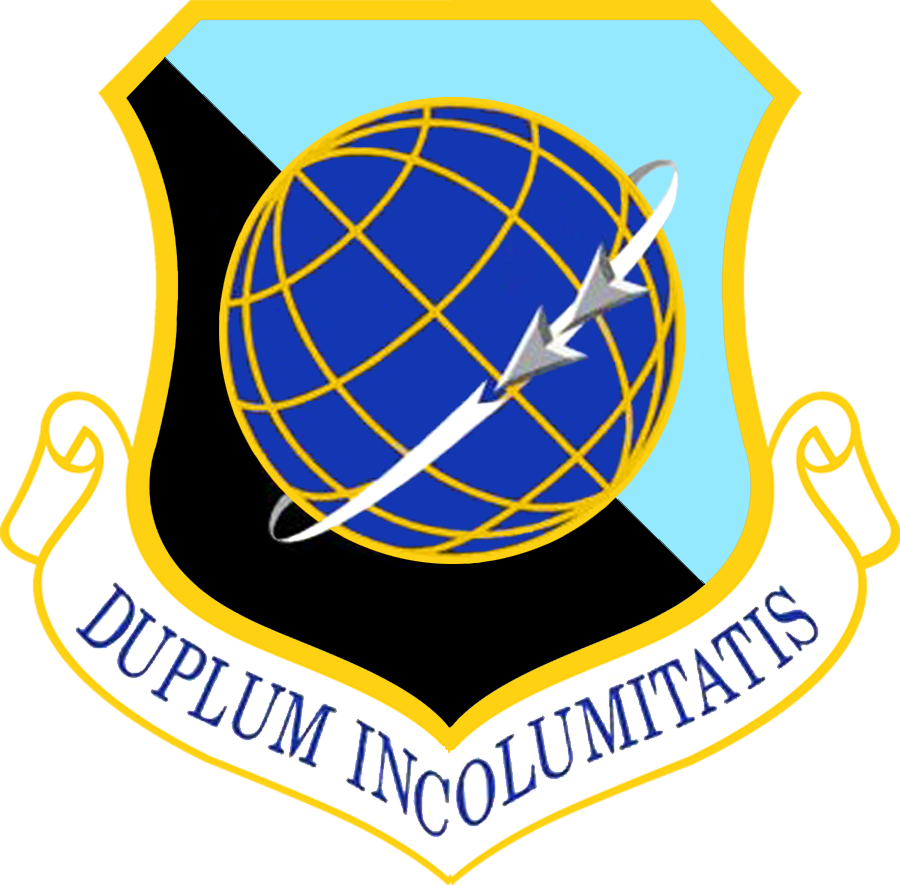
92nd Bombardment Wing, Medium

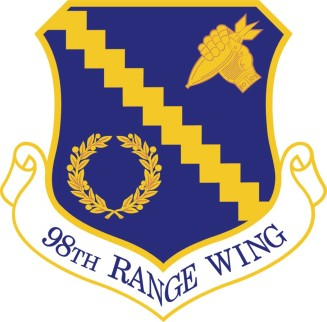
98th Bombardment Wing, Medium

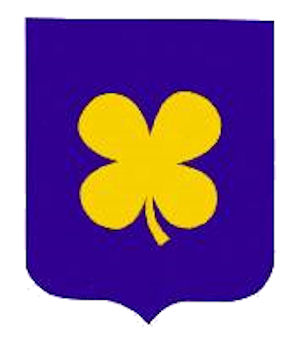
307th Bombardment Wing, Medium

=== Reconnaissance ===
==== Types employed ====
- RF-51D Mustang
  The RF-51D was the photo-reconnaissance version of the P-51D, known as the F-6A in World War II. During the advance and later the retreat of U.N. forces into and out of North Korea that fall and winter of 1950, the RF-51 performed many deep penetrations for armed reconnaissance far north of the battle zone into what would become known as "MiG Alley." They were among the first Mustangs to be hunted by MiG-15s; it was only the fact that the unit pilots were experienced Second World War combat veterans that they were able to avoid losses in those combats. The Air Force began exchanging their RF-51Ds for RF-80As in the fall of 1952. By the end of the Korean War all had been taken out of the inventory.
- RF-80A Shooting Star
  66 production P-80A fighters were converted by Lockheed into reconnaissance aircraft and given the designation RF-80A-15-LO. The RF-80A proved itself in combat during the Korean War and took part in numerous sorties over North Korea as well as sorties along the border with North Korea and China, near the Yalu River.
- RF-86A/F Sabre
  In 1953, several F-86Fs were fitted a suite of photo-reconnaissance cameras at the Tsuiki REMCO facility in Japan, in a project code-named Haymaker. All armament, radars, and gunsights were removed, and a camera suite fitted. In spite of the success of the RF-86 in combat, the USAF opted for the Republic RF-84F Thunderflash as its next-generation tactical reconnaissance aircraft.
- Boeing RB/SB-17G Flying Fortress
  The Boeing B-17 was adapted for photographic mapping by having its bombing equipment deleted and replaced by photographic equipment. Some cameras were installed in the nose and in the aft fuselage as well. The RB-17G was operated in the Korean theater by the 6204th Photo Mapping Flight for three months in 1950 before being replaced. The 3rd Air Rescue Group used the SB-17G which was a B-17 modified to carry a lifeboat under the fuselage for air/sea rescue. SB-17s operating in Korean waters were refitted with cheek, waist, and tail guns for defensive purposes.
- RB-29 Superfortress
  Nearly 120 B-29s were converted to the reconnaissance configuration and redesignated as RB-29s. The RB-29s were assigned to the 91st Strategic Reconnaissance Squadron, which like other SAC units played a crucial role during the Korean War.
- Boeing RB-50E Superfortress
  In November 1950, MiG-15s jumped a flak-damaged 91st SRS RB-29 near the Yalu river. In the ensuing aerial battle, the RB-29 rear gunner shot down one of the MiGs – the first MiG-15 shot down by a B-29 gunner. The RB-29 limped back to Johnson AB, Japan and five crewmen were killed when it crashed during landing. The immediate answer to the vulnerabilities of the RB-29's was the modified RB-50E, being an uprated version of the B-29. The RB-50Es operated out of Yokota AB, Japan, and was assigned to USAF's 91st Strategic Reconnaissance Squadron.
- North American RB-45C Tornado
  The Tornado was the first USAF four-jet bomber, and although the B-45 was available for combat in Korea, it was the RB-45 reconnaissance version that was used. First flown in April 1950, the Tornados managed to outrun and outmaneuver MiG's on numerous occasions, however they too eventually became targets. Many of these early missions were escorted by fighter aircraft and an eventual shift was made to night operations. The RB-45 operated out of Yokota AB Japan with the 91st Strategic Reconnaissance Squadron along with the 67th Tactical Reconnaissance Wing in Korea.
- Convair RB-36D Peacemaker
  The Peacemaker was used for strategic reconnaissance. In late 1952, six RB-36's were sent to Yokota Air Base, Japan with the 91st Strategic Reconnaissance Squadron to fly high altitude reconnaissance over Manchuria. In addition to bomb damage assessment, targeting and aerial photography for Far East Air Forces, the 91st conducted ELINT (Electronic Signals Intelligence) and "ferret" missions to probe Soviet air defenses in theater and give an indication of just where the holes were in Soviet radar coverage. The 91st SRS conducted the first ferret missions ever conducted by the USAF.

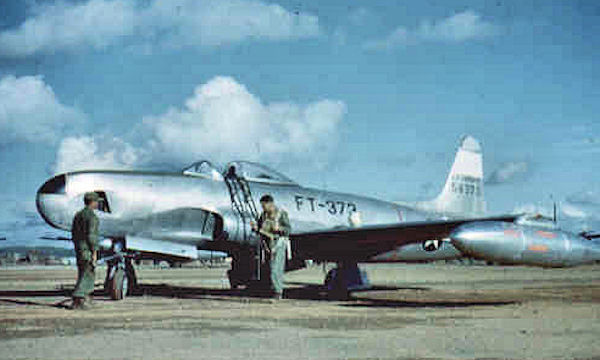
RF-80A in Korea about 1952

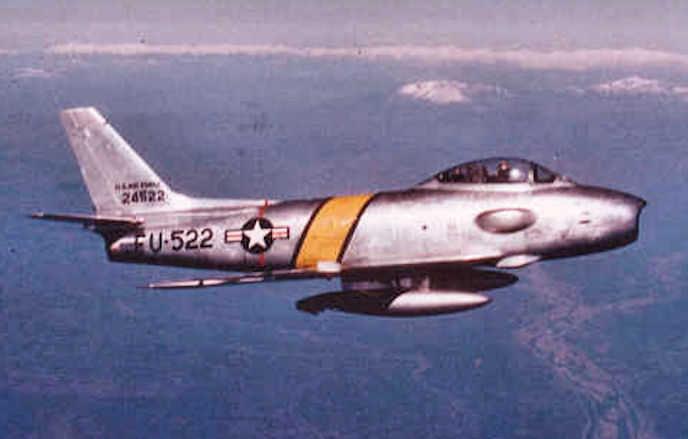
RF-86F over Korea about 1953

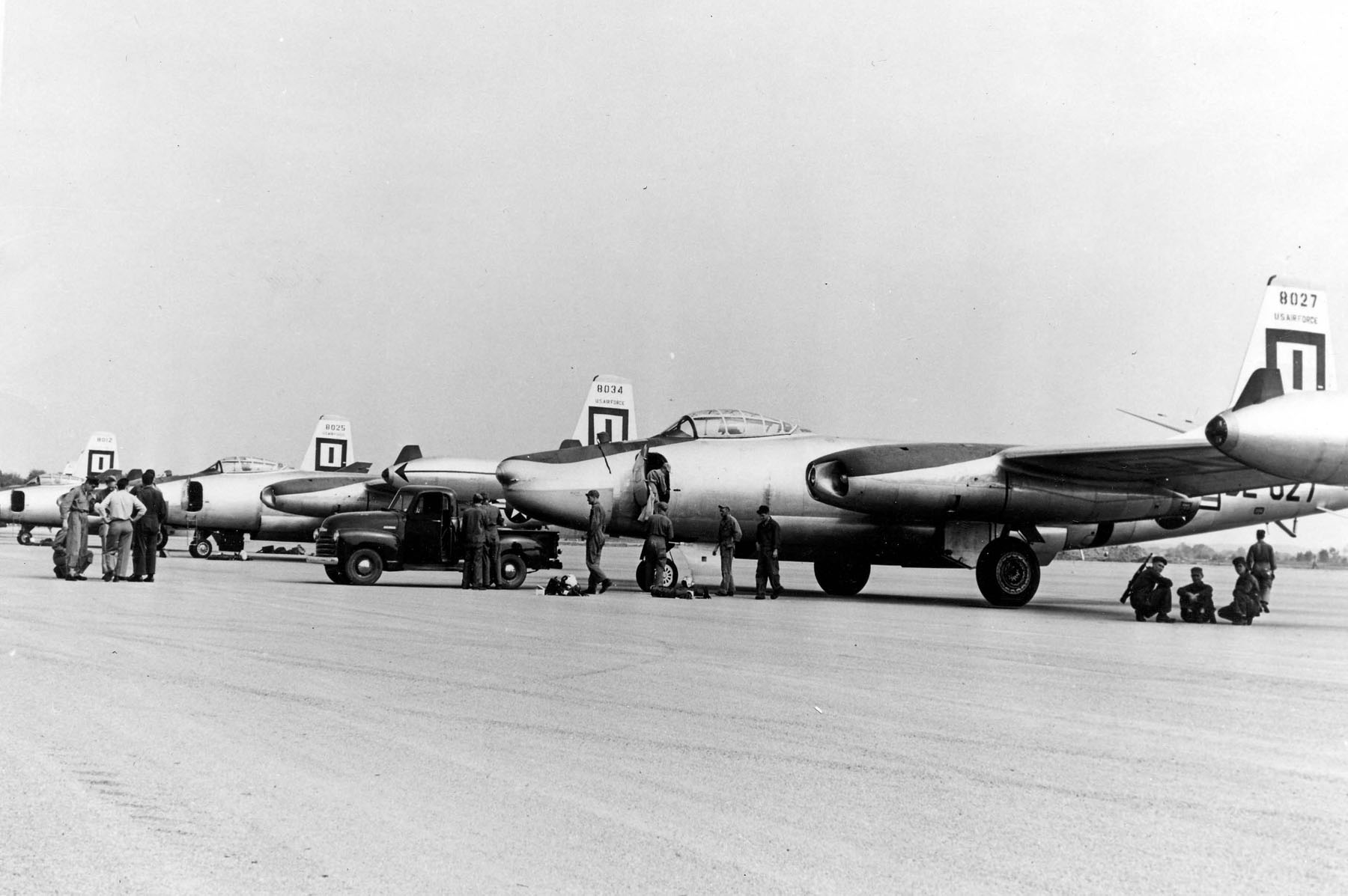
RB-45C Tornadoes

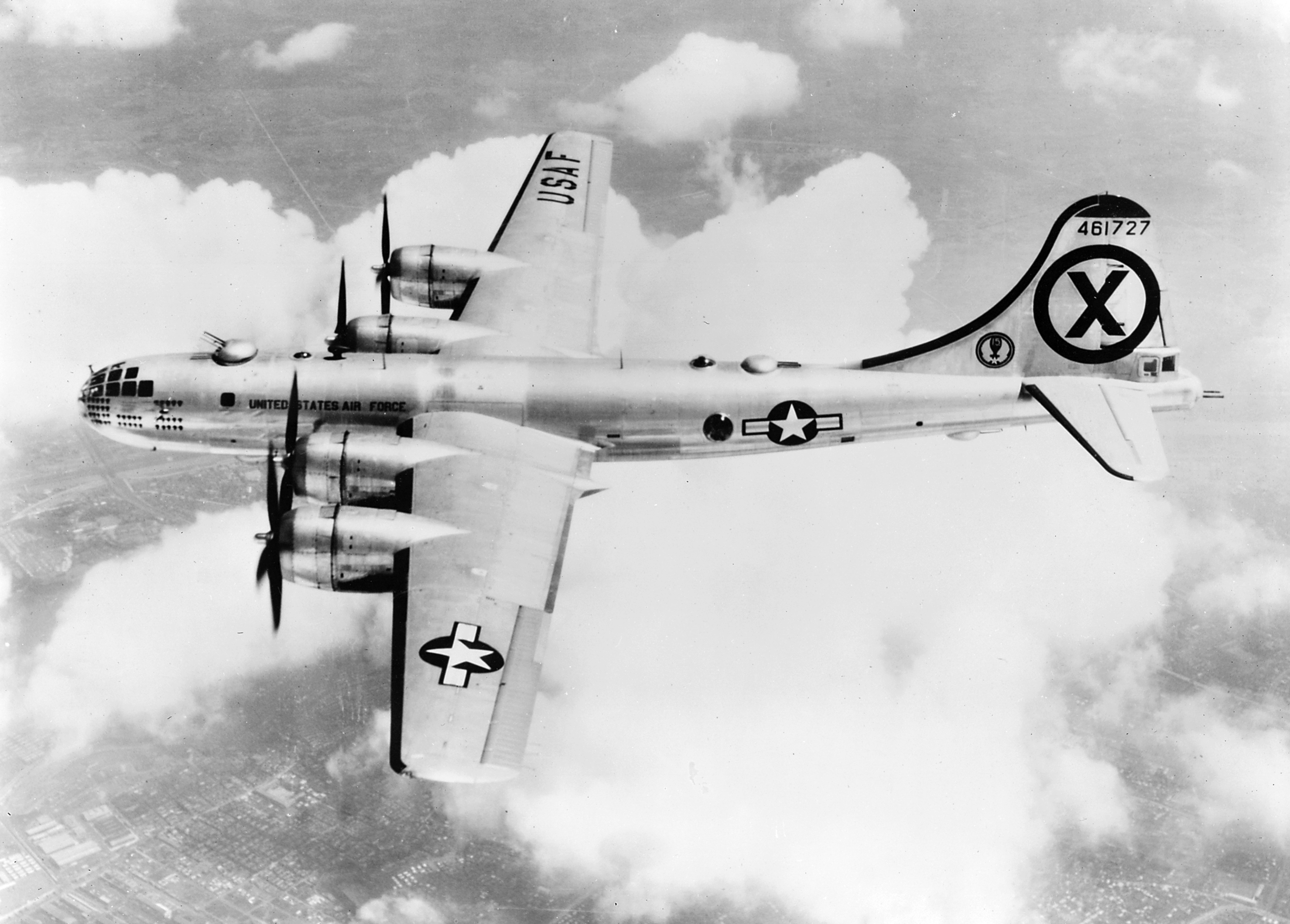
RB-29 of the 91st Strategic Reconnaissance Squadron

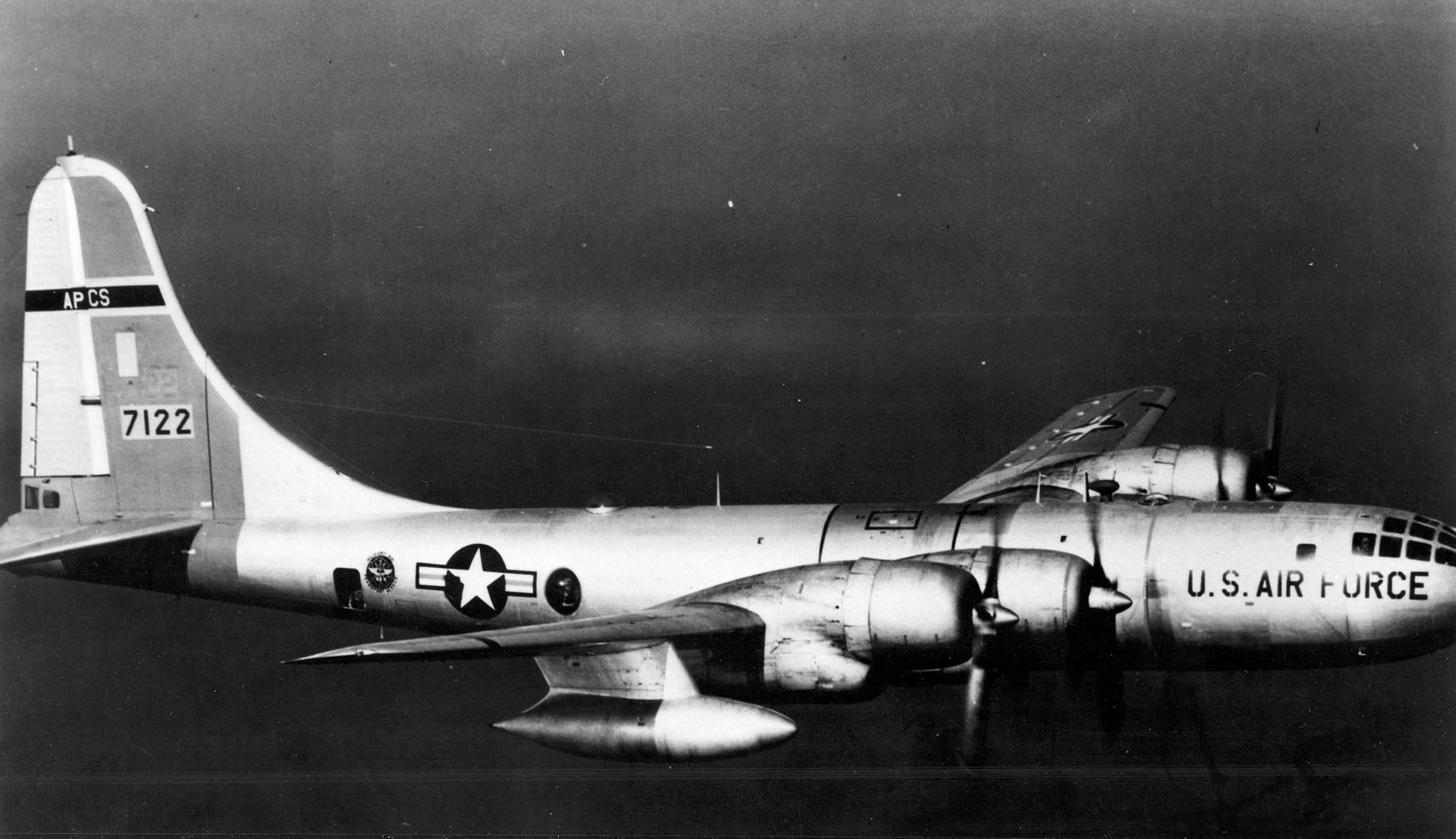
RB-50E in flight

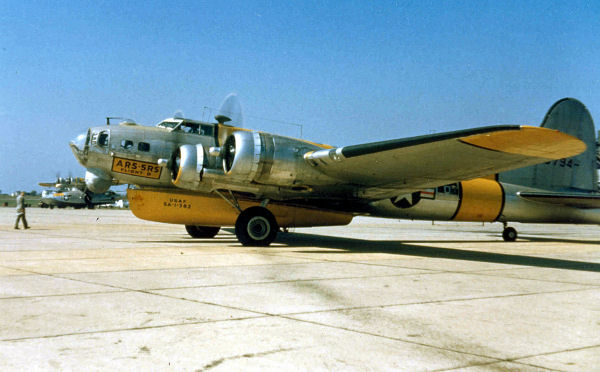
Boeing SB-17G of the 5th Rescue Squadron.

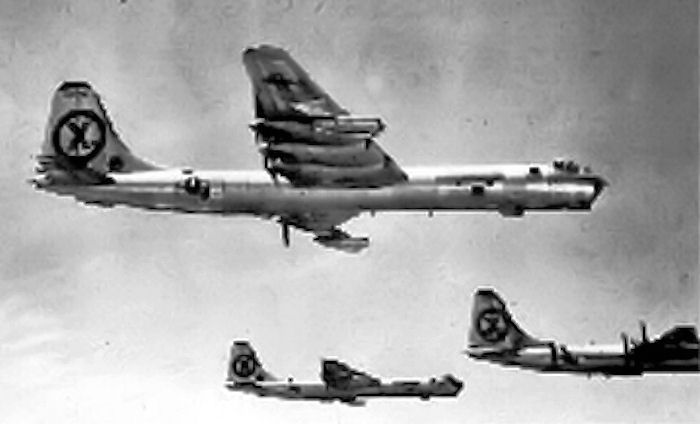
Formation of three 91st SRS RB-36s on a PSYOP mission over Korea

==== Reconnaissance units ====
- 543d Tactical Support Group (RB-26 Invader, RF-80A Shooting Star, RF-51D Mustang)

Fifth Air Force
Temporary Wartime Unit Consisted of:

8th Tactical Reconnaissance Squadron, Photographic
45th Tactical Reconnaissance Squadron
162nd Tactical Reconnaissance Squadron, Night Photographic
6166th Air Weather Reconnaissance Flight

Stationed at: Itazuke AB, Japan, September – October 1950; Taegu AB, South Korea (K-37), October 1950 – January 1951; Komaki AB, Japan, – 25 January February 1951
Unit inactivated 25 February 1951 – replaced by 67th Tactical Reconnaissance Wing

- 67th Tactical Reconnaissance Wing (RB-26 Invader, RF-80A Shooting Star, RF-51D Mustang, RF-86A/F Sabre)

Fifth Air Force, 25 February 1951 – 6 December 1954
Stationed at: Komaki AB, Japan February–March 1951; Taegu AB, South Korea March–August 1951; Kimpo AB, South Korea August 1951 – December 1954

- 31st Strategic Reconnaissance Squadron (RB-29 Superfortress)

Far East Air Forces 29 June – 15 November 1950,
Reassigned to Japan from Kadena AB, Okinawa
Stationed at: Johnson AB, Japan 29 June – 15 November 1950
Unit reassigned to 5th Strategic Reconnaissance Wing, Beale AFB, California. Replaced by 91st Strategic Reconnaissance Squadron

- 91st Strategic Reconnaissance Squadron (RB-29/RB-50 Superfortress, RB-45 Tornado, WB-26 Invader, KB-29 Superfortress (Tanker) and RB-36 Peacekeeper)

Far East Air Forces 15 November 1950 – 1954
Activated in Japan
Stationed at: Johnson AB, Japan November 1950, Yokota AB, Japan November 1950 – 1954

- 512th Reconnaissance Squadron (RB/WB–29 Superfortress)

Far East Air Forces 27 January 1950 – 20 February 1951
Performed weather reconnaissance
Stationed at: Yokota AB, Japan, 27 January 1950; Misawa AB, Japan, 11 August 1950 – 20 February 1951.
Replaced by 56th Strategic Reconnaissance Squadron

- 56th Strategic Reconnaissance Squadron (RB/WB–29 Superfortress)

Far East Air Forces 20 February 1951 – June 1952
Performed weather reconnaissance
Stationed at: Misawa AB, Japan, 20 February–September 1951; Yokota AB, Japan, September 1951 – June 1952

- 6204th Photo Mapping Flight Detachment 1 (RB-17G Flying Fortress)

Far East Air Forces
Stationed at: Johnson AB, Japan July – November 1950

Source for unit history:

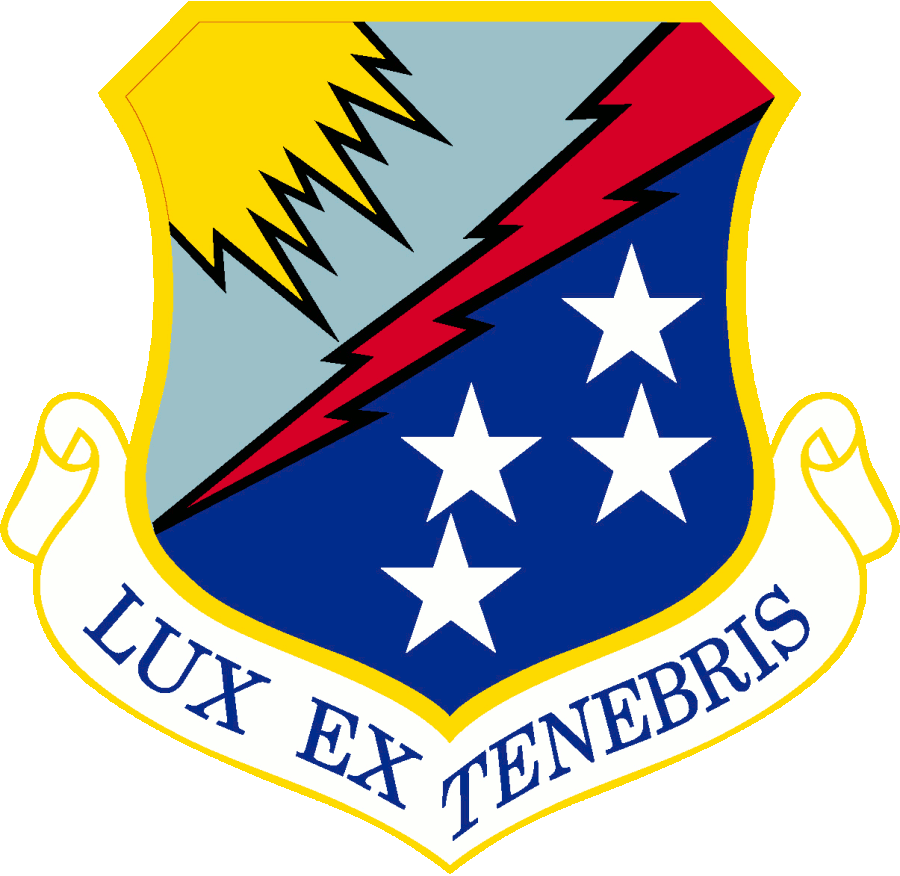
67th Tactical Reconnaissance Wing

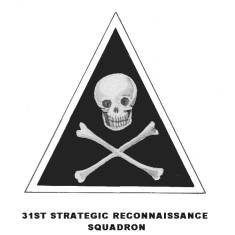
31st Strategic Reconnaissance Squadron

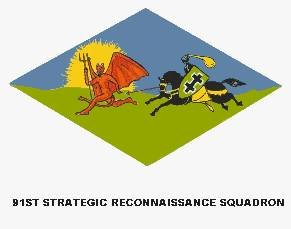
91st Strategic Reconnaissance Squadron

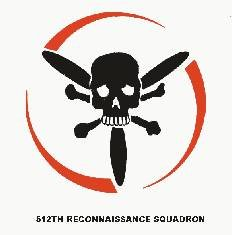
512th Reconnaissance Squadron

=== Transport ===
==== Types employed ====
- Douglas C-47/C-53 Skytrain
  Officially known as Skytrain but affectionately referred to as "Gooney Bird," the C-47 served in Korea as it had during World War II. During the Korean War, the C-47s hauled supplies, dropped paratroopers, evacuated the wounded, and pumped out flares to light the way for night bombing attacks.
- Fairchild C-119 Flying Boxcar
  The C-119 Flying Boxcar (officially called C-119 Packet) was used extensively in the Korean War. Despite logistics problems that kept monthly flying time averages low, the C-119 worked well in Korea, In addition to airlifting supplies, the C-119s performed other tasks. For example, during Operation SNOWBALL in the fall of 1951, the 315th Air Division used the aircraft to drop napalm-filled 55-gallon drums on enemy troops. The C-119's greatest feat during the Korean War, however, was a mission to aid the retreat of United States Marine Corps and Army troops from Chosin in December 1950. Air Force C-119 "Flying Boxcars" dropped supplies to the US Marines, but on 7 and 8 December the Chinese closed the sack by blowing the bridge across an otherwise impassible 1,500-foot (460 m)-wide gorge south of Koto-ri. Without help, the Marines would be forced to leave behind their heavy equipment and make it out on foot, a trek many of the wounded and frostbitten would not survive. Air Force C-119s again answered the call and dropped eight two-ton spans of a treadway bridge for Marine engineers, who kept the column moving by bridging the gap under intense fire.
- Douglas C-54 Skymaster
  A C-54 was the first USAF aircraft destroyed in the Korean War; one of the transports on the ground at Kimpo Airfield was strafed by North Korean aircraft on 25 June 1950. It was a Military Air Transport Service workhorse throughout the war.
- Curtiss C-46 Commando
  The World War II C-46 saw additional service during the Korean War being designed to carry troops or equipment and filled an airlift role in Korea, supplying everything from aircraft engines, ammunition, medical supplies, rations, and fresh fruit. The outbreak of the Korean War caught the US unprepared and scrambling for resources. C-46s were pulled out of mothballs or even bought back from commercial operators, and put into round-the-clock use with the USAF Combat Cargo Command. The C-46 was also used to spray insecticide over some parts of South Korea and to drop psychological warfare leaflets over North Korea.
- Douglas C-124 Globemaster II
  Performed heavy lift cargo operations to and from Korea. On 27 September 1951, a C-124A began FEAF-hosted service tests labeled Operation PELICAN. In a little over one month, the aircraft flew 26 missions between Japan and Korea, carrying an average load of 34,000 pounds, double the amount carried on the C-54. In one mission in 1951, a C-124 airlifted a record 167 patients from Pusan in South Korea. Unfortunately, because of the weight of the aircraft, it was limited to only four airstrips in Korea. A heavy-duty runway was constructed at Seoul Municipal Airport in October 1952, but logistical difficulties kept the C-124 from fulfilling its airlift potential. C-124s were used by the 374th Troop Carrier Wing and the 801st Medical Air Evacuation Squadron .

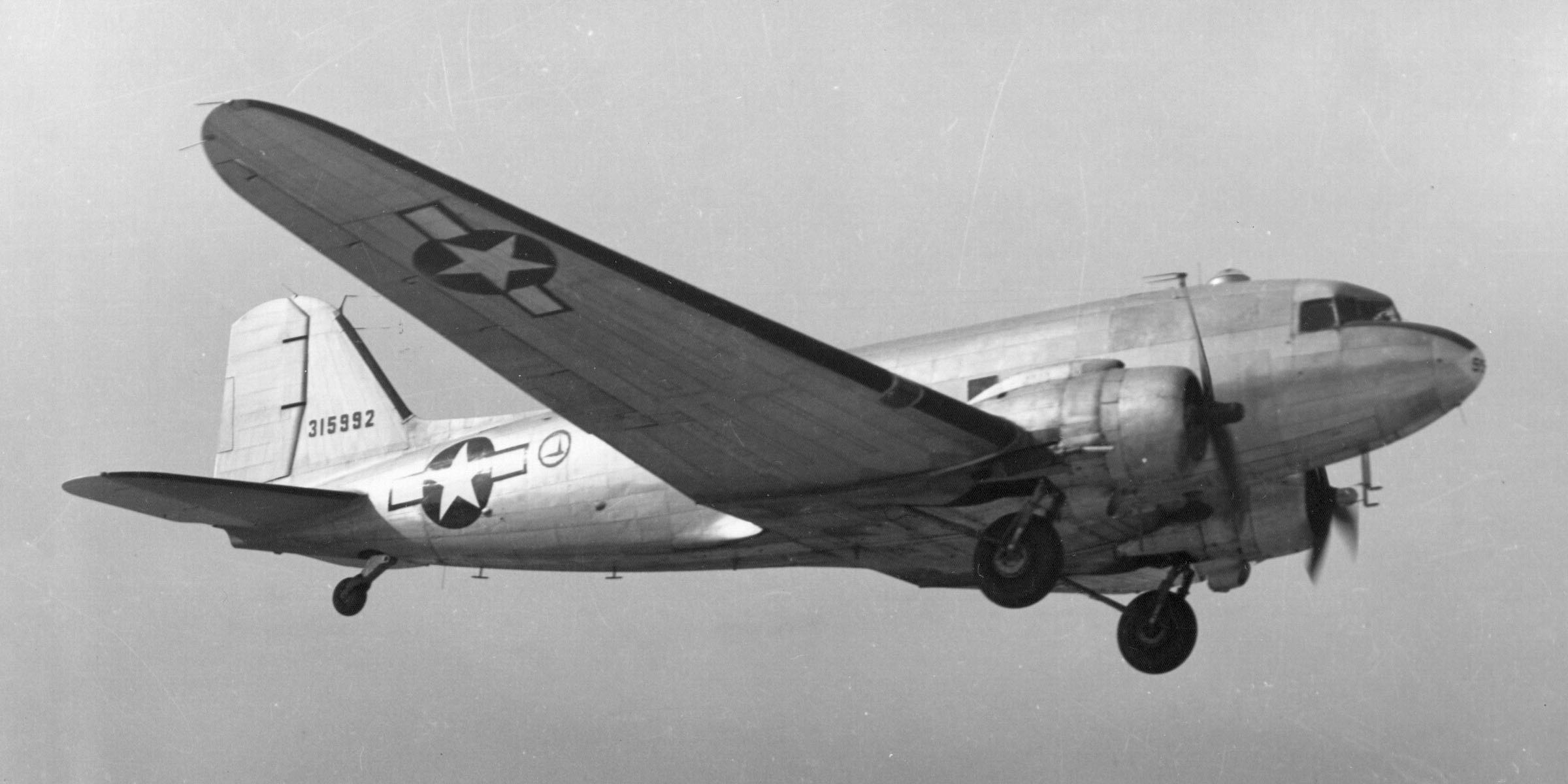
C-47 taking off

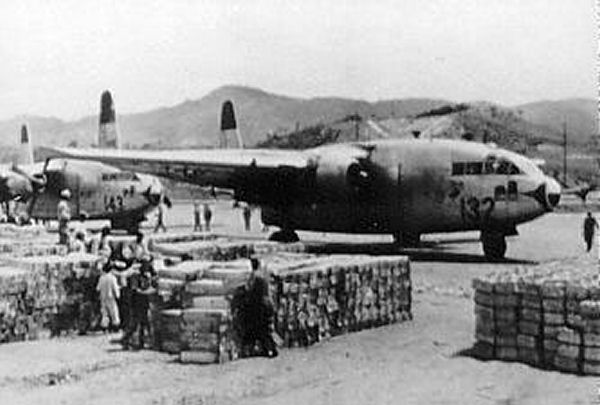
C-119 airlifting cargo from Japan to Korea.

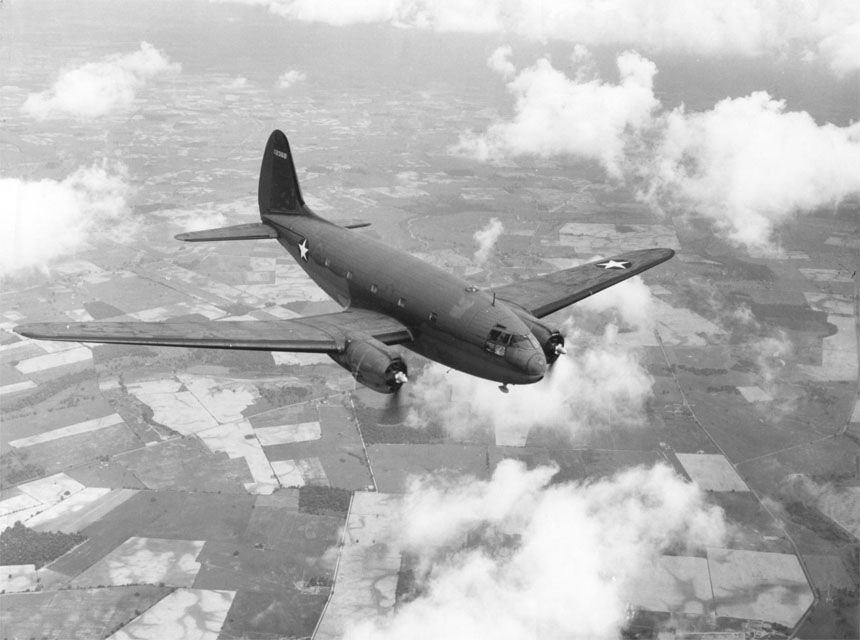
Curtiss C-46 Commando

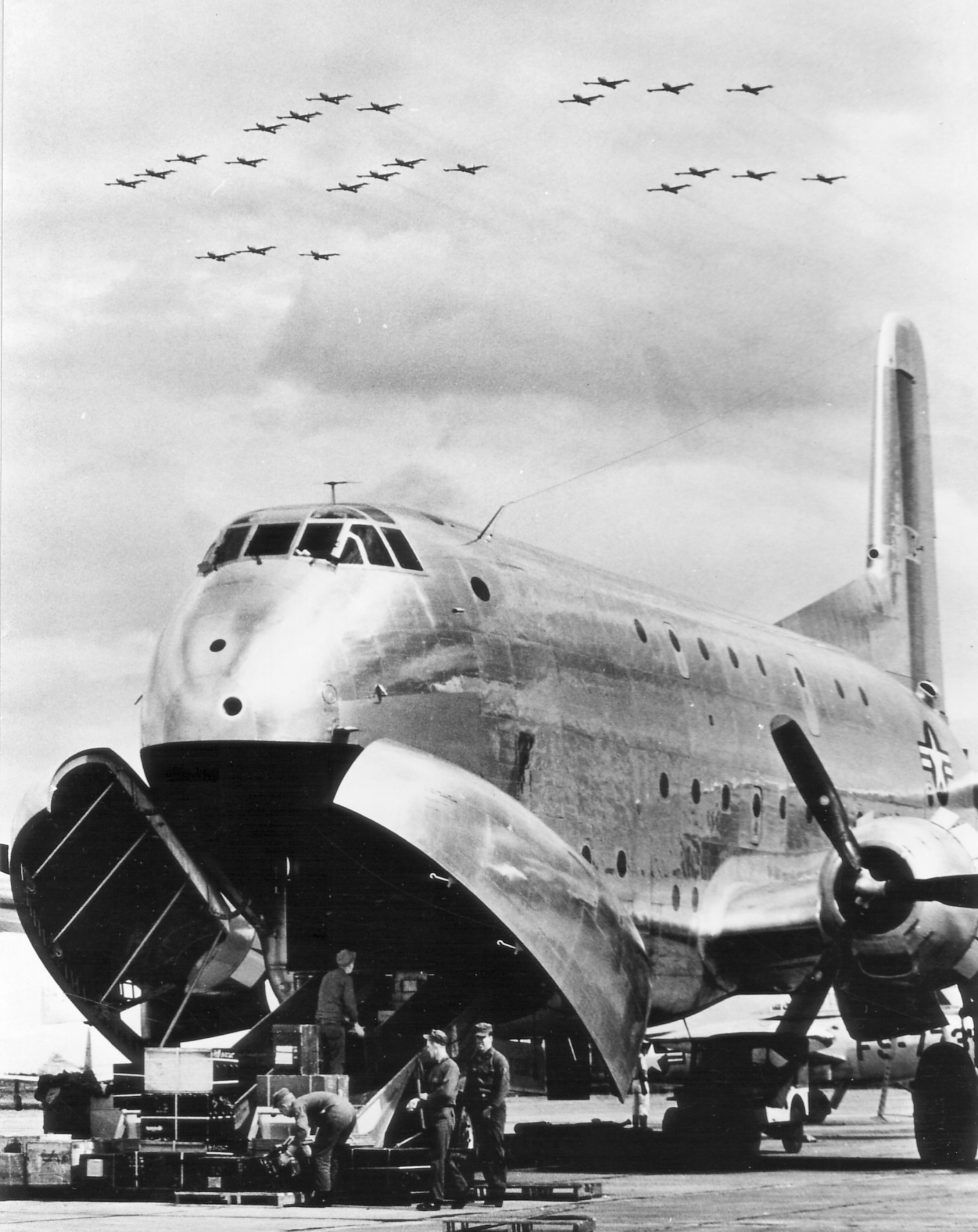
C-124 delivering F-84s to Japan, 1952

==== Transport units ====
- 1st Troop Carrier Group (Provisional) (C-46 Commando, C-47 Skytrain)

Temporary unit assembled from

46th Troop Carrier Squadron (P)
47th Troop Carrier Squadron (P)
48th Troop Carrier Squadron (P)

Stationed at: Ashiya AB, Japan, August 1950 – January 1951

- 61st Troop Carrier Group, Heavy (C-54 Skymaster)

Far East Air Force Combat Cargo Command, Provisional, 10 December 1950 – 1 January 1951)
1705 Air Transport Wing, 1 January 1951

Attached to: Far East Air Forces Combat Cargo Command, Provisional, 1–25 January 1951
Attached to: 315th Air Division, 25 January-1 October 1951

Eighteenth Air Force, 1 October 1951

Attached to: 315th Air Division, 1 October-5 November 1951
Attached to: 6122 Air Base Wing, 5 November 1951 – 26 March 1952
Attached to: 374th Troop Carrier Wing, 26 March-21 November 1952

Stationed at: Ashiya AB, Japan, 10 December 1950; Tachikawa AB, Japan, 26 March-15 November 1952

- 314th Troop Carrier Group, Medium (C-82/C-119 Flying Boxcar)

Attached to: Far East Air Forces [FEAF], 7–9 September 1950
Attached to: FEAF Combat Cargo Command, 10 September-30 November 1950
Attached to: 314th Air Division, 1 December 1950 – 25 January 1951
Attached to: 315th Air Division [Combat Cargo], 25 January 1951-c. 1 November 1952
Attached to: 483rd Troop Carrier Wing, 1 January 1953 – 15 November 1954.
Stationed at: Ashiya AB, Japan, 7 September 1950 – 15 November 1954

- 315th Troop Carrier Wing, Medium (C-46 Commando)

315th Air Division, 10 June 1952 – 18 January 1955.
Stationed at: Brady AB, Japan, 10 June 1952 – 18 January 1955

- 374th Troop Carrier Wing, Heavy (C-54 Skymaster)

Fifth Air Force, 5 March 1949

Attached to: 1 Troop Carrier Task Force [Provisional], 5–9 September 1950
Attached to: Far East Air Forces Combat Cargo Command, Provisional, 10 September 1950 – 1 December 1950

314th Air Division, 1 December 1950

Remained attached to Far East Air Forces Combat Cargo Command, Provisional, to 25 January 1951
315th Air Division (Combat Cargo), 25 January 1951 – 1 July 1957.

Stationed at: Tachikawa (later, Tachikawa AB), Japan, 5 March 1949 – 1 July 1957

- 403d Troop Carrier Wing, Medium (C-54 Skymaster, C-46 Commando)

Eighteenth Air Force, 1 June 1951 – 1 January 1953

Attached to 315th Air Division, 14 April 1952 – 1 January 1953

Stationed at: Ashiya AB, Japan, 14 April 1952 – 1 January 1953

- 1503rd Air Transport Wing, Heavy (C-118A Liftmaster)

Military Air Transport Service, June 1948
Stationed at: Haneda AB, Japan, 1946 – 1964

- 437th Troop Carrier Wing, Medium (C-46 Commando)

Fifth Air Force, 8 November 1950

Attached to FEAF Combat Cargo Command, Provisional, 8 November 1950 – 1 December 1950

314th Air Division, 1 December 1950

Remained attached to FEAF Combat Cargo Command, Provisional, through 24 January 1951

315th Air Division (Combat Cargo), 25 January 1951 – 10 June 1952
Stationed at: Brady Field, Japan, 8 November 1950 – 10 June 1952

- 483d Troop Carrier Wing, Medium (C-119 Flying Boxcar)

Tactical Air Command, 1 January 1953

Attached to 315th Air Division (Combat Cargo), 1 January 1953 – 30 June 1954

Stationed at: Ashiya AB, Japan, 1 January 1953 – 30 June 1954

Source for unit history:

61st Troop carrier Group

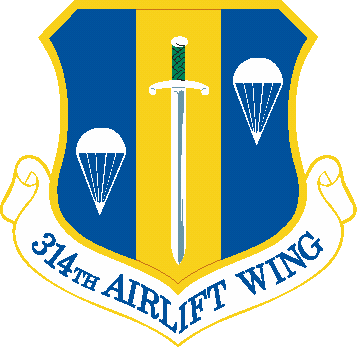
314th Troop Carrier Group

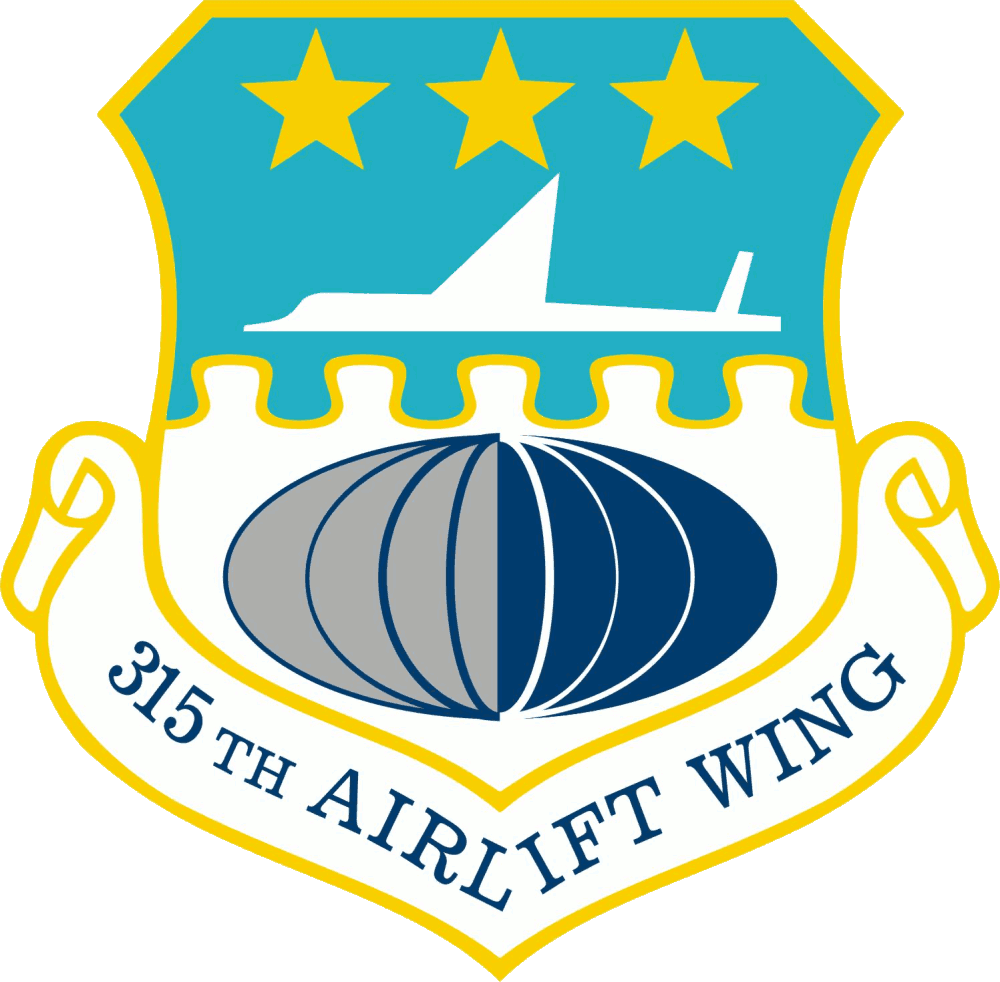
315th Troop Carrier Group

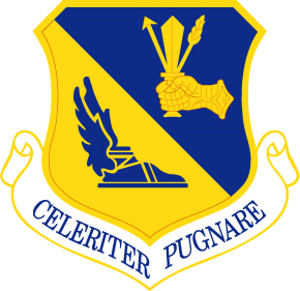
317th Troop Carrier Group

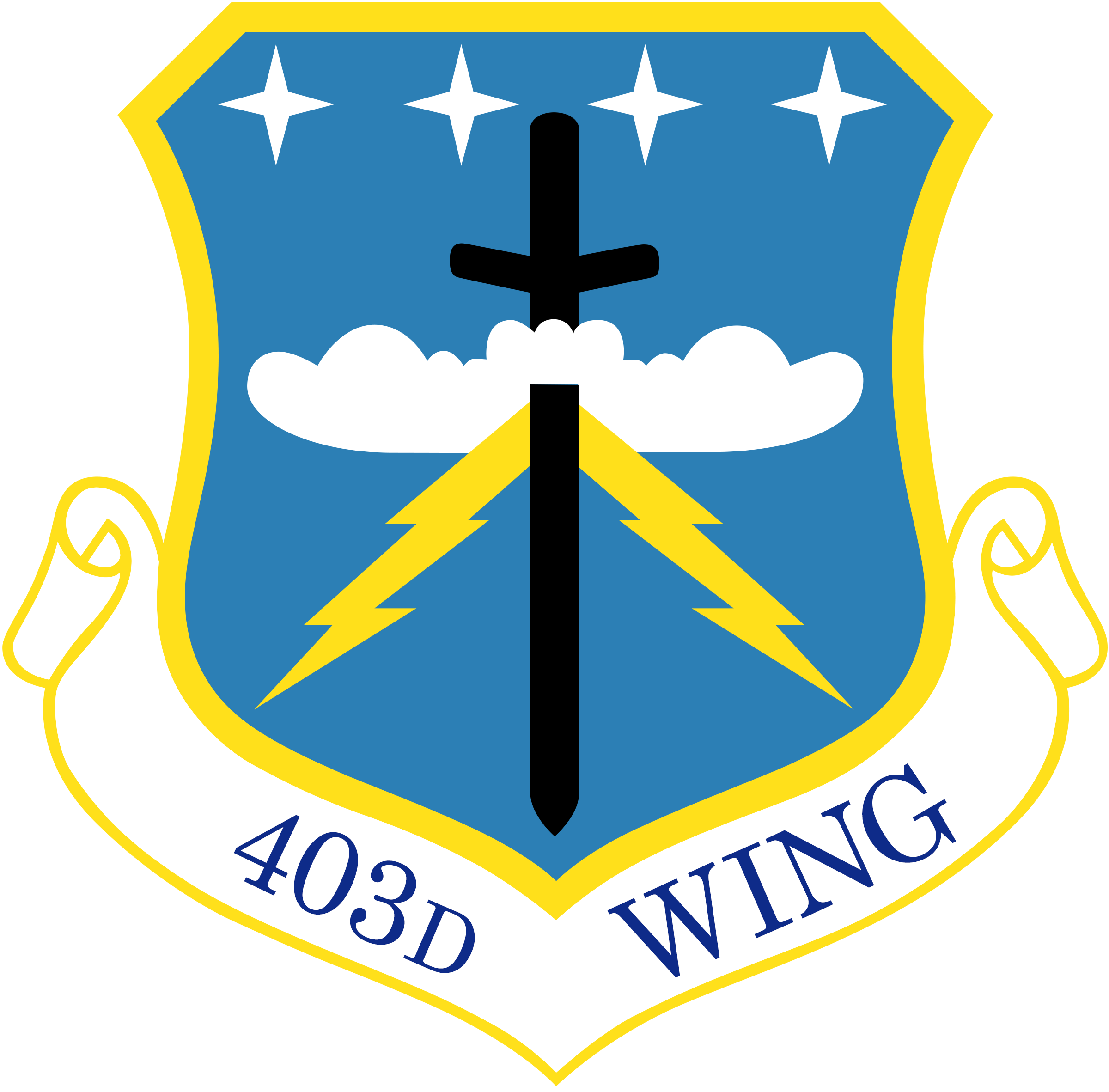
403d Troop Carrier Group

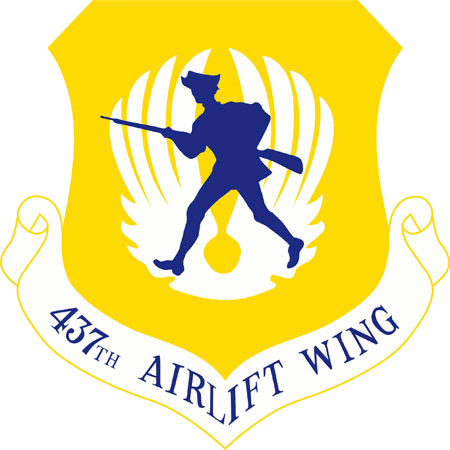
437th Troop Carrier Group

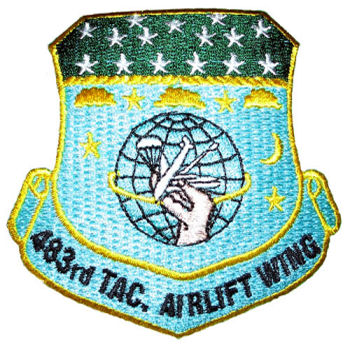
483rd Troop Carrier Wing, Medium

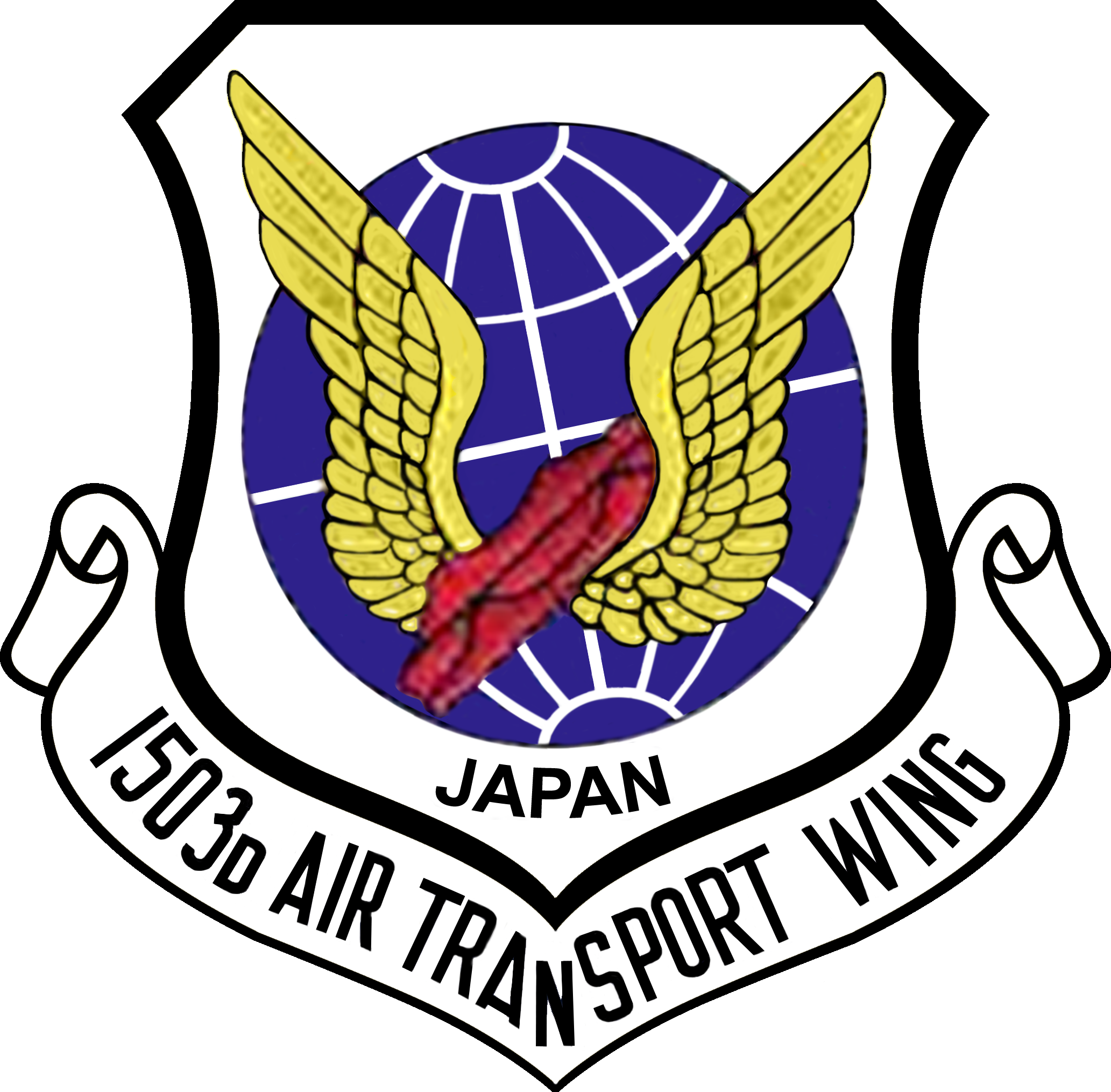
1503rd Air Transport Wing

=== Tactical air control units ===
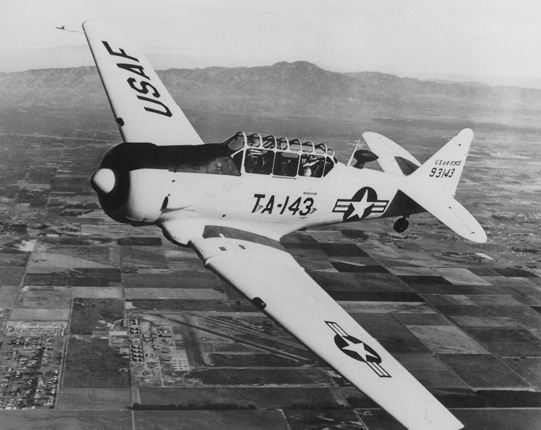
North American AT-6 Texan

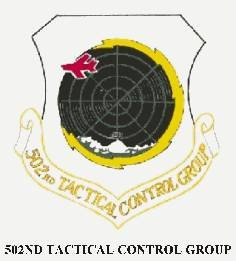
502nd Tactical Control Group

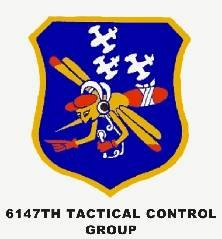
6147th Tactical Control Group

- North American AT-6 Texan
  The Texan trainer found a new life in Korea as a forward air control aircraft. To meet an urgent operational need for close air support of ground forces, the Texans flew "mosquito" missions, spotting enemy troops and guns and marking them with smoke rockets for USAF fighter attack. The T-6s of the 6147th Tactical Control Group performed invaluable work.

Units that flew the AT-6 in Korea were:

- 502nd Tactical Control Group

Temporary unit composed of:

605th Tactical Control Squadron: duration.
606th Aircraft Control and Warning Squadron: duration.
607th Aircraft Control and Warning Squadron: duration.
608th Aircraft Control and Warning Squadron: 2 November 1951–.
6132d Aircraft Control and Warning Squadron: 9 October 1950 – 2 November 1951.
1st Shoran Beacon Unit (later, Squadron): attached 27 September – 1 December 1950 and 6 September 1952–.

Stationed at: Pusan, South Korea, September – October 1950; Taegu, South Korea, October 1950; Seoul, South Korea, October 1950 – July 1953

- 6147th Tactical Control Group

Temporary unit composed of:

942nd Forward Air Control Squadron
6148th Tactical Control Squadron
6149th Tactical Control Squadron
6150th Tactical Control Squadron

Stationed at: Taegu AB, South Korea, August – October 1950; Kimpo AB, South Korea October 1950; Seoul Afld, South Korea, October 1950; Pyongyang East Adrm, North Korea, October – November 1950; Taegu AB, South Korea, November 1950 – March 1951; Pyongtaek Adrm, South Korea, March 1951 – April 1952; Chunchon, South Korea, April 1952 – July 1953

Source for unit history:

=== Other units ===
- 3rd Air Rescue Group
- 1st Shoran Beacon Squadron
- 5th Communications Group
- 10th Liaison Squadron
- 20th Weather Squadron Detachments
- 30th Weather Squadron
- 75th Air Depot Wing
- 417th Engineer Aviation Brigade
- 581st Air Resupply and Communications Wing
- 801st Medical Air Evacuation Squadron
- 3903rd Radar Bomb Scoring Group Detachments C (11), K (5), and N (22)
- 6004th Air Intelligence Service Squadron Detachments 1, 2, 3, and 5
- 6146th Air Force Advisory Group
- 6167th Air Base Group
- 6405th Korea Air Material Unit
- 6408th Far East Air Force (FEAF) Engineering & Services Squadron

Source for unit history:

=== Temporary tactical support wings ===
In July 1950 United States Department of Defense planners did not foresee that the Korean campaign would be of long duration. Consequently, the Fifth Air Force modified its command structure only to meet immediate needs. When the time came to move tactical air units to Korean airfields, Fifth Air Force did not deploy its permanent wings because they were heavily committed to the air defense of Japan. Instead, it utilized temporary air base squadrons and air base units to support tactical units in Korea. By August, the situation called for larger organizations with greater allotments of personnel and equipment, and Fifth Air Force set up five temporary tactical support wings to support the combat groups.

Formed to assist in the projection of force to Korea, these temporary wings provided facilities, administration, services, and operational control for assigned and attached combat units. The task was formidable, for the installations the wings controlled were usually "bare base" operations with no amenities and only marginally serviceable airfields.

Logistically, poor roads and rail lines, limited port facilities, and overextended airlift hampered the wings. Organizationally, they were without regular status, such as authorization for personnel and equipment or for promotions. Even with these handicaps and hardships, the tactical support wings performed valiantly. They worked hard to make combat airfields operable and to provide the support and control combat units needed. They struggled to keep pace with the dynamically changing battle lines, opening new bases and forward operating locations as needed.

Their success bought time for the Fifth Air Force to reorganize, and on 1 December 1950, regular wings replaced them.

- 6002d Tactical Support Wing
  Organized effective 1 August 1950, at Taegu #1 AB (K-2), to support the 18th Fighter-Bomber Group. Forced to withdraw with its tactical units to Ashiya AB, Japan, on 8 August, it returned to Korea on 5 September and advanced to Pyongyang on 22 November. It retreated to Suwon AB (K-13) on 30 November, where it was replaced on 1 December 1950, by the 18th Fighter-Bomber Wing.
- 6131st Tactical Support Wing
  Organized effective 8 August 1950, at Pohang AB (K-3), to support the 8th Fighter-Bomber Group, the wing moved to Suwon AB on 7 October and to Kimpo AB (K-14) on 28 October. On 25 November, it advanced to Pyongyang AB (K-23), where it was replaced by the 8th Fighter-Bomber Wing effective 1 December 1950.
- 6133d Tactical Support Wing
  This wing organized 12 August 1950 at Iwakuni AB, Japan, to support the 3d Bombardment Group and was replaced by the 3d Bombardment Wing on 1 December.
- 6149th Tactical Support Wing
  Organized 5 September 1950 at Taegu AB (K-2) to support the 49th Fighter-Bomber Group, this wing was replaced by the 49th Fighter-Bomber Wing effective 1 December.
- 6150th Tactical Support Wing
  Organized 5 September 1950 at Tsuiki AB, Japan, to support the 35th Fighter-Interceptor Group, the wing moved to Pohang AB (K-3) on 5 October and to Yonpo AB (K-27) on 27 November, where it was replaced by the 35th Fighter-Interceptor Wing on 1 December.

Source for unit history:

== Far East Air Force Korean airfields (K-sites) ==
During the Korean War, the large number of locations used for bases and the similarity of some geographical names prompted the Air Force to use alphanumeric identifiers for bases in addition to their proper designations. Under this system, each base in Korea received a "K number," simplifying positive identification when referring to the various bases.

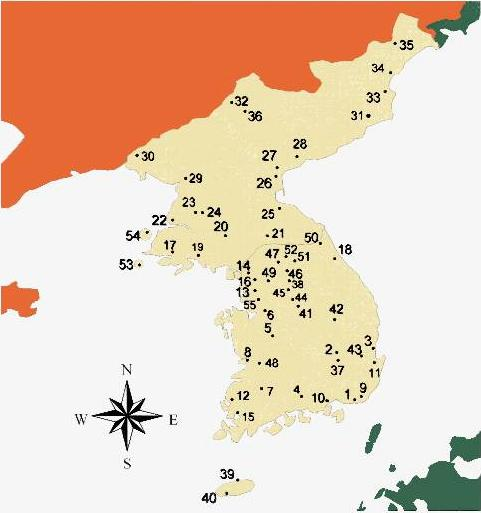
USAF airfields in Korea 1950–53.

These are the known bases that the U.S. Far East Air Forces operated during the Korean War. The place name spellings used are those found in Fifth Air Force general orders designating the K-Sites and other official Fifth Air Force documents.

- K-1 Pusan-West
- K-2 Taegu (Taegu #1)
- K-3 Pohang
- K-4 Sachon
- K-5 Taejon
- K-6 Pyongtaek
- K-7 Kwangju
- K-8 Kunsan
- K-9 Pusan-East
- K-10 Chinhae
- K-11 Urusan (Ulsan)
- K-12 Mangun
- K-13 Suwon
- K-14 Kimpo
- K-15 Mokpo
- K-16 Seoul
- K-17 Ongjin (Oshin)
- K-18 Kangnung (Koryo)
- K-19 Haeju (Kaishu)
- K-20 Sinmak
- K-21 Pyonggang
- K-22 Onjong-ni
- K-23 Pyongyang
- K-24 Pyongyang East
- K-25 Wonsan
- K-26 Sondok
- K-27 Yonpo
- K-28 Hamhung West
- K-29 Sinanju
- K-30 Sinuiju
- K-31 Kilchu (Kisshu)
- K-32 Oesichon-dong
- K-33 Hoemun (Kaibun)
- K-34 Chongjin (Seishin)
- K-35 Hoeryong (Kainsei)
- K-36 Kanggye
- K-37 Taegu No. 2
- K-38 Wonju AB
- K-39 Cheju-do No. 1
- K-40 Cheju-do No. 2
- K-41 Chungju
- K-42 Andong No. 2
- K-43 Kyongju
- K-44 Changhowon-ni
- K-45 Yoju
- K-46 Hoengsong
- K-47 Chunchon
- K-48 Iri
- K-49 Yangsu-ri
- K-50 Sokcho-ri
- K-51 Inje
- K-52 Yanggu
- K-53 Paengyong-do
- K-54 Cho-do
- K-55 Osan-ni
- K-57 Kwangju
