= 6204th Photo Mapping Flight =

The 6204th Photo Mapping Flight was a United States Air Force unit that fought in the Korean War. The unit was attached to Far East Air Forces Fifth Air Force

In mid-July 1950, the 6204th Photo Mapping Flight, located at Clark AB, Philippines, deployed the Flight's two RB-17 aircraft complete with combat crews and maintenance personnel to Johnson AB, Japan. The FEAF deployment order specified that the two RB-17 aircraft be equipped with normal armament insofar as practicable, so as not to interfere with the photographic capability of the aircraft. This posed a problem for the Flight since the RB-17s had been flying peacetime missions and were not equipped for combat. However, the 6204th found the necessary gunners and equipment, made the modifications to the aircraft, and by late August 1950 the detachment began flying photo-mapping missions over Korea. By the end of November 1950, it had photographed the entire North Korean area at least once and re-photographed some areas as far north as weather conditions permitted. By early December the detachment returned to Clark AB and resumed the flight's mapping program in the Philippine area.

Stations:

- Johnson AB, Japan (July - November 1950)

Aircraft Flown:

- Boeing RB-17G Flying Fortress

== See also ==
- Pacific Air Forces
- Fifth Air Force
- USAF Organizations in the Korean War
