= Ongjin Airport =

- IATA: none; ICAO: none

Summary
- Airport type: Military
- Serves: Ongjin, North Korea
- Elevation AMSL: 167 ft / 51 m
- Coordinates: 37°55′51.70″N 125°24′54.30″E
- Interactive map of Ongjin Airport

Runways
Direction	Length		Surface
Direction	ft	m	Surface
11/29	6,650	2,027	Grass

Ongjin Airport(옹진비행장) is an airport in Ongjin, Hwanghae-namdo, North Korea.

== Facilities ==
The airfield has a single grass runway 11/29 measuring 6650 x 164 feet (2027 x 50 m). It is sited on the west coast of North Korea along the Korea Bay.

== History ==
During the UN occupation of North Korea in the Korean War, it saw some use under the designation K-17; however its coastal location may have made it unsuitable for regular use. In 1971, some reconstruction activity occurred, but the airfield has still remained largely inactive.
