= Timeline of the North Korean nuclear program =

Chronology of the North Korean nuclear program

Location of North Korea's nuclear tests
1: 2006; 2: 2009; 3: 2013; 4: 2016-01; 5: 2016-09; 6: 2017;
V

This chronology of the North Korean nuclear program has its roots in the 1950s and begins in earnest in 1989 with the end of the Cold War and the collapse of the Soviet Union, the main economic ally of North Korea. The chronology mainly addresses the conflict between the United States and North Korea, while including the influences of the other members of the six-party talks: China, Russia, South Korea, and Japan.

The North Korean nuclear program can roughly be divided into four phases. Phase I (1956–1980) dealt primarily with training and gaining basic knowledge. Phase II (1980–1994) covers the growth and eventual suspension of North Korea's domestic plutonium production program. Phase III (1994–2002) covers the period of the "freeze" on North Korea's plutonium program (though North Korea pursued uranium enrichment in secret), and phase IV (2002–present) covers the current period of renewed nuclear activities.

== Nuclear weapons types ==
Nuclear weapon warhead designs fall into various categories.

- Fission devices (commonly called "atom bombs" or "A-bombs") rely on nuclear fission, the splitting of extremely heavy elements to release energy. The bombs used against Japan in World War 2 were of this type.
- At the other end of the scale, staged thermonuclear weapons (commonly called "hydrogen bombs" or "H-bombs") use one or more fission devices just as a first stage, to ignite a fusion warhead, in which extremely light elements fuse together releasing a great deal of energy. The most massive bombs exploded are of this kind and can be up to thousands of times more powerful than those used during World War 2. (All multi-megaton modern thermonuclear weapons are of this type)
- Finally, between the two are a variety of hybrids, such as "boosted" designs where a fission device is surrounded by (or contains) fusible material to boost its yield, and "fission–fusion–fission" devices. These can add anything from a moderate to a significant increase to a fission device.

Compared to fission weapons, thermonuclear designs are exceedingly complex, and staged weapons in particular are so complex that only five countries (USA, Russia, France, UK, China) have created them in more than 70 years of research. The fuels for an H-bomb are also far more difficult to create. Several countries with long-standing nuclear weapons programs, such as India and Pakistan, are suspected of striving towards a hybrid or "boosted" design instead, which is easier. Since both fusion weapons and hybrid designs can at times be referred to as "hydrogen bombs", it cannot be said with certainty at present, what type of weapon North Korea may have been referring to in any given test. At present, analysts are skeptical of the 2016 test being a staged thermonuclear design, while noting that the most recent test, in 2017, was considerably more powerful. In 2018, North Korea had offered and was reportedly preparing for inspections at nuclear and missile sites.

== Phase I ==
- 1956: The Soviet Union begins training North Korean scientists and engineers, giving them "basic knowledge" to initiate a nuclear program.
- 1958: The U.S. deploys nuclear armed Honest John missiles and 280 mm atomic cannons to South Korea.
- 1959: North Korea and the USSR sign a nuclear cooperation agreement.
- 1962: The Yongbyon Nuclear Scientific Research Center opens.
- 1965: The Yongbyon IRT-2000 research reactor reaches a power rating of 2 MW.
- 1974: The Yongbyon IRT-2000 research reactor reaches a power rating of 4 MW.
- Between the late 1970s and early 1980s North Korea begins uranium mining operations at various locations near Sunchon and Pyongsan.

== Phase II ==
- 1980–1985: North Korea builds a factory at Yongbyon to refine yellowcake and produce fuel for reactors.
- 1984: The DPRK completes construction of a "Radiochemical laboratory", which is actually a reprocessing plant used to separate plutonium from spent nuclear fuel at the Yongbyon site.
- 1984–1986: North Korea completes construction on a 5 MWe gas-cooled, graphite-moderated nuclear reactor for plutonium production. North Korea also commences with the construction of a second 50 MWe nuclear reactor.
- 1987: The Yongbyon IRT-2000 research reactor reaches a power rating of 8 MW.
- 1989: Soviet control of communist governments throughout Europe begins to weaken, and the Cold War comes to a close. Post-Soviet states emerge in Eastern Europe and Central Asia. As the USSR's power declines, North Korea loses the security guarantees and economic support that had sustained it for 45 years.
- Through satellite photos, the U.S. learns of new construction at a nuclear complex near the North Korean town of Yongbyon. U.S. intelligence analysts suspect that North Korea, which had signed the Nuclear Non-Proliferation Treaty (NPT) in 1985 but had not yet allowed inspections of its nuclear facilities, is in the early stages of building a nuclear bomb.
- In response, the U.S. pursues a strategy in which North Korea's full compliance with the NPT would lead to progress on other diplomatic issues, such as the normalization of relations.
- December 1990: North Korea conducts 70–80 high-explosives tests at its Yongbyon facility.
- 1991: The U.S. withdrew its last nuclear weapons from South Korea in December 1991, though U.S. affirmation of this action was not clear, resulting in rumors persisting that nuclear weapons remained in South Korea. The U.S. had deployed nuclear weapons in South Korea since January 1958, peaking in number at about 950 warheads in 1967.
- 1992: In May, for the first time, North Korea allows a team from the International Atomic Energy Agency (IAEA). The Agency inspection finds inconsistencies with North Korea declarations. Hans Blix, head of the IAEA, and the U.S. suspect that North Korea is secretly using its five-megawatt reactor and reprocessing facility at Yongbyon to turn spent fuel into weapons-grade plutonium. Before leaving, Blix arranges for fully equipped inspection teams to follow.
- The inspections do not go well. Over the next several months, the North Koreans repeatedly block inspectors from visiting two of Yongbyon's suspected nuclear waste sites, and IAEA inspectors find evidence that the country is not revealing the full extent of its plutonium production.
- 1993: In March, North Korea threatens to withdraw from the NPT. Facing heavy domestic pressure from Republicans who oppose negotiations with North Korea, President Bill Clinton appoints Robert Gallucci to start a new round of negotiations. After 89 days, North Korea announces it has suspended its withdrawal. (The NPT requires three months notice before a country can withdraw.)
- In December, IAEA Director-General Blix announces that the agency can no longer provide "any meaningful assurances" that North Korea is not producing nuclear weapons.
- 12 October 1994: the United States and North Korea signed the "Agreed Framework": North Korea agreed to freeze its plutonium production program in exchange for fuel oil, economic cooperation, and the construction of two modern light-water nuclear power plants. Eventually, North Korea's existing nuclear facilities were to be dismantled, and the spent reactor fuel taken out of the country.
- 26 October 1994: IAEA Chairman Hans Blix tells the British House of Commons' Foreign Affairs Select Committee the IAEA is "not very happy" with the Agreed Framework because it gives North Korea too much time to begin complying with the inspections regime.

== Phase III ==
- 18 March 1996: Hans Blix tells the IAEA's Board of Governors North Korea has still not made its initial declaration of the amount of plutonium they possess, as required under the Agreed Framework, and warned that without the declaration IAEA would lose the ability to verify North Korea was not using its plutonium to develop weapons.
- October 1997: spent nuclear fuel rods were encased in steel containers, under IAEA inspection.
- 31 August 1998: North Korea launched a Paektusan-1 space launch vehicle in a launch attempt of its Kwangmyŏngsŏng-1 satellite. U.S. military analysts suspect satellite launch is a ruse for the testing of an ICBM. This missile flew over Japan causing the Japanese government to retract 1 billion in aid for two civilian light-water reactors.

=== 2002 ===
- Early in the year construction of a suspected uranium enrichment facility at the Kangson enrichment site started.
- 29 January: U.S. President George W. Bush in his State of the Union Address named North Korea as part of the axis of evil, aiming to threaten the peace of the world and posing a grave danger.
- 7 August: "First Concrete" pouring at the construction site of the light-water nuclear power plants being built by the Korean Peninsula Energy Development Organization under the 1994 Agreed Framework. Construction of both reactors was many years behind the agreement's target completion date of 2003.
- 17 September: Japanese Prime Minister Junichiro Koizumi becomes the first Japanese prime minister to visit Pyongyang, making a number of political and cooperative offers.
- 3–5 October: On a visit to the North Korean capital Pyongyang, US Assistant Secretary of State James Kelly presses the North on suspicions that it is continuing to pursue a nuclear energy and missiles programme. Mr Kelly says he has evidence of a secret uranium-enriching program carried out in defiance of the 1994 Agreed Framework. Under this deal, North Korea agreed to forsake nuclear ambitions in return for the construction of two safer light water nuclear power reactors and oil shipments from the US.
- 16 October: The US announces that North Korea admitted in their talks to a "clandestine nuclear-weapons" program.
- 17 October: Initially the North appears conciliatory. Leader Kim Jong-il says he will allow international weapons inspectors to check that nuclear facilities are out of use.
- 20 October: North-South Korea talks in Pyongyang are undermined by the North's nuclear program "admission". US Secretary of State Colin Powell says further US aid to North Korea is now in doubt. The North adopts a mercurial stance, at one moment defiantly defending its "right" to weapons development and at the next offering to halt nuclear program in return for aid and the signing of a non-aggression pact with the US. It argues that the US has not kept to its side of the Agreed Framework, as the construction of the light water reactors—due to be completed in 2003—is now years behind schedule.
- 14 November: US President George W Bush declares November oil shipments to the North will be the last if the North does not agree to put a halt to its weapons ambitions.
- 18 November: Confusion clouds a statement by North Korea in which it initially appears to acknowledge having nuclear weapons. A key Korean phrase understood to mean the North does have nuclear weapons could have been mistaken for the phrase "entitled to have", Seoul says.
- 27 November: The North accuses the US of deliberately misinterpreting its contested statement, twisting an assertion of its "right" to possess weapons into an "admission" of possession.
- December: South Korean presidential election. The Grand National Party, who opposed the Sunshine Policy which was conceived in 1998, made much of the North Korean situation, although it eventually lost the election.
- 4 December: The North rejects a call to open its nuclear facilities to inspection.
- 11 December: North Korean-made Scud missiles are found aboard a ship bound for Yemen. The US illegally detains the ship, but is later forced to allow the ship to go, conceding that neither country has broken any law.
- 12 December: The North pledges to reactivate nuclear facilities for energy generation, saying the Americans' decision to halt oil shipments leaves it with no choice. It claims the US wrecked the 1994 pact.
- 13 December: North Korea asks the UN's International Atomic Energy Agency (IAEA) to remove seals and surveillance equipment – the IAEA's "eyes and ears" on the North's nuclear status—from its Yongbyon power plant.
- 22 December: The North begins removing monitoring devices from the Yongbyon plant.
- 24 December: North Korea begins repairs at the Yongbyon plant. North-South Korea talks over reopening road and rail border links, which have been struggling on despite the increased tension, finally stall.
- 25 December: It emerges that North Korea had begun shipping fuel rods to the Yongbyon plant which could be used to produce plutonium.
- 26 December: The IAEA expresses concern in the light of UN confirmation that 1,000 fuel rods have been moved to the Yongbyon reactor.
- 27 December: North Korea says it is expelling the two IAEA nuclear inspectors from the country. It also says it is planning to reopen a reprocessing plant, which could start producing weapons grade plutonium within months.

== Phase IV ==
=== 2003 ===
- Construction of a suspected uranium enrichment facility at the Kangson enrichment site was completed.
- 2 January: South Korea asks China to use its influence with North Korea to try to reduce tension over the nuclear issue, and two days later Russia offers to press Pyongyang to abandon its nuclear programme.
- 6 January: The IAEA passes a resolution demanding that North Korea readmit UN inspectors and abandon its secret nuclear weapons programme "within weeks", or face possible action by the UN Security Council.
- 7 January: The US says it is "willing to talk to North Korea about how it meets its obligations to the international community". But it "will not provide quid pro quos to North Korea to live up to its existing obligations".
- 9 January: North Korea sends diplomats to meet with New Mexico governor Bill Richardson about the nuclear crisis; North Korea also agrees to hold cabinet-level talks with South Korea on 21 January.
- 10 January: North Korea announces it will withdraw from the Nuclear Non-Proliferation Treaty.
- 20 January: US Secretary of State Colin Powell calls on the IAEA to refer the North Korean nuclear issue to the United Nations Security Council for resolution.
- 21 January: Diplomatic talks commence between cabinet-level officials from both North Korea and South Korea; the North is represented by Kim Ryong Song.
- 24 January: Cabinet-level talks between North and South Korea end without making progress. South Korean President-elect Roh Moo-hyun proposes face-to-face meeting with Kim Jong-il.
- 28 January: In his annual State of the Union address, President Bush alleges North Korea is "an oppressive regime [whose] people live in fear and starvation". He accuses North Korea of deception over its nuclear ambitions and says "America and the world will not be blackmailed".
- 29 January: North Korea says President Bush's speech is an "undisguised declaration of aggression to topple the DPRK system" and dubs him a "shameless charlatan". At the same time, however, it reiterates its demand for bilateral talks on a non-aggression pact.
- 31 January: Unnamed American officials are quoted as saying that spy satellites have tracked movement at the Yongbyon plant throughout January, prompting fears that North Korea is trying to reprocess plutonium for nuclear bombs.
- White House spokesman Ari Fleischer delivers a stern warning that North Korea must not take "yet another provocative action... intended to intimidate and blackmail the international community".
- 4 February: The United States says it is considering new military deployments in the Pacific Ocean to back up its forces in South Korea, as a deterrent against any North Korean aggression that might arise in the event that the US initiated a new military campaign in Iraq.
- 5 February: North Korea says it has reactivated its nuclear facilities and their operations are now going ahead "on a normal footing".
- 6 February: North Korea warns the United States that any decision to build up its troops in the region could lead the North to make a pre-emptive attack on American forces.
- 12 February: The IAEA finds North Korea in breach of nuclear safeguards and refers the matter to the UN security council.
- 16 February: Kim Jong-il celebrates his 61st birthday, but state media warns North Korean citizens to be on "high alert".
- 17 February: The US and South Korea announce that they will hold joint military exercises in March.
- 24 February: North Korea fires a missile into the sea between South Korea and Japan.
- 25 February: Roh Moo-hyun sworn in as South Korean president.
- 2 March: Four North Korean fighter jets intercept a US reconnaissance plane in international air space and shadow it for 22 minutes.
- 10 March: North Korea fires a second missile into the sea between South Korea and Japan in as many weeks.
- 22 March: As a blistering bombing campaign pounds the Iraqi capital, and South Korean and US forces perform military exercises on its doorstep, a jumpy North denounces their "confrontational posture" and calls off talks with the South.
- 1 April: The US announces that "stealth" fighters sent to South Korea for a training exercise are to stay on once the exercises end.
- 7 April: Ministerial talks between North and South Korea are canceled after Pyongyang fails to confirm they would take place.
- 9 April: The United Nations Security Council expresses concern about North Korea's nuclear programme, but fails to condemn Pyongyang for pulling out of the Nuclear Non-proliferation Treaty.
- 12 April: In a surprise move, North Korea signals it may be ready to end its insistence on direct talks with the US, announcing that "if the US is ready to make a bold switchover in its Korea policy for a settlement of the nuclear issue, [North Korea] will not stick to any particular dialogue format".
- 18 April: North Korea announces that it has started reprocessing its spent fuel rods. The statement is later amended to read that Pyongyang has been "successfully going forward to reprocess" the rods.
- 23 April: Talks begin in Beijing between the US and North Korea, hosted by China. The talks are led by the US Assistant Secretary of State for East Asian affairs, James Kelly, and the deputy director general of North Korea's American Affairs Bureau, Li Gun.
- 24 April: American officials say Pyongyang has told them that it now has nuclear weapons, after the first direct talks for months between the US and North Korea in Beijing end a day early.
- 25 April: Talks end amid mutual recrimination, after the US says North Korea had made its first admission that it possessed nuclear weapons.
- 28 April: US Secretary of State Colin Powell says North Korea made an offer to US officials, during the talks in Beijing, to scrap its nuclear programme in exchange for major concessions from the United States. He does not specify what those concessions are, but reports say that Pyongyang wants normalized relations with the US and economic assistance. Mr Powell says Washington is studying the offer.
- 5 May: North Korea demands the US respond to what it terms the "bold proposal" it made during the Beijing talks.
- 12 May: North Korea says it is scrapping a 1992 agreement with the South to keep the peninsula free from nuclear weapons – Pyongyang's last remaining international agreement on non-proliferation.
- 15 May: South Korean President Roh Moo-hyun meets US President George W Bush in Washington for talks on how to handle North Korea's nuclear ambitions.
- 2 June: A visiting delegation of US congressmen led by Curt Weldon says North Korean officials admitted the country had nuclear weapons and had "just about completed" reprocessing 8,000 spent fuel rods which would allow it to build more.
- 9 June: North Korea says publicly that it will build a nuclear deterrent, "unless the US gives up its hostile policy".
- 13 June: South Korea's Yonhap News Agency says North Korean officials told the US on 30 June that it had completed reprocessing the fuel rods.
- 18 June: North Korea says it will "put further spurs to increasing its nuclear deterrent force for self-defence".
- 9 July: South Korea's spy agency says North Korea has started reprocessing a "small number" of the 8,000 spent nuclear fuel rods at Yongbyon.
- 1 August: North Korea agrees to six-way talks on its nuclear programme, South Korea confirms. The US, Japan, China and Russia will also be involved.
- 27–29 August: Six-nation talks in Beijing on North Korea's nuclear programme. The meeting fails to bridge the gap between Washington and Pyongyang. Delegates agree to meet again.
- 2 October: North Korea announces publicly it has reprocessed the spent fuel rods.
- 16 October: North Korea says it will "physically display" its nuclear deterrent.
- 30 October: North Korea agrees to resume talks on the nuclear crisis, after saying it is prepared to consider the US offer of a security guarantee in return for ending its nuclear programme.
- 21 November: Kedo, the international consortium formed to build 'tamper-proof' nuclear power plants in North Korea, decides to suspend the project.
- 9 December: North Korea offers to "freeze" its nuclear programme in return for a list of concessions from the US. It says that unless Washington agrees, it will not take part in further talks. The US rejects North Korea's offer. President George W Bush says Pyongyang must dismantle the programme altogether.
- 27 December: North Korea says it will take part in a new round of six-party talks on its nuclear programme in early 2004.

=== 2004 ===
- 2 January: South Korea confirms that the North has agreed to allow a group of US experts, including a top nuclear scientist, visit Yongbyon nuclear facility.
- 10 January: The unofficial US team visits the North's "nuclear deterrent" facility at Yongbyon.
- 22 January: US nuclear scientist Siegfried Hecker tells Congress that the delegates visiting Yongbyon were shown what appeared to be weapons-grade plutonium, but he did not see any evidence of a nuclear bomb.
- 3 February: North Korea reports that the next round of six-party talks on the nuclear crisis will be held on 25 February.
- 25 February: Second round of six nation talks end without breakthrough in Beijing.
- 23 May: The UN atomic agency is reported to be investigating allegations that North Korea secretly sent uranium to Libya when Tripoli was trying to develop nuclear weapons.
- 23 June: Third round of six nation talks held in Beijing, with the US making a new offer to allow North Korea fuel aid if it freezes then dismantles its nuclear programmes.
- 2 July: US Secretary of State Colin Powell meets the North Korean Foreign Minister, Paek Nam-sun, in the highest-level talks between the two countries since the crisis erupted.
- 24 July: North Korea rejects US suggestions that it follow Libya's lead and give up its nuclear ambitions, calling the US proposal a daydream.
- 3 August: North Korea is in the process of developing a new missile system for ships or submarines, according to a report in Jane's Defence Weekly.
- 23 August: North Korea describes US President George W Bush as an "imbecile" and a "tyrant that puts Hitler in the shade", in response to comments President Bush made describing the North's Kim Jong-il as a "tyrant".
- 12 September: Clinton Former Secretary of State Madeleine Albright admits North Korean "cheating" on the Agreed Framework occurred during the "Clinton Watch."Transcript for September 12
- 28 September: North Korea says it has turned plutonium from 8,000 spent fuel rods into nuclear weapons. Speaking at the UN General Assembly, Vice Foreign Minister Choe Su-hon said the weapons were needed for "self-defence" against "US nuclear threat".

=== 2005 ===
- 14 January: North Korea says it is willing to restart stalled talks on its nuclear programme, according to the official KCNA news agency. The statement says North Korea "would not stand against the US but respect and treat it as a friend unless the latter slanders the former's system and interferes in its internal affairs".
- 19 January: Condoleezza Rice, President George W Bush's nominee as secretary of state, identifies North Korea as one of six "outposts of tyranny" where the US must help bring freedom.
- 10 February: North Korea says it is suspending its participation in the talks over its nuclear programme for an "indefinite period", blaming the Bush administration's intention to "antagonise, isolate and stifle it at any cost". The statement also repeats North Korea's assertion to have built nuclear weapons for self-defence.
- 18 April: South Korea says North Korea has shut down its Yongbyon reactor, a move which could allow it to extract more fuel for nuclear weapons.
- 1 May: North Korea fires a short-range missile into the Sea of Japan (East Sea of Korea), on the eve of a meeting of members of the international Non-Proliferation Treaty.
- 11 May: North Korea says it has completed extraction of spent fuel rods from Yongbyon, as part of plans to "increase its nuclear arsenal".
- 16 May: North and South Korea hold their first talks in 10 months, with the North seeking fertilizer for its troubled agriculture sector.
- 25 May: The US suspends efforts to recover the remains of missing US servicemen in North Korea, saying restrictions placed on its work were too great.
- 7 June: China's envoy to the UN says he expects North Korea to rejoin the six-nation talks "in the next few weeks".
- 22 June: North Korea requests more food aid from the South during ministerial talks in Seoul, the first for a year.
- 9 July: North Korea says it will rejoin nuclear talks, as US Secretary of State Condoleezza Rice begins a tour of the region.
- 12 July: South Korea offers the North huge amounts of electricity as an incentive to end its nuclear weapons programme.
- 25 July: Fourth round of six-nation talks begins in Beijing.
- 7 August: The talks reach deadlock and a recess is called.
- 13 September: Talks resume. North Korea requests the building of the light-water reactors promised in the Agreed Framework, but the U.S. refuses, prompting warnings of a "standoff" between the parties.
- 19 September: In what is initially hailed as an historic joint statement, North Korea agrees to give up all its nuclear activities and rejoin the nuclear Non-Proliferation Treaty, while the US says it had no intention of attacking.
- 20 September: North Korea says it will not scrap its nuclear programme until it is given a civilian nuclear reactor, undermining the joint statement and throwing further talks into doubt.
- 7 December: A senior US diplomat brands North Korea a "criminal regime" involved in arms sales, drug trafficking and currency forgery.
- 20 December: North Korea says it intends to resume building nuclear reactors, because the US had pulled out of a key deal to build it two new reactors.

=== 2006 ===
- 12 April: A two-day meeting aimed at persuading North Korea to return to talks on its nuclear program fails to resolve the deadlock.
- 26 June: A report by the Institute for Science and International Security estimates that current North Korea plutonium stockpiles is sufficient for four to thirteen nuclear weapons.
- 3 July: Washington dismisses a threat by North Korea that it will launch a nuclear strike against the US in the event of an American attack, as a White House spokesman described the threat as "deeply hypothetical".
- 4 July: North Korea test-fires at least six missiles, including a long-range Taepodong-2, despite repeated warnings from the international community.
- 5 July: North Korea test-fires a seventh missile, despite international condemnation of its earlier launches.
- 6 July: North Korea announces it would continue to launch missiles, as well as "stronger steps", if other countries were to apply additional pressure as a result of the latest missile launches, claiming it to be their sovereign right to carry out these tests. A US television network also reports that they have quoted intelligence sources in saying that North Korea is readying another Taepodong-2 long-range missile for launch.
- 3 October: North Korea announces plans to test a nuclear weapon in the future, blaming "hostile US policy". Their full text can be read at BBC News.
- 5 October: A US envoy directly threatens North Korea as to the upcoming test, stating "It (North Korea) can have a future or it can have these (nuclear) weapons, it cannot have them both." The envoy also mentions that any attempt to test a nuclear device would be seen as a "highly provocative act".
- 6 October: The United Nations Security Council issues a statement declaring, "The Security Council urges the DPRK not to undertake such a test and to refrain from any action that might aggravate tension, to work on the resolution of non-proliferation concerns and to facilitate a peaceful and comprehensive solution through political and diplomatic efforts. Later in the day, there are unconfirmed reports of the North Korean government successfully testing a nuclear bomb."
- 9 October: North Korea announces that it has performed its first-ever nuclear weapon test. The country's official Korean Central News Agency said the test was performed successfully, and there was no radioactive leakage from the site. South Korea's Yonhap news agency said the test was conducted at 10:36 a.m. (01:36 GMT) in Hwaderi near Kilju city, citing defense officials. The USGS detected an earthquake with a preliminary estimated magnitude of 4.2 at 41.311°N, 129.114°E . The USGS coordinate indicates that the location in much north of Hwaderi, near the upper stream of Oran-chon, 17 km NNW of Punggye-Yok, according to analysts reports. In an interview on The Daily Show with Jon Stewart, former Secretary of State James Baker let it slip that North Korea “... had a rudimentary nuclear weapon way back in the days when I was Secretary of State, but now this is a more advanced one evidently.” He was Secretary of State between 1989 and 1992.
- 10 October: Some western scientists had doubts as to whether the nuclear weapon test that took place on 9 October 2006 was in fact successful. The scientists cite that the measurements recorded only showed an explosion equivalent to 500 metric tons of TNT, as compared to the 1998 nuclear tests that India and Pakistan conducted which were 24–50 times more powerful. This could indicate that the test resulted in a fizzle. Some also speculated that the test may be a ruse using conventional explosives and nuclear material.
- 14 October: The United Nations Security Council passed U.N. Resolution 1718, imposing sanctions on North Korea for its announced nuclear test on 9 October 2006 that include largely symbolic steps to hit the North Korea's nuclear and missile programs, a reiteration of financial sanctions that were already in place, as well as keeping luxury goods away from its leaders, for example French wines and spirits or jet skis. However, the sanctions do not have the full support of China and Russia. The resolution was pushed in large part by the administration of George W. Bush, whose party at the time was engaged in an important mid-term election.
- 27 October: Japanese Chief Cabinet Secretary Yasuhisa Shiozaki, based upon U.S. intelligence, announces, "We reached the conclusion that the probability that North Korea conducted a nuclear test is extremely high." He continued on to admit that Japanese aircraft could not confirm the U.S. and South Korean reports.
- 18 December: The six-party talks resume in what is known as the fifth round, second phase. After a week of negotiations, the parties managed to reaffirm the 19 September declaration, as well as reiterate their parties' stances. For more information, see six-party talks.

=== 2007 ===
- 13 January: North Korean official Song Il-ho was reported to have told his Japanese counterpart Taku Yamasaki that whether the North Koreans conduct a second nuclear test depends on "US actions in the future".
- 16 January: In-between-round talks between North Korea and the US are held in Berlin, Germany. Certain areas of agreement have been reached, as confirmed by both sides. North Korea claims these were bilateral negotiations; the US claims these "set the groundwork for the next round of six-party talks".
- 26 January: On 26 January 2007, Russian chief negotiator Alexander Losyukov told reporters that the third phase was most likely to take place in late January or early February 2007, most likely 5–8 February 2007, before the Lunar New Year.
- 10 February: Reports emanating from Washington suggest that the CIA reports in 2002 that North Korea was developing uranium enrichment technology overstated or misread the intelligence. U.S. officials are no longer making this a major issue in the six-party talks.
- 13 February: The fifth round of the six-party talks conclude with an agreement. Pyongyang promises to shut down the Yongbyon reactor in exchange for 50,000 metric tons of fuel aid, with more to follow upon verification that the site has been permanently disabled. IAEA inspectors will be re-admitted, and the United States will begin the process of normalizing relations with North Korea.
- 19 March: The sixth round of six-party talks commences in Beijing.
- 25 June: North Korea announces resolution of the banking dispute regarding US$25 million in DPRK assets in Macau's Banco Delta Asia.
- 14 July: North Korea announces it is shutting down the Yongbyon reactor after receiving 6,200 tons in South Korean fuel oil aid.
- 17 July: A 10-person team of IAEA inspectors confirms that North Korea has shut down its Yongbyon reactor, a step IAEA Director Mohamed ElBaradei said was "a good step in the right direction". On the same day, a second shipment of 7,500 tons of oil aid was dispatched from South Korea for the North Korea city of Nampo, part of the 50,000 tons North Korea is due to receive in exchange for shutting down the reactor, according to the 13 February agreement.
- 11–13 September: Inspectors from the United States, China and Russia conduct a site visit at Yongbyon reactor to determine ways to permanently disable the reactor. U.S. delegation leader, Sung Kim, declared they "saw everything they had asked to see," State Department spokesman Sean McCormack said.

=== 2008 ===
- 25 February: CNN chief international correspondent Christiane Amanpour toured North Korea's nuclear plant. CNN was one of only two U.S. news organizations at the facility.
- 10 May: Sung Kim, the U.S. State Department's top Korea specialist, returned to South Korea by land across the heavily fortified border after collecting approximately 18,000 secret papers of Yongbyon nuclear reactor activities during a three-day visit to Pyongyang.
- 26 June: North Korea hands over 60 pages of documents detailing its capabilities in nuclear power and nuclear weapons
- 27 June: North Korea destroys a cooling tower at Yongbyon's main atomic reactor.
- 11 October: The US removes North Korea from its State Sponsors of Terrorism list.

=== 2009 ===
- 5 April: North Korea's launch of its Kwangmyŏngsŏng-2 satellite, intended to broadcast "immortal revolutionary songs," ends in failure.
- 14 April: Following a UN resolution denouncing its missile launch, North Korea says that it "will never again take part in such [six party] talks and will not be bound by any agreement reached at the talks." North Korea expelled nuclear inspectors from the country and also informed the IAEA that they would resume their nuclear weapons program.
- 25 April: North Korea says it has reactivated its nuclear facilities.
- 25 May: North Korea tests its second nuclear device.

=== 2012 ===
- April: North Korea prepares to test its third nuclear device.
- 13 April: North Korea's launch of its Kwangmyŏngsŏng-3 satellite, which fails shortly after launching. It was intended to mark the centenary of Kim Il Sung's 100th birthday, and was designed to estimate crop yields and collect weather data, as well as assess the country's forest coverage and natural resources.
- 12 December: North Korea's launch of its Kwangmyŏngsŏng-3 Unit 2 satellite that is meant to replace the failed Kwangmyŏngsŏng-3 satellite, and became the 10th space power that is capable of putting satellites in orbit using its own launch vehicles. The launch came during the period when the DPRK was commemorating the first anniversary of the death of former leader Kim Jong-il and just before the first South Korean domestic launch of a satellite and the South Korean presidential election on 19 December 2012.

=== 2013 ===
- 5 February: South Korea's President warned that North Korea could be planning "multiple nuclear tests at two places or more".
- 12 February: North Korea tests its third nuclear device.
- March–April: North Korea crisis (2013)

=== 2015 ===
- 20 May: North Korea claims to have nuclear weapons capable of hitting the United States.
- December: In early December, North Korea leader Kim Jong-un claimed that the country was prepared to detonate a hydrogen bomb, however significant doubts surround the claim.

=== 2016 ===
- 6 January: North Korea conducts its fourth nuclear test. Although the government claims it to be its first hydrogen bomb, the claim was met with significant skepticism.
- 6 July: A high-level DPRK Government spokesman's statement was made defining a more precise meaning of "denuclearization", as covering the whole Korean peninsula and its vicinity, signaling a willingness to continue negotiations on the topic.
- 9 September: North Korea conducts its fifth underground nuclear test. With an estimate yield of over 10kt, it would make it the most powerful North Korean nuclear test thus far.
- 26 October: United States Director of National Intelligence James Clapper said during a speech that persuading North Korea to abandon its program is "probably a lost cause" since, to North Korea, it was "their ticket to survival" and any discussions about ending their nuclear ambitions would be a "non-starter".

=== 2017 ===
- 6 March: North Korea launched four ballistic missiles, three of which landed 200 miles off Japan's coastline. Supreme leader Kim Jong-un promised that the country will eventually have nuclear-armed, intercontinental ballistic missiles that can reach the continental United States, thus challenging the Trump administration of the United States to review its policy options, including preemptive strikes or further isolation of the North Korean economy.
- 15 April: at the yearly major public holiday Day of the Sun, North Korea staged a massive military parade to commemorate the 105th birth anniversary of Kim Il-sung, the country's founder and grandfather of current leader, Kim Jong-un. The parade took place amid hot speculation in the United States, Japan, and South Korea that the country would look to also potentially test a sixth nuclear device, which it did not do.
- 3 September: At 3:31 AM UTC, the United States Geological Survey reported that it had detected a magnitude 6.3 earthquake in North Korea near the Punggye-ri Nuclear Test Site. Given the shallow depth of the quake and its proximity to North Korea's primary nuclear weapons testing facility, experts concluded that the country had conducted a sixth nuclear weapon test (2017 North Korean nuclear test). North Korea claimed that they had tested a hydrogen bomb capable of being mounted on an ICBM. The independent seismic monitoring agency NORSAR initially estimated that the blast had a yield of around 120 kilotons but subsequently revised to 250 kilotons of TNT (1,000 TJ) based on a tremor of 6.1M

=== 2018 ===
- 20 April: Kim Jong Un announces he would immediately suspend nuclear and missile testing and shut down the Punggye-ri site that was used for six earlier nuclear tests.
- 31 October: South Korea's National Intelligence Service conducts first ever inspection of North Korea's nuclear program and recommends international experts accept North Korea's invitation for an international inspection.

=== 2019 ===
- 1 December: North Korea announced it had recently conducted a "very important test" at its Sohae site. Some analysts believed the test involved a new ICBM engine, as the country was believed to be migrating from its liquid-fueled missiles to new solid-fueled versions that were easier to transport, conceal and launch.
- 14 December: The country announced it had conducted a "crucial test' at the Sohae site.
- 21 December: The New York Times reported that "American military and intelligence officials tracking North Korea’s actions by the hour say they are bracing for an imminent test of an intercontinental ballistic missile capable of reaching American shores, but appear resigned to the fact that President Trump has no good options to stop it." Pyongyang had previously promised a "Christmas gift" if progress was not seen on relaxation of American sanctions. NBC News published commercial satellite photos showing what appeared to be the production and modification of ICBM launchers at a Pyongsong site.
- 31 December: The Korean Central News Agency announced that Kim had abandoned his moratoriums on nuclear and intercontinental ballistic missile tests, quoting Kim as saying, "the world will witness a new strategic weapon to be possessed by the DPRK in the near future."

=== 2020 ===
- 17 January: John Hyden, Vice Chairman of the Joint Chiefs of Staff, states that North Korea is "building new missiles, new capabilities, new weapons as fast as anybody on the planet."
- 10 October: North Korea unveiled a massive ICBM during a military parade for the 75th anniversary of the Workers' Party of North Korea, with CNN reporting that it is one of the world's biggest road mobile ballistic missiles.

=== 2023 ===
- North Korea announced a new nuclear warhead called Hwasan-31 and diagrams of eight weapons that can carry this warhead, named Hwasong-11B, Hwasong-11C, Hwasong-11D, Hwasong-11S, Haeil, Hwasal-1 and Hwasal-2.

=== 2024 ===
- 22 April: North Korea claimed to have tested a new command and control system in a simulated nuclear counterattack.

=== 2026 ===
At a January 4 missile test, Kim Jong Un ordered the military to maintain and expand nuclear deterrence capabilities to a "highly developed basis".

On May 7, it was revealed that the Supreme People's Assembly adopted a new amendment on March 23 mandating automatic nuclear strikes as reprisals to a decapitation attack by a foreign country.

==== Rejection of denuclearization ====
North Korea have released a series of statements rejecting denuclearization throughout 2026. In June, North Korean officials (including Kim Yo Jong) released multiple press releases mentioning the irreversible nature of North Korea's nuclear weapons state status, one of which called denuclearization "a violation of its constitution and an infringement of sovereignty". Additional statements were made in the next month reaffirming the country's status as a nuclear-armed state and rejecting international calls for denuclearization of the Korean Peninsula.

== See also ==
- North Korea and weapons of mass destruction
- Timeline of nuclear weapons development
