= North Korea and weapons of mass destruction =

Democratic People's Republic of Korea
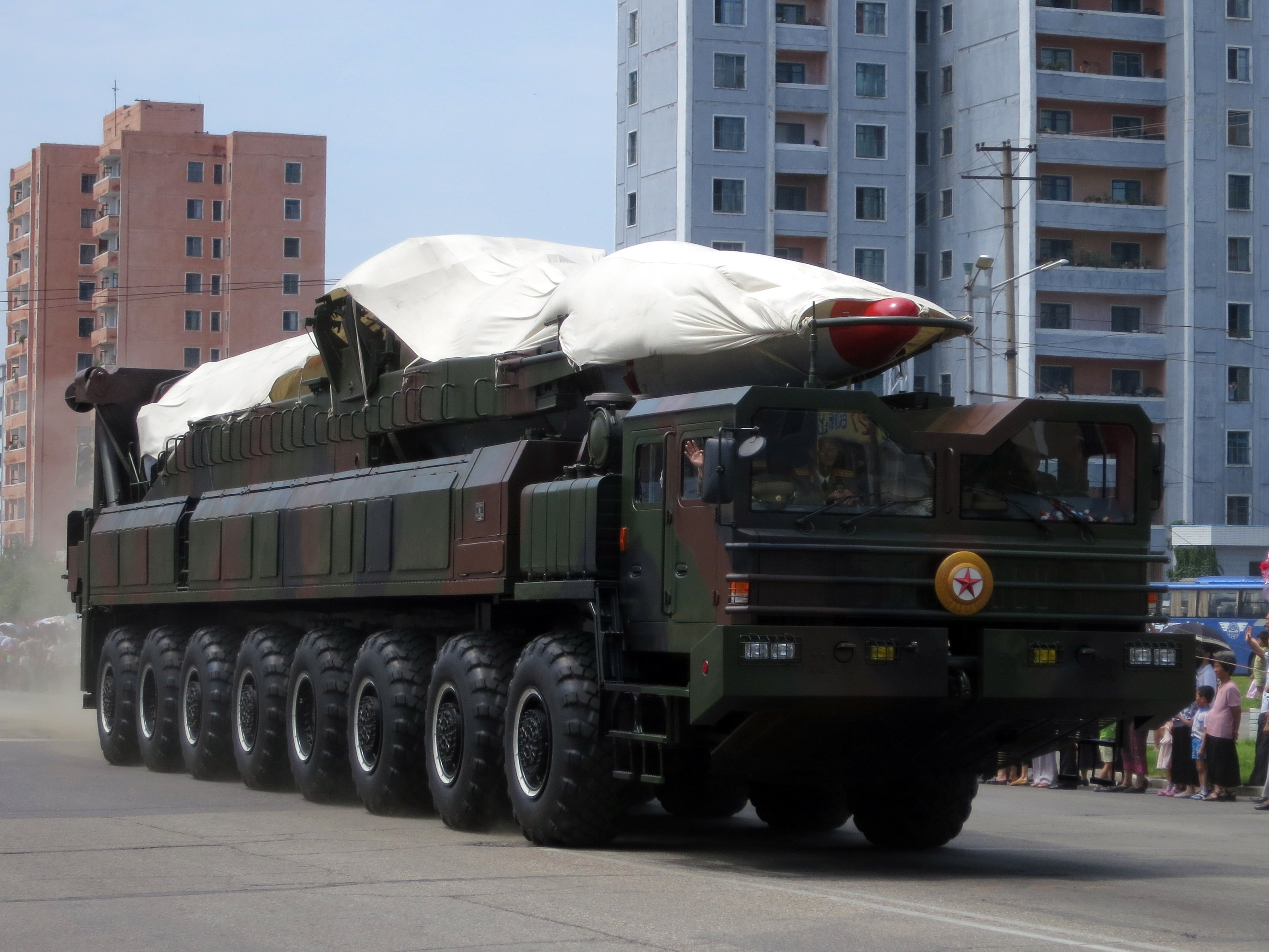
- A Hwasong-13, claimed as an intercontinental ballistic missile, on parade in 2013.

- Nuclear program start date: 1962
- First nuclear weapon test: October 9, 2006
- First thermonuclear weapon test: September 3, 2017
- Last nuclear test: September 3, 2017
- Largest yield test: 50-250 Kt (210-1,000 TJ): Underground – (September 3, 2017) 50 Kt based on Korea Meteorological Administration, and 250 Kt NORSAR revised estimate based on a tremor of 6.1M (Note: Yield is always disputed, since North Korea does not announce the exact amount after its tests.)
- Total tests: 6 detonations
- Current stockpile: 60 (2025 estimate)
- Deployed warheads: Unknown
- Maximum missile range: ICBM: 15,000 km (9,321 mi) (Note: Maximum range is always disputed, since North Korea rarely tests its missiles at maximum range.)
- Nuclear triad: No
- Strategic forces: Strategic Force; Hwasong family ballistic missiles; Hwasal-1 and -2 cruise missiles
- NPT party: No (withdrew in 2003)

North Korea has the world's smallest stockpile of nuclear weapons, with an estimated 60 warheads and production of fissile material for six to seven warheads per year. North Korea is the tenth country to develop and most recent to openly test nuclear weapons. North Korea is also believed to have one of the world's largest chemical weapons stockpiles. North Korea is party to the Biological Weapons Convention, one of four United Nations members not to ratify the Chemical Weapons Convention, and the only country to announce withdrawal from the Non-Proliferation Treaty (NPT). (Note: There are differing views over whether North Korea's withdrawal proceedings were valid under the treaty, and its current status in relation to the treaty.)

North Korea is the only country confirmed to conduct nuclear weapons tests in the 21st century, carrying out six underground tests at Punggye-ri from 2006 to 2017. Via these, North Korea is believed to have developed thermonuclear and boosted fission weapons. Despite its low warhead count, the Korean People's Army Strategic Force is estimated to operate over 363 ballistic missiles; 17 of these are intercontinental-range such as the Hwasong-17, another 27 are intermediate/medium-range such as the Hwasong-12, and the remaining 319 are short-range, primarily the Hwasong-11D. The Force also operates the Hwasal-1/-2 cruise missiles and reportedly tactical nuclear weapons. North Korea is developing submarine-launched ballistic missiles such as the Pukguksong-1 and Hwasong-11S. Its missile development is linked to its satellite program.

Posited motives for North Korean nuclear proliferation include the fall of communism, a wavering alliance with China, desire to deter and/or negotiate with the United States, or its domestic politics. Its program is closely tied to the Korean conflict, which partially stems from the lack of a peace treaty concluding the Korean War; South Korea hosted US nuclear weapons from 1958 to 1991, and pursued a domestic nuclear weapons program from 1970 to 1981.

North Korea had developed nuclear technology at its Nyongbyon facility since the 1960s, with supply from the Soviet Union. After joining the NPT in 1989, it failed to comply with International Atomic Energy Agency (IAEA) safeguards. In 1993, after its noncompliance was reported to the UN Security Council, North Korea announced intent to withdraw from the NPT, triggering a diplomatic crisis. Under a 1994 framework, North Korea agreed to freeze its nuclear development and suspend its NPT withdrawal, while the US would arrange for construction of two light water reactors in North Korea. The framework collapsed in 2003, when North Korea expelled IAEA inspectors and announced immediate NPT withdrawal. The subsequent six-party talks continued until 2007 but made little progress. North Korea's first nuclear test in 2006 was met with international sanctions.

Subsequent nuclear and missile tests have been internationally provocative, leading to a crisis in 2017–2018. In 2024, North Korea signed a security treaty with Russia, gaining sanctions bypasses and potential technology transfer. North Korea has also exported missiles to Egypt, Iran, Syria, and Pakistan, and assisted the construction of the Al Kibar reactor of the Syrian nuclear weapons program. North Korea is widely believed to have a chemical weapons arsenal of up to 5,000 tons, including sarin and mustard gas. Kim Jong Un is widely believed to have ordered the 2017 assassination of Kim Jong-nam, which used the chemical nerve agent, VX. It is unclear if North Korea has an offensive biological weapons program, although like many countries it has the industrial capability for one.

== History ==
North Korea showed an interest in developing nuclear weapons as early as the 1950s. The nuclear program can be traced back to about 1962, when North Korea committed itself to what it called "all-fortressization", which was the beginning of the hyper-militarized North Korea of today. In 1963, North Korea asked the Soviet Union for help in developing nuclear weapons, but was refused. The Soviet Union agreed to help North Korea develop a peaceful nuclear energy program, including the training of nuclear scientists. Later, China, after its nuclear tests, similarly rejected North Korean requests for help with developing nuclear weapons.

Soviet engineers took part in the construction of the Yongbyon Nuclear Scientific Research Center and began construction of an IRT-2000 research reactor in 1963, which became operational in 1965 and was upgraded to 8 MW in 1974. In 1979, North Korea began to build a second research reactor in Yongbyon, as well as an ore processing plant and a fuel rod fabrication plant.

In 1985 North Korea ratified the NPT but did not include the required safeguards agreement with the International Atomic Energy Agency (IAEA) until 1992. In early 1993, while verifying North Korea's initial declaration, the IAEA concluded that there was strong evidence this declaration was incomplete. When North Korea refused the requested special inspection, the IAEA reported its noncompliance to the UN Security Council. In 1993, North Korea announced its withdrawal from the NPT, but suspended that withdrawal before it took effect.

Under the 1994 Agreed Framework, the U.S. government would facilitate the supply of two 1000 MW LWRs to North Korea in exchange for freezing North Koreas nuclear program.. The Korean Peninsula Energy Development Organization (KEDO) was established for that purpose and undertook to finance and build two South Korean KEPCO E&C Korean Standard Nuclear Plantreactors at the Kumho site in North Korea. Light-water reactor technology requires uranium enrichment, and is intrinsically less likely to enable proliferation (Note: Most references use proliferation resistance as a term-of-art, meaning the degree of feasibility to obtain weapon-usable nuclear material, particularly weapons-grade nuclear material, from a nuclear energy system's fuel cycle, whether for technical reasons (intrinsic resistance) or from external safeguards (extrinsic resistance).) than North Korea's graphite-moderated reactors that can run on natural uranium, and generate weapons-grade plutonium. Following the U.S. Congress's rejection of U.S. funding for reactor construction, South Korea and Japan led financing of the multibillion-dollar reactor construction. While both the United States and North Korea were interested in the latter's adoption of water-moderated reactors, Kim Jong-il's motivation was more technological and less political; and the Agreed Framework was not enough to ensure nonproliferation compliance. The Clinton administration was unable to fulfil its side of the agreement, as the Republican Party's late 1994 legislative wins allowed it to withhold funding the Agreement's Korean Peninsula Energy Development Organization. KEPCO began development on a large site near the city of Sinpo. This was abandoned when the Agreed Framework fell apart in 2002, with each side blaming the other for its failure. By 2002, Pakistan had admitted that North Korea had gained access to Pakistan's nuclear technology in the late 1990s.

Based on evidence from Pakistan, Libya, and multiple statements made by the DPRK government, the United States accused North Korea of noncompliance and halted oil shipments; North Korea later claimed its public confession of guilt had been deliberately misconstrued. By the end of 2002, the Agreed Framework was officially abandoned.

In 2003, North Korea again announced its withdrawal from the Nuclear Non-Proliferation Treaty. In 2005, it admitted to having nuclear weapons but committed to abandon them in the context of the Six-Party Talks.

On October 9, 2006, North Korea announced it had successfully conducted its first nuclear test. An underground nuclear explosion was detected, its yield was estimated as less than a kiloton, and some radioactive output was detected. On January 6, 2007, the North Korean government further confirmed that it had nuclear weapons.

On March 17, 2007, North Korea told delegates at international nuclear talks that it was preparing to shut down its main nuclear facility. The agreement was reached following a series of six-party talks, involving North Korea, South Korea, China, Russia, Japan, and the United States, which began in 2003. According to the agreement, a list of its nuclear programs would be submitted and the nuclear facility would be disabled in exchange for fuel aid and normalization talks with the United States and Japan. This was delayed from April due to a dispute with the United States over Banco Delta Asia, but on July 14, IAEA inspectors confirmed the shutdown of North Korea's Yongbyon nuclear reactor and consequently North Korea began to receive aid. This agreement fell apart in 2009, following a North Korean satellite launch.

In April 2009, reports surfaced that North Korea had become a "fully fledged nuclear power", an opinion shared by International Atomic Energy Agency (IAEA) Director General Mohamed ElBaradei. On May 25, 2009, North Korea conducted a second nuclear test, resulting in an explosion estimated to be between 2 and 7 kilotons. The 2009 test, like the 2006 test, is believed to have occurred at Mantapsan, Kilju County, in the north-eastern part of North Korea. This was found by an earthquake occurring at the test site.

In February 2012, North Korea announced that it would suspend uranium enrichment at the Yongbyon Nuclear Scientific Research Center and not conduct any further tests of nuclear weapons while productive negotiations involving the United States continued. This agreement included a moratorium on long-range missile tests. Additionally, North Korea agreed to allow IAEA inspectors to monitor operations at Yongbyon. The United States reaffirmed that it had no hostile intent toward the DPRK and was prepared to improve bilateral relationships, and agreed to ship humanitarian food aid to North Korea. The United States called the move "important, if limited", but said it would proceed cautiously and that talks would resume only after North Korea made steps toward fulfilling its promise. However, after North Korea conducted a long-range missile test in April 2012, the United States decided not to proceed with food aid.

On February 11, 2013, the U.S. Geological Survey detected a magnitude 5.1 seismic disturbance, reported to be a third underground nuclear test. North Korea has officially reported it as a successful nuclear test with a lighter warhead that delivers more force than before but has not revealed the exact yield. Multiple South Korean sources estimated the yield to have been 6–9 kilotons, while the German Federal Institute for Geosciences and Natural Resources estimated the yield to have been 40 kilotons. However, the German estimate has since been revised to a yield equivalent of 14 kt when they published their estimations in January 2016.

On January 6, 2016, in North Korea, the U.S. Geological Survey detected a magnitude 5.1 seismic disturbance, reported to be a fourth underground nuclear test. North Korea claimed that this test involved a hydrogen bomb. This claim has not been verified. A "hydrogen bomb" could refer to several stages of fusion development, ranging from boosted fission devices to true thermonuclear weapons.

Within hours, many nations and organizations had condemned the test. Expert U.S. analysts do not believe that a hydrogen bomb was detonated. Seismic data collected so far suggest a 6–9 kiloton yield and that magnitude is not consistent with the power that would be generated by a hydrogen bomb explosion. "What we're speculating is they tried to do a boosted nuclear device, which is an atomic bomb that has a little bit of hydrogen, an isotope in it called tritium," said Joseph Cirincione, president of the global security firm Ploughshares Fund. The German source which estimates for all North Korea's past nuclear tests has instead made an initial estimation of 14 kt, which is about the same (revised) yield as its previous nuclear test in 2013. However, the yield estimation for January 2016 nuclear test was revised to 10 kt in subsequent nuclear tests from North Korea.

On February 7, 2016, roughly a month after the alleged hydrogen bomb test, North Korea claimed to have put a satellite into orbit around the Earth. Japanese prime minister Shinzō Abe had warned North Korea to not launch the rocket, and if it did and the rocket violated Japanese territory, it would be shot down. Nevertheless, North Korea launched the rocket, leading the United States, Japan, and South Korea to criticize the launch. Despite North Korean claims that the rocket was for peaceful, scientific purposes, it has been heavily criticized as an attempt to perform an ICBM test under the guise of a satellite launch. China also criticized the launch, urging "the relevant parties" to "refrain from taking actions that may further escalate tensions on the Korean peninsula".

A fifth nuclear test occurred on September 9, 2016. This test yield is considered the highest among all five tests thus far, surpassing its previous record in 2013. The South Korean government said that the yield was about 10 kt despite other sources suggesting a 20 to 30 kt yield. The same German source which has made estimation of all North Korea's previous nuclear tests suggested an estimation of a 25 kiloton yield. Other nations and the United Nations have responded to North Korea's ongoing missile and nuclear development with a variety of sanctions; on March 2, 2016, the UN Security Council voted to impose additional sanctions against North Korea.

In 2017, North Korea test-launched two ICBMs, the second of which had sufficient range to reach the continental United States. In September 2017, the country announced a further "perfect" hydrogen bomb test.

Until 2022, North Korea's stated policy position was that nuclear weapons "will never be abused or used as a means for preemptive strike", but if there is an "attempt to have recourse to military force against us" North Korea may use their "most powerful offensive strength in advance to punish them". This was not a full no first use policy. This policy changed in 2022 with a law approved by the Supreme People's Assembly, which states that in the case of an attack against the top leadership or the nuclear command and control system, nuclear attacks against the enemy would be launched automatically. Additionally, the new law indicates that if Kim Jong Un was killed, authorization of nuclear strikes would pass to a senior official.

Since 2023, North Korea has taken a more transparent approach to its nuclear activities, signaling an expansion of its nuclear program. Leader Kim Jong Un unveiled facilities involved in weapons production, including centrifuge halls and small reactors, emphasizing plans to deploy large numbers of tactical nuclear weapons. North Korea is estimated to possess enough material for up to 90 warheads and has reportedly assembled around 50 nuclear weapons. These revelations have heightened international concerns over North Korea's capabilities and the potential threat to the U.S. mainland and its allies.

In September 2026, North Korea reported the testing of a new missile or missile-related weapons system under the supervision of Kim Jong Un. South Korean authorities separately reported the launch of two short-range ballistic missiles from North Korea's east coast. The developments coincided with renewed US–South Korea–Japan discussions on security and the denuclearization of the Korean Peninsula.

== Nuclear weapons ==
North Korea's nuclear programme has been the subject of international concern for decades. Previous agreements, including the 1992 Joint Declaration of the Denuclearization of the Korean Peninsula and the 2018 Panmunjom Declaration, included commitments related to denuclearization. Over time, however, North Korea moved away from negotiations on dismantling its nuclear weapons programme. In recent years, North Korea has described its nuclear weapons as essential to national security. In 2022, the country adopted legislation defining its nuclear weapons policy and later continued to expand its missile and nuclear capabilities. North Korean leader Kim Jong Un has repeatedly said that the country would continue to strengthen its nuclear deterrent.

=== Overview ===
Location of North Korea's nuclear tests
1: 2006; 2: 2009; 3: 2013; 4: 2016-01; 5: 2016-09; 6: 2017;
V

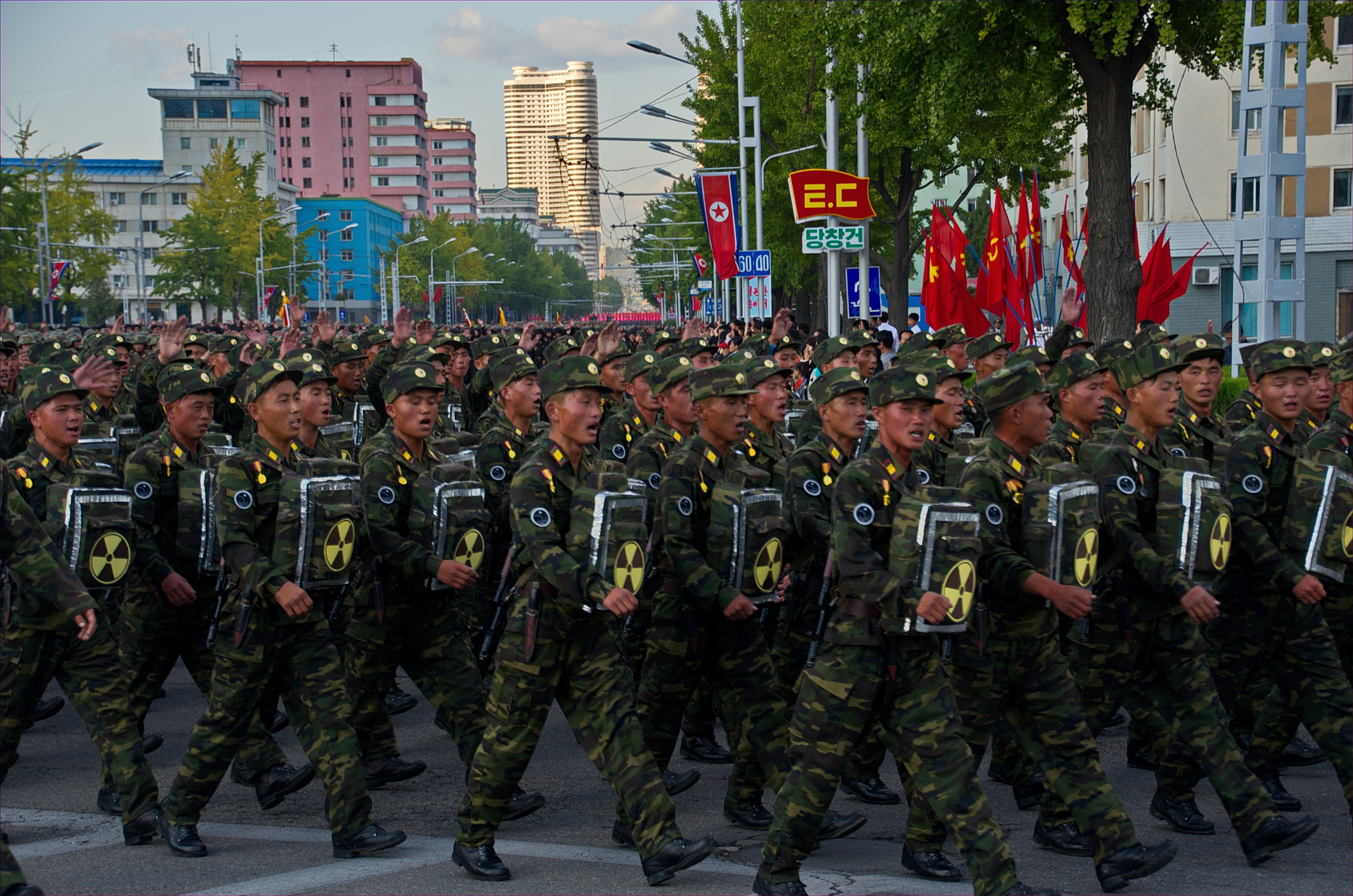
Military parade in Pyongyang, 2015 featuring soldiers with CBRN equipment

As of 2025, North Korea's arsenal is estimated as the world's smallest, with around 50 nuclear weapons and production of fissile material for six to seven nuclear weapons per year. The British International Institute for Strategic Studies think tank estimates North Korea's strategic missile forces, under the Korean People's Army Strategic Force, at over 363 missiles, 44 of which have a range greater than 1,000 km. The think tank points out that there is no conclusive evidence that North Korea has ever successfully integrated a nuclear warhead with a missile system.

The force is estimated at over 17 intercontinental ballistic missiles (over 11 Hwasong-17, over 6 Hwasong-14/-15/-18, and some Hwasong-19, all undergoing testing). Another 10 or more are intermediate-range ballistic missile (over 10 Hwasong-12, some Hwasong-16A/-16B, all undergoing testing). Another 17 are medium-range ballistic missiles (around 10 Hwasong-7, over 7 Pukguksong-2 undergoing testing, some Hwasong-9). Finally, 319 are various types of short-range ballistic missile. Of these, there are an estimated 250 Hwasong-11D missiles.

From 2016 until 2022, North Korea maintained a policy of no first use of nuclear weapons.

The Korean Central News Agency claims that the "U.S. has long posed nuclear threats to the DPRK" and "the U.S. was seized by a foolish ambition to bring down the DPRK", so it "needed a countermeasure". North Korea has been suspected of maintaining a clandestine nuclear weapons development program since the early 1980s, when it constructed a plutonium-producing Magnox nuclear reactor at Yongbyon. Various diplomatic means have been used by the international community to attempt to limit North Korea's nuclear program to peaceful power generation and to encourage North Korea to participate in international treaties.

In May 1992, the International Atomic Energy Agency's (IAEA) first inspection in North Korea uncovered discrepancies suggesting that the country had reprocessed more plutonium than declared. IAEA requested access to additional information and access to two nuclear waste sites at Yongbyon. North Korea rejected the IAEA request and announced on March 12, 1993, an intention to withdraw from the NPT.

In 1994, North Korea pledged, under the Agreed Framework with the United States, to freeze its plutonium programs and dismantle all its nuclear weapons programs in return for the normalization of diplomatic relations and several kinds of assistance, including resources for alternative energy supplies.

By 2002, the United States believed North Korea was pursuing both uranium enrichment technology and plutonium reprocessing technologies in defiance of the Agreed Framework. North Korea reportedly told American diplomats in private that they were in possession of nuclear weapons, citing American failures to uphold their own end of the Agreed Framework as a motivating force. North Korea later "clarified" that it did not possess weapons yet, but that it had "a right" to possess them, despite the Agreed Framework. In late 2002 and early 2003, North Korea began to take steps to eject International Atomic Energy Agency inspectors while re-routing spent fuel rods to be used for plutonium reprocessing for weapons purposes. As late as the end of 2003, North Korea claimed that it would freeze its nuclear program in exchange for additional American concessions, but a final agreement was not reached. North Korea withdrew from the Nuclear Non-Proliferation Treaty in 2003.

==== 2006 ====
On October 9, 2006, North Korea demonstrated its nuclear capabilities with its first underground nuclear test, detonating a plutonium-based device with an estimated yield of 0.2–1 kilotons. The test was conducted at Punggye-ri Nuclear Test Site in North Hamgyong Province, and U.S. intelligence officials later announced that analysis of radioactive debris in air samples collected a few days after the test confirmed that the blast had taken place. The UN Security Council condemned the test and announced the imposition of Resolution 1718.

==== Aftermath of 2006 nuclear test ====
On January 6, 2007, the North Korean government further confirmed that it had nuclear weapons.

In February 2007, following the six-party talks disarmament process, Pyongyang agreed to shut down its main nuclear reactor. On October 8, 2008, IAEA inspectors were forbidden by the North Korean government to conduct further inspections of the site.

==== 2009 ====
On April 25, 2009, the North Korean government announced the country's nuclear facilities had been reactivated, and that spent fuel reprocessing for arms-grade plutonium had been restored.

On May 25, 2009, North Korea conducted its second underground nuclear test. The U.S. Geological Survey calculated its origin in proximity to the site of the first nuclear test. The test, estimated at 2 to 7 kilotons, was more powerful than the previous test. The same day, a successful short-range missile test was also conducted.

==== 2010 ====
In May 2010, the North Korean government claimed to have successfully performed nuclear fusion. Although the claim was largely dismissed at the time, a 2012 analysis of radioisotopes suggested that North Korea may have performed two nuclear tests involving fusion. The paper was met with skepticism, as subsequent analysis of seismic data suggested no tests took place. In 2014, a study using seismic data found evidence for nuclear testing; however, a 2016 study once again dismissed claims of nuclear testing, suggesting that the seismic data was indicative of a minor earthquake. In 2024, a study dismissed the arguments in the 2016 study for a small earthquake and presented new seismic evidence confirming the occurrence of a small nuclear test on May 12, 2010 as suggested in the 2014 study.

==== 2013 ====
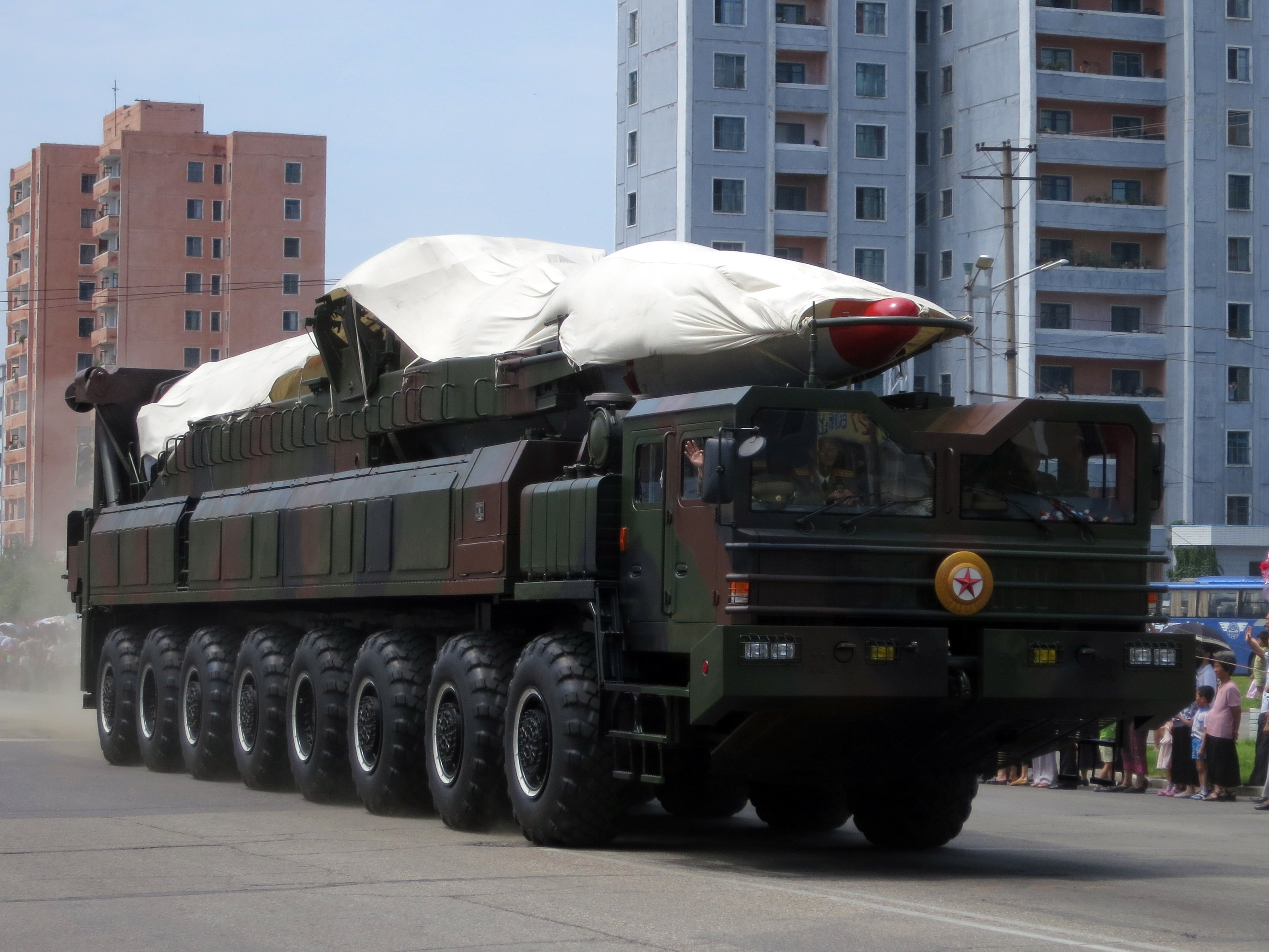
North Korea's ballistic missile

On February 12, monitors in Asia picked up unusual seismic activity at a North Korean facility at 11:57 (02:57 GMT), later determined to be an artificial quake with an initial magnitude 4.9 (later revised to 5.1). In The Korean Central News Agency subsequently said that the country had detonated a miniaturized nuclear device with "greater explosive force" in an underground test. According to the Korea Institute of Geoscience and Mineral Resources, the estimated yield was 7.7–7.8 kilotons. Other researchers estimate the yield to have been 12.2 ± 3.8 kilotons.

==== December 2015 hydrogen bomb claim ====
In December 2015, Kim Jong Un suggested that the country had the capacity to launch a hydrogen bomb, a device of considerably more power than conventional atomic bombs used in previous tests. The remark was met with skepticism from the White House and from South Korean officials.

==== 2016 ====
===== First claimed North Korean hydrogen bomb test =====
On January 7, after reports of a magnitude 5.1 earthquake originating in northeast North Korea at 10:00:01 UTC+08:30, the country's regime released statements that it had successfully tested a hydrogen bomb. Whether this was in fact a hydrogen bomb has yet to be proven. Experts have cast doubt on this claim. A South Korean spy expert suggested that it may have been an atomic bomb and not a hydrogen bomb. Experts in several countries, including South Korea have expressed doubts about the claimed technology because of the relatively small size of the explosion. Senior Defense Analyst Bruce W. Bennett of research organization RAND told the BBC that "Kim Jong-un is either lying, saying they did a hydrogen test when they didn't, they just used a little bit more efficient fission weapon – or the hydrogen part of the test really didn't work very well or the fission part didn't work very well."

===== Aftermath of claimed North Korean hydrogen bomb test =====
Kim Jong Un, with what North Korea claims is a miniaturized silver spherical nuclear bomb, at a missile factory in early 2016.

On March 9, 2016, North Korea released a video of Kim Jong Un visiting a missile factory. The international community was skeptical, IHS Jane's Karl Dewey said that "It is possible that the silver sphere is a simple atomic bomb. But it is not a hydrogen bomb." Furthermore, he said "a hydrogen bomb would not only be in two parts but also be a different shape".

Nations across the world, as well as NATO and the UN, spoke out against the tests as destabilizing, as a danger to international security and as a breach of UN Security Council resolutions. China, one of North Korea's allies, also denounced the test.

===== First nuclear warhead test explosion =====
On September 9, 2016, a 5.3 seismic tremor was detected by seismographs in surrounding countries, after which North Korea confirmed it had conducted another nuclear test. North Korea stated that this test has enabled them to confirm that its warhead can be mounted to a missile and to verify the warhead's power. It was previously doubted that North Korea could pair the nuclear warhead and missile together, but South Korean experts have started to believe that North Korea could accomplish this goal within a few years after the September 9 nuclear test.

==== 2017 ====
On February 18, 2017, China announced that it was suspending all imports of coal from North Korea as part of its effort to enact United Nations Security Council sanctions aimed at stopping the country's nuclear weapons and ballistic-missile program. On March 6, 2017, North Korea launched four ballistic missiles from the Tongchang-ri region towards the Sea of Japan. The launch was condemned by the United Nations as well as South Korea. The move prompted US Secretary of State Rex Tillerson to embark on a diplomatic mission ten days later to Japan, South Korea and China, in an effort to address heightened international tensions in the region. On April 13, 2017, White House representative Nick Rivero was quoted as saying the United States was "very close" to engaging in some sort of retaliation towards North Korea. President Trump commented on North Korea by saying they will fight the war on terrorism no matter the cost.

On April 15, 2017, at the yearly major public holiday also known in the country as the Day of the Sun, North Korea staged a massive military parade to commemorate the 105th birth anniversary of Kim Il Sung, the country's founder and grandfather of current leader, Kim Jong Un. The parade took place amid hot speculation in the United States, Japan, and South Korea that the country would also potentially test a sixth nuclear device, but failed to do so. The parade did publicly display, for the first time, two new intercontinental ballistic missile-sized canisters as well as submarine-launched ballistic missiles and a land-based version of the same.

On April 16, 2017, hours after the military parade in Pyongyang, North Korea attempted to launch a ballistic missile from a site near the port of Sinpo, on the country's east coast. The missile exploded seconds after its launch.

Later that month, after a visit to Washington by the top Chinese leader, the US State Department announced that North Korea was likely to face economic sanctions from China if it conducted any further tests.

On April 28, 2017, North Korea launched an unidentified ballistic missile over Pukchang airfield, in North Korean territory. It blew up shortly after take-off at an altitude of approximately 70 km (44 mi).

On July 4, 2017, North Korea launched Hwasong-14 from Banghyon airfield, near Kusong, in a lofted trajectory it claims lasted 39 minutes for 930 km (578 mi), landing in the waters of the Japanese exclusive economic zone. US Pacific Command said the missile was aloft for 37 minutes, meaning that on a standard trajectory it could have reached all of Alaska, a distance of 6,690 km (4,160 mi). By targeting deep waters in the Sea of Japan, North Korea was ensuring that American or Japanese divers would encounter difficulties when attempting to recover Hwasong-14's engine. Equally, North Korea was not attempting to recover any re-entry debris either, which South Korea pointed out is an indication that this first launch was of an ICBM which was far from ready for combat. As of July 2017, the U.S. estimated that North Korea would have a reliable nuclear-capable intercontinental ballistic missile (ICBM) by early 2018. On July 28, North Korea launched a second, apparently more advanced, ICBM, with an altitude of around 3,700 km (2,300 mi), that traveled 1,000 km (620 mi) down range; analysts estimated that it was capable of reaching the continental United States.

Aerospace engineer and weapons analyst Dr. John Schilling estimates the current accuracy of the North's Hwasong-14 as poor, at the mooted ranges which threaten US cities. Michael Elleman points out that July 28, 2017 missile re-entry vehicle broke up on re-entry; further testing would be required. On August 8, 2017 The Washington Post reported that the Defense Intelligence Agency, in a confidential assessment, stated that North Korea has sufficiently miniaturized a nuclear warhead to fit inside one of its long-range missiles. On August 12 The Diplomat reported that the Central Intelligence Agency, in a confidential assessment from early August, has concluded that the reentry vehicle in the July 28 test of Hwasong-14 did not survive atmospheric reentry due to apogee of 3,700 kilometers which caused structural stresses in excess of what an ICBM would have had in minimum energy trajectory. The CIA also concluded that North Korean reentry vehicle is likely advanced enough that it would likely survive reentry under normal minimum energy trajectory.

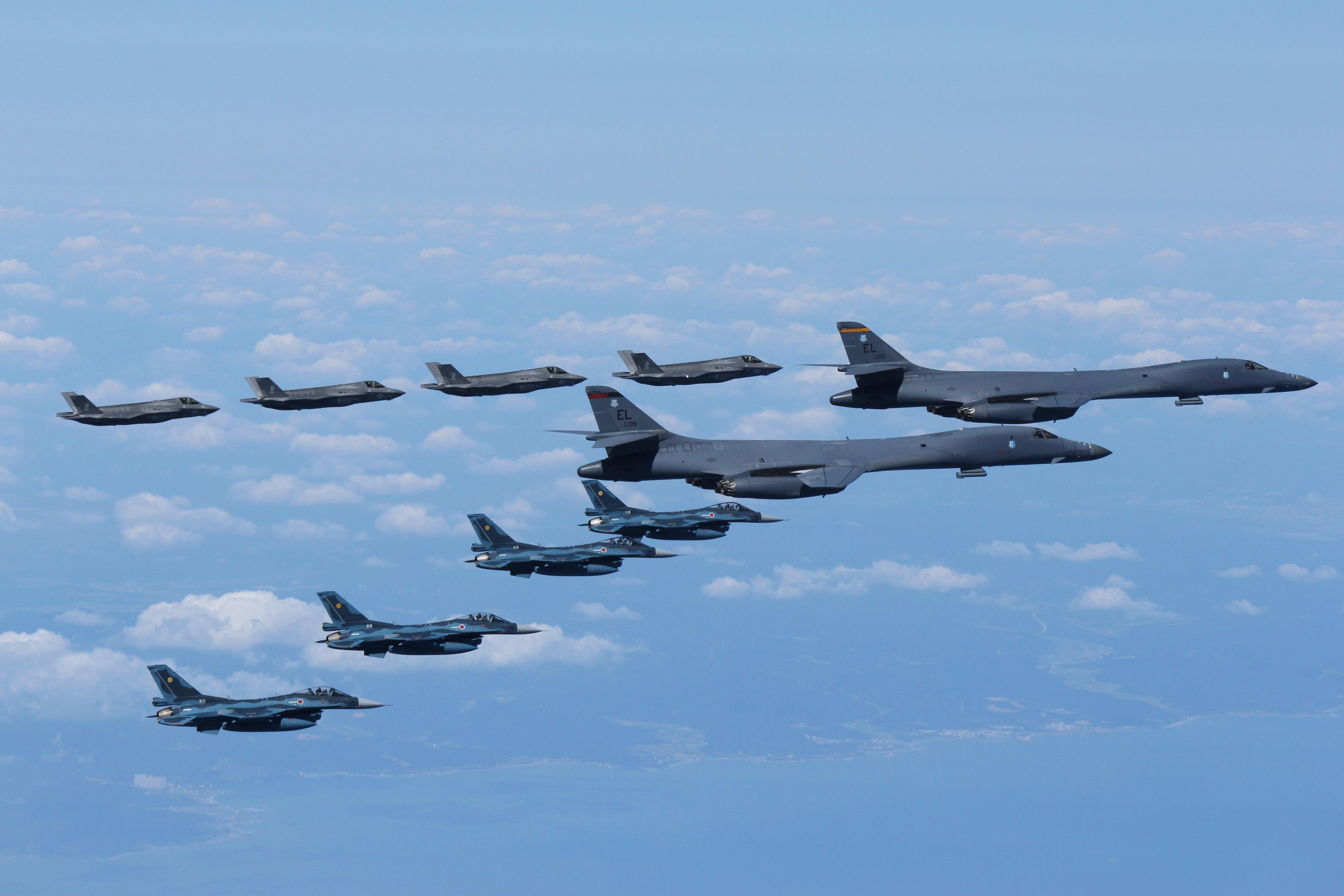
US B-1B bombers, F-35B fighters and Japanese F-2 fighters fly over the Pacific on September 17, 2017, in response to North Korean nuclear and missile testing.

On September 3, 2017, North Korea claimed to have successfully tested a thermonuclear bomb, also known as a hydrogen bomb. Corresponding seismic activity similar to an earthquake of magnitude 6.3 was reported by the USGS, making the blast around 10 times more powerful than previous detonations by the country. Later the bomb yield was estimated to be 250 kilotons, based on further study of seismic data. The test was reported to be "a perfect success" by North Korean authorities.

Jane's Information Group estimates the explosive payload of the North Korean thermonuclear/hydrogen Teller-Ulam type bomb to weigh between 255 and 360 kilograms (562 and 794 lb).

On November 20, 2017, U.S. President Donald Trump announced that North Korea had been re-listed by the State Department as a state sponsor of terrorism. Japan and South Korea welcomed the move as a method of increasing pressure on North Korea to negotiate about denuclearization.

On November 28, 2017, North Korea fired an intercontinental ballistic missile in the first such launch from the country in more than two months. The missile, believed by the U.S. military to be an ICBM, was launched from Sain Ni and flew roughly 1,000 km (620 mi) before landing in the Sea of Japan.

After North Korea claimed that the missile was capable of "carrying [a] super-heavy [nuclear] warhead and hitting the whole mainland of the U.S.", Kim-Jong-Un announced that they had "finally realized the great historic cause of completing the state nuclear force", putting them in a position of strength to push the United States into talks.

==== 2019 ====
In August 2019, Japan upgraded its estimate of North Korea's nuclear weapons capability in an upcoming annual Defence White Paper, saying it seems Pyongyang has achieved the miniaturization of warheads. The defence report will maintain Japan's contention that North Korea's nuclear and ballistic missile programs pose a "serious and imminent threat" to its security after recent meetings between Donald Trump and the North's leader, Kim Jong Un, failed to make progress on denuclearisation.

==== 2020 ====
Bruce Klingner of the U.S.-based Heritage Foundation estimated, in June 2020, that North Korea has likely built "eight or more additional nuclear weapons" since the 2018 summit.

On October 10, 2020, North Korea unveiled a massive ICBM during a military parade for the 75th anniversary of the Workers' Party of Korea, with CNN reporting that military analysts believe it is one of the world's largest road-mobile ballistic missiles.

==== 2022 ====
In the first 4 weeks of 2022, North Korea conducted 7 missile tests. Missiles tested included a hypersonic glide vehicle, an intermediate range ballistic missile (IRBM) and various cruise missiles.

On September 9, 2022, North Korea passed a law declaring itself a nuclear weapons state and rejected any possibility of denuclearisation.

==== 2023 ====
On March 24, 2023, North Korea unveiled the Hwasan-31 tactical nuclear bomb with at least 10 warheads shown with an estimated diameter from 40 to 50 centimeters as reported by the South Korean media. Hwasong-11A (KN-23) and KN-25 ballistic missiles are capable of carrying it. In September 2023, the Supreme People's Assembly unanimously adopted a new amendment to enshrine the North Korea's nuclear program into the constitution, citing the program and right as a deterrent against United States provocation. In December 2023, North Korea launched an ICBM (a Hwasong-18) in a test fire which according to South Korea and Japan would be capable of hitting any target within the United States mainland.

==== 2024 ====
In April 2024, North Korea claimed to have tested a new command and control system in a simulated nuclear counterattack. On October 30, North Korea launched its first intercontinental ballistic missile since December 2023. The South Korean Joint Chiefs of Staff stated that the launch may have been timed to the 2024 United States elections. The missile traveled for about 86 minutes before landing off of North Korea's east coast.

==== 2026 ====
At a January 4 missile test, Kim Jong Un ordered the military to maintain and expand nuclear deterrence capabilities to a "highly developed basis".

On May 7, it was revealed that the Supreme People's Assembly adopted a new amendment on March 23 mandating automatic nuclear strikes as reprisals to a decapitation attack by a foreign country.

Rejection of denuclearization

North Korea have released a series of statements rejecting denuclearization throughout 2026. In June, North Korean officials (including Kim Yo Jong) released multiple press releases mentioning the irreversible nature of North Korea's nuclear weapons state status, one of which called denuclearization "a violation of its constitution and an infringement of sovereignty". Additional statements were made in the next month reaffirming the country's status as a nuclear-armed state and rejecting international calls for denuclearization of the Korean Peninsula.

The statements came amid closer military and diplomatic ties between North Korea and Russia during the Russo-Ukrainian war. North Korea had provided military support to Russia, including troops and weapons, according to United States, South Korean and Ukrainian officials.

In June 2026, Kim Yo Jong, the sister of North Korean leader Kim Jong Un and a senior official of the Workers' Party of Korea, condemned a Group of Seven call for the denuclearization of North Korea. She said the demand infringed North Korea's sovereignty and reiterated the country's position as a nuclear state. On 26 July 2026, the ASEAN Regional Forum issued a statement calling for the complete denuclearization of the Korean Peninsula. The following day, Kim Yo Jong rejected the call. In a statement carried by the Korean Central News Agency, she said that North Korea regarded nuclear deterrence as the main guarantee of its security and described the country's nuclear status as final and irreversible. She also said that North Korea would continue to develop its nuclear capabilities.

The North Korean statements came against a background of continued international support for denuclearization of the Korean Peninsula. The ASEAN Regional Forum has repeatedly endorsed denuclearization as a long-term objective, while the United States and South Korea have continued to call for North Korea to return to dialogue and comply with relevant United Nations Security Council resolutions. South Korea's Unification Ministry said it would continue to pursue a realistic and practical approach to denuclearization and monitor North Korea's activities closely.

=== Fissile material production ===
==== Plutonium facilities ====
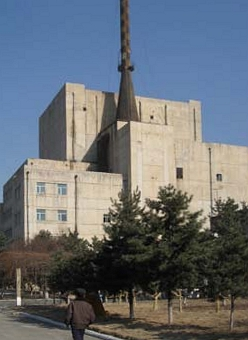
5 MWe experimental reactor at Yongbyon Nuclear Scientific Research Center

North Korea's nuclear reactors are located at the Yongbyon Nuclear Scientific Research Center, about 90 km north of Pyongyang.

- One Soviet-supplied IRT-2000 research reactor, completed in 1967. Uranium irradiated in this reactor was used in North Korea's first plutonium separation experiments in 1975. Nevertheless, the primary purpose of the reactor is not to produce plutonium and North Korea has had trouble acquiring enough fuel for constant operation. The U.S. Department of Energy estimated that this reactor could have been used to produce up to 1–2 kg of plutonium, though the Joint Atomic Energy Intelligence Committee said that the amount was no more than a few hundred grams.
- A newer nuclear reactor with a capacity of 5 MWe. This gas-graphite moderated Magnox type reactor is North Korea's main reactor, where practically all of its plutonium has been produced. A full core consists of 8,000 fuel rods and can yield a maximum of 27–29 kg of plutonium if left in the reactor for optimal burnup. The North Korean Plutonium Stock, Mid-2006, is estimated to be able to produce 0.9 grams of plutonium per thermal megawatt every day of its operation. The material required to make a single bomb is approximately four to eight kilograms. Often, North Korea has unloaded the reactor before reaching the maximum burnup level. There are three known cores which were unloaded in 1994 (under IAEA supervision in accordance with the Agreed Framework), 2005, and 2007.

In 1989, the 5 MWe reactor was shut down for a period of seventy to a hundred days. In this time it is estimated that up to fifteen kilograms of plutonium could have been extracted. In 1994, North Korea unloaded its reactors again. The IAEA had these under full surveillance until later being denied the ability to observe North Korean power plants. Under normal operation, the reactor can produce about 6 kg of plutonium per year although the reactor would need to be shut down and the fuel rods extracted to begin the plutonium separation process. Hence, plutonium separation stages alternate with plutonium production stages. Reprocessing (also known as separation) is known to have taken place in 2003 for the first core and 2005 for the second core.

- Two Magnox reactors (50 MWe and 200 MWe), under construction at Yongbyon and Taechon. If completed, 50 MWe reactor would be capable of producing 60 kg of plutonium per year, enough for approximately 10 weapons and 200 MWe reactor 220 kg of plutonium annually, enough for approximately 40 weapons. Construction was halted in 1994 about a year from completion in accord with the Agreed Framework, and by 2004 the structures and pipework had deteriorated badly.
- Fuel reprocessing facility that recovers uranium and plutonium from spent fuel using the PUREX process. Based on extended Eurochemic reprocessing plant design at the Mol-Dessel site in Belgium. In 1994 its activity was frozen in accordance with the Agreed Framework. On April 25, 2009, North Korean news agency KCNA, reported the resumption of reprocessing of spent fuel to recover plutonium.

On March 12, 1993, North Korea said that it planned to withdraw from the Nuclear Non-Proliferation Treaty (NPT) and refused to allow IAEA inspectors access to its nuclear sites. By 1994, the United States believed that North Korea had enough reprocessed plutonium to produce about 10 bombs with the amount of plutonium increasing. Faced with diplomatic pressure after UN Security Council Resolution 825 and the threat of American military air strikes against the reactor, North Korea agreed to dismantle its plutonium program as part of the Agreed Framework in which South Korea and the United States would provide North Korea with light water reactors and fuel oil until those reactors could be completed.

Because the light water reactors would require enriched uranium to be imported from outside North Korea, the amount of reactor fuel and waste could be more easily tracked, making it more difficult to divert nuclear waste to be reprocessed into plutonium. However, the Agreed Framework was mired in difficulties, with each side blaming the other for the delays in implementation; as a result, the light water reactors were never finished. In late 2002, after fuel aid was suspended, North Korea returned to using its old reactors.

In 2006, there were eight sites identified as potential test explosion sites for current (and future) tests according to a statement by the South Korean Parliament. These sites are distinguished from a number of other nuclear materials production facilities in that they are thought to be most closely identified with a military, or potentially military purpose:

1. Hamgyong Bukdo (North Hamgyong) Province – two sites:

- Chungjinsi – Nuclear fuel storage site, military base and unidentified underground facility
- Kiljugun – Extensive military buildup with motorized troop formations and construction of new advanced underground facility – Site of May 25, 2009, Nuclear Test.
- Phunggyere – Site of October 9, 2006, Nuclear Test

2. Chagangdo Province – one site: Kanggyesi – Production center of North Korea's advanced equipment and munitions since 1956. Also, extensive intelligence of advanced underground facility.

3. Pyongan Bukdo (North Pyongan) Province – four sites:

- Yongbyonsi – 2 Sites – Location of Yongbyon Nuclear Research Center, and the facility's Experimental Test Explosion facility and two unidentified underground facilities. In addition, there is a gas-graphite reactor, HE test site, nuclear fuel fabrication site, nuclear waste storage site
- Kusungsi – Between 1997 and September 2002, approximately 70 test explosions of North Korean munitions took place. Also, existence of underground facility
- Taechongun – 200MWe Nuclear Energy Plant construction site. Location of unidentified underground facility and nuclear arms/energy related facilities known to exist

4. Pyongan Namdo (South Pyongan) Province – one site: Pyongsungsi – Location of National Science Academy and extensive underground facility whose purpose is not known.

==== Highly enriched uranium program ====
North Korea possesses uranium mines containing an estimated 4 million tons of high-grade uranium ore.

Prime minister Benazir Bhutto of Pakistan allegedly, through Pakistan's former top scientist, Abdul Qadeer Khan, supplied key data, stored on CDs, on uranium enrichment and information to North Korea in exchange for missile technology around 1990–1996, according to U.S. intelligence officials. President Pervez Musharraf and Prime minister Shaukat Aziz acknowledged in 2005 that Khan had provided centrifuges and their designs to North Korea. In May 2008, Khan, who had previously confessed to supplying the data on his own initiative, retracted his confession, claiming that the Pakistan Government forced him to be a "scapegoat". He also claimed that North Korea's nuclear program was well advanced before his visits to North Korea.

North Korea's highly enriched uranium (HEU) program was publicized in October 2002 when the United States asked North Korean officials about the program. Under the Agreed Framework, North Korea explicitly agreed to freeze plutonium programs (specifically, its "graphite moderated reactors and related facilities"). The agreement also committed North Korea to implement the Joint Declaration on the Denuclearization of the Korean Peninsula, in which both Koreas committed not to have enrichment or reprocessing facilities. The United States argued North Korea violated its commitment not to have enrichment facilities.

In December 2002, claiming North Korean non-compliance, the United States persuaded the KEDO Board to suspend fuel oil shipments, which led to the end of the Agreed Framework. North Korea responded by announcing plans to reactivate a dormant nuclear fuel processing program and power plant north of Pyongyang. North Korea soon thereafter expelled United Nations inspectors and announced its withdrawal from the Non-Proliferation Treaty.

In 2007, a Bush administration official assessed that, while there was still a "high confidence" that North Korea acquired materials that could be used in a "production-scale" uranium program, there is only a "mid-confidence" level such a production-scale uranium (rather than merely plutonium) program exists.

Construction of the probable first uranium enrichment facility started in 2002 at a site known as Kangson/Chollima by US intelligence, and could have been completed and developing or operating initial gas centrifuge cascades in 2003. The facility was suspected by US intelligence for many years. The Pyongsan Uranium Mine and Concentration Plant in Pyongsan is reported to be where uranium ore is turned into yellowcake.

CNN reported on September 15, 2021, that North Korea is expanding uranium enrichment facility at Yongbyon with 1000 square meter expansion for additional 1000 centrifuges that would increase output of highly enriched uranium by up to 25% yearly and if centrifuges were to be replaced with upgraded centrifuges, increase in HEU production would be substantial according to Jeffrey Lewis, weapons expert and professor at Middlebury Institute of International Studies.

In April 2026, South Korean Unification Minister Chung Dong-young mentioned a third North Korean uranium enrichment site at Kusong in a parliamentary session. The United States subsequently suspended the sharing of satellite imagery of North Korea with the South Korean government, believing this to be a leak of US intelligence information. South Korean president Lee Jae Myung later argued the Kusong uranium facility was already known from academic and media reports.

WSJ reported analysis by VERTIC analysis on June 10, 2026 of enrichment capacity expanded by new facility at Yongbyon with estimated having around 9200 centrifuges adding onto capacity to produce additional 160 kilograms of highly enriched uranium for total of capacity of 375 kilograms a year.

=== Stockpile estimates and projections ===
==== RECNA ====
In June 2020, the Research Center for Nuclear Weapons Abolition at Nagasaki University estimated that North Korea had as many as 35 nuclear weapons in its arsenal.

==== Bulletin of the Atomic Scientists ====
As of January 8, 2018, Hans M. Kristensen and Robert S. Norris of the Federation of American Scientists published in the Bulletin of the Atomic Scientists that they "cautiously estimate that North Korea may have produced enough fissile material to build between 30 and 60 nuclear weapons and that it might possibly have assembled 10 to 20."

==== Defense Intelligence Agency ====
On August 8, 2017, the Washington Post reported recent analysis completed the previous month by the U.S. Defense Intelligence Agency which concluded that North Korea had successfully produced a miniaturized nuclear warhead that can fit in missiles and could have up to 60 nuclear warheads in its inventory.

By 2019 the DIA estimated that North Korea had accrued a stockpile of 65 weapons' worth of fissile material and that the country was producing as much as twelve weapons' worth of fissile material annually. U.S. intelligence also assessed that North Korea had built around 30 fissile material cores for use in nuclear weapons, including four-to-six two-stage thermonuclear weapons.

==== Siegfried S. Hecker ====
On August 7, 2017, Siegfried S. Hecker, former director of the Los Alamos National Laboratory who has visited North Korea nuclear facilities many times on behalf of the U.S., estimated that North Korea's stockpile of plutonium and highly enriched uranium was probably sufficient for 20 to 25 nuclear weapons. He assessed that North Korea had developed a miniaturized warhead suitable for medium-range missiles, but would need further tests and development to produce a smaller and more robust warhead suitable for an intercontinental ballistic missile (ICBM) and re-entry into the atmosphere. He considered the warhead as the least developed part of North Korea's plans for an ICBM.

In February 2019, Hecker estimated that North Korea's stockpile of weapons-grade material was sufficient for 35 to 37 nuclear weapons.

==== Institute for Science and International Security ====
For 2013, the Institute for Science and International Security gave a mid-range estimate of 12 to 27 "nuclear weapon equivalents", including plutonium and uranium stockpiles. By 2016, North Korea was projected to have 14 to 48 nuclear weapon equivalents. The estimate was dropped to 13 to 30 nuclear weapon equivalents in 2017, but was increased to as much as 60 equivalents later in August of the same year. (For uranium weapons, each weapon is assumed to contain 20 kilograms of weapons-grade uranium.) An updated estimate of the nuclear arsenal in 2023 has been made with a range of between 35 and 65 nuclear warheads in North Korean inventory.

==== FAS ====
As of 2012, the Federation of American Scientists estimated North Korea had fewer than 10 plutonium warheads.

In its "Nuclear Notebook" on North Korean nuclear capabilities, published in January 2018, FAS estimated that North Korea had sufficient fissile material for 30 to 60 nuclear weapons. However, the report stated that North Korea had assembled 10 to 20 warheads at most, with most of those warheads likely being single-stage fission weapons with yields of 10 to 20 kilotons.

In the 2024 Nuclear Notebook, FAS estimated that North Korea had produced sufficient fissile material for up to 90 nuclear weapons and that up to 50 weapons had potentially been assembled. It was estimated that North Korea was capable of adding sufficient fissile material to produce an additional six weapons annually.

==== SIPRI ====
According to the Stockholm International Peace Research Institute, North Korea maintains an active but highly opaque nuclear weapon programme. SIPRI estimates that, as of January 2024, North Korea possessed around 50 nuclear weapons, but that it probably possessed sufficient fissile material for an approximate total of up to 90 nuclear devices, depending on warhead design.

==== Korea Institute for Defense Analyses ====
In 2023, the South Korean government think tank Korea Institute for Defense Analyses published a report estimating that North Korea has between 80 and 90 nuclear warheads with up to 166 warheads by 2030 and a goal to increase to 300.

==== President Trump ====
On 20 August 2026, President Trump said North Korea had "57 very powerful nuclear weapons," consistent with but more specific than public assessments of 50-60 nuclear weapons.

==== South Korea ====
On 20 August 2026, South Korean defense minister Ahn Gyu-back said North Korea was estimated to have between 80 and 120 nuclear warheads.

== Chemical weapons ==
=== Current stockpile ===
North Korea is believed to possess various types of chemical weapons, including nerve, blister, blood, and vomiting agents.

In 2009 the International Crisis Group reported that the consensus expert view was that North Korea had a stockpile of about 2,500 to 5,000 metric tons of chemical weapons, including mustard gas, sarin (GB) and other nerve agents. The South Korean Ministry of National Defense had the same estimate in 2010. In 2014, the South Korean Defense Ministry estimated that "the North had stockpiled 2,500 to 5,000 tons of chemical weapons and had a capacity to produce a variety of biological weapons."

In 2015, the U.S. Department of Defense reported to Congress that North Korea's CW program "likely possesses a CW stockpile" and likely had "the capability to produce nerve, blister, blood, and choking agents." The report also found that "North Korea probably could employ CW agents by modifying a variety of conventional munitions, including artillery and ballistic missiles. In addition, North Korean forces are prepared to operate in a contaminated environment; they train regularly in chemical defense operations."

In 2011, this was considered the world's third largest stockpile of chemical weapons, ranking third after the United States and Russia. Russian and United States chemical weapons stockpiles were declared destroyed in 2017 and 2023 respectively.

Analysts consider at least three scenarios in which North Korea might employ chemical weapons. Either in the early phase of a ground conflict or if the regime is near defeat, it may tactically attack US-South Korean ground forces and strategically attack South Korean civilians. It may also attack United States Air Force bases in South Korea, Japan, etc., with chemically armed ballistic missiles to impede air support.

=== History ===
North Korea began to develop its own chemical industry and chemical weapon (CW) program in 1954, immediately following the end of the Korean War. However, substantial progress was not made until the 1960s, when Kim Il Sung issued a 'Declaration for Chemicalization' whose aim was to further develop an independent chemical industry capable of supporting various sectors of its economy and established North Korea's Nuclear and Chemical Defense Bureau. This has been speculated to also support chemical weapons production

In the late 1960s and early 1970s, North Korea received Soviet and Chinese aid in developing its chemical industry. In 1979, the U.S. Defense Intelligence Agency believed that North Korea "had only a defensive CW capability." It is unclear when North Korea "acquired the capability for independent CW production"; estimates range from the 1970s to early 1980s. However, by the late 1980s, North Korea's CW capabilities had expanded; the South Korean Ministry of National Defense reported in 1987 that the North "possessed up to 250 metric tons of chemical weapons" including mustard gas (a blister agent) and some nerve agents.

After the 2010 bombardment of Yeonpyeong (in which North Korea attacked Yeonpyeongdo with conventional weapons, killing a number of civilians), the National Emergency Management Agency of South Korea distributed 1,300 gas masks to South Koreans living in the western border (a flashpoint for conflict); the agency also distributed another 610,000 gas masks to members of the South Korean civil defense corps, which numbers 3.93 million. The agency also announced the renovation of underground emergency shelters. Gas masks are effective against some chemical agents, but not against blister agents such as mustard gas, lewisite, and phosgene oxime, which North Korea is thought to have in its stockpiles. In October 2013, South Korea and the United States "agreed to build a joint surveillance system to detect biochemical agents along the demilitarized zone" and to share information.

In 2017, Kim Jong-nam, the estranged elder half-brother of Kim Jong Un, was assassinated with VX nerve agent at Kuala Lumpur International Airport in Malaysia by suspected North Korean agents. A RAND Corporation report speculated that this was an intended international statement by the North Korean government, during the 2017–2018 North Korea crisis, that it possesses sub-nuclear options including advanced chemical weapons such as VX.

=== Diplomacy ===
In 1988, North Korea became a party with a reservation to the 1925 Geneva Protocol, which prohibits the use of chemical and biological weapons in international warfare. It did so with the common reservation option that it would cease to be bound against states and their allies not observing the protocol. This means if a state initiates "first use" of chemical or biological weapons, North Korea would consider itself legally able to begin "second use" chemical and biological attacks. This is despite the fact that chemical and biological warfare is considered illegal under customary international humanitarian law.

North Korea is not a party to the 1993 Chemical Weapons Convention (CWC). It is one of four countries that have not ratified the CWC (the others are Israel, Egypt, and South Sudan).

North Korea has refused to acknowledge possessing chemical weapons, as called for by United Nations Security Council Resolution 1718, passed in 2006.

== Biological weapons ==
=== Current stockpile ===
It is unclear if North Korea is currently operating a biological weapons program. Little is known in comparison to the country's nuclear and missile programs as biological weapons infrastructure is commonly dual-use and easy to hide among legitimate industry. Anthrax and smallpox are most commonly suggested as possible biological agents North Korea may have researched.

=== Intelligence assessments ===
Since 2014, the United States Intelligence Community's unclassified assessments of biological weapons do not include North Korea as a suspect program. South Korean government reports in 2016 stated "sources indicate that North Korea is capable of cultivating and producing various types of biological agents", although this is true of many countries with a similar general level of industry. In 2012, South Korean government reports described a North Korean biological weapons as a "likely capability".

In 2015, the U.S. Department of Defense reported that North Korea "continues to develop its biological research and development capabilities" and "may consider the use of biological weapons as an option, contrary to its obligations under the Biological and Toxins Weapons Convention."

=== Defector reports ===
North Korean defectors and South Korean reports suggested North Korean scientists have researched North Korea anthrax, smallpox, cholera, and viral hemorrhagic fevers. Defector reports have been criticized for not being possible to corroborate or later being proven false. Some defectors have been vaccinated for anthrax and smallpox, although analysts do not find this conclusive of an offensive program.

=== Pyongyang Bio-technical Institute visit ===
In 2015, Melissa Hanham of the James Martin Center for Nonproliferation Studies released an analysis of a photograph of supreme leader Kim Jong Un visiting the Pyongyang Bio-technical Institute, a factory supposedly for the production of Bacillus thuringiensis of use in pesticides. Hanham concluded that the factory actually produces weaponized anthrax, and noted that pesticide production factories are "an old and well-used cover for a biological weapons program". A number of other experts agreed that "the photos most likely show an operational biological weapons facility", while a RAND Corporation report found them inconclusive, but suggested the visit may have been to signal a biological weapons capability following the US claiming it accidentally sent a live anthrax culture to Osan Air Base in South Korea. The North Korean government denied the allegations; an official spokesperson for the National Defence Commission, through the official Korean Central News Agency, challenged the U.S. Congress to inspect the Institute and "behold the awe-inspiring sight of the Pyongyang Bio-technical Institute."

=== Diplomacy ===
North Korea is a party to the Biological Weapons Convention (BWC). Although the nation has signed the BWC, it "has failed to provide a BWC Confidence-Building Measure declaration since 1990."

In 1988, North Korea became a party with a reservation to the 1925 Geneva Protocol, which prohibits the use of chemical and biological weapons in international warfare. It did so with the common reservation option that it would cease to be bound against states and their allies not observing the protocol. This means if a state initiates "first use" of chemical or biological weapons, North Korea would consider itself legally able to begin "second use" chemical and biological attacks. This is despite the fact that chemical and biological warfare is considered illegal under customary international humanitarian law.

=== Allegations of biological warfare during the Korean War ===
Allegations that the United States military used biological weapons in the Korean War (June 1950 – July 1953) were raised by the governments of the People's Republic of China, the Soviet Union, and North Korea. China and North Korea also made allegations that US forces used chemical weapons. Subsequent scholars are split about the truth of the claims.

The claims were first raised in 1951, and claimed the use of anti-personnel, anti-crop, and anti-animal pathogens, including the causative agents of anthrax, plague, smallpox, and typhoid fever. The story was covered by the worldwide press and led to a highly publicized international investigation in 1952. Secretary of State Dean Acheson and other American and allied government officials denounced the allegations as a hoax. The United States biological weapons program operated from 1942 to 1973. Following the surrender of Japan, the US military conducted a cover-up of the Japanese biological warfare program.

== Delivery systems ==
The Korean People's Army Strategic Force, founded in 2012, operates surface-to-surface missiles in nuclear and non-nuclear roles. Modern examples include ballistic missiles such as the intercontinental-range Hwasong-17, intermediate-range Hwasong-12, medium-range Hwasong-9, and short-range Hwasong-11D. In addition, the Strategic Force operates the Hwasal-1 and Hwasal-2 land-attack cruise missiles, and the country is developing submarine-launched missiles including for the Hero Kim Kun Ok submarine.

=== History ===
In the late 1970s or early 1980s, the DPRK received several longer range Scud-B missiles from Egypt (which in turn received those missiles from the USSR, Bulgaria and Poland). The USSR had refused to supply Scuds directly to North Korea, but North Korea, starting in the 1970s, has produced missiles based on its design: a local production basis was established, and the first modified copy was named Hwasong-5. With time, more advanced types of missiles were developed. Eventually North Korea equipped itself with ballistic missiles, capable of reaching Japan. In the 1990s, North Korea sold medium-sized nuclear capable missiles to Pakistan in a deal facilitated by China.

North Korea's ability to deliver weapons of mass destruction to a hypothetical target is somewhat limited by its missile technology. In 2005, North Korea's total range with its Hwasong-7 (Nodong) missiles was estimated as 900 km with a 1,000 kg payload. That is enough to reach South Korea, and parts of Japan, Russia, and China. The Hwasong-10 is a North Korean designed intermediate-range ballistic missile with range capabilities of up to 2,490 km (1,550 mi), and could carry a nuclear warhead.

In an online interview published in 2006, the Japanese Ministry of Defense's analyst Hideshi Takesada argued that North Korea's desire of unification is similar to North Vietnam, and warned of the possibility of North Korea's compulsory merger with South Korea by threats of nuclear weapons, taking advantage of any possible decrease in the U.S. military presence in South Korea, after North Korea deploys several hundred mobile ICBMs aimed at the United States. In 2016, Israeli analyst Uzi Rubin said that the missile program had demonstrated "remarkable achievements".

Report on North Korea by United Nations Panel of Experts with information disclosed by various member countries that the status of its ballistic missile program as comprehensive and autonomous with guidance system being indigenous, demonstrated by recent test of a short range ballistic missile similar to Iskander and demonstrating depressed trajectory as such.

In January 2020, Vice Chairman of the Joint Chiefs of Staff John E. Hyten said "North Korea is building new missiles, new capabilities, new weapons as fast as anybody on the planet."

On October 19, 2021, North Korea launched a ballistic missile that landed in the Sea of Japan. Japan's prime minister Fumio Kishida called the launch "very regrettable".

The French think tank Foundation for Strategic Research released a report analyzing North Korean nuclear arsenal and ballistic missiles. It estimated the accuracy of short range ballistic missiles such as Hwasong-11A (KN-23) and Hwasong-11B (KN-24) to be 35 meters based on satellite imagery and the distance between impact craters from missile tests, and 80–90 meters for the KN-25 large diameter guided rocket.

The Congressional Research Service issued a report citing a 2017 assessment by the Defense Intelligence Agency that North Korea has achieved a level of miniatuarization of nuclear warheads needed to mount them on short range and intercontinental ballistic missiles. CRS assessed that the Hwasong-11A (KN-23) SRBM, which can target the entire Korean peninsula, and the Pukguksong-2 (KN-15) MRBM, which can target all of Japan, can carry both conventional and nuclear warheads.

In August 2024, the country began deploying 250 new tactical ballistic missile launchers near its border with South Korea, escalating regional tensions. North Korean leader Kim Jong-un emphasized their role in a potential confrontation with the US. This move comes ahead of the annual US-South Korea military exercise, which North Korea condemns as invasion rehearsals.

North Korea rejected UN criticism of its October 2024 ICBM launch, with Kim Yo Jong asserting the country's right to self-defense. South Korea responded with sanctions and a joint drone drill with the US, while the UN Security Council planned to address missile activity amid regional tensions.

=== Operational delivery systems ===
Estimated maximum range of some North Korean missiles

There is evidence that North Korea has been able to miniaturize a nuclear warhead for use on a ballistic missile. According to Japan's defense white paper North Korea does possess the ability to miniaturize nuclear weapons. A defense white paper from South Korea in 2018 said North Korea's ability to miniaturize nuclear weapons has reached a considerable level. In a leaked report the American Defense Intelligence Agency also claims North Korea can miniaturize nuclear warheads for ballistic missiles. Whether North Korea has technology to protect their missiles upon re-entry is unknown. Some analysts suggest North Korea's new missiles are fakes. Various North Korean rocket tests continued into the 2010s, for example in 2013, in 2014, and in 2016. North Korea performed no tests of medium-range missiles sufficiently powerful to reach Japan in 2015, but South Korea's Yonhap news agency believes that at least one missile fired during North Korea's March 2016 missile tests is likely a medium-range Rodong missile. An August 2016 North Korean missile test of a Rodong missile that flew 1,000 kilometres (620 mi) landed about 250 kilometres (160 mi) west of Japan's Oga Peninsula, in international waters but inside Japan's exclusive economic zone, prompting Japan to condemn the "unforgivable act of violence toward Japan's security".

As of 2016, North Korea is known to have approximately 300 Rodong missiles whose maximum range is 1,300 km (800 mi).

North Korea appeared to launch a missile test from a submarine on April 23, 2016; while the missile only traveled 30 km, one U.S. analyst noted that "North Korea's sub launch capability has gone from a joke to something very serious". However, as of 2023, there appears to be slow progress developing SLBMs, possibly as development was lowered in priority given the good progress with substantially more survivable land-mobile missiles.

The U.S. is sanctioning six individuals and five entities in China for supporting North Korea's WMD and ballistic missile programs. This network aided a DPRK representative linked to the Second Academy of Natural Sciences. The U.S. aims to disrupt these networks to counter regional destabilization and Russia's actions in Ukraine.

==== Operational or successfully tested ====
- Hwasong-5 – initial Scud modification. Road-mobile, liquid-fueled missile, with an estimated range of 330 km. It has been tested successfully. It is believed that North Korea has deployed some 150–200 such missiles on mobile launchers.
- Hwasong-6 – later Scud modification. Similar to the Hwasong-5, yet with an increased range (550–700 km) and a smaller warhead (600–750 kg). Apparently this is the most widely deployed North Korean missile, with at least 400 missiles in use.
- Hwasong-7 – Also known as Nodong or Rodong-1, larger and more advanced Scud modification. Liquid-fueled, road-mobile missile with a 650 kg warhead. First production variants had inertial guidance, later variants featured GPS guidance, which improves CEP accuracy to 190–250 m. Range is estimated to be between 1,300 and 1,600 km.
- Hwasong-9 – The Hwasong-9, also known as Scud-ER, is a further development of Hwasong-6 with a range of (1000–1000+ km) and is capable of hitting Japan.
- Hwasong-10 – believed to be a modified copy of the Soviet R-27 Zyb SLBM. Originally believed to have been tested as the first or second stage of Unha, but debris analysis showed that the Unha used older technology than it is believed the Hwasong-10 uses. Also known under the names Nodong-B, Taepodong-X, Musudan and BM25, predicted to have a range of 2,500–4,000 km. A DoD report puts BM25 strength at fewer than 50 launchers.
- Hwasong-11 – Also known as KN-02, a short-range, solid-fueled, highly accurate mobile missile, modified copy of the Soviet OTR-21. Unknown number in service, apparently deployed either in the late 1990s or early 2000s (decade).
- Hwasong-11A – Also known as KN-23. 700 km range, Successfully tested on May 4, 2019. Similar to 9K720 Iskander. Demonstrated range of 800 kilometers on September 15, 2021.
- Hwasong-12 – a medium-range, liquid-fueled, mobile missile. First tested in May 2017. also known as KN-17 outside of Korea, South Korean experts estimate range of 5000 to 6000 km based on successful test conducted in May.
- Hwasong-14 – Also known as the KN-20, a long-range, road transportable ICBM, tested on July 4 and 29, 2017, estimated range is 6,700–10,000 km (4,200–6,200 mi) John Schilling estimates the current accuracy of the North's Hwasong-14 as poor at the mooted ranges which threaten US cities (which would require more testing to prove its accuracy). Michael Elleman has pointed out that the NHK video which captured the descent of the reentry vehicle (RV) shows its failure to survive reentry. If the RV had survived reentry, the video would have shown a bright image all the way to impact in the sea. However a recent CIA assessment notes that North Korea's ICBM reentry vehicles would likely perform adequately if flown on a normal trajectory to continental U.S. targets.
- Hwasong-15 – 13,000 km range, successfully tested on November 28, 2017.
- Hwasong-17 – potential range over 15,000 km depending on the warhead weight, according to initial Japanese estimate. The ICBM was believed to have first successfully tested on a full flight on November 18, 2022. The ICBM's long-range accuracy, and its ability to survive re-entry, are unknown as of 2022.
- Pukguksong-1 – a long-range, solid-fueled, SLBM. Also called the KN-11 by the Defense Department. Possibly derived from the Chinese JL-1 SLBM.
- Pukguksong-2 – a long-range, land based development of the solid fueled Pukguksong-1. Also known as KN-15.

==== Untested ====
- Hwasong-13 – Road-mobile ICBM. Also known as KN-08. Maximum range more than 5,500 km (3,400 miles). The US Defense Department estimates at least 6 Hwasong-13 (KN-08) launchers are in deployment. A modified version, called KN-14 under the U.S. naming convention, was unveiled at a parade marking the 70th anniversary of the Workers' Party of Korea. The missile development was halted due to engine problems.

== Exports related to ballistic missile technology ==
In April 2009, the United Nations named the Korea Mining and Development Trading Corporation (KOMID) as North Korea's primary arms dealer and main exporter of equipment related to ballistic missiles and conventional weapons. The UN lists KOMID as being based in the Central District, Pyongyang. However, it also has offices in Beijing and sales offices worldwide which facilitate weapons sales and seek new customers for North Korean weapons.

KOMID has sold missile technology to Iran and has done deals for missile related technology with the Taiwanese. KOMID has also been responsible for the sale of equipment, including missile technologies, gunboats, and multiple rocket artilleries, worth a total of over $100 million, to Africa, South America, and the Middle East.

North Korea's military has also used a company called Hap Heng to sell weapons overseas. Hap Heng was based in Macau in the 1990s to handle sales of weapons and missiles and nuclear technology to nations such as Pakistan and Iran. Pakistan's medium-range ballistic missile, the Ghauri, is considered to be a copy of North Korea's Rodong 1. In 1999, intelligence sources claimed that North Korea had sold missile components to Iran. Listed directors of Hap Heng include Kim Song in and Ko Myong Hun. Ko Myong Hun is now a listed diplomat in Beijing and may be involved in the work of KOMID.

A UN Security Council sanctions committee report stated that North Korea operates an international smuggling network for nuclear and ballistic missile technology, including to Myanmar (Burma), Syria, and Iran.

=== Export partners ===
Several countries have bought North Korean ballistic missiles or have received assistance from North Korea to establish local missile production.

Egypt
Egypt has received technologies and assistance for manufacture of both the Hwasong-5 and Hwasong-6, and may have provided guidance systems or information on longer-range missiles to North Korea from the Condor/Badr program.
Iran
Iran was one of the first countries to buy North Korean missiles. Iran has established local production for the Hwasong-5 (Shahab-1), Hwasong-6 (Shahab-2) and the Rodong-1 (Shahab-3). Iran also possesses 19 land-based BM25 Musudan missiles, according to a leaked, classified U.S. State Department cable, Iran designated the Musudan as Khorramshahr. This nuclear-capable missile is currently under development and has failed its two known flight tests.
Pakistan
North Korean entities continued to provide assistance to Pakistan's ballistic missile program during the first half of 1999 in return for nuclear weapons technology. Such assistance was critical to Islamabad's efforts to produce ballistic missiles. In April 1998, Pakistan flight-tested the Ghauri MRBM, which is based on North Korea's Nodong missile. Also in April 1998, the United States imposed sanctions against Pakistani and North Korean entities for their role in transferring Missile Technology Control Regime Category I ballistic missile-related technology.
Syria
Syria originally obtained the Scud-B from North Korea. North Korea may have assisted Syria in development of the Scud-C and/or the Scud-D. As of 2013, Syria relies on foreign assistance from multiple countries, including North Korea, for advanced missile components and technologies. In 2018, a United Nations report alleged that North Korea had been sending technicians and material to Syria to assist in its chemical weapons program, including acid-resistant tiles, valves, and thermometers.
United Arab Emirates
25 Hwasong-5s were purchased from North Korea in 1989. The UAE Union Defence Force were not satisfied with the quality of the missiles, and they were kept in storage.
Vietnam
Vietnam reportedly ordered Hwasong-5/6 missiles in 1998–99, but it is unclear if this deal was fulfilled.
Yemen
Yemen is known to have bought Scud missiles from North Korea in the 1990s—a total of 15 missiles, conventional warheads and fuel oxidizer.

==== Former export partners ====
Libya
Libya during the rule of Muammar Gaddafi had been known to receive technological assistance, blueprints and missile parts from North Korea.

==== Rejection by a potential export partner ====
Nigeria
In January 2004, the Nigerian government announced that North Korea had agreed to sell its missile technology, but a month later Nigeria rejected the agreement under U.S. pressure.

== International responses ==
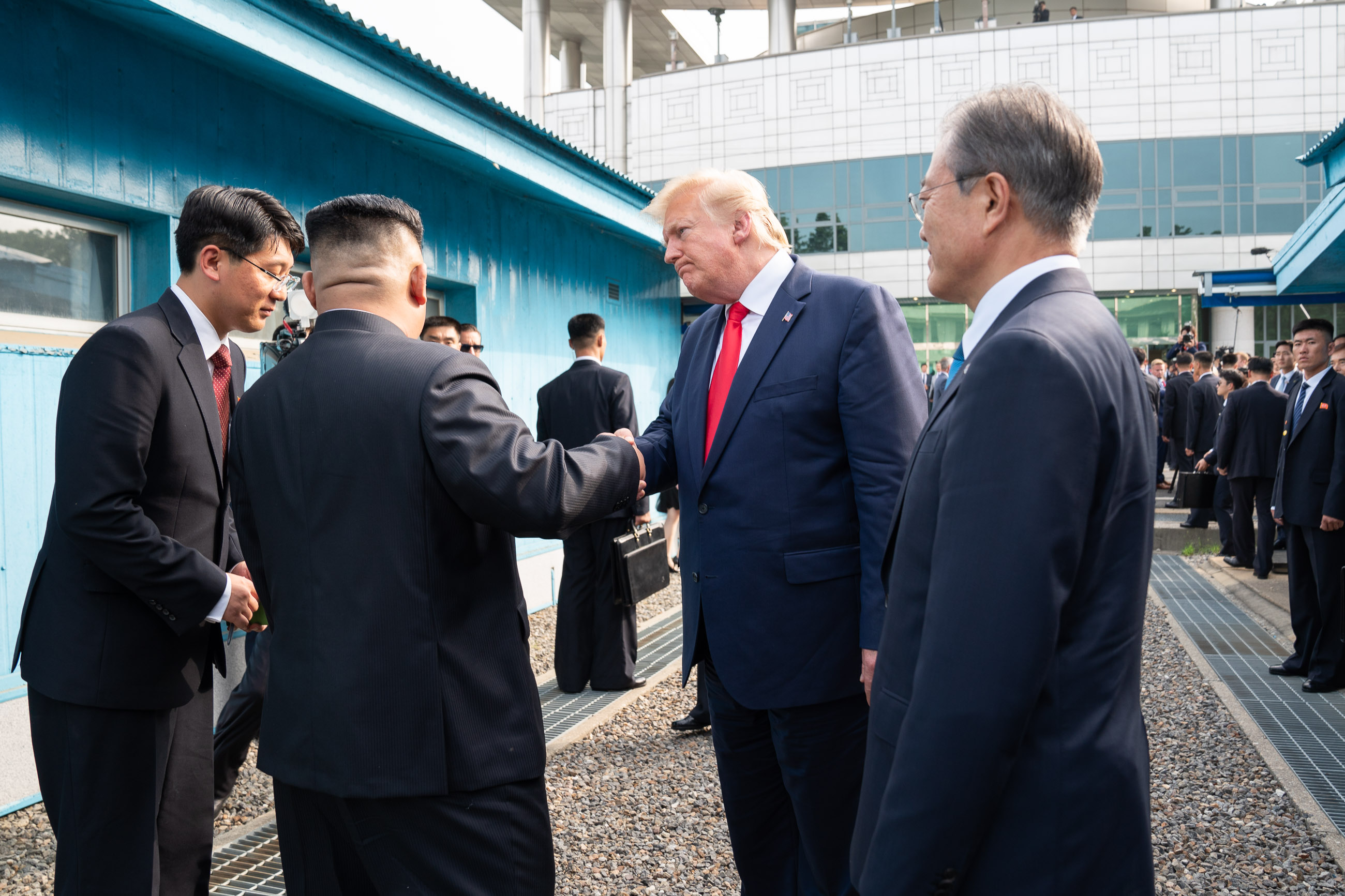
U.S. President Donald Trump, North Korean Chairman Kim Jong Un, and South Korean President Moon Jae-in in the demilitarized zone in 2019

In the 1990s, the United States negotiated the Agreed Framework to freeze North Korea's nuclear weapons program while pursuing the denuclearization of the Korean peninsula. This broke down when North Korea's clandestine uranium enrichment program came to light in 2002, after which China convened the six-party talks to negotiate a step-by-step process to denuclearization. The six-party talks stalled after multiple North Korean nuclear and missile tests, leading to increased international Sanctions against North Korea, including a series of sanctions resolutions imposed by the United Nations Security Council. In 2018, Presidents Moon Jae-in of South Korea and Donald Trump of the United States held a series of summits with Kim Jong Un which led to declarations in favor of the denuclearization of the Korean peninsula.

Russia's position regarding North Korea's nuclear program changed after the 2022 invasion of Ukraine. North Korea began supplying Russia with artillery and ballistic missiles in 2023 to support that invasion. In September 2024, Russian Foreign Minister Sergey Lavrov said that Russia viewed the notion of denuclearizing North Korea as a "closed issue", saying that Russia understood North Korea's logic of relying on nuclear weapons against the United States. In October 2024, North Korea began sending troops to fight with Russia against Ukraine. In July 2025, Lavrov said that Russia "respect[s] North Korea’s aspirations and understand[s] the reasons why it is pursuing nuclear development". In December 2025, China omitted mentioning "denuclearization of the Korean peninsula" in its white paper on China's arms control, instead stating that China calls on countries to "desist from an approach based on aggressive deterrence and coercion, restart dialogue and negotiations, and play a constructive role in resolving the Korean peninsula issue through political means and realizing lasting peace and stability in the peninsula".

== International inspections ==
On October 31, 2018, lawmaker Kim Min-ki of South Korea's ruling Democratic Party of Korea issued a statement revealing that officials from South Korea's National Intelligence Service had observed several of North Korea's nuclear and missile test sites and that they were now ready for the upcoming international inspections. Kim also stated that the now inactive North Korean Punggye-ri Nuclear Test Site and the Sohae Satellite launching ground were included in these observations. The visit by the intelligence officials was in tandem with the September 2018 Pyongyang Agreement, which saw North Korean leader Kim Jung-Un agree to close Sohae and allow international experts to observe the dismantling of the missile engine testing site and a launch pad. The international experts will also be allowed to witness the dismantling of other North Korean nuclear and missile test sites as well. Yongbyon, the main nuclear facility in North Korea, has also been inactive during the past year as well, but has not yet been completely closed.

== See also ==
- Hagap Underground Facility
- Korean conflict
- Korean reunification
- List of nuclear weapons tests of North Korea
- North Korea–Pakistan relations
- North Korea–United States relations
- Nuclear power in North Korea
- Sohae Satellite Launching Station
- South Korea and weapons of mass destruction
