= Vancouver group =

Vancouver Group or Vancouver group may refer to:

- Vancouver School, Canadian photographers
- International Committee of Medical Journal Editors, formerly known as Vancouver Group
- A group of 18 countries that "seek to further increase pressure on North Korea to come to the table to negotiate an end to its nuclear program," whose first summit was held in Vancouver on 16 January 2018. The Vancouver Group of 18 countries includes:
  The United States, the UK, Canada, Australia, Turkey, New Zealand, the Philippines, Thailand, France, Ethiopia, Greece, Colombia, Belgium, South Africa, the Netherlands, and Luxembourg.
