= KN-25 =

600 mm multiple rocket launcher (KN-25)
- Type: Multiple rocket launcher (North Korea claimed); Short-range ballistic missile (South Korea, US claimed)

Service history
- In service: 2020–present
- Used by: North Korea

Production history
- Designed: 2019
- Manufacturer: Kanggye Tractor Factory (rocket); March 16 Factory, Pyongsong (launcher)
- Produced: 2019–present

Specifications
- Mass: 3,000 kg (6,600 lb)
- Length: 8.2 m (27 ft)
- Diameter: 600 mm (24 in)
- Warhead: 300–500 kg (660–1,100 lb) fragmentation warhead Hwasan-31
- Operational range: 380–400 km (240–250 mi)
- Guidance system: Possibly inertial with satellite
- Accuracy: 80–90 m (260–300 ft)
- Launch platform: Wheeled or tracked vehicle with four to six tubes

The 600 mm multiple rocket launcher (Korean: 600㎜방사포), widely known outside North Korea by its United States designation KN-25, (Note: South Korea also refers to KN-25 as 19-5 SRBM under its naming convention.) is a weapon system that is referred to by North Korean state media as multiple rocket launcher, and by South Korea and the United States as short-range ballistic missile.

== Description ==
Images of the KN-25
- Salvo launch
- KN-25's wheeled, four-tube launcher
- KN-25's wheeled, five-tube launcher
- KN-25's wheeled, six-tube launcher
- KN-25's tracked, six-tube launcher

The KN-25 is developed as a hybrid weapon system between short-range ballistic missile (SRBM) and traditional multiple rocket launcher (MRL). Officially described as a "super-large" MRL; however, KN-25 has characteristics of a ballistic missile. Because of its larger size and greater range compared to traditional rocket artillery, the United States Forces Korea (USFK) categorizes it as a SRBM. It flies on a controlled ballistic trajectory. Missiles are estimated to be 600 mm (24 in) in diameter, 8.2 m (27 ft) long, and weigh 3,000 kg (6,600 lb). They have an unspecified guidance system and have six rotating rear fins, with four moving forward fins, which likely provide the attitude control of the rocket.

They are mounted on multiple types of launcher, including a six-tube, tracked transporter-erector-launcher (TEL) with 10 road wheels on each side, a four-tube Tatra 813 8×8 wheeled launcher, a four-axle, road-mobile launcher carrying five tubes, or a wheeled TEL with six launch tubes.

It is a battlefield weapon, suitable for deployment at battalion-level, to attack enemy rear-echelon targets and infrastructures, such as airfield and command center, out to 380–400 km (240–250 mi) with a conventional blast-fragmentation warhead, weighing 300–500 kg (660–1,100 lb). In October 2022, the KN-25 was included in a statement among other missiles that North Korea claimed were part of its capability to deliver tactical nuclear weapons. At a military parade in February 2023, the KN-25 was included among other missiles which the North Korean press collectively referred to these as "tactical nuclear weapons operation units." In March 2023, North Korea confirmed that KN-25 can be equipped with the Hwasan-31 nuclear warhead.

The six rotating rear fins are an unusual feature for rocket artillery, a considerable innovation of North Korea. Their purpose is to provide stabilisation of the rocket while in flight, compared to other rocket artillery rounds, which are usually spin stabilised by rotating the entire body. This method of stabilisation creates a more favourable environment for the guidance systems, as the rest of the missile does not rotate. There are additional four fins at the nose cone for direction control. It is possible that the missile will be stabilised through rolling the missile when it enters the upper atmosphere, where the smaller control fins are unable to function optimally, and then stopping the spin as it re-enters into denser air. It has a circular error probable accuracy of 80–90 m (260–300 ft).

The missile possibly derives from the OTR-21 Tochka/Hwasong-11 (KN-02), which has a similarly sized motor, at 62 cm diameter. Connecting three such motor segments would result in a length similar to the KN-25 rocket. The KN-25 is likely an indigenous project, as media coverage of this missile emphasises its research, using words such as "Juche projectiles" to describe it, unlike the Hwasong-11A (KN-23).

According to North Korean leader Kim Jong Un, KN-25 incorporates artificial intelligence (AI) technology. However, it is possible that the AI incorporation mentioned by North Korea may refer to production, rather than guidance.

=== Mass production ===
KN-25 launchers are manufactured at the March 16 Factory in Pyongsong, while the 600 mm-diameter rockets are assembled in Kanggye Tractor Factory.

On 1 January 2023, 30 TELs were presented as a gift to the plenary meeting of the Worker's Party of Korea, with Kim Jong Un attending and making a speech. The system was described as "unprecedented", in both the munitions industry as having no equal and its presentation, being on the lawn of the party central committee. 30 six-tube tracked launchers plus at least 9 four-tube wheeled launchers publicly showcased in North Korea's possession, would give them the ability to fire up to 216 rockets, requiring many fewer launch vehicles than would be needed to fire a similar number of traditional ballistic missiles, to saturate South Korean ballistic missile defenses.

In May 2025, it was revealed that KN-25's tracked launcher has undergone mass production.

A batch of 50 five-tube launchers of KN-25 was transferred to the Korean People's Army during a ceremony held on 18 February 2026, with Kim Jong Un attending. A month later, South Korea's Defense Intelligence Agency estimated that 80 KN-25 launchers had been produced.

=== Cruise missile launcher ===
On 13 September 2021, North Korea announced they had conducted successful flight tests of a land-attack cruise missile (LACM) over the past two days. The mobile launcher appears to be the same vehicle used to carry KN-25 "oversized" rockets, both weapons likely being similar in diameter. The cruise missile could carry a conventional or nuclear warhead. It is claimed to have a range of 1,500 km (930 mi). It was later revealed that the cruise missile is officially named Hwasal-1.

== List of KN-25 launches ==
Attempt	Date (Pyongyang Standard Time)	Location	Number of missiles tested	Apogee	Range	Additional notes	Reference(s)
1	31 July 2019	Possibly Wonsan	2	30 km (19 mi)	250 km (160 mi)	First test-fire of KN-25, with a 21-minute firing interval and Kim Jong Un supervision. North Korea termed KN-25 a "new type large-caliber multiple launch guided rocket system", but projectiles were dubious as what South Korean military tracked were ballistic missiles.	
2	2 August 2019	Yonghung (reported)	2	25 km (16 mi)	220 km (140 mi)	24-minute firing interval; tracked chassis was used. Kim Jong Un oversaw the launch.	
3	24 August 2019	Sondok Airport	2	97 km (60 mi)	380 km (240 mi)	17-minute firing interval.	
4	10 September 2019	Kaechon Airport	3	50 km (31 mi)	330 km (210 mi)	The first two rockets were launched with a 19-minute firing interval between tests. The third rocket possibly failed to properly launch.	
5	31 October 2019	Sunchon Airport	2	90 km (56 mi)	370 km (230 mi)	3-minute firing interval.	
6	28 November 2019	Yonpo Airfield	2	97 km (60 mi)	380 km (240 mi)	30-second firing interval.	
7	2 March 2020	Anbyon County, Kangwon Province	2	35 km (22 mi)	240 km (150 mi)	The missiles, fired for only 20 seconds, were launched with a 20-second firing interval. Kim Jong Un oversaw the test.	
8	8 March 2020	Sondok, South Hamgyong Province	3	50 km (31 mi)	200 km (120 mi)	North Korea also launched smaller MLRS missiles to accompany KN-25. According to South Korea, the launch may be a part of an ongoing artillery drill that involved multiple rocket launchers.	
9	29 March 2020	Hodo Peninsula, Kangwon Province	2	30 km (19 mi)	230 km (140 mi)	The two rockets were launched with a 20-second firing interval between tests. The launch was to verify the specifications of KN-25 before delivering to the Korean People's Army.	
10	29 September 2022	Sunchon, North Pyongan Province	2	50 km (31 mi)	350 km (220 mi)	North Korea released information on 10 October 2022.	
11	5 October 2022	Samsok District, Pyongyang	1	100 km (62 mi)	350 km (220 mi)	North Korea released information on 10 October 2022. A Hwasong-11A missile was launched about 15 minutes after the launch.	
12	8 October 2022	Munchon, Kangwon Province	2	90 km (56 mi)	350 km (220 mi)	North Korea released information on 10 October 2022. The rockets were launched with a 6-minute firing interval between tests.	
13	3 November 2022	Unknown	2	50 km (31 mi)	350 km (220 mi)	North Korea released information on 7 November 2022.	
14	5 November 2022	Unknown	2	Unknown	Unknown	North Korea released information on 7 November 2022.	
15	31 December 2022	Chunghwa County, North Hwanghae Province	3	100 km (62 mi)	350 km (220 mi)	North Korea's Second Economic Commission fired the rockets. The launch was to assess its combat capability.	
16	1 January 2023	Ryongsong, Pyongyang	1	Unknown	Unknown	The rocket was fired by a long-range artillery sub-unit of the Korean People's Army.	
17	20 February 2023	Sukchon, South Pyongan Province	2	50–100 km (31–62 mi)	350–400 km (220–250 mi)	The rockets were fired by a long-range artillery sub-unit of the Korean People's Army.	
18	18 March 2024	Samsok District, Pyongyang	6	50 km (31 mi)	350 km (220 mi)	There were two heats of firing, each heat had three rockets. The second heat was fired after a 53-minute interval. Kim Jong Un oversaw the test.	
19	22 April 2024	Samsok District, Pyongyang	4	50 km (31 mi)	250 km (160 mi)	Kim Jong Un guided the test.	
20	30 May 2024	Pyongyang International Airport	18	100 km (62 mi)	365 km (227 mi)	Kim Jong Un guided the test. According to the Korean Central News Agency, these missiles hit the target 365 km (227 mi) away. United States condemned the launch.	
21	12 September 2024	Chunghwa County, North Hwanghae Province	3	100 km (62 mi)	350 km (220 mi)	Kim Jong Un oversaw the launch. North Korea claimed the revelation of "new-type 600mm multiple rocket launcher", with images showing the launch of KN-25 missiles from a new wheeled launcher with six launch tubes.	
22	8 May 2025	Wonsan	5 to 8	Unknown	Unknown	Kim Jong Un oversaw the test. North Korea also fired at least one Hwasong-11A missile in the test.	
23	27 January 2026	Northern Pyongyang	4	80 km (50 mi)	358.5 km (222.8 mi)	Kim Jong Un oversaw the launch along with his daughter. According to North Korean state media, the DPRK Missile Administration-organized launch was to verify the effectiveness, mobility and accuracy of an "upgraded" large-caliber MRL system. However, Japanese data showed only two missiles were launched and achieved a maximum apogee of 80 km (50 mi).	
24	14 March 2026	Pyongyang International Airport	12	Unknown	364.4 km (226.4 mi)	Kim Jong Un oversaw the launch along with his daughter.	
25	12 September 2026	South of Wonsan	At least 5	Unknown	250 km (160 mi)	The KN-25 launch was the part of a broader attack drill involving Hwasong-11A, Hwasal cruise missiles and attack drones. Images appear to show five KN-25 TELs firing one after another. North Korea referred to KN-25 as "large-caliber thermal-pressure multiple rocket launcher", while delaying the coverage to two days after the drill.	
26	29 October 2026	Wonsan	15 (10 claimed by South Korea; 15 confirmed via North Korean released photos)	Unknown	250 km (160 mi)	This KN-25 launch involved a battalion and was opened to the public for the first time as a part of a military exhibition. In this test, the KN-25 system was dubbed "Sniper".	

== See also ==
- KN-02
- KN-09
