= Pulhwasal-3-31 =

North Korean submarine-launched cruise missile

- Type: Submarine-launched cruise missile
- Place of origin: North Korea

Service history
- In service: 2024–present
- Used by: Korean People's Navy; DPRK Missile Administration

Production history
- Manufacturer: North Korea

Specifications
- Warhead: Tactical nuclear weapons
- Operational range: 2,000 km (1,200 mi)
- Launch platform: Submarine

The Pulhwasal-3-31 (Korean: 《불화살-3-31》형; lit. 'Fire Arrow Type 3-31') is a North Korean submarine-launched cruise missile.

== Description ==
Images of the Pulhwasal-3-31
- Launch of the missile

Based on images released by North Korea, Pulhwasal-3-31 appears to be a long-range, land-attack cruise missile for attacking fixed targets on the ground. It is similar to Russia's Kalibr or United States's Tomahawk. It is possible that Pulhwasal-3-31 is a variant or an updated version of the Hwasal-1 and Hwasal-2 cruise missiles.

According to North Korea, it is a "strategic" cruise missile. As the missile's name contains number 31, it is highly likely that Pulhwasal-3-31 is able to carry the Hwasan-31 tactical nuclear warhead. It may also have a version armed with a conventional warhead.

It is capable of flying for more than two hours. Its assumed range is 2,000 km (1,200 mi); however, the reported flight times of the second launch, revealed to be between 7,421 and 7,445 seconds, were consistent with a range of 1,500 km (930 mi).

It is possible that Pulhwasal-3-31 is designed to have other basing modes along with submarines.

The Pulhwasal-3-31 uses a complicated naming scheme, similar to Haeil-5-23. It is used to give an impression that North Korea has developed new weapons.

== List of tests ==
Attempt	Date	Location	Number of missiles tested	Outcome	Additional notes	References
1	24 January 2024	North Korea’s west coast	"Several" (South Korea)	Success	First test-fire of Pulhwasal-3-31. According to North Korea, it is "under development". South Korea detected the launch of several cruise missiles toward North Korea's western sea at 7 a.m. local time.	
2	28 January 2024	Near Sinpo	2 (North Korea) "Several" (South Korea)	Success	These missiles flew for over 7,400 seconds. Kim Jong Un oversaw the test.	

== See also ==
- Hwasal-2
- Kalibr
- Babur III
- Tomahawk
- Haeseong III
