= Samsok-guyok =

District of Pyongyang, North Korea

Samsŏk-guyŏk 삼석구역
- Guyŏk of Pyongyang

Korean transcription(s)
  - Hanja: 三石區域
  - McCune-Reischauer: Samsŏk-kuyŏk
  - Revised Romanization: Samseok-guyeok
- Location of Samsok-guyok within Pyongyang
- Coordinates: 39°08′20″N 125°55′50″E
- Country: North Korea
- Direct-administered city: P'yŏngyang-Chikhalsi

Area
  - Total: 160.1 km^{2} (61.8 sq mi)

Population (2008)
  - Total: 62,790
  - Density: 392.2/km^{2} (1,016/sq mi)

- Samsŏk-kuyŏk
- Chosŏn'gŭl: 삼석구역
- Hancha: 三石區域
- Revised Romanization: Samseok-guyeok
- McCune–Reischauer: Samsŏk-kuyŏk

Samsŏk-kuyŏk, or Samsŏk District is one of the 19 guyok which constitute the city of Pyongyang, North Korea.

== Administrative divisions ==
Samsŏk-kuyŏk is divided into 4 dong (neighbourhoods) and 7 ri (villages):

- Changsuwŏn-dong 장수원동 (長水院洞)
- Mun'yŏng-dong 문영동 (文榮洞)
- Sŏngmun 1-dong 성문 1동 (聖文 1洞)
- Sŏngmun 2-dong 성문 2동 (聖文 2洞)
- Honam-ri 호남리 (湖南里)
- Kwangdŏng-ri 광덕리 (廣德里)
- Samsŏng-ri 삼석리 (三石里)
- Samsŏng-ri 삼성리 (三成里)
- Todŏng-ri 도덕리 (道德里)
- Wŏnhŭng-ri 원흥리 (円興里)
- Wŏnsil-ri 원신리 (元新里)
