= Haeil =

North Korean unmanned underwater vehicle

- Type: Unmanned underwater vehicle
- Place of origin: North Korea

Service history
- In service: 2023–present

Production history
- Designed: Development started from 2009 or 2012
- Manufacturer: North Korea
- Variants: See § Variants

Specifications
- Length: Varies depending on variants
- Diameter: Varies depending on variants
- Warhead: Hwasan-31
- Launch platform: Coast-based launcher, surface ship, submarine

The Haeil (Korean: 해일; lit. 'Tsunami') is a series of unmanned underwater vehicles (UUV) produced by North Korea. First unveiled in 2023, the nuclear-capable Haeil has at least five variants, with three of which named by North Korean state media: Haeil-1, Haeil-2 and Haeil-5-23. Developments of Haeil likely started from at least 2009, but North Korea officially began it in 2012 according to state media claims, and its first public test occurred in March 2023; however, before its public debut, more than 50 Haeil tests occurred between 2021 and 2023.

== Description ==
The Haeil is claimed to be a UUV that can secretly attack enemy waters by underwater detonation of nuclear warheads, creating radioactive tsunamis that destroys warships and targets onshore. According to Korean Central Television, Haeil is an "important, super-powerful absolute weapon of the Republic’s nuclear combat forces that will sink the heinous invasion ships all at once with a tidal wave of vengeance".

Haeil can be deployed from coast, towed by surface ships, or launched from Hero Kim Kun Ok submarine. It is capable of carrying Hwasan-31 tactical nuclear warhead.

=== Variants ===
The Haeil series has at least five variants with different dimensions and capabilities. Three variants are named by North Korean state media.

==== Initial variant ====
The initial variant of Haeil has no number in its designation. Despite similarity with Russian Status-6, it uses conventional propulsion, resulting in a relatively slow speed of under 8 kn (15 km/h; 9.2 mph). According to NK News, it is one of the largest known variants of Haeil series, with a length of over 10 m (33 ft) and a diameter of 1.5 m (4 ft 11 in).

==== Haeil-1 ====
The Haeil-1 (《해일-1》형; lit. 'Tsunami Type 1') is claimed to be capable of carrying a nuclear warhead and generating "radioactive tsunami".

There are multiple estimates of Haeil-1's size. Radio Free Asia uses images from North Korean state media and estimates that Haeil-1 is about 14–16 m (46–52 ft) long and 1–1.2 m (3 ft 3 in – 3 ft 11 in) wide, while a Japanese estimation measures that Haeil-1 is about 5.02–5.74 m (16.5–18.8 ft) long and 0.8–0.9 m (2 ft 7 in – 2 ft 11 in) wide.

==== Haeil-2 ====
The Haeil-2 (《해일-2》형; lit. 'Tsunami Type 2') has a range of 1,000 km (620 mi) and an average speed of 8.5 km/h (4.6 kn). According to the Korean Central News Agency, Haeil-2 will serve as a promising military advantage of North Korean armed forces, essential for North Korea to counter adversary military actions as well as their threats.

Assuming Haeil-2 has a similar diameter to Haeil-1 according to Japanese estimation, Haeil-2 is estimated to have a length of 8–9 m (26–30 ft).

==== Haeil-5-23 ====
The Haeil-5-23 (《해일-5-23》; lit. 'Tsunami-5-23') is the most obscured Haeil variant. North Korea has never released images of Haeil-5-23.

By using underwater warhead detonations, Haeil-5-23 may also be able of generate powerful radioactive tsunamis. Although there is no details about its warhead, Haeil-5-23 may reveal hints of a nuclear warhead tentatively called Hwasan-23 (《화산-23》; lit. 'Volcano-23').

The Haeil-5-23 uses a complicated naming scheme, similar to Pulhwasal-3-31. It is used to give an impression that North Korea has developed new weapons. This designation also reveals that at least five variants of Haeil exist as of January 2024.

==== Other variants ====
During a military parade held on 27 July 2023, North Korea unveiled a new Haeil variant. The official name of this variant was not known. It is estimated to be smaller than Russia's Poseidon and similar to Haeil-2; however, Haeil-2 has a different rear section and is smaller than this variant. It is 16 m (52 ft) long, 1.5 m (4 ft 11 in) wide and apparently uses pump-jet propulsion. No test is known for this variant.

At a military exhibition opened on 4 October 2025, North Korea unveiled what appears to be another new variant of the Haeil series.

== History ==
According to North Korean state media, the development process of Haeil started in 2012. However, Haeil's development might start much earlier, in 2009. On 27 May 2020, the Haeil was first identified in satellite imagery, as a Planet Labs satellite image spotted a cylindrical object (likely Haeil-1 variant) standing at Sinpo Shipyard.

During the 8th Congress of the Workers' Party of Korea held in January 2021, Haeil was named. Later, in October 2021, at the "Self-Defence-2021" military exhibition, Politburo of the Workers' Party of Korea was informally reported about Haeil. After January 2021 and before March 2023, Haeil underwent more than 50 "shakedown" tests, including 29 "weapon tests" guided by Kim Jong Un.

The first public test of Haeil occurred between 21 and 23 March 2023. Several days later, on 25–27 March 2023, another test of a Haeil variant, named "Haeil-1", took place. Haeil-2 was revealed in April 2023 by a test. In January 2024, another variant of Haeil series, named "Haeil-5-23", made its public debut, also by testing.

=== Deployment ===
In December 2022, during the Sixth Plenary Session of the 8th Central Committee of the Workers' Party of Korea, North Korea decided to deploy Haeil.

In September 2025, Daily NK reported that North Korea had ordered trial deployment of Haeil. A three-stage deployment process of Haeil was also planned.

== List of tests ==
Attempt	Date	Variant	Duration	Outcome	Additional notes	References
1	21–23 March 2023	Haeil	59 hours, 12 minutes	Success	The UUV dived to a water depth of 80–150 m (260–490 ft). North Korea did not mention distance.	
2	25–27 March 2023	Haeil-1	41 hours, 27 minutes	Success	The UUV traveled 600 km (370 mi).	
3	4–7 April 2023	Haeil-2	71 hours, 6 minutes	Success	The UUV traveled 1,000 km (620 mi) along an oval and figure-of-eight course.	
4	Before 19 January 2024	Haeil-5-23	Unknown	Success	The test was a response from North Korea to trilateral United States, South Korea and Japan military drills.	

== Strategic implications ==
North Korea may use the tests of Haeil to demonstrate its nuclear deterrence capabilities. However, many South Korean and Western analysts remain skeptical about its power.

According to Ankit Panda, a Carnegie Endowment for International Peace analyst, Haeil may be vulnerable to anti-submarine warfares and preemptive strikes if it moves away from North Korea's coastal water and enters enemy's ports.

== See also ==
- Poseidon (unmanned underwater vehicle)
