= Hwasan-31 =

North Korean tactical nuclear warhead

- Type: Tactical nuclear weapon

Service history
- In service: 2023–present
- Used by: Korean People's Army Strategic Force

Production history
- Designer: North Korea
- Designed: 2023

Specifications
- Mass: 150–200 kg (330–440 lb)
- Length: 90 cm (35 in)
- Diameter: 40–50 cm (16–20 in)
- Blast yield: 4–30 kt

The Hwasan-31 (Korean: 화산-31; lit. 'Volcano-31') is a North Korean tactical nuclear warhead first unveiled in 2023.

== Design ==
Based on images released by North Korea, the Hwasan-31 is estimated to be 90 cm (35 in) long, 40–50 cm (16–20 in) wide, has a mass of 150–200 kg (330–440 lb) and a blast yield of 4–10 kt. It may utlize a variable-yield design.

== History ==
At the 8th Congress of the Workers' Party of Korea held in January 2021, North Korean leader Kim Jong Un planned to manufacture miniaturized nuclear weapons.

Hwasan-31 was officially unveiled on 27 March 2023, when Kim Jong Un inspected ten warhead units that apparently inert. North Korea's statement did not explicitly mention it; however, accompanying photos showed the name "Hwasan-31" written on an information board. During the revelation of Hwasan-31, North Korea also revealed official designation of some short-range ballistic missiles that was tested in years before.

== Capability ==
Hwasan-31 is capable of being carried by following weapon systems:

- Short-range ballistic missiles:
  - Hwasong-11A (KN-23)
  - Hwasong-11B (KN-24)
  - Hwasong-11C
  - Hwasong-11D
  - Hwasong-11S
  - KN-25 (600 mm multiple rocket launcher)
- Cruise missiles:
  - Hwasal-1
  - Hwasal-2
  - Pulhwasal-3-31
- Unmanned underwater vehicle:
  - Haeil

== Strategic implication ==
The revelation of Hwasan-31 has demonstrated North Korea’s progress towards the development of tactical nuclear weapons.
