= Hwasal-2 =

North Korean cruise missile

- Diagram of Hwasal-2 (white-painted version)
- Type: Long-range, land-attack cruise missile Surface-to-surface missile
- Place of origin: North Korea

Service history
- In service: 2021–present
- Used by: Korean People's Army

Production history
- Manufacturer: North Korea

Specifications
- Mass: 1,300 kg (2,900 lb)
- Length: 7 m (23 ft)
- Diameter: 0.6 m (2.0 ft)
- Warhead: tactical nuclear weapons 400 kg (880 lb) warhead
- Engine: turbofan or turbojet
- Operational range: About 1,500–2,000 km (930–1,240 mi)
- Launch platform: Transporter erector launcher (TEL), submarine, corvette ship

The Hwasal-2 (Korean: 《화살-2》형; lit. 'Arrow Type 2') is a North Korean land-attack cruise missile. A long-range cruise missile, Hwasal-2 made its public debut in October 2021 during a military exhibition. It was first test-fired in January 2022. North Korea has called Hwasal-2 as a "strategic" cruise missile.

== Description ==
The Hwasal-2 is estimated to be 7 m (23 ft) long, 0.6 m (2.0 ft) wide and weigh 1,300 kg (2,900 lb). Its assumed range is 1,500–2,000 km (930–1,240 mi). The estimated payload mass is 400 kg (880 lb). The Hwasal-2 can be launched by land-based mobile launcher, corvette ship or submarine.

It is capable of carrying the Hwasan-31 nuclear warhead.

Hwasal-2 has three color versions: White, black and dark blue.

== History ==
Hwasal-2 test fired in South Hamyong province on 22 March 2023.

This missile was first observed in Self-Defense-2021 military exhibition with another cruise missile, Hwasal-1.

On 23 February 2023, the Korean Central News Agency revealed the missile's official name as Hwasal-2.

A black-painted version was tested on 30 January 2024.

A dark blue-painted version of Hwasal-2 was also displayed during the launching ceremony for the destroyer Choe Hyon on 25 April 2025.

== List of Hwasal-2 launches ==
Attempt	Date	Location	Pre-launch announcement / detection	Outcome	Additional notes	Reference(s)
1	25 January 2022	Hamhung (39.111832°N 127.666801°E)	None	Success	North Korea did not mention the name of missile, later confirmed as Hwasal-2 as it has same design.	
2	12 October 2022	Kaechon	None	Success	North Korea also did not reveal official name of the missile in this test. The missiles flew for over 10,200 seconds and hit the target 2,000 km (1,200 mi) away. Kim Jong Un supervised the test. The images of this test may be from the September 2021 tests of the then-unnamed Hwasal-1. According to 38 North, the missiles launched in October 2022 test were Hwasal-2.	
3	23 February 2023	Kimchaek	None	Unknown	North Korea asserted launch of four missiles, which travelled 2,000 km (1,200 mi) before hitting an unspecified target. However, South Korean Ministry of National Defense was skeptical on North Korean news report. Image showed a Hwasal-2 in white livery with black-painted nose cone being launched.	
4	22 March 2023	South Hamgyong	None	Success	North Korea launched two Hwasal-2 along with another two Hwasal-1 cruise missiles. Kim Jong Un oversaw the test.	
5	Before 21 August 2023	South Hamgyong	None	Success	Kim Jong Un supervised the launch. North Korea launched at least two Hwasal-2 missiles over the Amnok-class ship. However, the exact date was not mentioned.	
6	30 January 2024	Unknown	None	Success	Images showed a Hwasal-2 in black livery, with white-painted nose cone.	

== See also ==
- Hwasal-1
- Pulhwasal-3-31
