= Hwasal-1 =

North Korean cruise missile

- Type: Land-attack cruise missile
- Place of origin: North Korea

Service history
- In service: 2021–present
- Used by: Korean People's Army Strategic Force

Production history
- Manufacturer: North Korea

Specifications
- Warhead: Conventional or tactical nuclear warhead
- Operational range: 1,500–2,000 km (930–1,240 mi)
- Guidance system: INS combined with TERCOM
- Launch platform: Transporter erector launcher

The Hwasal-1 (Korean: 《화살-1》형; lit. 'Arrow Type 1') is a North Korean land-attack cruise missile. The first long-range cruise missile of North Korea, Hwasal-1 made its public debut in September 2021 with a flight test. A nuclear-capable missile, it can evade missile defenses by using low and complex trajectories while flying at a subsonic speed. North Korea has called Hwasal-1 as a "strategic" cruise missile.

The missile also has a larger warhead version, called Hwasal-1 Ra-3, first tested in 2024.

== Description ==
Images of the Hwasal-1
- Launch of the missile

Hwasal-1's normal range is about 1,500 km (930 mi), but can be extended to 2,000 km (1,200 mi). It uses inertial guidance system (INS) combined with TERCOM, which can be updated via satellite. With this guidance system, the missile can use low and complex trajectories, enabling Hwasal-1 to evade detection and interception.

Based on information from maiden flight in September 2021, Hwasal-1 appears to be a subsonic cruise missile.

According to North Korea, it is a "strategic" cruise missile. Hwasal-1 is capable of carrying the Hwasan-31 tactical nuclear warhead. Hwasal-1 also have variants that can be armed with a conventional warhead.

== History ==
Hwasal-1 was first launched in September 2021.

Further flight tests of Hwasal-1 were carried out in 2022 and 2023. However, the official name of the missile was only revealed in March 2023 test.

== List of launches ==
Attempt	Date	Location	Number of missiles tested	Outcome	Additional notes	Reference(s)
1	11–12 September 2021	Unknown	2	Success	First test-fire of Hwasal-1. North Korea did not reveal official name in this test.	
2	2 November 2022	North Hamgyong Province	2	Success (North Korea claimed); No launch detected (South Korea claimed)	Like the earlier September 2021 test, North Korea also did not reveal official name of the missile in this test. According to North Korea, the missiles flew with 590.5 km (366.9 mi) range and landing in the international waters 80 km (50 mi) off the coast of Ulsan, South Korea. However, South Korea did not detect any cruise missile launch in this date.	
3	22 March 2023	Hamhung, South Hamgyong Province	2	Success	These missiles flew for over 7,500 seconds with 1,500 km (930 mi) trajectory and were launched with two Hwasal-2 missiles. Kim Jong Un oversaw the test-fire. North Korea disclosed official name in this test.	
4	18 September 2024	Unknown	Unknown	Success	The missile was not named by North Korean state media. According to North Korea, the missile was highly upgraded for combat use. Kim Jong Un oversaw the launch.	
5	28 December 2025	Sunan, Pyongyang	2	Success	The launch may highly likely involve upgraded Hwasal-1 missiles. Kim Jong Un oversaw the launch. The missiles flew along predetermined trajectories in the Yellow Sea for 10,199 and 10,203 seconds before hitting targets.	

== Hwasal-1 Ra-3 ==
Images of the Hwasal-1 Ra-3
- Launch of the missile

The Hwasal-1 Ra-3 (Note: Also spelled Hwasal-1D-3.) (《화살-1라-3》형; lit. 'Arrow Type 1D-3') is a variant of Hwasal-1 with larger warhead. It may have a silghtly longer length than the original missile, and the warhead is likely to be conventional.

On 19 April 2024, Hwasal-1 Ra-3 made its public debut as a Hwasal-1 Ra-3 was test-fired to test super-large warhead. The test was reported to be likely conducted from Onchon Air Base.

It is possible that a Hwasal-1 Ra-3 was tested on 2 February 2024, before its official public debut.

In December 2025, there were some open-source reports that Russia might use Hwasal-1 Ra-3 in its invasion of Ukraine. These missiles can be armed with a 1,000 kg (2,200 lb) warhead and hit the target 130–250 km (81–155 mi) away.

== See also ==
- Hwasal-2
- Pulhwasal-3-31
