= List of universities in North Korea =

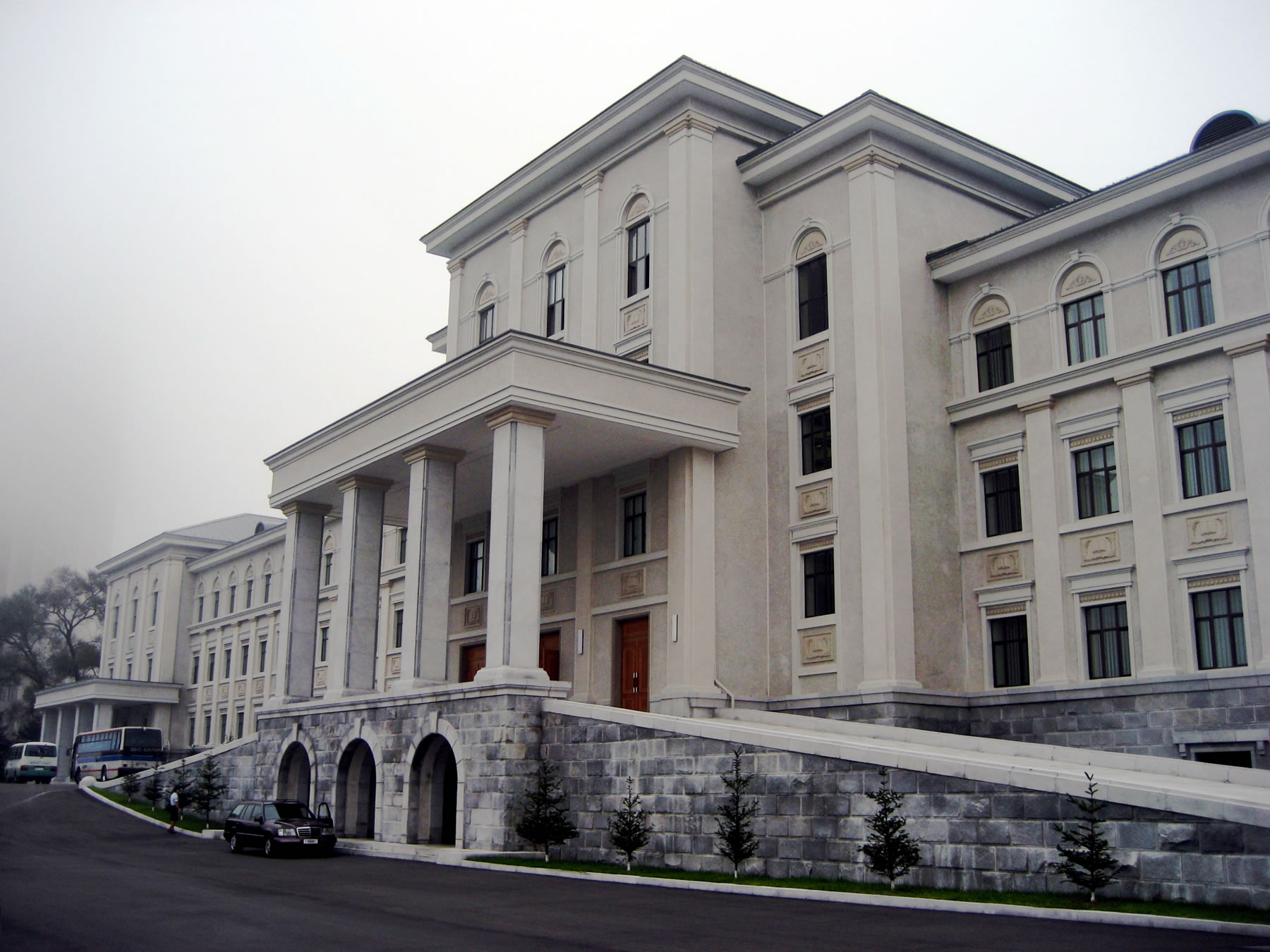
Kim Il-sung University

There are more than 300 colleges and universities in North Korea. Universities and colleges in North Korea are classified into central class and local colleges. Central universities are managed and controlled by the central (national) government while local universities are managed by local governments. Also, they can be classified into social, special, and military colleges. Special colleges were established with the purpose to raise top executives. Students who have just graduated from high school cannot enter special colleges without any experience in industrial or cooperative farm careers.

== List ==
Name	Abbreviation	Established	Location	Ref	Classification
Kanggye University of Agriculture and Forestry (Note: Formerly Kanggye University of Agriculture.)		1970	Chagang Province		Local
Changsusan University (장수산의과대학) (Note: Formerly known as Haeju Medical University (해주의학대학).)		1969	South Hwanghae Province		Local
Central Cadres Training School of the Workers' Party of Korea (청진광산금속대학)		2024	Pyongyang		Central
Chongjin University of Medicine			Chongjin		Local
Chongjin University of Mining and Metallurgy			Chongjin		Local
Chongjin O Jung Hup University of Education (오중흡청진제일사범대학)		1946	Chongjin		Local
Chongjin University of Technology			Chongjin		Local
Wonsan Jong Jun Thaek University of Economics 정준택원산경제대학		1960	Wonsan, Kangwon Province		Central
Chongsong University (정성대학)		1946	South Hamgyong Province		Local
Korea University of Physical Education (조선체육대학)		1958	Pyongyang		Central
Hambuk University (함북농업대학)		1970	North Hamgyong Province		Local
Hamhung University of Chemical Industry (함흥화학공업대학)		15 September 1947	Hamhŭng		Central
Huichon University of Telecommunications (희천체신대학)		1 September 1959	Huichon		Central
Inpung University (인풍의학대학)		1969	Chagang Province		
Institute of Natural Science	INS	1967	South Pyongan Province		Central
Kang Gon University (강건대학)		1971	North Hwanghae Province		Local
Karimchon University (가림천대학)		1971	Ryanggang Province		Local
Kim Chaek University of Technology (김책공업종합대학)	KUT	May 1988	Pyongyang		Central
Kim Chol Ju University of Education		September 1972 (separated from Pyongyang Teacher Training College)	Pyongyang		Central
Kim Hyong Jik University of Education		October 1946 (as from Pyongyang Teacher Training College)	Pyongyang		Central
Kim Il Sung Military University (김일성군사대학)		25 October 1956	Pyongyang		Military
Kim Il Sung University (김일성종합대학)	KISU	1 October 1946	Pyongyang		Central
Kim Il Sung University of Politics		February 1972	Pyongyang		Special
Kim Je-won University (김제원대학)		1960	South Hwanghae Province		Local
Koryo Songgyungwan University		1 September 1992	Kaesong		Local
Kumya University (금야대학)		1958	South Hamgyong Province		Local
Kwangje University (광제의과대학)		1969	North Pyongan Province		Local
Kye Ung-sang University (계응상대학)		1 September 1959	North Hwanghae Province		Central
Kyongsong University (경성의과대학)		1948	North Hamgyong Province		Local
Manpung University (만풍대학)		1969	North Pyongan Province		Local
Nampo University (남포농업대학)		1967	Nampo		Local
Ponghwa University (봉화의과대학)		1972	South Pyongan Province		Military
Pyongyang Jang Chol-gu University of Commerce (장철구평양상업대학)		1970	Pyongyang		Central
Pyongyang Medical University (평양의학대학)		1948	Pyongyang		Central
Pyongyang University of Agriculture (평양농업대학)		1981	Pyongyang		Central
Pyongyang University of Automation (Note: Formerly known as Mirim College.) (지휘자동화대학 or 미림대학)			Pyongyang		Central
Pyongyang University of Cinematics (평양연극영화대학)		1953	Pyongyang		Central
Pyongyang University of Computer Technology			Pyongyang		Central
Pyongyang University of Fine Arts (평양미술대학)		10 September 1947	Pyongyang		Central
Pyongyang University of Foreign Studies		15 November 1949	Pyongyang		Central
Pyongyang Han Tok Su University of Light Industry (한덕수평양경공업대학)		1959	Pyongyang		Central
Pyongyang University of Mechanical Engineering (평양기계대학)		1948	Pyongyang		Central
Pyongyang University of Music and Dance (Note: Currently Pyongyang Kim Won Gyun University of Music and Dance.)		1972	Pyongyang		Central
Pyongyang University of Printing Engineering (평양인쇄공업대학)		1984	Pyongyang		Central
Pyongyang University of Transport (평양교통운수대학)		1959	Pyongyang		Central
Pyongyang University of Science and Technology	PUST	25 October 2010	Pyongyang		Private
Rajin University of Marine Transport (라진해운대학)		1968	Rason		Central
Ryanggang University (량강대학)		1959	Ryanggang Province		Local
Sariwon University of Koryo Pharmacology (Note: Formerly Sariwon Pharmaceutical College of Koryo.)		1968	Sariwon		Central
Sinuiju University of Light Industry (신의주경공업대학)		1982	Sinuiju		Local
Nampho University of Fisheries (남포수산대학)			Nampo		Local
Songdowon University (송도원의학대학)		1971	Kangwon Province		Local
Tonghae University (동해수산대학)		1959	Kangwon Province		Local
Phyongsong University of Coal Mining		1968	Pyongsong		Central
University of Construction and Building Materials (평양건설건재대학 or 평양건축대학)		1959	Pyongyang		Central
University of Geology (사리원지질대학)		1970	North Hwanghae Province		Central
Hamhung University of Hydraulic Engineering (Note: Formerly University of Hydraulics and Dynamics.)		1959	South Hamgyong Province		
University of National Economy (인민경제대학)		1946	Pyongyang		Special
University of Sciences (리과대학)	UOS	17 January 1967	Pyongyang		Central
Phyongsong University of Veterinary Science and Animal Husbandry		1955	Pyongsong, South Pyongan Province		Central
Wonsan Agricultural University(원산농업대학)		1948	Wonsan		Central
Wonsan University of Fisheries (원산수산대학)			Wonsan		
Wonsan Ri Su Dok Teacher Training College (리수덕원산교원대학)			Wonsan		local
Hamhung Choe Hui Suk Teacher Training College (함흥 최희숙교원대학)			Hamhung		local
Hamhung University of Medicine		1946	Hamhung		
Pyongyang University of Education No. 2		1946; 2026 (rebuild)	Pyongyang		
Hyesan University of Agriculture and Forestry			Hyesan		Local
Phyongsong University of Medicine			Pyongsong		Local
Sariwon University of Geology			Sariwon		Local
Kanggye University of Technology			Kanggye		Local
Hamhung University of Education			Hamhung		Local
Chongjin University of Agriculture			Chongjin		Local
Sinuiju Cha Kwang Su University of Education			Sinuiju		Local
Pyongyang University of Architecture		1953	Pyongyang		
Sariwon Ri Kye Sun University of Education		January 2026 (rebuild)	Sariwon		
Sinuiju Teacher Training College			Sinuiju		
Ryanggang Provincial Taekwon-do University			Ryanggang		
Phyongbuk University of Technology			North Pyongan Province		
Wonsan Commercial Service College			Wonsan		
Sinuiju University of Technology			Sinuiju		
Phihyon College of Land Management			North Pyongan Province		
Sinuiju Medical University			Sinuiju		
Sinuiju College of Technology			Sinuiju		
Kusong City Vocational Technology College for Medical Workers			Kusong		
Nampho University of Education			Nampo		
Phyongsong Teacher Training College			Pyongsong		
Pyongyang Tourism College			Pyongyang		
Sariwon Kang Kon University of Medicine			Sariwon		
Haeju Kim Jong Thae University of Education			Haeju		
Jaeryong University of Agriculture			Chaeryong		
Songdo University of Education			Kaesong		
Sunchon College of Technology			Sunchon		
Wonsan University of Medicine			Wonsan		
Sinuiju University of Medicine			Sinuiju		
Samjiyon Tourism College			Samjiyon		
Sariwon University of Geology			Sariwon		
Kanggye University of Medicine		c. 2025 (rebuild)	Kanggye		
Sinuiju College of Physical Education			Sinuiju		
Kanggye College of Physical Education			Kanggye		
Chongjin College of Physical Education			Chongjin		
Wonsan College of Physical Education			Wonsan		
Phyongsong College of Physical Education			Pyongsong		
Hamhung College of Physical Education			Hamhung		
Kumsong University of Politics			Pyongyang		
Nampho University of Agriculture			Nampo		
Sariwon Teacher Training College			Sariwon		
Kanggye University of Education			Kanggye		
Phyongsong University of Education			Pyongsong		
Kim Jong Suk University of Education					
Haeju Jo Ok Hui Teachers Training College			Haeju		
Kanggye Teachers Training College			Kanggye		
Pyongyang Teachers Training College		1968	Pyongyang		
Phyongbuk College of Technology			North Pyongan Province		
Wonsan University of Education			Wonsan		
Sunchon Ri Su Bok University of Chemical Engineering			Sunchon		
Anju University of Technology			Anju, South Pyongan Province		
Sukchon University of Agriculture			Sukchon		
Sinpho Kim Hyong Gwon University of Technology and Education			Sinpo		
Hamhung College of Technology			Hamhung		
Nampho Teachers Training College			Nampo		
Pyongyang College of Cooking Technology			Pyongyang		
Phyongsong University of Technology			Phyongsong		
Phyongsong College of Technology			Phyongsong		
Nampho College of Maritime Transport			Nampo		
Nampho University of Physical Education			Nampo		
Hamhung College of Construction			Hamhung		
Hamhung University of Technology			Hamhung		
Hamhung University of Agriculture			Hamhung		
Hamhung Commercial Service College			Hamhung		
Hamhung University of Pharmacology			Hamhung		
Hamhung University of Computer Science			Hamhung		
Tanchon College of Technology			Tanchon		
Pukchong College of Technology			Pukchong		
Nampho University of Marine Transport			Nampo		
Hamhung Commercial Service College			Hamhung		
North Hwanghae Provincial College of Physical Education		1923	Sariwon		

== See also ==
- List of universities and colleges in South Korea
- Korea University (Japan)
