= Korea General Machinery Trading Corporation =

The Korea General Machinery Trading Corporation (Korean: 조선기계무역총회사) is a North Korean machine company. It is headquartered in the Tongdaewon District near the capital, Pyongyang.

The company imports steel, chemical raw stock, and machine tools. It produces machine tools, metal parts, gears, electric motors, generators, hydroelectric generators, pumps, valves, mining equipment, rolling stock and other machinery.

== Taean Heavy Machine Complex ==
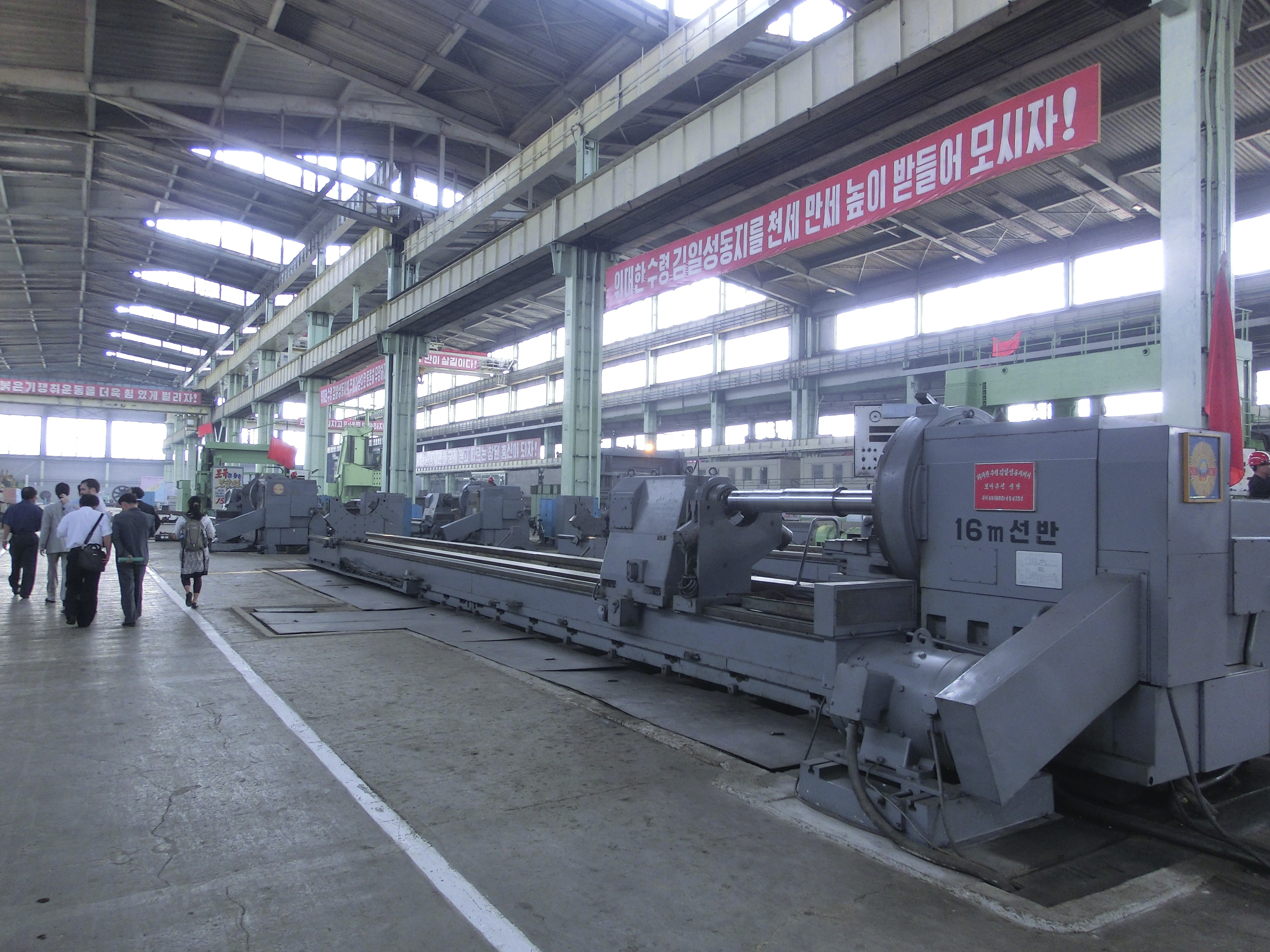
Taean Heavy Machine Complex

The Taean Heavy Machine Complex in Tongdaewon produces hydroelectric generators and other thermal power generating equipment, including turbines, motors, transformers, etc. Taean manufactures different sizes classes of hydroelectric equipment in its Tongsuse Class, including a 50,000 kVA generator.

== Huichon Machine Tool Factory ==
Huichon Machine Tool Factory in Huichon is North Korea's leading manufacturer of heavy-duty machine tools for domestic use and for export. The 50-year-old factory group is involved in machine tool production processes including steel-making, casting, processing, assembly, painting and packing. Product is produced on serial basis and small lot basis.

Its output of precision machine tools includes an assortment of spline-grinding machines and industrial lathes.

== See also ==
- Economy of North Korea
