= University of Sciences =

University in Pyongsong, North Korea

- 리과대학
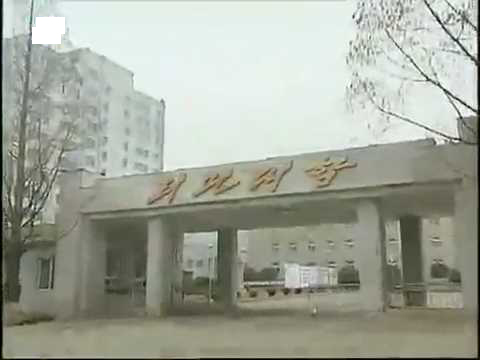
- Type: Public
- Established: 1967; 59 years ago
- President: Kim, Jun-Nam
- Students: 3000
- Location: Unjong-guyok, Science 1-dong, Pyongyang, North Korea
- Campus: Urban

- University of Sciences
- Chosŏn'gŭl: 리과대학
- Hancha: 理科大學
- Revised Romanization: Rigwa Daehak
- McCune–Reischauer: Rikwa Taehak

University of Sciences is a university located inside the region of the National Academy of Science in Pyongyang, North Korea. The university was previously called as "Institute of Natural Science". UOS is geographically located in Pyongsong, South Pyong'an Province, North Korea. However, North Korean government appointed the area of science district to belong to Pyongyang for giving some privileges of Pyongyang citizens to scientists of NAS and students of UOS. As Kim Il Sung, a former leader of North Korea, emphasized the significance of education for gifted and talented students, UOS originally started as a branch of Kim Il Sung University on January 17, 1967. It was separated from Kim Il Sung University in 1985. In North Korea, this university is known as "Sujae Daehark (University for talented students)". In South Korean mass media, this university is called "KAIST of North Korea".

Top students of natural sciences or engineering in North Korea study at this university supported totally by North Korean government. Eighty percent of them is graduated from No.1 Middle Schools, which are science high schools for gifted and talented students in North Korea, and the rest twenty percent are medal winners in the National Science Olympiads (math, physics, chemistry, and biology) or national science quiz contests. Unlike other universities in North Korea, students entering UNS have age limit. Equal or younger than 17 people are eligible to take entrance exam for UOS.

It is known that many alums of this university are involved in projects for developing missiles and launching artificial earth satellites.

== Departments ==
There are six departments in UOS. Each department has five or six majors.

=== Physics ===
- Theoretical Physics
- Thermal Physics
- Solid State Physics
- Optics

=== Mathematics ===
- Control Mathematics
- Applied Mathematics
- Information Mathematics

=== Chemistry ===
- Theoretical Chemistry
- Inorganic Chemistry(material)
- Organic Chemistry
- Analytical Chemistry
- Laboratory of Applied Chemistry

=== Biology ===
- Molecular Biology
- Chemical Biology
- General Genetics
- Molecular Genetics
- Cell Genetics
- Statistical Genetics
- Biological Information

=== Mechanical Engineering ===
- Plasma and Hydrodynamics
- Mechanical Dynamics
- Solid Mechanics

== Achievements ==
In 2014, the university placed 75th in the International Collegiate Programming Contest (ICPC). As of May 2026, this is the first and only time they have participated in this contest.

== Notable alumni ==
=== Academics ===
- Kim Ha (김하): Professor of Physics, University of Natural Science,
- Joseph Han: A North Korean defector and a physicist. He earned a PhD degree in nuclear physics from Texas A&M University in 2016. He is the first North Korean defector to receive a doctorate from a university in the United States.
- Jang Hyekyung (장혜경): Professor of Mathematics, University of Natural Science
- Kim Ho (김호): Professor of Mathematics, University of Natural Science. He received his Doctoral degree in his twenties.
- Kim Kwang-hyun (김광현): A scientist at Laser Institute of State Academy of Sciences of North Korea. He became a junior associate in the International Centre for Theoretical Physics (ICTP) in 2015.
- Kim Seo-in (김서인): A former head of department in Math Institute of the National Academy of Science of North Korea, the youngest PhD recipient of North Korea.

=== Business ===
- Lee Choong-kook (이충국): A North Korean defector. Director of Dandelion Oriental Medicine Clinic
- Lee Yun-keol (이윤걸): A North Korean defector and Chairman of NK Strategic Information Service Center

=== Politics, Government and Public Service ===
- Kim Seung-du (김승두): Chairman of National Education Commission, North Korea
- Lee Kwang-ho (리광호): Minister of Science Education Department, North Korea

== Literature and popular culture ==
- The Schoolgirl's Diary (한 녀학생의 일기): A 2007 North Korean film directed by Jang In-hak. In the last part of the film, it was shown that Mihyang, the main character of the film, entered University of Sciences (리과대학) for becoming a scientist like her dad. The Schoolgirl's Diary on YouTube

== See also ==
- List of universities in North Korea
- Pyongyang University of Science and Technology
- Education in North Korea
