= Hamhung Grand Theatre =

Theatre in Hamhung, North Korea

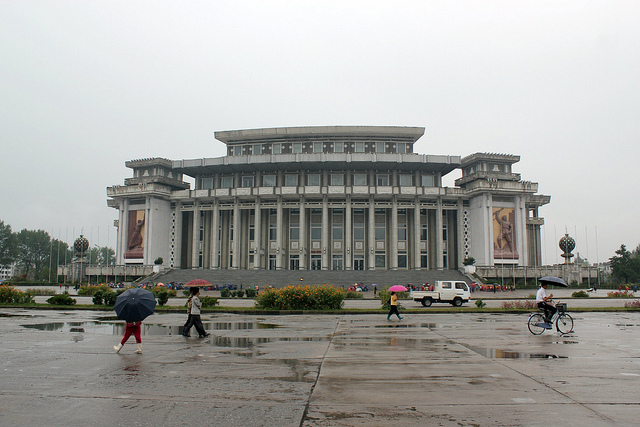
- The building in 2011

General information
- Location: Hamhung, North Korea
- Coordinates: 39°54′54″N 127°32′12″E
- Known for: Largest theatre in North Korea

The Hamhung Grand Theatre (Korean: 함흥대극장; Hanja: 咸興大劇場; MR: Hamhŭng-daegŭkchang) is a theatre located in Hamhung, North Korea. It is the largest theatre building in the country.

The building is used for major live theatrical productions by the revolutionary opera troupe. The foyer inside features a large mural of the current leader Kim Jong-un and his father Kim Jong-Il.

== See also ==
- List of theatres in North Korea
