= Huichon University of Telecommunications =

University in North Korea

- 희천 공업 대학
- Type: Public
- Established: September 1, 1959; 67 years ago
- Location: Huichon, Chagang, Democratic People's Republic of Korea; 40°11′25.9″N 126°14′35.2″E

- Huichon University of Telecommunications
- Chosŏn'gŭl: 희천 공업 대학
- Hancha: 熙川工業大學
- Revised Romanization: Huicheon Gongeop Daehak
- McCune–Reischauer: Hŭich'ŏn Kongŏp Taehak

The Huichon University of Telecommunications is located in Huichon, Chagang, North Korea, founded on September 1, 1959.

It is equipped with TV broadcasting equipment, computers, and electronic facilities and materials for education and scientific research.

It has faculties such as an electric communication engineering faculty, computer controlling engineering faculty, electronics faculty and wireless communication engineering faculty. It has also an electronics institute and other institutes, laboratories, a postgraduate course, a library, a practice workshop and a printing house.

Ninety-five percent of the teaching staff are holders of academic degrees and titles.

== See also ==
- List of universities in North Korea
