= Kim Ch'ŏlchu =

Korean independence activist (1916–1935)

- Born: 12 June 1916; Heijō, Korea, Empire of Japan
- Died: 14 June 1935 (aged 19); Yanji, Kirin, Manchukuo
- Parents: Kim Hyŏngjik (father); Kang Pan Sok (mother)
- Relatives: Kim Il Sung (brother); Kim Yong-ju (brother); Kim Jong Il (nephew); Kim Jong Un (Grandnephew)

Korean name
- Hangul: 김철주
- Hanja: 金鐵株
- RR: Gim Cheolju
- MR: Kim Ch'ŏlchu

Kim Ch'ŏlchu (Korean: 김철주; Hanja: 金鐵株; 12 June 1916 – 14 June 1935) was a Korean independence activist. He was one of the younger brothers of Kim Il Sung, the first supreme leader and founder of North Korea.

== Biography ==
Kim was born on 12 June 1916 in the Mangyongdae neighborhood of Pyongyang, when the peninsula was still under Japanese rule. His parents were Kim Hyong-jik, a Korean independence activist, and mother, Kang Pan Sok. His two brothers were Kim Il Sung, the first supreme leader of North Korea, and Kim Yong-ju, who became Honorary Vice President of the country's Supreme People's Assembly. Kim's family originated from Jeonju, North Jeolla. His paternal great-grandfather Kim Ŭngu settled in Mangyongdae in 1860. Kim was raised in a Christian family, specifically following the Presbyterian denomination. His maternal grandfather was a Protestant minister, and his father attended a missionary school. Kim's family participated in anti-Japanese activities and fled to Manchuria in 1920, like most Korean families, to escape famine and Japanese oppression during the Japanese occupation of Korea.

Kim became an active member of the Saenal Youth Union, Korea's first revolutionary youth organization. He later joined the Young Communist League. He died in battle in Yanji on 14 June 1935. He is buried in the Taesongsan Revolutionary Martyrs' Cemetery. The Kim Chol Ju University of Education is named after him.

The Kim family tree (DPRK)

Na Hyeon-Jik	Kim Song-Ryeong
Lady Lee	Kim Ŭngu
Yi Poik	Kim Pohyŏn
Kang Pan Sok	Kim Hyong-jik	Kim Hyŏnggwŏn	Kim Hyŏngnok
Kim Song-ae	Kim Il Sung	Kim Jong Suk	Kim Yong-ju	Kim Ch'ŏlchu
Kim Pyong Il	Kim Jong Il	Kim Kyong-hui	Kim Man-il
