= Konrad Püschel =

- Born: Friedrich Konrad Püschel; 12 April 1907; Wernsdorf bei Glauchau, Germany
- Died: 20 January 1997 (aged 89); Weimar, Germany
- Education: Bauhaus
- Occupation(s): Architect, Town Planner, Academic
- Employer: Hochschule für Architektur und Bauwesen Weimar (1948–1972)
- Known for: Restoration of the Bauhaus Dessau building
- Spouse: Lieselotte "Lilo" Püschel (m. 1933 – his death)
- Children: 2 daughters
- Awards: North Korean "Order of Korean Labour"

Friedrich Konrad Püschel (12 April 1907 – 20 January 1997) was a German architect, town planner and university professor who was educated at the Bauhaus design school. He worked in East Germany, the Soviet Union and North Korea.

== Early life ==
Konrad Püschel was born on 12 April 1907 in Wernsdorf, a village near Glauchau in the eastern state of Saxony. His father, Urban Richard Püschel, the village pastor, had studied at Leipzig University but was from a working-class background of miners, foresters, and farmers. Püschel had four brothers; Gottfried, Martin, Walter, and Georg. The three elder brothers served in World War I; Martin was killed in October 1914, aged 20. Walter, who was severely injured in the war, died in 1920.

The family finances were badly affected by hyperinflation in the Weimar Republic, so at 16 Püschel began an apprenticeship with a master carpenter in a firm in Glauchau in May 1923, which he completed in April 1926. There he learned a wide range of woodworking, furniture-making, and building skills, including reading the detailed architectural plans and drawings from which he had to work.

As a young man in 1920s Weimar Republic Germany, Püschel began to socialise with young artists and became interested in Modernism. His friends often discussed the Bauhaus and its teaching methods, and he decided to apply to study there.

== Bauhaus Dessau ==
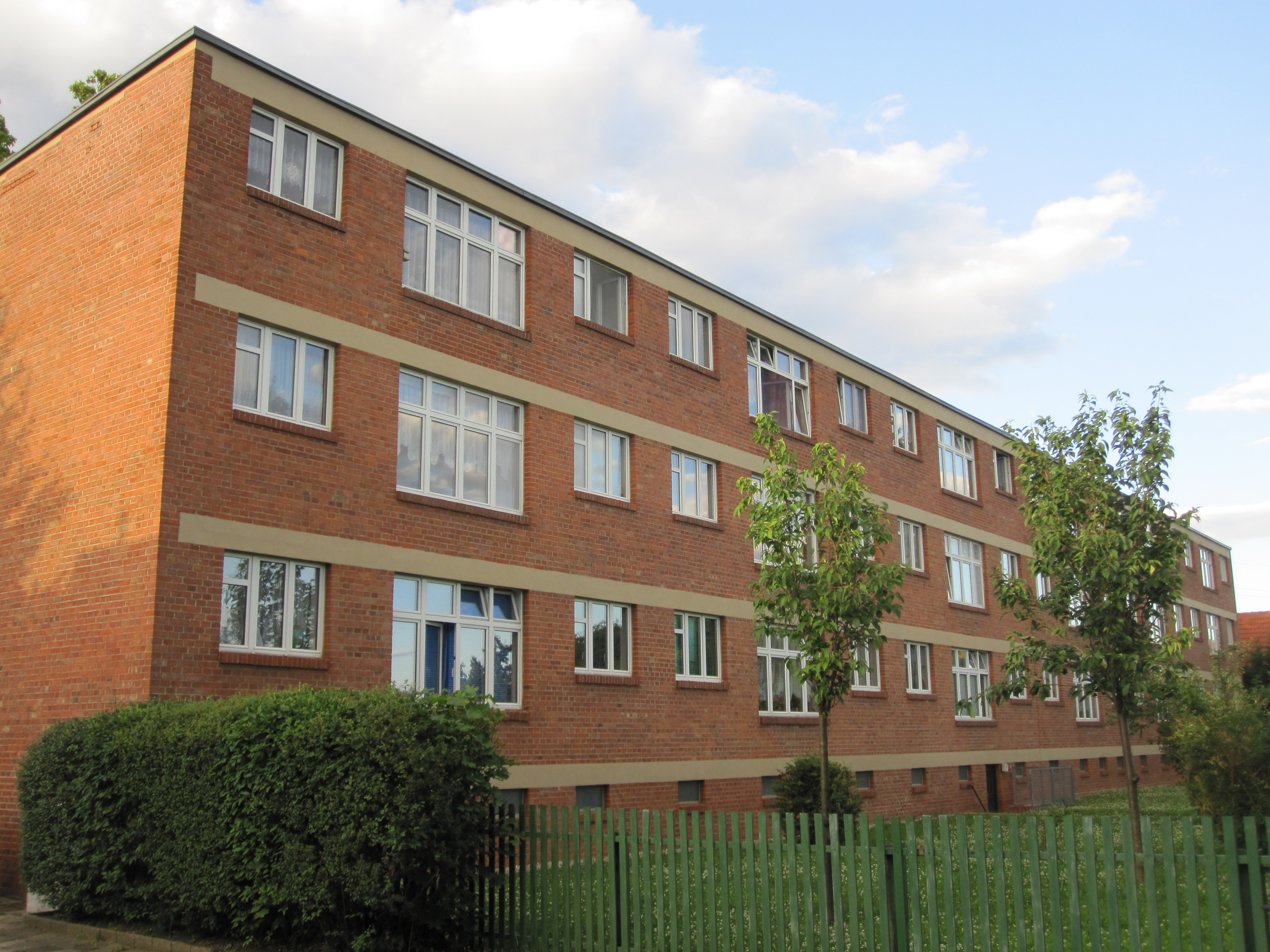
One of the Laubenganghäuser apartment blocks, from the garden side, built 1930

Püschel began his studies at the Bauhaus in Dessau on 1 November 1926, enabling him to be present for the official opening of the Bauhaus Dessau building on 4 December 1926. He first took Josef Albers' preliminary course, as all students did. He was also taught painting by Paul Klee and Wassily Kandinsky and photography by László Moholy-Nagy, and he participated in Oskar Schlemmer's stage workshop. He spent his second semester at the Bauhaus, starting in April 1927, studying under Marcel Breuer in the wood sculpture workshop. In 1928 he undertook a building apprenticeship at the school, and in March 1929 he began studying architecture in the Building Department under Hannes Meyer, the director of the Bauhaus.

Between 1929 and 1930, as part of his training under Meyer, he worked on the Laubenganghäuser apartments in Dessau, a social housing project, along with fellow students Philipp Tolziner, Béla Scheffler, Hans Volger, Hubert Hoffmann, and others, covering all aspects of running a large building project including design, construction management and project accounting.

In 1929, also under the direction of Meyer, he did an internship at the ADGB Trade Union School building site in Bernau bei Berlin, which had the social-egalitarian aims of bringing students into contact with the building site workers and giving them experience with the practical aspects of building. "Meyer's was a holistic approach to architecture, making no distinction between masters and students, or site managers and skilled tradesmen."

Püschel received his Bauhaus Diploma, Diploma number 21, from Mies van der Rohe on 15 October 1930.

== Soviet Union ==
Meyer was dismissed from his post as Bauhaus Director on 1 August 1930 because of the growth of communist influence at the school, which Meyer had not discouraged. Later that year, he emigrated to the Soviet Union, where he taught at the WASI, an architecture and civil engineering academy. He later held a number of other posts in Moscow.

Seven former Bauhaus students, including Püschel, all of whom had studied architecture under Meyer, went to Moscow to join him. The group was informally known as the "Red Bauhaus Brigade" ("Rote Bauhausbrigade"), or the "Brigade Rot Front". Béla Scheffler, who grew up in Belarus and was able to help with translating, was the first to join Meyer. Püschel and Philipp Tolziner went to Moscow together in February 1931. The others in the group were Tibor Weiner, René Mensch, Antonin Urban, and Klaus Meumann.

Other foreign architects and planners were brought to the Soviet Union around this time, as the government was about to reach the end of its First Five-Year Plan in 1932, the aim of which was to transform the Soviet Union from an agriculture state to an industrial powerhouse. Up to 800 Germans then worked in the Soviet Union's building industry. The architect Ernst May was also working in Moscow leading a group of young European architects.

In Moscow, Püschel worked on school buildings, which were much in need. He returned to Germany for a holiday in 1932, where he met up with his future wife Lieselotte, known as "Lilo", whom he had known since his days as a student. He returned to Moscow alone, but she joined him in December 1932, and they married in Moscow on 12 December 1933. Lilo studied medicine at Lomonosov University in Moscow. From 1934 he worked in the industrial city of Orsk, in the southern Urals, working on the Sotsgorod Orsk project, building housing, sports halls, kindergartens, schools and college buildings. International political tensions in the mid-1930s and Stalinism becoming wary of foreigners made Meyer return to Switzerland in 1936. Püschel returned to Germany in May 1937. Three of the other members of the Red Bauhaus Brigade were arrested by the Soviet authorities in the late 1930s and early 1940s. Béla Scheffler was accused of being a spy and executed by firing squad in 1942, Antonin Urban died in a gulag in 1942; Klaus Meumann disappeared in the late 1930s and is assumed to have died in a gulag as well.

== Nazi era ==
Immediately upon returning to Glauchau, Püschel was interrogated for two days by the Gestapo in the basement of the town hall, and his relatives were also questioned. As he was not a member of any left-wing political party, he was let go with the understanding that he would be under the watch of the Nazis. He was not allowed to work for any government agency and so he began a blacksmith's apprenticeship in his father-in-law's foundry and thus obtained work with a building firm in the area around Merseburg, mainly by leading apartment building projects. However, under pressure from local Nazis, the firm dismissed him. He and his wife were also evicted from their flat.

He was then employed by the architect Alfred Arndt, a former student and teacher at the Bauhaus, in Probstzella, Thüringia, where his daughter Monika was born in 1938.

In 1939, while he was working for Arndt, he designed the home and weaving workshop of the Bauhaus-trained weaver Margaretha Reichardt in Erfurt. The building is now a protected historic monument and preserved as the Margaretha Reichardt Haus Museum.

In May 1940, he was conscripted into the Wehrmacht and, after his training, was sent to North Africa and Italy. He had leave to return home in 1943, which resulted in the birth of his second daughter, Maria, in February 1944. In July 1944 he was sent to the Eastern Front in Poland. He was wounded in January 1945, captured by the Soviets and held as a German prisoner of war until December 1947. When he returned to Germany, he was only 40 kg (88 lb).

== Later life ==
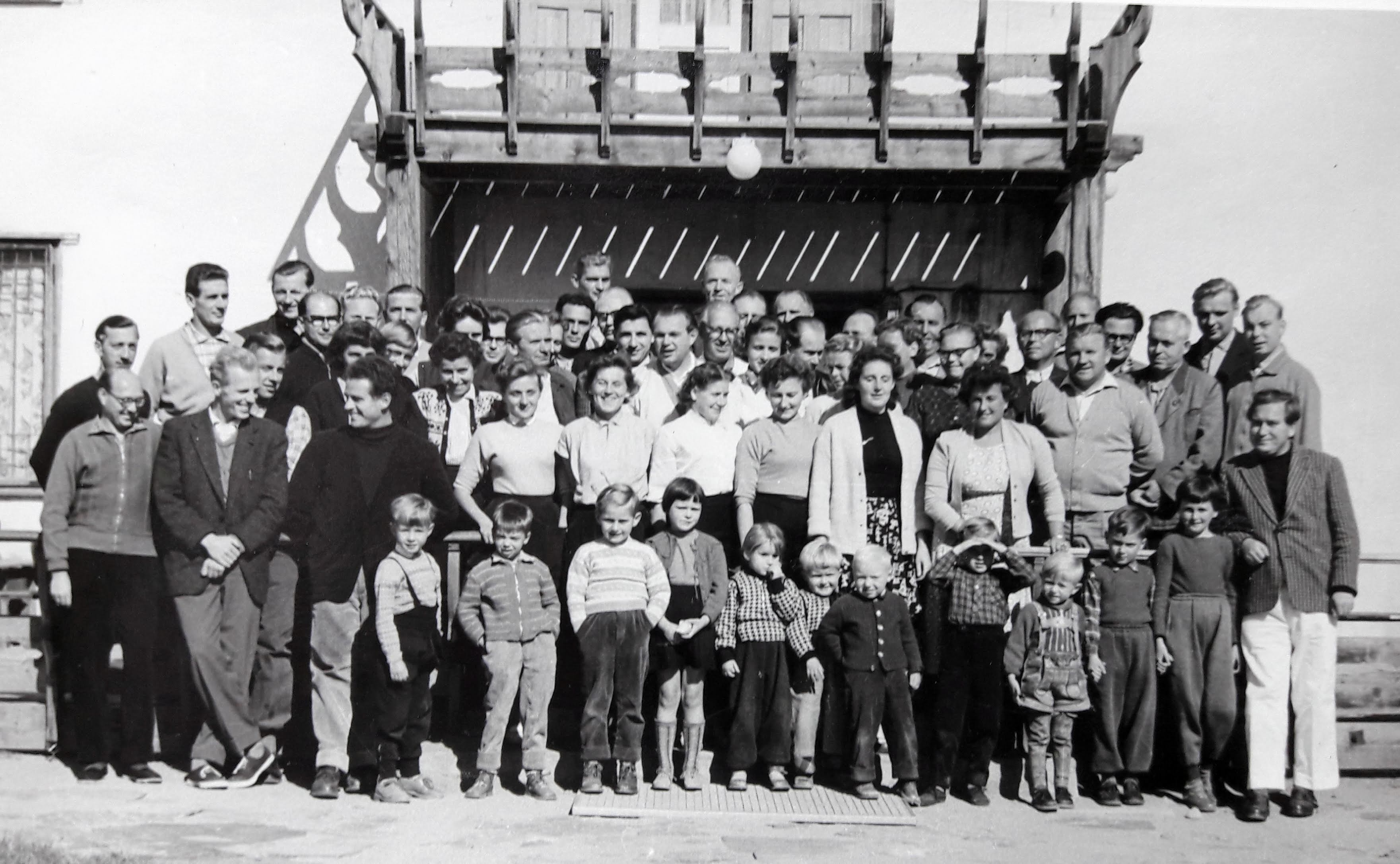
Deutsche Arbeitsgruppe (DAG) and their families in Hamhŭng c.1958. Püschel is in the second row of adults. In front of him is a woman in a white top with elbow-length sleeves, and in front of her is a boy with a striped cardigan.

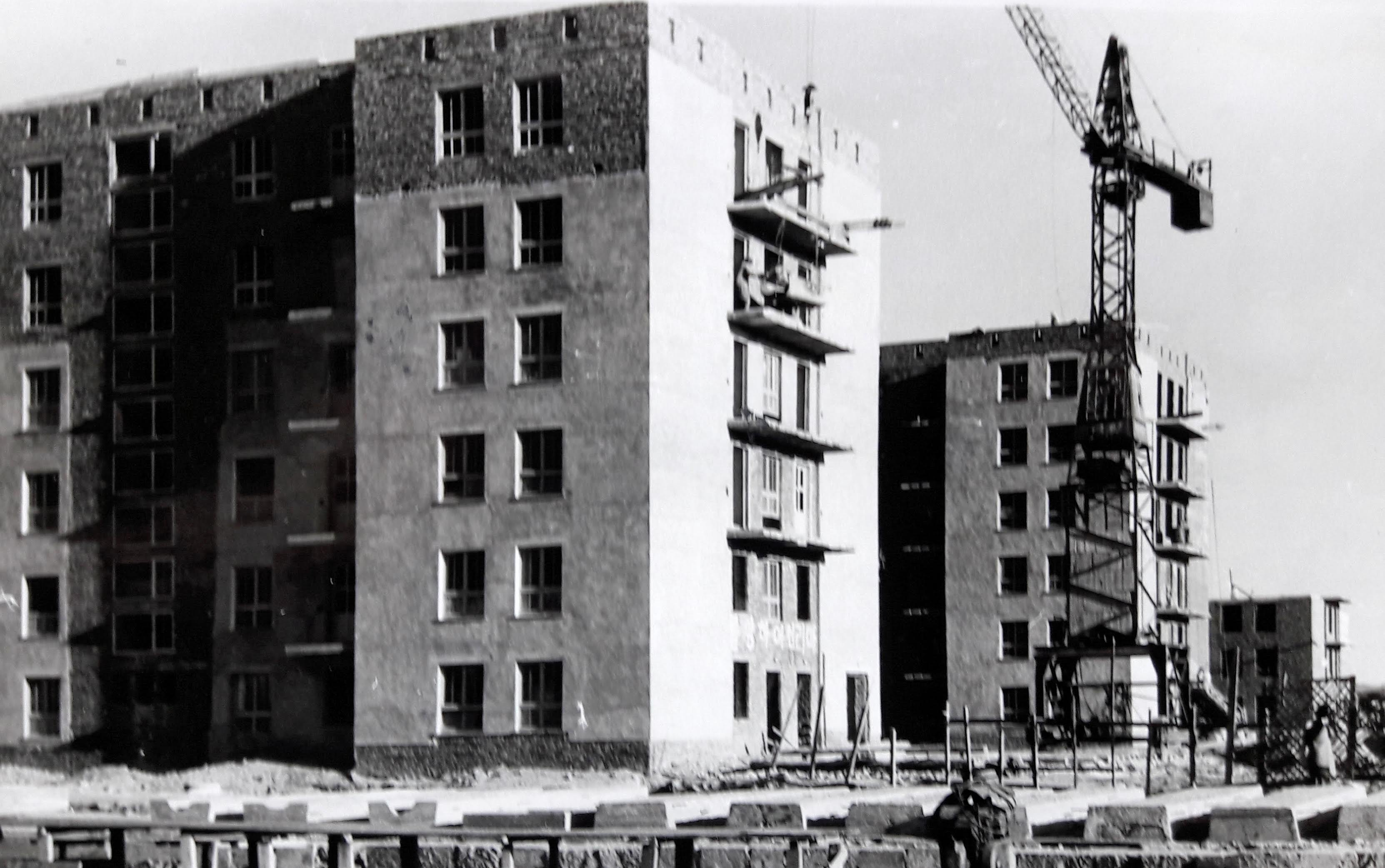
Construction site managed by East Germans in Hamhŭng, North Korea, 1958

In April 1948, Püschel's friend and fellow student from the Bauhaus Gustav Hassenpflug, Professor for City Planning at the Hochschule für Architektur und Bauwesen, a predecessor of the current Bauhaus University Weimar, helped him get a post as an assistant lecturer at the school. In 1960, Püschel founded the department of village planning, which he led as professor until retiring in 1972, after which he was an emeritus professor.

In addition to his academic career during which he wrote copiously on the development possibilities for rural settlements, Püschel created many unremarkable functional buildings in the effort to rebuild war-damaged East Germany and deal with its housing shortage.

=== North Korea ===
From 1955 to 1962, the East German government ran a large-scale programme to reconstruct the port cities of Hamhŭng and Hŭngnam, which had been severely damaged by US air raids during the Korean War. Called the Deutsche Arbeitsgruppe (DAG), the team consisted of city planners, architects, technical personnel, and craftsmen, who built residential and industrial areas, hospitals, schools, hotels, a concert hall, and an outdoor swimming pool. The work was funded by the East German government and donations from East German citizens.

Püschel was seconded from his job at the university to work on these projects from 1955 to 1959. He was accompanied by a group of about 175 members of the DAG. From 1955 to 1956, he was the head of city planning for the Hamhŭng project, and from 1956 to 1959, he worked on the sister project in Hŭngnam. In 1957, he was awarded the Order of Korean Labour for his work.

=== Restoration of Bauhaus Dessau building ===
In 1972, the East German government had the Bauhaus Dessau building listed as a historic monument. It had been damaged during World War II and unsympathetically repaired. Püschel led the restoration, which was completed in 1976. On 2 December 1976, 50 years after it first opened, the building was officially reopened for use as a science and culture centre, which included an exhibition of items from the Bauhaus, including some of Püschel's own student work.

Püschel went to considerable trouble to contact all known living former Bauhaus students and staff (Bauhäusler) to invite them to the reopening of the restored building to which 18 of them came.

=== Death ===
Püschel died in Weimar on 20 January 1997, at 89.

== Legacy ==
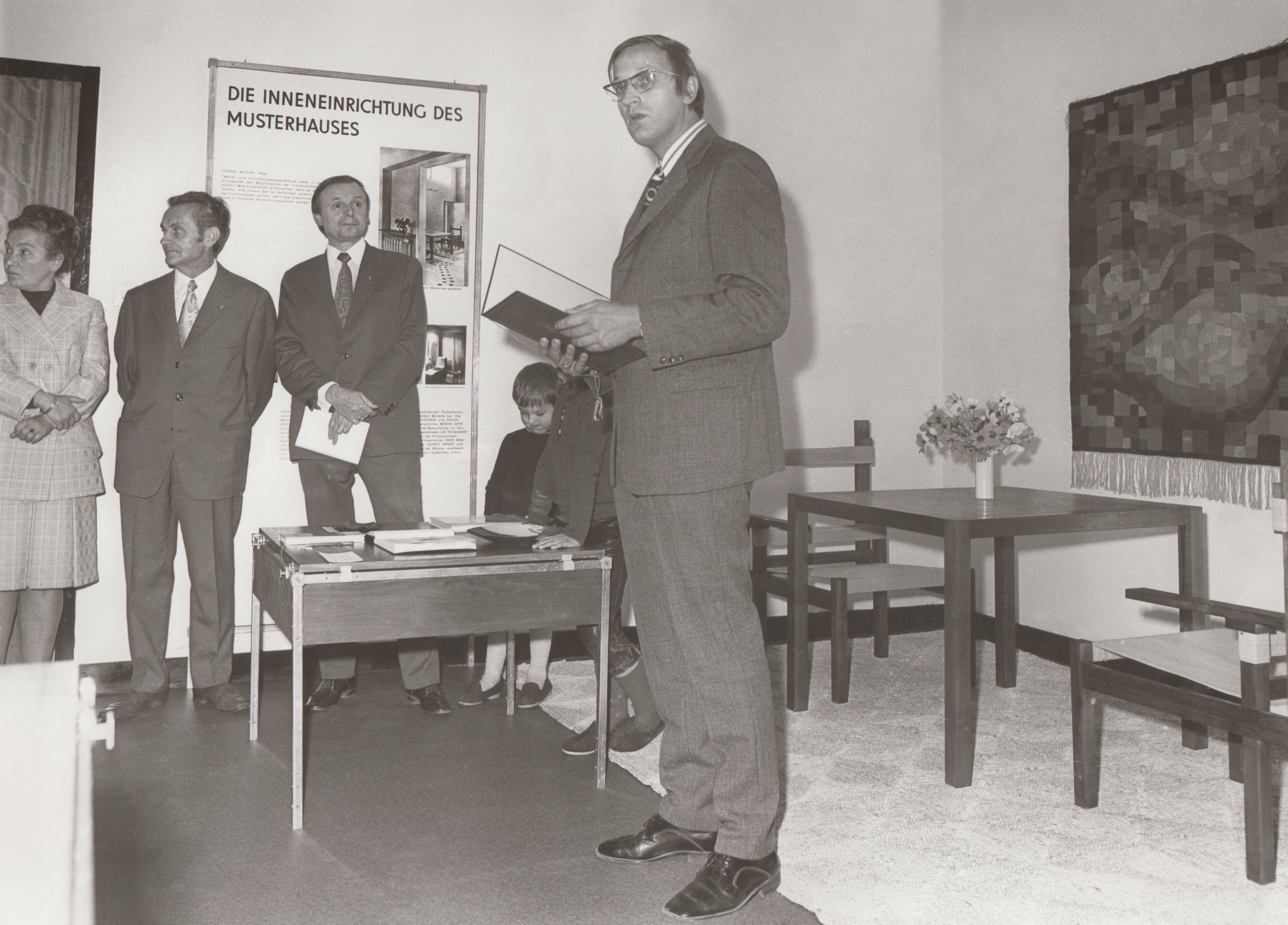
Lilo and Konrad Püschel, left, in the Haus am Horn, 26 Sept 1973, 50th jubilee of the Bauhaus "Werkschau" exhibition.

Püschel bequeathed 1,700 items comprising architectural drawings, studies, photographs, and correspondence to the Bauhaus Dessau Foundation, which are held in its archives. The collection provides a significant record of the training given at the Bauhaus and on the specific classes and workshops that he attended. The collection also sheds light on the activities of Hannes Meyer's "Red Bauhaus Brigade" in the Soviet Union and of former Bauhaus students' careers in East Germany and North Korea.

He wrote an autobiography, Wege eines Bauhäuslers (Paths of a Bauhaus student), published in 1997 shortly after his death, that describes in some detail study and social life at the Bauhaus, the work of the 'Red Bauhaus Brigade' in Moscow, life as a soldier in the Wehrmacht and as a prisoner of war in the hands of the Red Army, the work of the Deutsche Arbeitsgruppe in 1950s North Korea, and the 1970s restoration of the Bauhaus Dessau building.

The Bauhaus Dessau building that he led the restoration of and the ADGB Trade Union School and the Laubenganghäuser ('Houses with Balcony Access') that he worked on as a student are all part of the Bauhaus World Heritage Site.

== Exhibitions ==
- Ausstellung Konrad Püschel – Studienarbeiten am Bauhaus Dessau 1926–1930, Wissenschaftlich-kulturelles Zentrum Bauhaus Dessau vom 20.6.1981 bis 30.8.1981. This was an exhibition of Püschel's student work at the Bauhaus
- Examples of Püschel's student work were included in the MoMA exhibition Bauhaus 1919–1933: Workshops for Modernity, November 8, 2009 – January 25, 2010.
- bauhaus imaginista. Moving Away: The Internationalist Architect – Garage Museum of Contemporary Art, Moscow (12 September – 30 November 2018)

The Moving Away exhibition focused on students who were connected to the 'Red Bauhaus Brigade' with Hannes Meyer in the Soviet Union in the 1930s: architect and town planner Konrad Püschel; architect Philipp Tolziner, who spent the rest of his life in Moscow; and architect Lotte Stam-Beese, who was the first woman to study in the building department of the Bauhaus.

== See also ==
- Edmund Collein
- Sotsgorod: Cities for Utopia
