= South Hamgyong Sci-Tech Library =

Coordinates: 39°54′49″N 127°31′30″E

- 함경남도과학기술도서관
- Location: Hamhung, South Hamgyong Province, North Korea
- Type: Sci-Tech library
- Established: 2018 (8 years ago)

South Hamgyong Sci-Tech Library (Korean: 함경남도과학기술도서관) is a public library located in Hamhung, South Hamgyong Province, North Korea. South Hamgyong Sci-Tech Library was opened in 2018, and it is the first large-scale Sci-Tech library outside of Pyongyang.

According to Google Earth imagery, the South Hamgyong Sci-Tech Library was built on the site of the former South Hamgyong Cultural Exhibition House sometime between February 2016 and November 2016. The new building appears to be a mixture of architectural styles seen in Ryomyong New Town and Mirae Scientists Street, it contains two features resembling stylized hydrogen atoms, or planets with rings, on the roof, there is also a statue of a helium atom in front of the building.
