= Unjong-guyok =

District of Pyongyang

Ŭnjŏng-guyŏk 은정구역
- Guyŏk of Pyongyang

Korean transcription(s)
  - Hanja: 恩情區域
  - McCune-Reischauer: Ŭnjŏng-guyŏk
  - Revised Romanization: Eunjeongguyeok
- Location of Unjong-guyok within Pyongyang
- Coordinates: 39°12′20″N 125°51′50″E
- Country: North Korea
- Direct-administered city: P'yŏngyang-Chikhalsi

Area
  - Total: 34.32 km^{2} (13.25 sq mi)

Population (2008)
  - Total: 47,569
  - Density: 1,386/km^{2} (3,590/sq mi)

- Unjong-guyok
- Hangul: 은정구역
- Hanja: 恩情區域
- Revised Romanization: Eunjeongguyeok
- McCune–Reischauer: Ŭnjŏng-guyŏk

Ŭnjŏng-guyŏk, or Ŭnjŏng District is one of the 19 guyok which constitute the city of Pyongyang, North Korea. It is known for its scientific facilities. The district was named as such to honor the "benevolent affection (Korean word is Unjong)" and love of the Kim family towards the country's scientists.

== History ==
During the Joseon Dynasty, the regions that form the modern district were part of Ryongakbang (룡악방, 龍岳坊) of Pyongyang and Sunchon County. In 1896, it became a myeon of two different subdivisions, Pyongyang and Sunchon. The district was originally created in 1995 from parts of the region of the city of Pyongsong (which were Doksandong, Paesan-dong, Songryongdong, and Jikyongdong).

== Administrative divisions ==
As of 2002,Ŭnjŏng-guyŏk was divided into 4 tong (neighbourhoods):

- Kwahak 1-dong 과학1동(meaning science):University of Sciences is located here.
- Kwahak 2-dong 과학2동
- Paesan-dong 배산동(named after the Mountain called Paesan)
- Kwangmyŏng-dong 광명동(meaning bright light, suggesting a bright future brought by the scientists)

In 2014, these administrative divisions seem to have gone through an unexpected change before 2014, as North Korea mentions Ulmildong (乙密洞,을밀동, named after Ulmil Pavilion) and Wisongdong (衛星洞,위성동 named after korean word for satellites) as the district's neighbourhoods in the news about a high tech district being designated in the region while not mentioning Kwangmyŏng-dong(which might imply the kwangmyongdong subdivision was divided into ulmil dong and wisongdong).

== Awards ==
The city was awarded the title of model education district in 2018
