= Samuel S. Kim =

North Korean-born American political scientist and writer (1935–2026)

- Born: Samuel Soonki Kim; June 12, 1935; Hamhung, Korea, Empire of Japan
- Died: October 17, 2026 (aged 91); Long Branch, New Jersey, U.S.
- Education: Rhodes College; Columbia University
- Occupations: Political scientist, writer
- Spouse: Helen Wheaton Benham

Samuel Soonki Kim (June 12, 1935 – October 17, 2026) was a North Korean-born American political scientist and writer.

== Early life and career ==
Kim was born in Hamhung on June 12, 1935. He emigrated to South Korea in 1950, and he attended Rhodes College, earning his BA degree in international studies in 1960. He also attended Columbia University, earning his PhD degree in political science in 1966. After earning his degrees, he taught at Monmouth University and Princeton University, and was an adjunct professor in the department of political science at Columbia University.

As a writer, Kim wrote the books China, the United Nations, and World Order, The Quest for a Just World Order China In and Out of the Changing World Order, China in the Global Community, The Two Koreas and the Great Powers, China's Quest for National Identity, The International Relations of Northeast Asia and North Korean Foreign Relations in the Post-Cold War World.

== Personal life and death ==
Kim was married to Helen Wheaton Benham. Their marriage lasted until Kim's death in 2026.

Kim died at his home in Long Branch, New Jersey, on October 17, 2026, at the age of 91.
