= Hamhung University of Chemical Industry =

- 함흥화학공업대학
- Type: Public
- Established: September 15, 1947; 79 years ago
- Location: Hamhung, North Korea

Hamhung University of Chemical Industry is a university in Hamhung, North Korea. Founded in 1947, it was the first science and technology institute established in North Korea.

== See also ==
- List of universities in North Korea
