= German Working Group Hamhung =

East German architect and engineer group

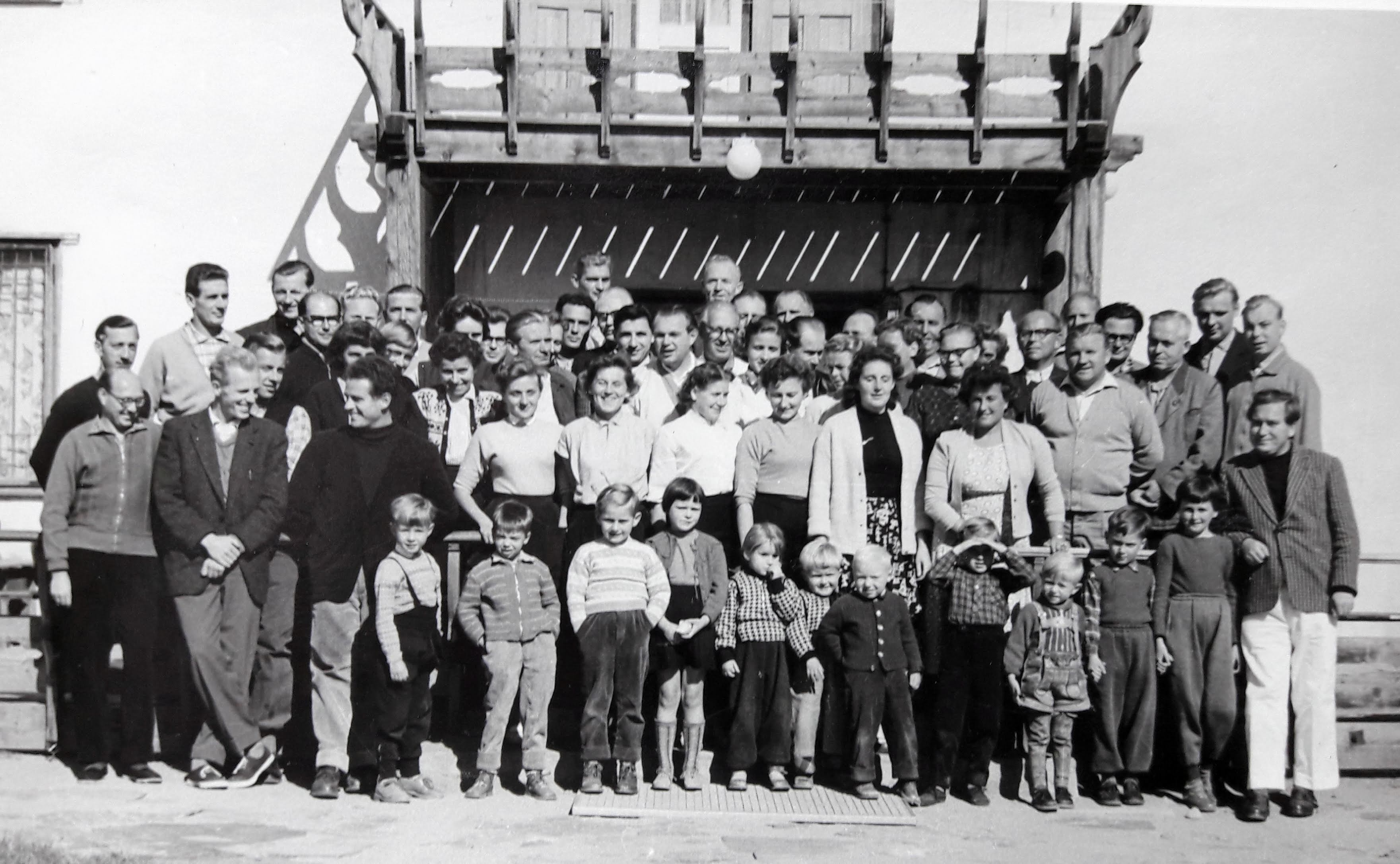
German Working Group Hamhung team members and their families around 1958

The Deutsche Arbeitsgruppe Hamhŭng, often known by its German acronym DAH or DAG (Deutsche Arbeitsgruppe), English as the German Working Group Hamhung or German Task Force Hamhung, was a group of engineers and architects sent by East Germany to North Korea in the 1950s and 1960s as part of a project to rebuild the city of Hamhung, which had been largely destroyed during the Korean War.

== Establishment of the working group ==
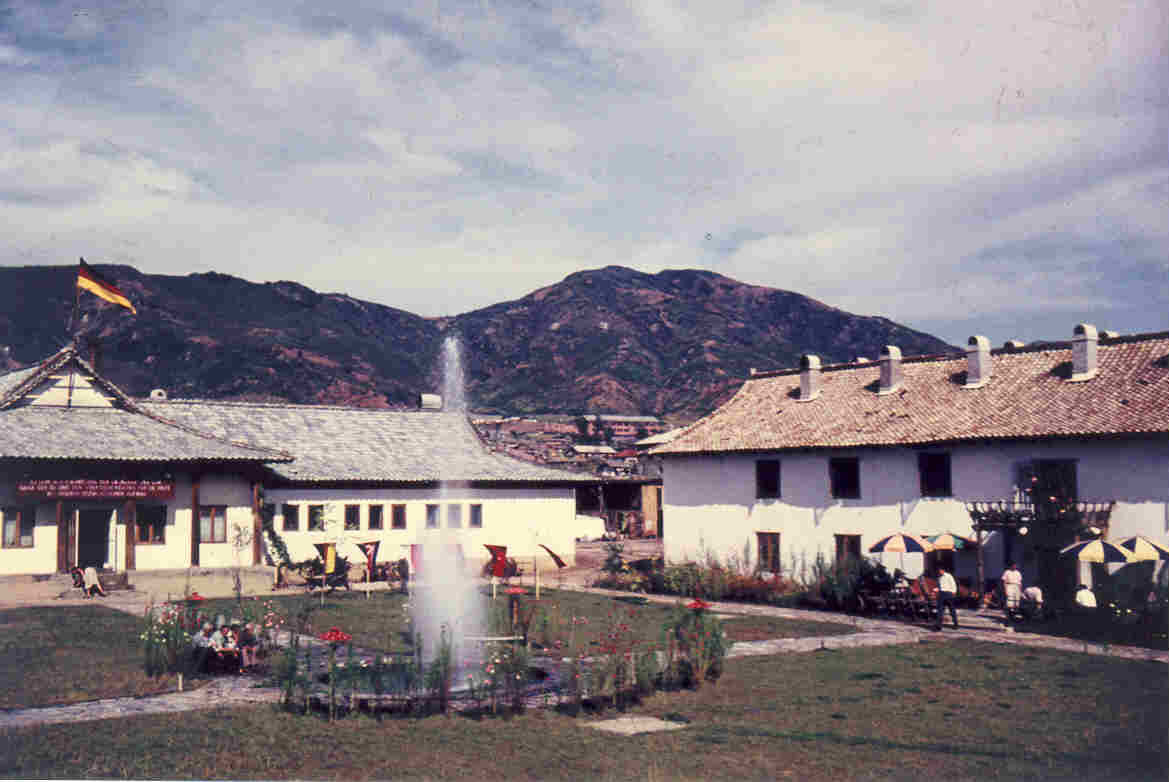
Accommodation and administrative buildings of the DAG in Hamhung

During the Japanese occupation of Korea, Hamhung was greatly developed as an industrial centre, as its location as a port on the east coast of the Korean peninsula made it highly strategically useful as a starting point for the Japanese colonial government's expansion towards the Chinese border. This strategic location also proved its downfall during the Korean War, as the American army deployed scorched earth tactics in destroying 80-90% of the city and its industrial infrastructure through bombing and naval artillery, whilst retreating from the Chinese military who had intervened in the conflict to support the Korean People's Army.

The North Korean foreign minister visited East Germany in 1954, at which time the Prime Minister Otto Grotewohl promised assistance to North Korea with the words "we'll build you a city" (German: Wir bauen Euch eine Stadt auf). When North Korean leader Kim Il Sung received news of this promise, he suggested the reconstruction of Hamhung as an industrial centre, as a joint project between the two socialist states.

After two East German delegations had visited Hamhung to gather information, the project was formalised on 17 February 1955 by the East German government. It was intended for the program to run for 10 years, in the form of scientific and technical support in planning and project management, in addition to training and mentorship of Korean workers in Hamhung. Delivery of building materials and infrastructure was also included. The "Construction Division Korea" (Baustab Korea) was created to manage the project from the East German side. A group of selected specialists were selected under the title Deutsche Arbeitsgruppe (DAG) and sent to Hamhung, including city planners, architects, geologists, and civil engineers specialising in various of construction ranging from roads, bridges, utilities to specific areas such as hospital construction.

The first members of the DAG were housed in rough conditions, initially living in tents until 4 two-storey buildings and a central administration building could be built of rammed earth to house them. Project manager was the architect Hans Grotewohl, son of the East German Prime Minister. In the years 1955-56, his wife Madleen Grotewohl managed the construction of multiple small residential buildings for the Korean staff, which consisted of engineers, architects and interpreters.

The Bauhaus educated architect and town planner Konrad Püschel was manager for town planning of the Hamhung project in 1955-56, then from 1956 to 1959 he worked on the sister project in Hungnam. On his arrival in Hamhung in 1955, he was accompanied by a team of 175 DAG workers. Püschel was awarded the Order of the National Flag by the North Korean government for his work.

== Projects and costs ==
One of the first buildings built with the help of the DAG was a middle school for 1,200 students, completed in 1956 and financed by donations from East German citizens. This school retained a partnership arrangement with a school in Dresden until the 1980s. For buildings erected by the North Koreans, the East Germans provided technical equipment, including a complete facility for building Plattenbau components for apartment buildings. Among other facilities provided by the East Germans were a clay pipe manufacturing plant, a tile and ceramic works and an industrial-scale carpentry works, to help with the improvement of Hamhung. Further to this, German-Korean cooperation saw the construction of residential and industrial areas, a new road network, electrical and water supply networks, sewage systems, schools and kindergartens, shops, a hotel, and theatre (or "House of Culture"), a tuberculosis hospital and factory for prosthetics, sport and recreational facilities, a swimming pool and the city's railway station.

The project ended after eight years, two years earlier than originally planned, partly due to changing political climate in light of North Korea and East Germany taking opposite sides in the Sino-Soviet split. The last German advisors returned to East Germany in 1962. The total amount invested by the East German government varies according to sources, ranging from 118 million to as much as 218.4 million East German marks.

== Intercultural aspects ==
Generally, deployment of German workers to Hamhung lasted about one year, however some remained two years or more. Many members of the DAG lived and worked in Hamhung without their families, although it was sometimes possible for the Construction Division to organise for family members to join them, and for spouses to be employed by the DAG. Children of DAG members were cared by their own childcare provider. Many friendships arose between German and Korean families.

Hamhung at that time had a population of around 170,000 inhabitants. The living and working conditions in North Korea were described by members of the DAG as "difficult". Some members found it increasingly difficult to complete tasks that were assigned to them. Social conflicts also arose between the Korean and German members due to language and cultural barriers. Some German workers were sent back to East Germany due to excessive alcohol consumption or sexual harassment of local Koreans; in the first year around 40% of the German workers were sent home within the first six months.

The North Korean media initially reported on the project as "brotherly cooperation", however this was later revised down to being "technical assistance", then later not communicated or discussed at all by the North Korean media, which was seen by the East German government as a sign of ungratefulness. In East Germany, the reconstruction of Hamhung was barely discussed by the media at all. Otto Grotewohl was made an honorary citizen of Hamhung for his role in the project.

A main street of Hamhung was initially named after East German President Wilhelm Pieck, however this was later renamed Jŏnsŏng Road ("Road of Loyalty"). The former German administrative buildings became the city planning office for Hamhung.
