= Chosŏnhwa =

North Korean art style

Chosŏnhwa (Korean: 조선화), meaning "Joseon painting" or "Korean painting", and also known as Juche realism, is the main artistic style of state sanctioned art in North Korea.

Chosŏnhwa seeks to modernize traditional brush-and-ink paintings within the stylistic and ideological criteria of Juche aesthetics. The North Korean ideology of Juche is a version of the socialist ideals with more emphasis on self-reliance of the state and the dominion of people over everything. Similarly, Juche realism is the localized North Korean adaptation of Socialist realism. Chosŏnhwa is the defining art style for North Korea's visual culture and embodies the needs and ideals of the state as it emerged from a turbulent post-colonial and post-war political climate. Chosŏnhwa serves as the singular representational art that the state allows where everything else is censored.

== History ==
=== Context ===
The Democratic People's Republic of Korea was founded in September 1948 with Kim Il Sung in charge and under heavy influence from the Soviet Union after the Japanese colonial rule of Korea was ended by their defeat by the United States in World War II. With the U.S in control of South Korea and the Soviet Union in control of North Korea, both sides sought victory over the other. The war drew to a stalemate that resulted in the signing of the Korean Armistice Agreement which ended the fighting with neither sided having achieved victory over the other. As a new post-colonial and now post-war nation, North Korea needed to tackle the task of creating a new national identity distinctive from the Soviet Union and Japan. Under the rule of Kim Il Sung, the state took the political, economic, and social ideals of Soviet socialism and bent them to its own needs creating the Juche ideology under which all aspects of North Korean life and functioning operate. Juche emphasizes the concept of self reliance, North Korea needed to become self reliant politically, and so they needed to be self reliant artistically as well.

=== Search for a national style ===
As North Korea began to search more within for a cultural identity, the rise of the Juche ideology, which emphasized the self-reliance of the state, a shift away from, and a repurposing of, Western forms of modernity began. Kim Il Sung and his son Kim Jong Il used Chosŏnhwa as the basis for the visual culture of North Korea, to make his rule distinct form that of both South Korea and the Soviet Union, and simultaneously distance North Korea from its colonial past. On one hand, brush-and-ink painting was considered more local and relevant to the nation building agenda than oil painting. On the other hand, the realistic style departed both from the premodern literati ink painting tradition and the colonial remnants of the Japanese Nihonga style, which was developed from the 19th century to create a pan-Asian style of art as a path to modernization alternate from that of the Western techniques. Chosŏnhwa incorporated this local material and realistic imagery, while preserving the use of bright colors and subjects in line with the ideals of the state, to create the core state-sponsored artistic practice of North Korea.

The main operational idea for the arts was Stalin's slogan "national in form and socialist in content", which was used a modus operandi in Socialist realism. In North Korea, an internal debate ensued over what art form would best embody this dogma while also representing North Korean ideals and identity. At first, oil painting was seen as the superior option, because it represented a modern way of making art in its material aspects, as well as being a very colorful medium. Color was initially important because, within the Soviet and Juche ways of thinking, art was meant to portray the clear and bright beauty of society. This was in opposition to traditional brush-and-ink style paintings which were seen as both primitive and dark. Because the dark monochromatic ink paintings did not match the tastes of the modern people of North Korea, oil was the preferred medium until Kim Il Sung and Kim Jong Il called for Chosŏnhwa to be the basis of all artistic endeavors. The embracing of oil and rejection of ink was a byproduct of the desire of the state to separate itself from its past in replacing its politics and culture with Soviet styles.

=== Formation of a national style ===
1966 marks the clearest point when the shift toward Chosŏnhwa ink paintings became apparent. Oil painting was then seen as too Western of a medium, especially as it was favored in South Korea. The North Korean state turned to ink painting as a more representative medium for the North Korean identity, but departed from the traditional monochromatic ink painting to cater to the same preference for color that oil did. Color became the main focus in the ideals surrounding Chosŏnhwa for a variety of reasons, which could simultaneously contradict with or contribute to the state's need for artistic self-reliance. A large aspect of Socialist realism was vibrant color and clarity of message to make the paintings more appealing to the common folk. At the same time, although vibrant color was also seen as a Western practice, it was also considered a modern style. This penchant for colorful works can also be traced back to Japan's Nihonga style, which remained an influence even though the goal was to separate the North Korean National identity from its colonial period. Chosŏnhwa, therefore, combined the vibrant colors of Socialist realism, oil painting, and Nihonga, which could be seen as modern and appealing, with the traditional medium of ink painting on paper.

Chosŏnhwa techniques have been taught at Pyongyang Art College, which was established in 1947. After graduating from Pyongyang Art College, graduates can join numerous art creation companies, get registered as a member of the Korean Artists Federation, and paid a salary for making art. These companies include the Central Art Creation Company, the Light Industrial Art Creation Company, the Art Creation Company, the Theatrical Art Creation Company, the Regional Art Creation Company, the People's Army Art Creation Company, the National Workers' Art Units, and the Mansudae Creation Company.

== Visual components ==
The main visual characteristics of Chosŏnhwa are the naturalistic representations of human figures or landscapes, the use of linear perspective, and shading. It is painted using colorful ink on Korean Hanji paper. The paper is made from the inner bark of mulberry trees and is highly absorbent. This makes for vibrant paintings with softer rendering. The main techniques outlined in Kim Jong Il's On Fine Art (1991), a treatise on proper art production in the DPRK, include composition, color, the one stroke technique, lines, tones, and linear perspective.

According to Kim, composition is important for creating a focal point while not overwhelming the painting with subjects, lines are good for outlining subjects, tones are necessary for creating three-dimensional space and getting good shading, and linear perspective is important for realism. Colors need to be handled with care since the pigments must be sourced in North Korea and in the paintings they need to work together while still remaining true to the original color of the subject.

=== Subject matter ===
Socialist realism in itself is a propagandistic art form meant to manipulate reality for the purpose for guiding the people's perceptions of an event, space, or person and to cater to the needs of the state. The main goal is to convince the common people that they are living the best of lives and ensure that they remain obedient and complacent when faced with reality. Since Socialist realism is at the core of the style of Chosŏnhwa, the subjects always push the ideological goals of the state, and appeal to the emotions of the viewers through drama or the relatably routine. These include depictions of idealized scenery, dramatic retellings of battles, glorified images of the every day or harsh manual labor of the people, the exaltation of political leaders, and abundance in agricultural pursuits.

Most often, the works are images of people working together or enduring together. The facial expressions of these people enduring or battling together are rarely more negative than determined resolution. Often the people are depicted as having an almost neutral expression in moments of crisis where they exude an air of tenacity in the face of adversity. This serves the purpose of painting a picture of the North Korean people taking on any burden with silent determination, which creates a role model of obedience for the general populace. The idyllic images of the heroic acts of the people and the nourishing land paint a fantasy of the perfect North Korea that is used by the state to hide the truth of its failure to create that utopia.

== See also ==
- Culture of North Korea
- List of art movements
- Socialist realism

== Bibliography ==
- Chŏng, Yŏn-sim, Sŏn-jŏng Kim, Kimberly Chung, and Keith B. Wagner, eds. Korean Art from 1953 : Collision, Innovation, Interaction. London: Phaidon Press Limited, 2020.
- Muhn, BG. 2018. North Korean Art : Paradoxical realism. Irvine, CA: Seoul Selection USA, Inc. https://search.ebscohost.com/login.aspx?direct=true&scope=site&db=nlebk&db=nlabk&AN=1945356
- Muhn, BG. 2019. North Korean Art : The Enigmatic World of Chosonhwa. Irvine, CA: Seoul Selection U.S.A. https://search.ebscohost.com/login.aspx?direct=true&scope=site&db=nlebk&db=nlabk&AN=2335332
- Frank, Ruediger. 2016. The Political Economy of North Korean Arts. [S.l.]: SSRN. https://ssrn.com/abstract=2881345.
- Hoffmann, Frank. “Brush, Ink, and Props: The Birth of Korean Painting.” Exploring North Korean Arts, 2011.
- Morley, Simon. 2022. “Signs of Optimism, Symptoms of Hope. North and South Korean Painting of the 1970s and 1980s. A Case Study.” World Art 12 (3): 287–310. doi:10.1080/21500894.2022.2110152.
- Kim Jong Il. 1991. On Fine Art.
- Kim, Yŏng-na. Korean Art since 1945 : Challenges and Changes. Leiden: Brill, 2024.
- Portal, Jane. Art under Control in North Korea. London: Reaktion, 2005. http://site.ebrary.com/id/10808207.
