= Kim Hyong Jik University of Education =

University in Pyongyang, North Korea

Coordinates: 39°00′33″N 125°47′04″E

- 김형직사범대학
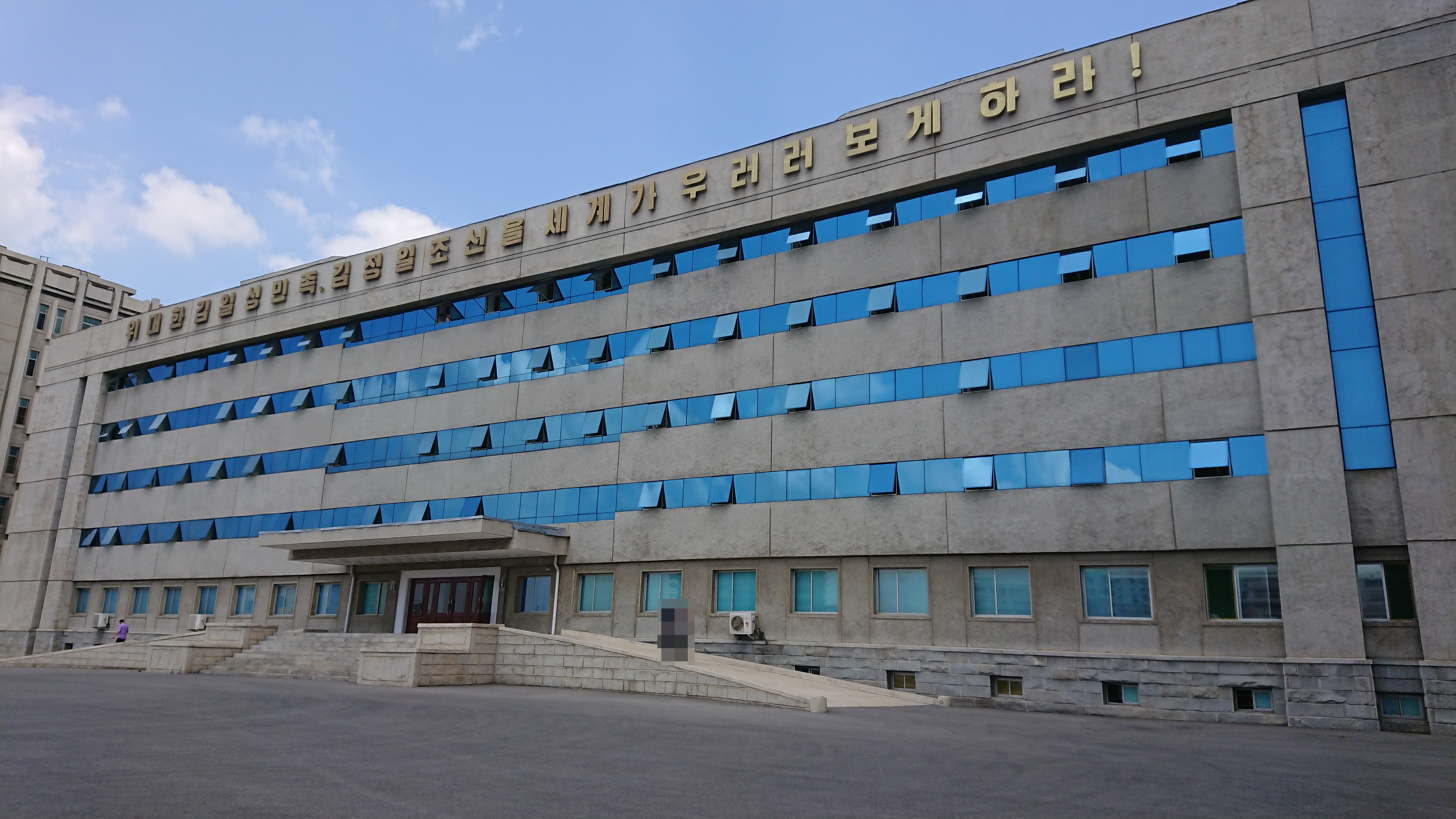
- Established: January 1, 1946; 80 years ago
- Location: Pyongyang, North Korea

Korean name
- Hangul: 김형직사범대학
- Hanja: 金亨稷師範大學
- RR: Gim Hyeongjik sabeom daehak
- MR: Kim Hyŏngjik sabŏm taehak

Kim Hyong Jik University of Education (Korean: 김형직사범대학) is a university in North Korea located in Tongdaewon-guyok, Pyongyang.

== History ==
The school started as the Pyongyang Teacher Training College (평양교원대학) on October 1, 1946, as a 2-year tertiary educational institution. In 1948 it was promoted to a 4-year degree as the Pyongyang University of Education. In 1972, the school was divided to Pyongyang University of Education No.1 and No.2, and No.1 became the current Kim Hyong Jik University of Education in 1975 after Kim Hyong-jik, father of Kim Il Sung. In 1980 it became a 5-year course.

== Notable achievements ==
The university is to improve on the quality of biology education and has opened 20 related departments.
