= Context art =

The term Context art (German: Kontextkunst) was introduced through the seminal exhibition and an accompanying publication Kontext Kunst. The Art of the 90s curated by Peter Weibel at the Neue Galerie im Künstlerhaus Graz (Austria) in 1993 (02.10.–07.11.1993).

== Exhibition and publication ==
Both exhibition and publication aimed to establish grounds for recognizing a new form of artistic practice emerging in the early 1990s. The presentation displayed different approaches though all shared an interest in the use of methods of contextualization to reveal connections between the art works and their conditions of production, whether these were formal, social, or ideologically defined. Institutional critique, feminist positions, later also critiques of precarious economic conditions and issues of globalization, all closely related to social and political changes, became relevant subjects of artistic production.

“It is no longer purely about critiquing the art system, but about critiquing reality and analyzing and creating social processes. In the ’90s, non-art contexts are being increasingly drawn into the art discourse. Artists are becoming autonomous agents of social processes, partisans of the real. The interaction between artists and social situations, between art and non-art contexts has led to a new art form, where both are folded together: Context art. The aim of this social construction of art is to take part in the social construction of reality.”

It might be due to the fact that the term was introduced under the German translation KontextKunst instead of Context Art or its likewise politically tended orientation (see Maria Lind's reference), but it never spread far beyond Europe's language based barriers. Instead vaguely similar strategies were labeled as Models of Participatory Practice in 1998 by Christian Kravagna's attempt to define the field or the later appearing and quite moderate Relational Art based on the 2002 book Relational Aesthetics by Nicolas Bourriaud.

The accompanying catalog is described to document ”a wide-ranging exhibition designed to illustrate the emergence over the past decade of a new international art movement, .. “ featuring “… an anthology of 22 substantial essays (some reprinted) discussing from diverse perspectives the artistic issues and social and political themes that distinguish Context Art from related forms of conceptual and installation art…. “.

== Participating artists ==
Fareed Armaly, Cosima von Bonin, Tom Burr, Clegg & Guttmann, Meg Cranston, Mark Dion, Peter Fend, Andrea Fraser, Inspection Medhermeneutics, Ronald Jones, Louise Lawler, Thomas Locher, Dorit Margreiter, Kasimir Malewitsch, Katrin von Maltzahn, Regina Möller, Reinhard Mucha, Christian Philipp Müller, Anton Olschwang, Hirsch Perlman, Dan Peterman, Adrian Piper, Mathias Poledna, Stephan Prina, Florian Pumhösl, Gerwald Rockenschaub, Julia Scher, Oliver Schwarz, Jason Simon, Rudolf Stingel, Lincoln Tobier, Olga Tschernyschewa, Christopher Williams, Peter Zimmermann, Heimo Zobernig
