= Pyongyang University of Fine Arts =

University in Pyongyang, North Korea

Coordinates: 39.0175°N 125.7940°E

- 평양미술대학
- Established: September 10, 1947; 78 years ago
- Location: Pyongyang, North Korea
- Campus: Urban

Pyongyang University of Fine Arts (Korean: 평양미술대학; Hanja: 平壤美術大學; lit. Pyongyang Art University) is an art university located in Tongdaewon District, Pyongyang, North Korea.

Pyongyang Art University is the most prestigious art university in the Democratic People's Republic of Korea, being awarded the Order of Kim Il Sung, the highest decoration award of North Korea. It is the foremost educational institute in the nation for teaching propaganda art or "Juche-art". Graduates of the university have included Kim Il Sung Prize winners, People's Artists, and Merited Artists.

The university is divided into several faculties and departments including the Graphic Art Faculty, Crafts Faculty, Industrial Art Faculty, Korean Painting (Joseonhwa 조선화) Faculty, Sculpture Faculty, Educational Faculty, Basic Art Science Faculty, Online Education Faculty, Social Sciences Department, and the Fine Arts Research Institute. The university also has an art museum.
