= Huichon =

City in Chagang Province, North Korea

Huichon 희천시
- Municipal City

Korean transcription(s)
  - Chosŏn'gŭl: 희천시
  - Hancha: 熙川市
  - McCune-Reischauer: Hŭich'ŏn si
  - Revised Romanization: Huicheon-si
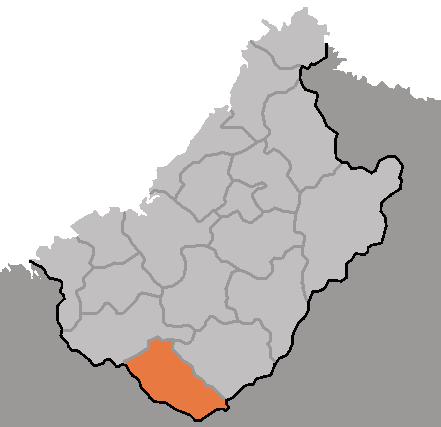
- Map of Chagang showing the location of Huichon
- Interactive map of Huichon
- Location within North Korea
- Coordinates: 40.1707°N 126.2761°E
- Country: North Korea
- Province: Chagang Province
- Administrative divisions: 21 tong, 12 ri

Population (2008)
  - Total: 168,180
  - Dialect: P'yŏngan
- Time zone: UTC+9 (Pyongyang Time)

Hŭich'ŏn (Korean pronunciation: [hɰi.tsʰʌn]) is a city in the southern part of Chagang Province, North Korea. The population is 168,180 (2008 data).

== History ==
The region surrounding the city became Huichon County in 1896. It was originally part of North Pyongan province during the Japanese colonial era. The county was originally divided into nine myons and 35 dongs at the time of the establishment of the newly created Chagang Province in January 1947, but the part of the eastern regions of the county break out of the administrative division to form Tongsin County in 1952. In October 1967, the county was promoted to city status. Huichon was formerly a small village. Since the Korean War and an influx of government investment, it has become a base for electronics and machinery production for North Korea. The region was particularly affected by the North Korean famine of the 1990s. Today, Huichon hosts the main University of Telecommunications of North Korea.

== Administrative divisions ==
Hŭich'ŏn is divided into 21 tong (neighbourhoods) and 12 ri (villages):

=== Neighborhoods (dong) ===
MR Name	RR Name	Hangul
Chisin-dong	Chisin-dong	치신동
Chŏnp'yŏng-dong	Cheonpyeong-dong	천평동
Chŏnsin-dong	Cheonsin-dong	천신동
Ch'ŏngch'ŏn-dong	Cheongcheon-dong	청천동
Ch'ŏngha-dong	Cheongha-dong	청하동
Ch'ŏngnyŏn-dong	Cheongnyeon-dong	청년동
Hup'yŏng 1-dong	Hupyeong 1-dong	후평 1동
Hup'yŏng 2-dong	Hupyeong 2-dong	후평 2동
Kalgol-dong	Kalgol-dong	갈골동
Kalhyŏn-dong	Kalhyeon-dong	칼현동
Kŭmsan-dong	Geumsan-dong	금산동
Maebong-dong	Maebong-dong	매봉동
Namch'ŏn-dong	Namcheon-dong	남천동
P'ungsan-dong	Pungsan-dong	풍산동
P'yŏngwŏn-dong	Pyeongwon-dong	평원동
Sinhŭng-dong	Sinhung-dong	신흥동
Solmoru-dong	Solmoru-dong	솔모루동
Sŏmun-dong	Seomun-dong	서문동
Taehŭng-dong	Taeheung-dong	태흥동
Yŏkchŏn-dong	Yeokcheon-dong	역천동
Yŏkp'yŏng-dong	Yeokpyeong-dong	역평동

=== Villages (ri) ===
MR Name	RR Name	Hangul
Ch'angp'yŏng-li	Changpyeong-ri	창평리
Ch'ŏngsang-ri	Cheongsang-ri	청상리
Kuksŏng-ri	Gukseong-ri	국성리
Kwandae-ri	Gwandae-ri	관대리
Masŏl-li	Maseol-ri	마설리
Myŏngdae-ri	Myeongdae-ri	명대리
Namsil-li	Namsil-ri	남실리
Puhŭng-ri	Puheung-ri	부흥리
Ryujung-ri	Ryujung-ri	류중리
Sangsŏ-ri	Sangseo-ri	상서리
Songji-ri	Songji-ri	송지리
Tongmul-li	Tongmul-ri	동물리

== Transportation ==
Hŭich'ŏn is served by an express highway to Pyongyang and by the Manpo Line railway.

Huichon has a seven-kilometre-long (4 1/2-mile) trolleybus line, which had fallen into disrepair by 2015, but was subsequently restored, receiving new Chollima-321 trolleybuses in 2019 or 2020.

== Economy ==
The major industries are automotive and machinery manufacturing, including the Huichon Machine Tool Factory, Huichon Silk Mill and Huichon Hard Glassware Factory. Because of its strategic inland location, Hŭich'ŏn is also a site for ordnance manufacturing.

=== Huichon Machine Tool Factory ===
The Korea General Machinery Trading Corporation operates the Huichon Machine Tool Factory, North Korea's government-run manufacturer of heavy-duty machine tools for domestic use and for export (although most exports are blocked by UN embargoes).

The factory group was founded in 1955 and is involved in machine tool production processes including steel-making, casting, processing, assembly, painting and packing. Products are produced on a serial basis and a small lot basis; its output of precision machine tools includes an assortment of spline-grinding machines and industrial lathes.

The creation of the complex was firstly discussed in a March 1951 Workers' Party of Korea Central Committee meeting. Kim Il Sung said "In the course of the war, I have learned a bloody lesson that we should produce our own munitions and weapons. I keenly feel that we must have a solid machine-building industry in a far-sighted way." Two locations were cited for this purpose: Tokchon and Huichon.

Once built, the factory became a model for the machine-building industry of the country. Machine factories have been built in Taean, Ragwon, Tokchon, Ryongsong, Kusong and other parts of the country were built on the Hŭich'ŏn model. According to questionable DPRK government figures, (as of 1998) machine-building industry in North Korea had increased 1690 times compared with the pre-liberation figure, and its self-sufficiency in machinery was already 98 per cent.

=== Huichon Silk Mill ===
The Huichon Silk Mill is a state-run factory which produces silk thread, renowned as a Korean specialty since antiquity. Work was completed on the building in September 1988. It was constructed on the bank of the Chongchon River.

The team charged with the initial process of silk thread production sort the cocoons and remove cocoons with decayed chrysalises in them. Government mandates are strict: the cocoon-boiling and silk-reeling workteams must strive to increase thread production. The machinists of the cocoon-boiling workteams must "raise the actual utility rate" by rationally regulating the temperature in boiling cocoons.

At the silk reeling workshop, the workers in charge of finding the ends of cocoon threads must examine all the ends of cocoon threads to ensure there is no waste. The silk reelers are responsible for many pots, and must meet goals by "raising their technological level" and surpassing their monthly production plans.

The Chongchongang-brand silk threads have been exported to many countries, although UN embargoes have crippled the silk trade in recent years.

=== Huichon Hard Glassware Factory ===
The Huichon Hard Glassware Factory consists of the main building, and supplementary one on an area of about 12,000 square metres. It can annually produce over ten million glassware of different kinds.

The facility has a glass fusion furnace, a press-plastic machine, a centrifugal plastic machine, and many raw materials.

The factory produces various kinds of glassware for home use. They are supplied to households in Pyongyang, Chagang Province and other parts of the country.

== Hydroelectric power ==
Huichon contains a number of small hydroelectric power plants surrounding it as well as a major hydroelectric plant (Huichon No. 2) which was completed in April 2012, seven years ahead of schedule. Its main purpose is to supply steady electricity to Pyongyang (175 km to the southeast). It has a power generation capacity of about 300 MWe.

In December 2012, a report surfaced that the Huichon No. 2 Power Station had severe structural problems and was leaking. The problems are so large that Pyongyang now receives as little as five hours of electricity a day. According to the Radio Free Asia report, an anti-communist radio keep by United States, "Only the Kim idolization facilities, apartments for Central Party officials, the [43-story] Koryo Hotel and [the new] Changjeon St. [housing development] have 24-hour electricity, while the districts where ordinary people live can only use electricity for five hours a day."

A South Korean news source, The Chosun Ilbo, also reported that when Kim Jong-il learned of the problems, he flew into a fit of rage, ordered severe punishments for those involved and subsequently died from a heart attack as a result.

== Climate ==
Huichon has a humid continental climate (Köppen climate classification: Dwa).

Climate data for Huichon (1991–2020 normals, extremes 1976–present)
Month	Jan	Feb	Mar	Apr	May	Jun	Jul	Aug	Sep	Oct	Nov	Dec	Year
Record high °C (°F)	10.0 (50.0)	15.4 (59.7)	23.9 (75.0)	30.5 (86.9)	34.0 (93.2)	35.7 (96.3)	37.3 (99.1)	37.8 (100.0)	32.6 (90.7)	31.1 (88.0)	22.0 (71.6)	12.0 (53.6)	37.8 (100.0)
Mean daily maximum °C (°F)	−0.9 (30.4)	2.4 (36.3)	8.8 (47.8)	16.9 (62.4)	23.3 (73.9)	27.3 (81.1)	28.9 (84.0)	29.4 (84.9)	25.5 (77.9)	18.6 (65.5)	8.4 (47.1)	0.2 (32.4)	15.7 (60.3)
Daily mean °C (°F)	−8.5 (16.7)	−4.2 (24.4)	2.2 (36.0)	9.7 (49.5)	16.1 (61.0)	20.9 (69.6)	23.8 (74.8)	23.8 (74.8)	18.2 (64.8)	10.6 (51.1)	2.2 (36.0)	−6.2 (20.8)	9.0 (48.2)
Mean daily minimum °C (°F)	−14.3 (6.3)	−10.3 (13.5)	−3.3 (26.1)	3.1 (37.6)	9.8 (49.6)	15.6 (60.1)	20.0 (68.0)	19.5 (67.1)	12.8 (55.0)	4.5 (40.1)	−2.7 (27.1)	−11.0 (12.2)	3.6 (38.5)
Record low °C (°F)	−30.0 (−22.0)	−24.7 (−12.5)	−18.3 (−0.9)	−8.3 (17.1)	0.5 (32.9)	6.4 (43.5)	12.6 (54.7)	8.1 (46.6)	−1.7 (28.9)	−7.5 (18.5)	−16.7 (1.9)	−24.5 (−12.1)	−30.0 (−22.0)
Average precipitation mm (inches)	8.2 (0.32)	15.4 (0.61)	23.6 (0.93)	45.9 (1.81)	75.8 (2.98)	110.9 (4.37)	295.6 (11.64)	255.7 (10.07)	89.6 (3.53)	56.7 (2.23)	52.4 (2.06)	21.3 (0.84)	1,051.1 (41.38)
Average precipitation days (≥ 0.1 mm)	3.5	4.3	5.4	6.8	8.9	10.6	13.6	11.6	6.7	6.2	7.4	6.0	91.0
Average snowy days	5.1	4.7	3.8	0.6	0.0	0.0	0.0	0.0	0.0	0.1	3.3	7.4	25.0
Average relative humidity (%)	76.4	72.6	69.5	68.2	71.6	76.9	83.6	82.5	78.7	76.3	78.4	78.5	76.1
Source 1: Korea Meteorological Administration
Source 2: NOAA (extremes)

== In popular culture ==
Huichon is featured in the 2011 North Korean film Wish, where the character of the father is stationed while working on the construction of a power plant.

== See also ==
- Administrative divisions of North Korea
- Geography of North Korea
