= Hamhung =

Municipal City in South Hamgyong Province, North Korea

Hamhŭng 함흥시
- Municipal City

Korean transcription(s)
  - Chosŏn'gŭl: 함흥시
  - Hancha: 咸興市
  - McCune-Reischauer: Hamhŭng-si
  - Revised Romanization: Hamheung-si
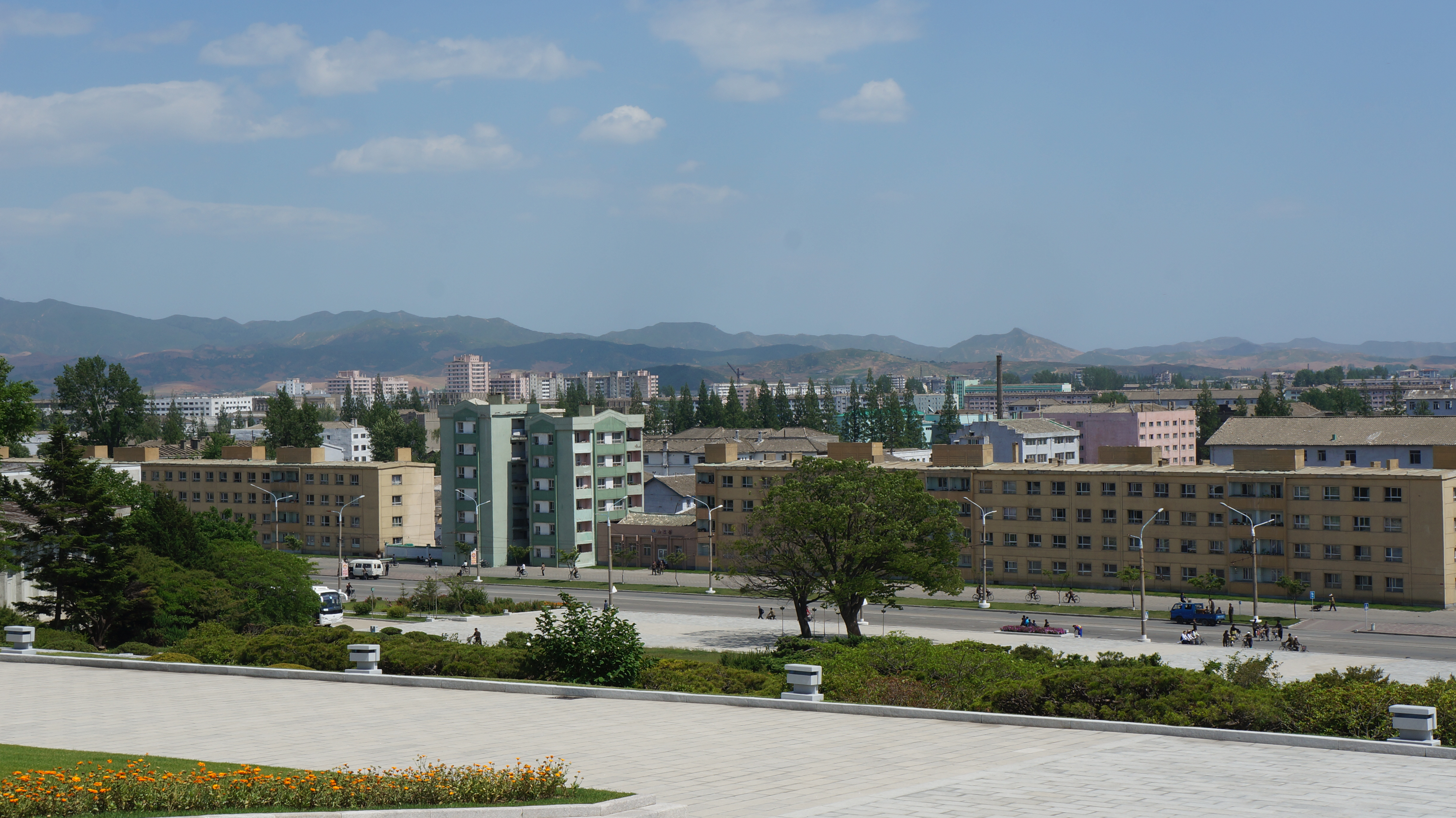
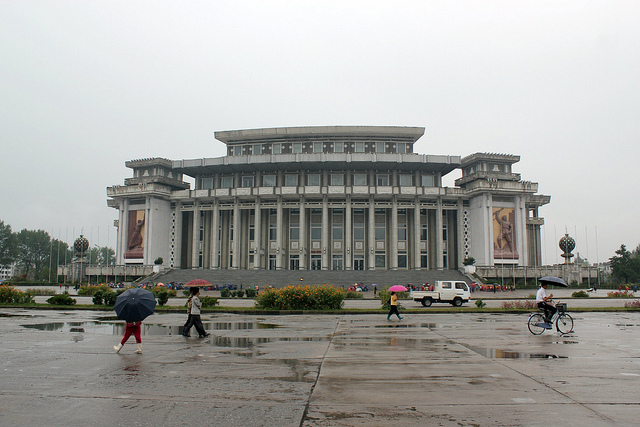
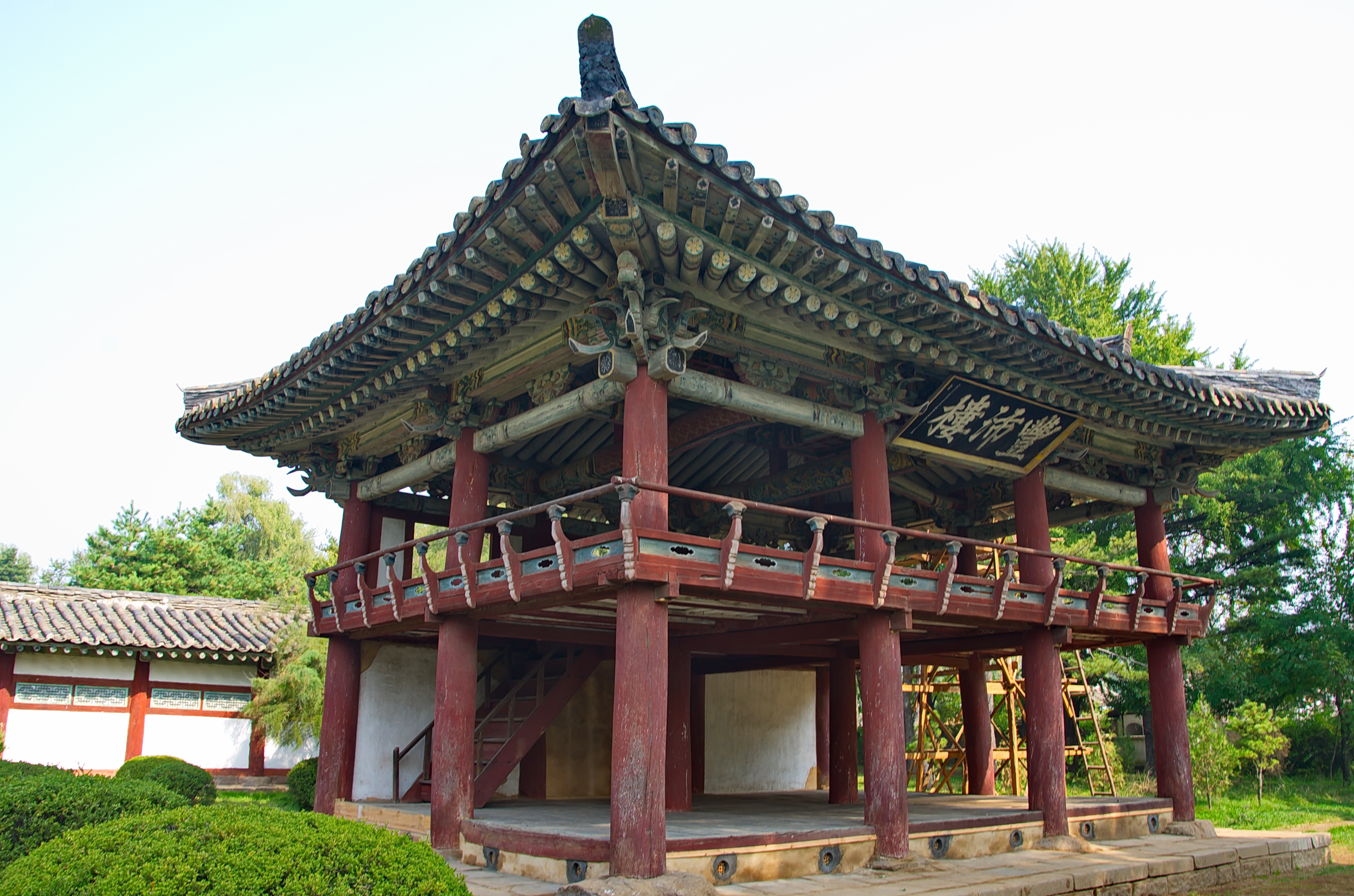
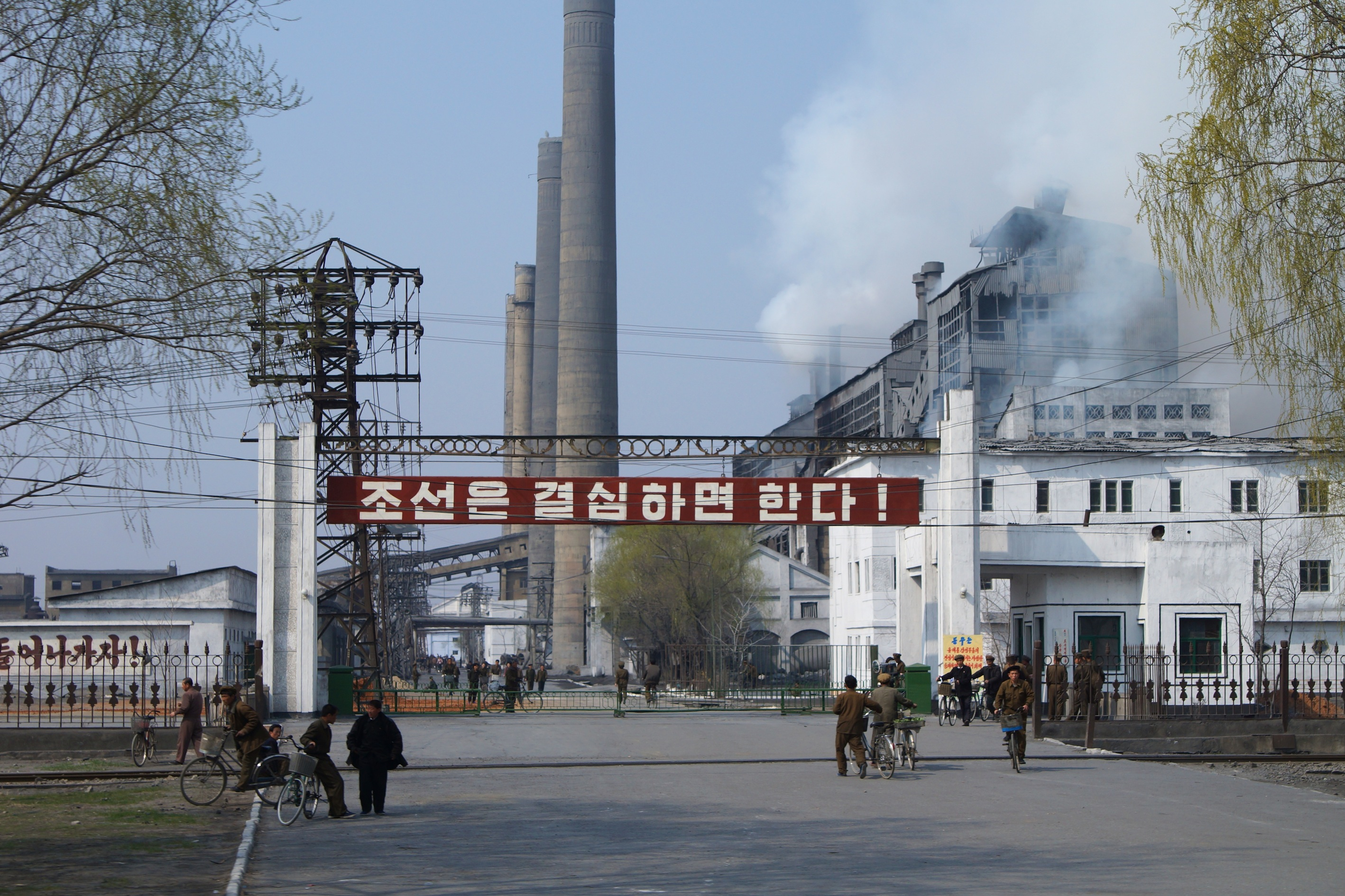
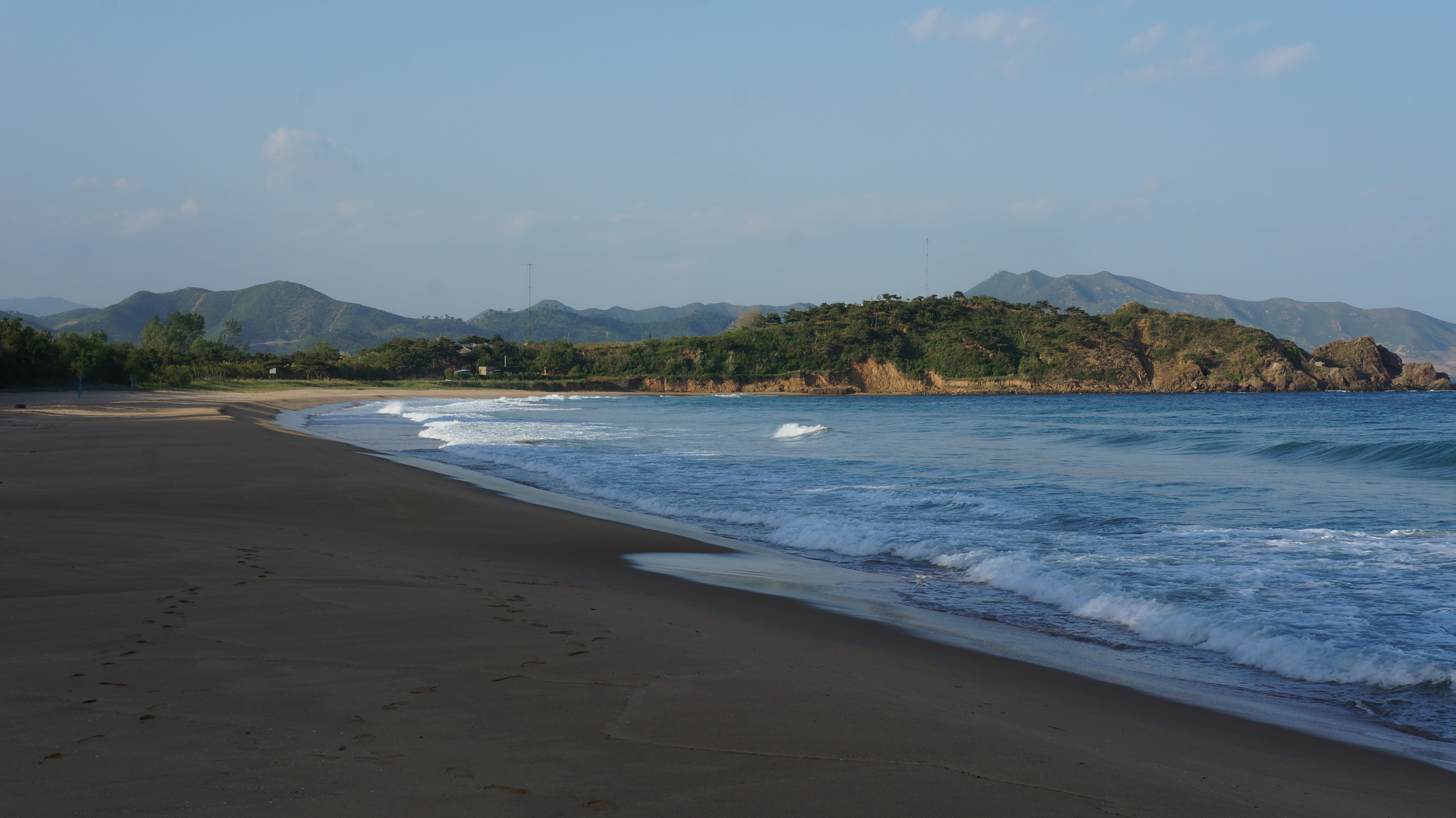
- View of Hamhung city Hamhung Grand Theatre Hamhung Royal Villa An industrial plant in Hamhung Majon Beach Resort

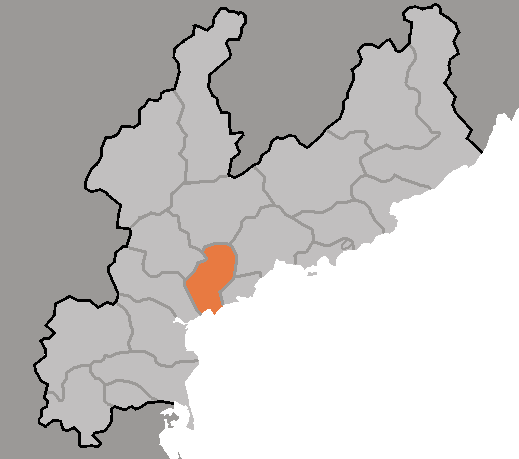
- Map of South Hamgyong showing the location of Hamhung
- Interactive map of Hamhŭng
- Location within North Korea
- Coordinates: 39°55′N 127°32′E
- Country: Democratic People's Republic of Korea
- Region: Kwannam
- Province: South Hamgyong
- Administrative divisions: 7 kuyok

Area
  - Total: 330 km^{2} (130 sq mi)

Population (2008)
  - Total: 768,551
  - Density: 2,328/km^{2} (6,030/sq mi)
  - Dialect: Hamgyŏng
- Time zone: UTC+9 (Pyongyang Time)

Hamhŭng (Hamhŭng-si; Korean pronunciation: [hamɣɯŋ]) is North Korea's second-largest city, and a major port city and industrial hub. Hamhung is the capital of South Hamgyŏng Province and the 16th largest city in the Korean Peninsula. Located in the southern part of the South Hamgyong Province, Hamhung is the main and most populous metropolitan area in the province. Hamhung was centrally planned and built by the North Korean Government.

== Administrative divisions ==
Hamhŭng is divided into 7 guyŏk (wards):

- Haean-guyŏk
- Hoesang-guyŏk
- Hŭngdŏk-guyŏk
- Hŭngnam-guyŏk (Hungnam-si until 2005)
- Sap'o-guyŏk
- Sŏngch'ŏn'gang-guyŏk (Sŏngch'ŏn-guyŏk until 1990)
- Tonghŭngsan-guyŏk (Pallyong-guyŏk until 1977)

== Geography ==
Hamhŭng is on the left branch of the Ch'ŏngch'ŏn River, on the eastern part of the Hamhŭng plain (함흥평야), in South Hamgyŏng Province, northeast North Korea. Its highest point is Mount Tonghŭng.

=== Climate ===
Hamhung has a humid continental climate (Köppen climate classification), with warm, humid summers, and moderately cold, dry winters. Being located by the Sea of Japan, its climate is directly influenced by it, resulting in warmer winters and cooler summers than areas similar in latitude on the western coast. The longer period of warmer temperatures favors the growing of crops.

Climate data for Hamhung (1991–2020)
Month	Jan	Feb	Mar	Apr	May	Jun	Jul	Aug	Sep	Oct	Nov	Dec	Year
Mean daily maximum °C (°F)	2.8 (37.0)	5.2 (41.4)	10.4 (50.7)	17.4 (63.3)	22.3 (72.1)	25.3 (77.5)	27.7 (81.9)	28.1 (82.6)	24.8 (76.6)	19.5 (67.1)	11.5 (52.7)	4.8 (40.6)	16.7 (62.1)
Daily mean °C (°F)	−3.4 (25.9)	−1.0 (30.2)	4.2 (39.6)	10.8 (51.4)	16.0 (60.8)	19.8 (67.6)	23.1 (73.6)	23.5 (74.3)	19.0 (66.2)	12.8 (55.0)	5.4 (41.7)	−1.2 (29.8)	10.8 (51.4)
Mean daily minimum °C (°F)	−9.0 (15.8)	−6.7 (19.9)	−1.3 (29.7)	4.6 (40.3)	10.3 (50.5)	15.6 (60.1)	19.6 (67.3)	19.9 (67.8)	14.3 (57.7)	7.3 (45.1)	0.2 (32.4)	−6.3 (20.7)	5.7 (42.3)
Average precipitation mm (inches)	12.3 (0.48)	11.2 (0.44)	20.3 (0.80)	44.9 (1.77)	72.2 (2.84)	85.3 (3.36)	205.0 (8.07)	172.8 (6.80)	95.8 (3.77)	41.8 (1.65)	49.4 (1.94)	19.0 (0.75)	830.0 (32.68)
Average precipitation days (≥ 0.1 mm)	3.6	3.1	4.3	5.4	7.4	8.5	12.4	10.9	6.9	4.6	5.5	3.3	75.9
Average snowy days	4.4	3.5	3.4	0.3	0.1	0.0	0.0	0.0	0.0	0.0	1.3	3.4	16.4
Average relative humidity (%)	63.6	61.2	61.4	61.2	69.4	78.7	84.0	84.7	79.9	71.3	67.0	63.7	70.5
Source: Korea Meteorological Administration

== History ==
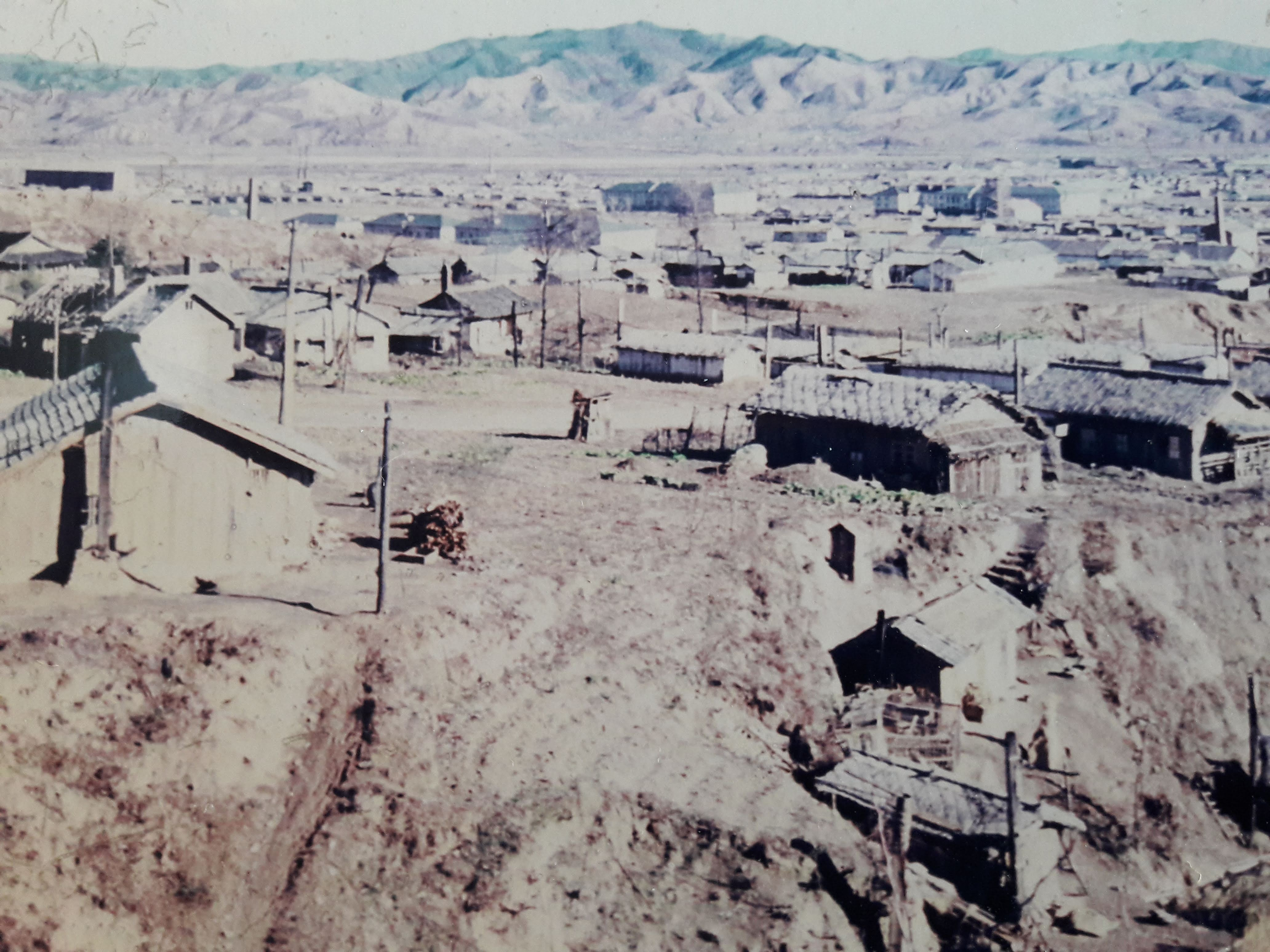
War damaged Hamhŭng in 1958

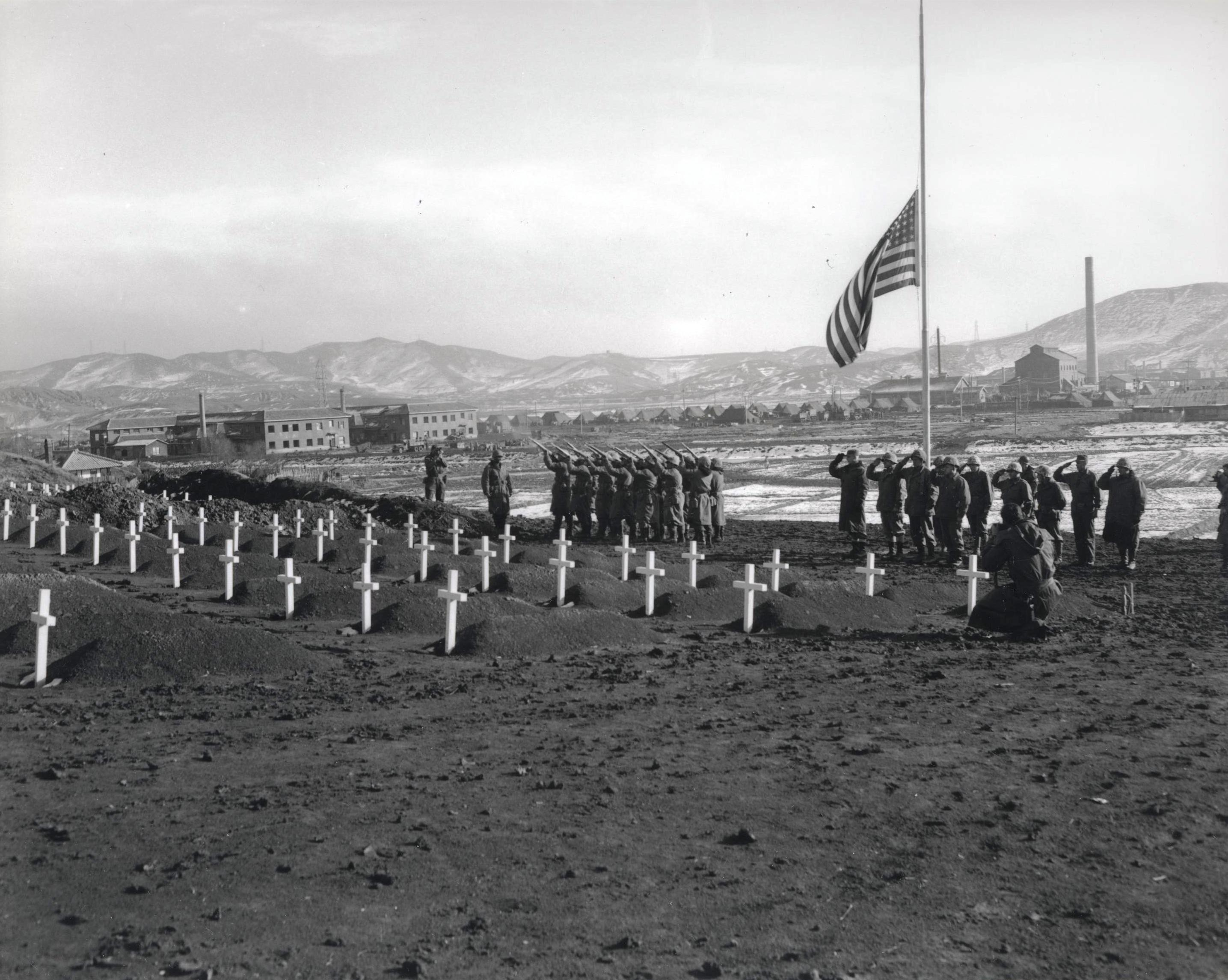
Marines of the 1st Marine Division pay their respects to fallen marines during memorial services at the division's cemetery at Hamhung, Korea, following the break-out from Chosin Reservoir, 13 December 1950

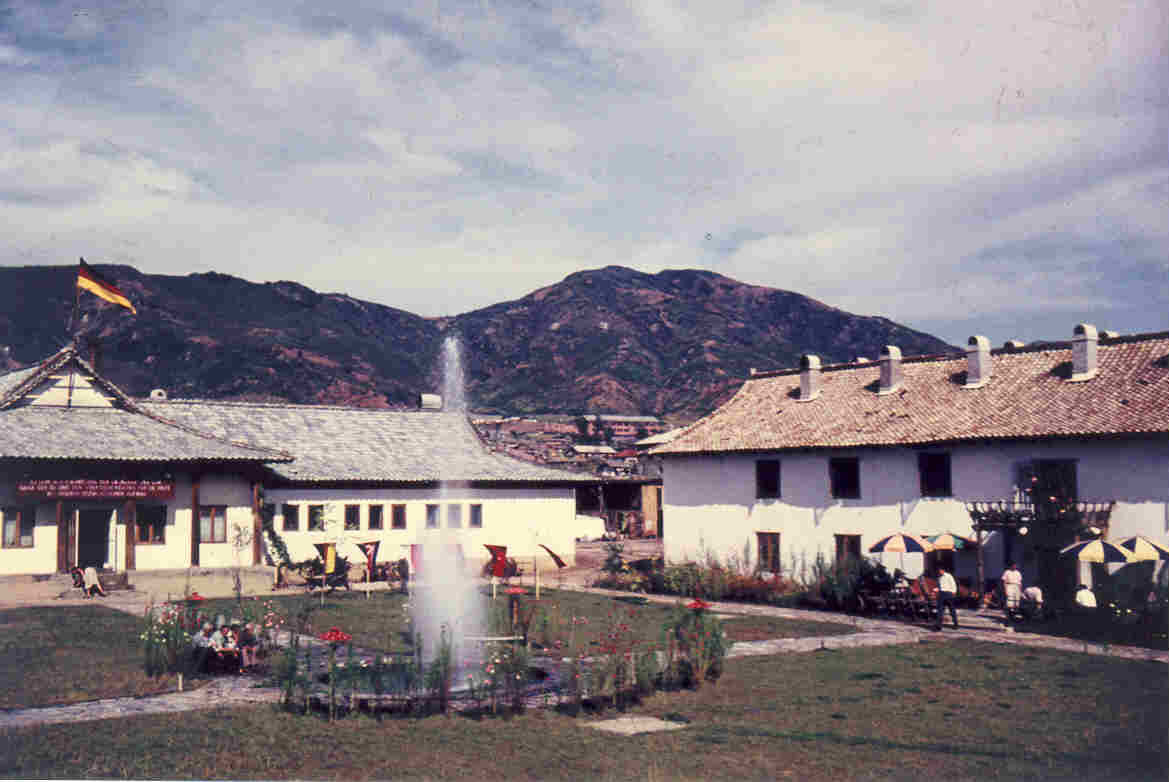
The office of the German Working Group Hamhung (DAG) in 1958

The city was called either Hamju (as recorded in 1108, the third year of King Yejeong) or Hamjumok (as recorded in 1369, 18th year of King Gongmin). It received its current name of Hamhung in 1416, when it was promoted to a 'bu'. The Sino-Korean word '흥' (Hancha: 興), added to the original name of Hamju, means that the town would prosper.

Yi Seong-gye, founder of the Yi dynasty, retired to the city after a successful palace coup by his son Yi Bang-won in 1400. Though his son sent envoys to reconcile, his father had them killed. A modern Korean expression, 'King's envoy to Hamhŭng' (Korean: 함흥차사; Hanja: 咸興差使; RR: Hamheungchasa; MR: hamhŭngchasa), refers to a person who goes on a journey and is never heard from again. It was known as Kankō during Japanese rule of Korea between 1910 and 1945. It was liberated by the Red Army on 22 August 1945.

The city was 80–90% destroyed by American air raids during the Korean War (1950–1953) and was occupied by ROK troops between 17 October 1950 and 17 December 1950. From 1955 to 1962, Hamhŭng was the object of a large-scale program of reconstruction and development by East Germany including the build-up of construction-related industries and intense training measures for Korean construction workers, engineers, city planners and architects. When the Bauhaus trained architect Konrad Püschel, the first Head of City Planning for the reconstruction project arrived in 1955, he was accompanied by about 175 members of the Deutsche Arbeitsgruppe (DAG) or German Working Group Hamhung as the project team was called. The project ended two years earlier than scheduled and with a low profile because of the Sino-Soviet conflict and the opposing positions that North Korea and East Germany took on that issue.

From 1960 to 1967, Hamhŭng was administered separately from South Hamgyŏng as a Directly Governed City (Chikhalsi). Before 1960 and since 1967, the city has been part of South Hamgyŏng Province.

In 1995, Hamhŭng witnessed, thus far, one of the only documented challenges to the North Korean government when famine-ravaged soldiers began a march toward Pyongyang. The revolt was quelled, and the unit of soldiers was disbanded.

The North Korean famine of the 1990s appears to have had a disproportionate effect on the people of Hamhung. Andrew Natsios, a former aid worker, USAID administrator, and author of The Great North Korean Famine, described Hamhung as "the city most devastated by [the] famine." Contemporary published reports from The Washington Post and Reuters describe numerous fresh graves on the surrounding hillsides and report that many of Hamhung's children were stunted by malnutrition. One survivor claimed that more than 10% of the city's population died, with another 10% fleeing the city in search of food. Despite previously being closed to foreigners, foreign nationals can now travel to Hamhung through the few approved North Korean tour operators.

There is speculation that Hamhung, with its high proportion of chemists and the site of a chemical-industrial complex built by the Japanese during World War II, might be the center for North Korea's methamphetamine production.

== Economy ==
Hamhung is much more economically diverse than most cities in North Korea, as Hamhung has many unique industries. Hamhung's rural areas are used for farm land and food distribution through the community. These lands mainly consist of paddies, but other crops are grown in small portion as well. Hamhŭng is an important chemical industry center in the DPRK. It is an industrial city which serves as a major port for North Korean foreign trade. Production includes textiles (particularly vinalon), metalware, machinery, refined oil and processed food. 2·8 vinalon union enterprise is located here.

== Transportation ==
The city is a transportation hub, connecting various eastern ports and the northern interior area. Hamhung Station is on the Pyongra Line railway. The city is connected by air too, with Sondok Airport. The city is also served by the narrow gauge, commuter Soho Line linking West Hamhung to Hungnam, via the February 28 Vinylon factory.

The city has a large trolleybus network, which opened in 1973 with the Hoyang-Doksong line, with a depot located at the northern Doksong terminus. The second and third lines, a pair of intercity lines from Hamhung station to the Hungnam area, was opened on 27 July 1991. This line had two branches, one to Hungdok and one to Ryongsong with the depot in Hungdok, though the latter line was closed and dismantled sometime in the early 2000s. A set of overhead wires connects the two separate lines, though there is no regular movement on this line. The lines were served by 28 trolleybuses in 2013.

== Culture ==
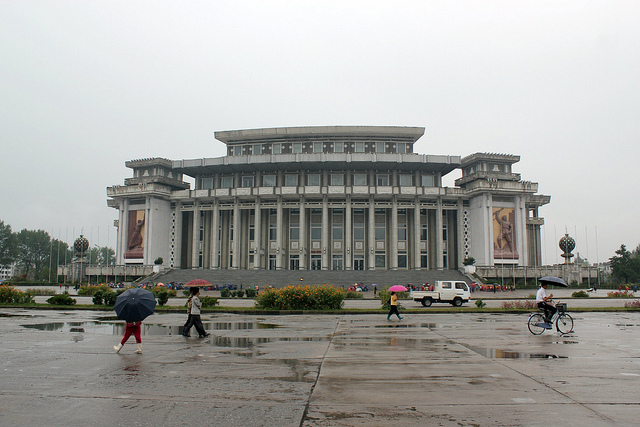
Hamhŭng Grand Theatre

Hamhŭng hosts the Hamhŭng Grand Theatre, the largest theatre in North Korea. A national museum is located in Hamhŭng. Hamhŭng is also well known for Naengmyeon, a traditional Korean style cold buckwheat noodle. Unlike Pyongyang cold noodle, Hamhŭng cold noodles tends to be more spicy, zesty, and have more garnish over the buckwheat noodle.

== Education ==
Hamhŭng is home to the Hamhung University of Education, Hamhŭng University of Pharmacy, Hamhung University of Chemical Industry and Hamhŭng University of Medicine. Professional colleges in Hamhŭng include the Hamhŭng College of Quality Control, the Hamhŭng Hydrographic and Power College, and the Hamhŭng College of Electronics and Automation. There is also a branch academy of science.

In 2018, the South Hamgyong Sci-Tech Library, the largest facility of its kind outside Pyongyang, opened in the city.

== Prisons ==
Two reeducation camps are located near Hamhung: Kyo-hwa-so No. 9 is in northeastern Hamhung, and Kyo-hwa-so No. 22 is in Yonggwang County north of Hamhung.

== People born in Hamhŭng ==
- Yi Seonggye (이성계; 1335–1408), the founder of the Chosŏn dynasty, Korea's last royal line
- Ahn Soo-kil (안수길; 1911–1977), South Korean writer
- Richard E. Kim (1932–2009), Korean American writer
- Samuel S. Kim (1935–2026), Korean-born American writer
- Rimhak Ree (이임학; 1922–2005), Korean Canadian mathematician
- Yoon Kwang-cho (윤광조; born 1946), South Korean ceramic artist
- Yang Hyong-sop (1925–2022), President of the Supreme People's Assembly from 1984 to 1998

== Twin towns – sister cities ==
Hamhung is twinned with:

- Shanghai, People's Republic of China - since 1982

== See also ==
- List of cities in North Korea
- Geography of North Korea
- List of provinces of Balhae
