= Tongdaewon-guyok =

Coordinates: 39.014882°N 125.781441°E

Tongdaewŏn-guyŏk
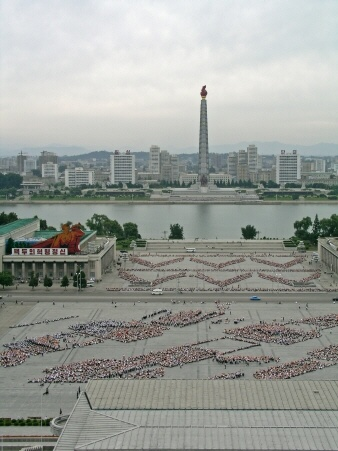
- Juche Tower seen from Kim Il-sung Square

- Interactive map of Tongdaewŏn-guyŏk
- Location within North Korea Location within Asia
- Country: North Korea

Population (2008)
  - Total: 143,561

- Tongdaewon-guyok
- Hangul: 동대원구역
- Hanja: 東大院區域
- Revised Romanization: Dongdaewon-guyeok
- McCune–Reischauer: Tongdaewŏn-guyŏk

Tongdaewŏn-guyŏk or Tongdaewon District is one of the 19 guyok which constitute the city of Pyongyang, North Korea. It sits on the eastern bank of the Taedong River. It is north of Sŏn'gyo-guyŏk (Songyo District), south of Taedonggang-guyŏk (Taedonggang District) and west of Sadong-guyŏk (Sadong District) and Ryŏkp'o-guyŏk (Ryokpho District). It was established in October 1960.

== Administrative divisions ==
Tongdaewŏn-guyŏk is divided into 18 tong (neighbourhoods):

- Ryul-dong 률동(栗洞)
- Taesin-dong 대신동(大新洞)
- Munsin 1-dong 문신 1동 (紋新 1洞)
- Munsin 2-dong 문신 2동 (紋新 2洞)
- Tongdaewŏn 1-dong 동대원 1동 (東大院 1洞)
- Tongdaewŏn 2-dong 동대원 2동 (東大院 2洞)
- Sinhŭng 1-dong 신흥 1동 (新興 1洞)
- Sinhŭng 2-dong 신흥 2동 (新興 2洞)
- Sinhŭng 3-dong 신흥 3동 (新興 3洞)
- Silli-dong 신리동 (新里洞)
- Tongsin 1-dong 동신 1동 (東新 1洞)
- Tongsin 2-dong 동신 2동 (東新 2洞)
- Tongsin 3-dong 동신 3동 (東新 3洞)
- Raengch'ŏn 1-dong 랭천 1동 (冷泉 1洞)
- Raengch'ŏn 2-dong 랭천 2동 (冷泉 2洞)
- Saesallim-dong 새살림동
- Samma 1-dong 삼마 1동 (三馬 1洞)
- Samma 2-dong 삼마 2동 (三馬 2洞)

== See also ==
- East Pyongyang Stadium:stadium located in the district
- Pyongyang University of Fine Arts: art school located in the district
- Kim Hyong Jik University of Education: teacher school located in the district
