= Kim Chol Ju University of Education =

University in North Korea

- Hangul: 김철주사범대학
- Hanja: 金鐵株師範大學
- RR: Gim Cheolju sabeom daehak
- MR: Kim Ch'ŏlchu sabŏm taehak

The Kim Chol Ju University of Education is a university in Sŏn'gyo-guyŏk, Pyongyang, North Korea.

It is named after Kim Chol Ju, a younger brother of Kim Il Sung.

== History ==
Emblem of Pyongyang University of Education No. 1. While the school has officially been renamed, this historic name and branding remain actively used domestically.

The university was established on October 1, 1946 (80 years ago) as the Pyongyang Teacher Training College (평양교원대학). It changed its name to the Pyongyang University of Education No. 1 (평양제1사범대학) in September 1972 (54 years ago). It was renamed the Pyongyang University of Education in April 1989. In October 1990 (36 years ago), the university was renamed to current name.

== Faculty ==
- Dean of Faculty Ho Nam Chol
- Professor Kim Hyun-sik (defector)
