= Korean People's Navy =

Maritime warfare branch of North Korea's military

Korean People's Army Navy
- 조선인민군 해군
- Patch of the Korean People's Army Navy
- Founded: 5 June 1946; 80 years ago
- Country: North Korea
- Allegiance: Workers' Party of Korea
- Type: Navy
- Size: 60,000 personnel
- Part of: Korean People's Army
- March: Quick – "조국의 바다 지켜 영생 하리라" (English: We Will Forever Protect The Sea Of Our Fatherland)
- Fleet: 2 destroyers; 71 submarines; 500+ landing craft; 3 frigates; 8 corvettes; 30 mine countermeasure vessels; 30 missile boats; 114+ torpedo boats; 187+ patrol boats
- Engagements: Korean War; Battle of Chumonchin Chan; Battle of Haeju; Pueblo incident; Gangneung Infiltration; 1998 Sokcho submarine incident; Battle of Yosu; First Battle of Yeonpyeong; Battle of Amami-Ōshima; Second Battle of Yeonpyeong; Battle of Daecheong; ROKS Cheonan sinking

Commanders
- Commander: Admiral Pak Kwang-sop

Insignia
- Flag: Front: Back:

- Ensign

- Guards Ensign

- Jack

Korean name
- Hangul: 조선인민군 해군
- Hanja: 朝鮮人民軍海軍
- RR: Joseon inmingun haegun
- MR: Chosŏn inmin'gun haegun

The Korean People's Army Navy (KPAN; Korean: 조선인민군 해군; MR: chosŏninmin'gun haegun) is the naval component of the Korean People's Army, the North Korean armed forces.

There are some 780 vessels including 70 midget submarines (including the Yono-class submarine and Sang-O-class submarine), 20 Romeo-class submarines, and about 140 air cushioned landing craft.

The North Korean navy is considered a brown-water (or riverine) navy with limited green water capabilities and operates mainly within the 50 kilometer exclusion zone. The fleet consists of east and west coast squadrons, which cannot support each other in the event of war with an adversary such as South Korea. The limited range of its vessels means that, even in peacetime, it is quite challenging for a ship on one coast to visit the other coast. So far North Korea operates only four confirmed green water vessels with plans of building at least two more. In theory, the Nampo-class corvettes may also be capable of green water operations. Perhaps the lack of replenishment oilers is the main factor, which by far prevents North Korea from deploying a decent sized green water navy.

== History ==
Flag of the KPN from 2012 to 2023.

The KPN was established on 5 June 1946.

=== 2013 submarine chaser sinking ===
On 13 October 2013, submarine chaser number 233 departed on a regular patrol, but failed to return on time. The boat was later discovered to be sunk, and the entire crew had died, who were named as martyrs. A seaside grave was constructed for these sailors, which Kim Jong Un visited, in a move described by the New York Times as bolstering his image of caring for the soldiers. Families of the victims were given portraits of their children and a collage of the grave.

=== Reported 2016 submarine sinking ===
On 11 March 2016, CNN and the U.S. Naval Institute News reported that unnamed US officials believed a North Korean submarine had been lost in the Sea of Japan. According to reports, the U.S. military had been observing the submarine when it "stopped" before the North Korean navy was observed by American spy satellites, aircraft and ships to be searching the area.

== Organization ==
According to the Defense Intelligence Agency, the 146,000-man Korean Peoples' Army Navy (KPAN) is primarily a coastal navy. The KPAN is organized into two fleets: the East Coast Fleet, with eight operational commands, and the West Coast Fleet, with five operational commands. The East Coast Fleet is headquartered at Toejo Dong, with major bases at Najin and Wonsan.

The West Coast Fleet is headquartered at Nampo, with major bases at Pipagot and Sagon Ni. Numerous smaller naval bases are located along both coasts. The fleets do not exchange vessels because geographical limitations make mutual support almost impossible. The KPAN does not have a marine corps or naval aviation capabilities. Amphibious operations are conducted by SOF units in addition to naval personnel.

According to South Korea's National Intelligence Service (in 1999):

The DPRK Navy is divided into East Sea (10 squadrons) and West Sea fleets (6 squadrons) with a total manpower of 148,000.

North Korea's fleet consist of approximately 630 combat vessels (Patrol craft, guided missile boats, torpedo boats, fire support craft, destroyers, frigates, corvettes, and three cruisers), 100 submarines, and 340 support craft (landing craft, hovercraft). As with the ground forces, 60% of the vessels are stationed near the demarcation line.

North Korea has constructed and is operating up to 130 hovercraft, each one capable of transporting a special forces platoon and operating freely in difficult terrain such as tidal flats, and able to be used for multiple landings by special forces troops at the onset of any war.

The Times puts the total in 2009 at "420 warships and 60 submarines."

The annual report of North Korea's military capabilities by the U.S. Department of Defense, released in early 2014, identified the North Korean Navy's strength at 60,000 personnel, 70 submarines, 420 gun boats, 260 amphibious landing craft, 30 mine warfare vessels, and 30 support ships.

== Inventory ==
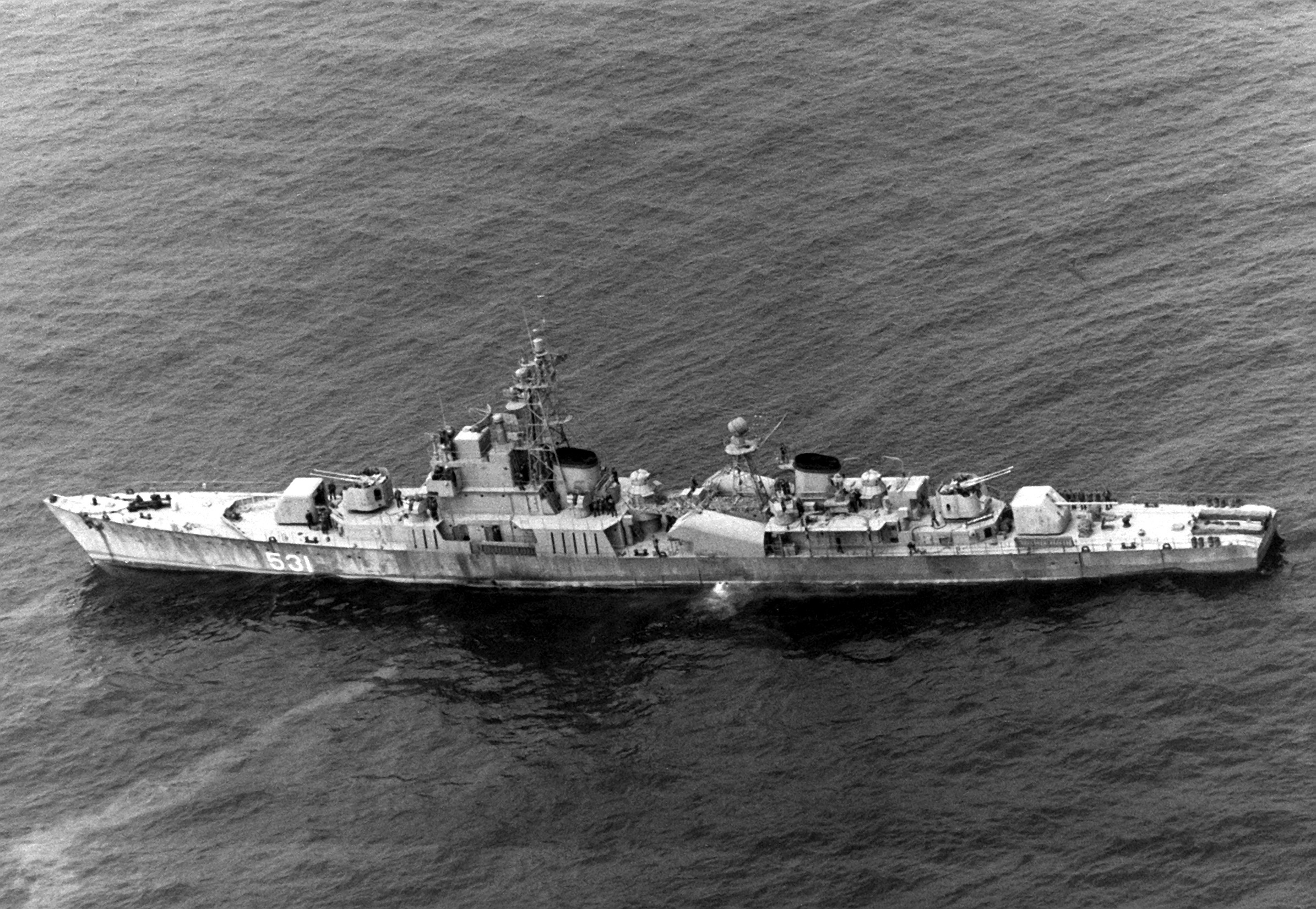
A 1993 aerial port side view of a North Korean Navy Najin class frigate underway

Most KPAN vessels are small patrol-size craft unable to operate over 50 nautical miles (NM) from the coast but capable of policing the DPRK's territorial waters. The navy's numerous amphibious craft and midget submarines are intended to clandestinely insert SOF units into the ROK. The DPRK also maintains coastal defense artillery and missile sites. Coastal defense artillery includes 122 mm, 130 mm, and 152 mm systems. Land-based coastal defense missiles include the KS-1 Komet, Silkworm (HY-1 and HY-2) .

The KPAN's most capable weapons systems are their approximately 43 guided-missile patrol boats equipped with the P-15 Termit antiship missile (or its Chinese version, the Silkworm (SY-1)). Though their small size limits operations to coastal waters and calm seas, they have a capability to quickly respond to Combined Forces Command (CFC) shipping approaching the coast. The KPAN has 12 Osa-class missile boat, 10 DPRK versions of the Osa-1 called the Soju, and 19 other fast-attack missile craft; the Osa and Osa-1 are all equipped with four Silkworm launchers. The missiles have a maximum range of 25 Nm and carry radar or infrared homing seekers.

The largest part of the KPAN consists of small combatants, including torpedo boats, patrol boats, patrol craft, fast attack craft, and small amphibious landing craft. Of the approximately 200 torpedo boats, nearly half are DPRK-built. Most are equipped with 25 mm to 37 mm guns. The DPRK built at least 62 Chaho fire-support patrol units. This unique vessel has a multiple rocket launcher in the center of its deck to provide fire support to ground troops or attack surface ships.

The DPRK's attack submarine inventory is estimated to include four former Soviet Whiskey-class submarine, 22 Chinese Romeo-class submarines, and DPRK-built Romeo-class submarines. The Whiskeys, acquired in the 1960s, can carry 12 torpedoes or 24 mines. Shortly after delivering four Romeos in the early 1970s, China helped the DPRK start its own Romeo construction program. The Romeos are well equipped, have an improved sonar, and can carry 14 torpedoes or 28 mines.

To date, the DPRK has indigenously produced over 200 personnel landing craft. This includes approximately 100 Nampo personnel landing craft based on a former Soviet P-6 torpedo boat hull. The Nampo has a maximum speed of 40 knots (74 km/h) and a radius of 335 nmi (620 km) at 28 knots (52 km/h). The Nampos provide a limited amphibious capability, each carrying up to 30 troops with a basic combat load. Amphibious assaults against CFC probably would be small, clandestine landings involving two to six Nampo craft; Chaho or other naval craft could provide fire support. Other amphibious craft include 8 Hantae medium landing ships, which can carry 3 to 4 light tanks, and approximately 125 Kongbang amphibious hovercraft.

The DPRK holds mine warfare capability. There are numerous small surface ships that are capable of delivering mines within both the navy and civilian sectors. Mines defend against amphibious assaults, defend strategic ports, and provide seaward flank protection for land forces. Defensive mine fields are monitored by coastal observation teams and radar, and are supported by artillery and missile batteries. These make close approach and mine clearing operations extremely hazardous. DPRK has a large inventory of older technology mines and significant historical experience with their effectiveness.

The latest bi-annual report of North Korea's military capabilities by the ROK's Ministry of National Defense, released in 2018, KPN inventory is estimated at 430 combat ships, 250 landing crafts, 20 mine layers, 40 support ships, 70 submarines.

== Modernization ==
For years, the Korean People's Army Naval Force stagnated with a number of ships becoming old and weapons turning obsolete, this peaked with an accident during drills, when the Chosun Ilbo reported that in mid-October 2013, one of the DPRK's Hainan-class submarine chasers and one of its smaller patrol boats sank during maneuvers in the Sea of Japan with an unknown loss of life.

After 2013 surfaced on western analysis, a number of upgrades and new classes in service with the Navy appeared: most of this modernization's program is left to speculation and analysis of satellite images, due to the absence of details released by North Korea.

South Korea reported that North Korea has built a new high-speed, wave piercing craft to deploy troops as part of efforts to enhance infiltration capabilities by sea. Called a Very Slender Vessel (VSV), it is cylindrical with a small cross section to pierce through waves at high speed. It is 10–15 m (33–49 ft) long and can carry a small number of special forces at over 100 km/h (62 mph; 54 kn), compared to air-cushion vehicles than can travel at 96 km/h (60 mph; 52 kn). VSVs are considered one of the most threatening craft in the Korean People's Army Naval Force for their commando infiltration capabilities onto border islands.

North Korea has built two helicopter frigates to enhance its anti-submarine warfare capabilities. Construction began in 2006-07 and launched in 2011–12, but it is unknown if they have been commissioned and are in service. The frigates are estimated to be 76 m (249 ft) long and 11 m (36 ft) wide, with a 29 m × 11 m (95 ft × 36 ft) flight deck and a displacement of 1,300 tonnes (1,300 long tons; 1,400 short tons). Armament is believed to include 4 RBU 1200 ASW rocket launchers, a 30 mm CIWS, and possibly the C-802 missile. Its main weapon is either a Mil Mi-4 or Mil Mi-14 helicopter.

In June 2014, propaganda pictures from the North Korean state TV briefly showed one of the newly built patrol SES vessels, firing a Kh-35 anti-ship cruise missile. Initially believed to have been exported to North Korea from Myanmar, the missiles appear to have been built indigenously, some of which were then exported to Myanmar. The missile gives the KPN the potential to considerably improve its anti-surface missiles. In addition to the missiles, the SES vessels show a reversed-engined gun of 76 mm (3 in). Kh-35 missiles were also installed during 2014 on one of the two old Najin-class frigates (replacing the previous obsolete KN-01 missiles): the ship also received upgrades in gunnery.

In autumn 2014, satellite images identified a newly built submarine of a new class: with a length of 67 metres, it's the largest-ever submarine built by North Korea. It is believed to be related to older Yugoslavian projects, and if mass-built could potentially replace the aging fleet of Romeo submarines.

In spring 2015, the Sinpo-class submarine designated 8.24 Yongung was observed at sea during trials, paired with a test of the Pukguksong-1 (KN-11) missile. On 2 October 2019 it conducted a launch of a Pukguksong-3 SLBM. On 19 October 2021 it conduct a launch of a Hwasong-11S SLBM. On 13 March 2023, it launched two SLCMs.

Korean People's Navy launched a Hwasal-2 land attack cruise missile from Amnok-class guided missile corvette on 21 August 2023.

A launching ceremony was conducted at Sinpo south shipyard for induction of Hero Kim Kun Ok SSB on 6 September 2023.

North Korea is constructing guided missile frigates with dozens of VLS cells at both west and east coast, Chongjin and Nampo Shipyard with estimated displacement of 4000 tons according to South Korean military in December 2024 and cavity with enough space to contain over 50 missiles or less depending on type according to researcher Jeffrey Lewis. Frigate at Nampo was unveiled in December 2024 and in Chongjin in February 2025. Estimated weight between 4000 and 5000 tons. Length of frigate is estimated at 140 meters according Center for Strategic and International Studies. 38 North estimates length of frigate at 144 meters. CSIS assessment on April 25 that frigate at Nampo may be ready in summer of 2025. The destroyer Choe Hyon was launched from Nampo shipyard on April 25. The second ship of such class, named Kang Kon, was launched on 12 June, after a previous unsuccessful attempt on 21 May, which led to a full investigation by North Korean authorities.

Construction of a nuclear powered ballistic missile submarine was announced and shown on March 8, 2025, with an estimated displacement of between 5,000 and 8,000 tons and carrying about 10 missiles. The MV Ursa Major, a Russian heavy-lift ship sunk in 2024 was reportedly carrying two VM-4SG nuclear reactor housings intended for North Korea.

In 2026, North Korea revealed its plan to build a 10,000-ton cruiser. In September 2026 it was reported based on analysis of satellite imagery that North Korea was constructing new warships in its both eastern and western coasts.

== Structure ==
=== Bases ===
The KPN has 20 bases split between the two coasts (Sea of Japan and Yellow Sea) with major and minor bases:

==== West Sea Fleet ====
The western fleet has approximately 300 watercraft (administrative, operational and logistic support), berthing facility for Yellow Sea Fleet; home to shipyard and sub base

- Ch'o-do: small support base and home to Sqron 9 (Fast Attack Craft)
- Haeju: major naval base and ship repair facility close to Demarcation Line
- Kwangyang-ni
- Pip'a-got: limited operational and logistical support to patrol craft; also home to some subs
- Sagot (Sagon-ni): home to Sqron 8
- Sunwi-do
- Tasa-ri: small naval base
- Yomju (Yomju-gun)
- Yongwi-do

==== East Sea Fleet ====
The eastern fleet has approximately 470 ships and small craft.

- Ch'aho (Ch'aho-nodongjagu) - one of two sub bases in North Korea
- Ch'angjon: home base for smaller patrol boats
- Mayangdo: operation and logistical support for submarines, antisubmarine craft, and patrol craft; one of 2 sub bases in North Korea
- Mugyepo: base for patrol boats, landing crafts and frigate
- Puam Dong: base for patrol boats, landing craft
- Puam-ni: small base for landing craft and patrol boats
- Rason (Rajin): major naval operating and training centre
- Songjon-Pando: support base for patrol and missile boats; part of the larger Wonsan naval/maritime complex
- T'oejo-dong: base for patrol boats and 1 frigate
- Tongchon County: Tongchon Naval Base, a naval base under construction since June 2026.
- Wonsan (Munch'on): large maritime complex and HQ for the eastern fleet (in the vicinity of Tapchon and Sokjon bays)

Some ships are domestically built at Wonsan and Nampho shipyards. Southern bases on each coasts are used to organize infiltrations into South Korea and Japan.

== Weapons ==
- MSI Yukto I/II countermeasures
- (North Korea) manned naval CIWS system of 14.5 mm (1 in) (gatling)
- (Italy) (North Korea) Oto Melara 76 mm (unlicensed copy)
- (North Korea) unmanned naval CIWS system of 30 mm (1 in) (gatling). Similar to Soviet dual 30 mm (1 in) AK-230.
- (North Korea) Pukguksong-1, Pukguksong-3, Pukguksong-4, Pukguksong-5 and Hwasong-11S
- (North Korea) Hwasal-2
- (Soviet Union) (North Korea) Kumsong-3 in coastal defense configuration.
- (Soviet Union) Kh-28
- (China) C-602 YJ62
- (China) C802 YJ82
- (China) (North Korea) Silkworm missiles, KN-1
- (Soviet Union) (North Korea) P-15 Termits, KN-1
- (Soviet Union) P-35s
- (Soviet Union) SA-16 9K310 Igla-1 SAM system
- (Soviet Union) 122 mm (5 in) gun M1931/37 (A-19) guns
- SM-4-1
- (North Korea) M-1992 130 mm self-propelled gun
- (Soviet Union) 152 mm (6 in) howitzer-gun M1937 (ML-20) ML towed artillery

== Ranks and uniforms ==
=== Commissioned officer ranks ===
The rank insignia of commissioned officers.

Rank group	General / flag officers						Senior officers				Junior officers
Korean People's Navy
Korean People's Navy	인민군원수; Inmingun-wonsu	차수; Chasu	대장; Daejang	상장; Sangjang	중장; Chungjang	소장; Sojang	대좌; Daechwa	상좌; Sangjwa	중좌; Chungjwa	소좌; Sojwa	대위; Taewi	상위; Sangwi	중위; Chungwi	소위; Sowi

=== Other ranks ===
The rank insignia of non-commissioned officers and enlisted personnel.

Rank group	Senior NCOs					Junior NCOs		Enlisted
Korean People's Navy
Korean People's Navy	특무상사; T'ŭkmu-sangsa	상사; Sangsa	중사; Chungsa	하사; Hasa	상급병사; Sanggŭp-pyŏngsa	중급병사; Chungŭp-pyŏngsa	하급병사; Hagŭp-pyŏngsa	전사; Chŏnsa

=== Uniforms ===
The naval officers wear black jackets and pants with blue shirt and dark tie underneath. Their peaked caps are from the Soviet era. In summer jackets are white in the full dress uniform. Junior ratings and seamen wear white shirts (in the summer) or navy blue shirts (in the winter) with black/white jackets and slacks (skirts for women) and wear sailor caps. All ranks wear shoulder and collar insignia while all officers, flag officers included, wear sleeve insignia as well in their service blue uniforms.

== Anniversary ==
At first, an ordinance issued by the Supreme People's Assembly on June 3, 1972, designated August 28 as the Navy Day, claiming that the first leader Kim Il Sung organized the Torpedo Unit on that date of 1949. In 1993 the North Korean authorities changed it to June 5, as its "Maritime Security Corps" were organized on June 5, 1946.

== Commanders ==
No.	Portrait	Name (born–died)	Term of office			Ref.
No.	Portrait	Name (born–died)	Took office	Left office	Time in office	Ref.
		Yu Chang-kwon	c. 1975	1982	6–7 years	
		Kim Il-chol (1933–2023)	1982	1997	14–15 years	
		Kim Yun-sim (1923–2021)	June 1997	December 2007	10 years	
		Jong Myong-do	December 2007	2012	4–5 years	
		Kim Myong-sik	April 2013	April 2015	2 years	
		Ri Yong-ju	April 2015	2017	5–6 years	
		Kim Myong-sik	2017	February 2021	3–4 years	
		Kim Song-gil	February 2021	2023	1–2 years	
		Kim Myong-sik	2023	May 2025	1–2 years	
		Park Kwang Seop	May 2025	Incumbent	1 year, 5 months	

== See also ==
- Northern Limit Line
- Korean Demilitarized Zone
- Defense industry of North Korea
- Republic of Korea Armed Forces
- Republic of Korea Navy
- Korean People's Army Ground Force
- Korean People's Army Air and Anti-Air Force
