= North Korean submarine Hero Kim Kun Ok =

North Korean nuclear missile submarine

History

North Korea
- Name: Hero Kim Kun Ok
- Namesake: Kim Kun Ok
- Builder: Sinpo South shipyard
- Launched: 6 September 2023
- Commissioned: 7 September 2023
- Status: in active service

General characteristics
- Class & type: Sinpo-C-class submarine
- Length: 86 m (282 ft 2 in)
- Armament: Submarine-launched ballistic missiles; Cruise missiles

- North Korean submarine Hero Kim Kun Ok
- Hangul: 김군옥영웅함
- Hanja: 金君玉英雄艦
- RR: Gim Gunok yeongungham
- MR: Kim Kunok yŏngungham

Hero Kim Kun Ok (Korean: 김군옥영웅함) or Tactical Nuclear Attack Submarine No. 841, is a Sinpo-C-class submarine operated by the Korean People's Navy. It is a modification of the Romeo-class submarine, of which 20 are under operation by North Korea. The "nuclear" in its designation refers to its projected armament; it is diesel-, not nuclear-powered.

The submarine was launched on 6 September 2023 as Hero Kim Kun Ok and christened and commissioned on the next day with both events attended by Kim Jong Un as chief guest, and she was promoted by North Korean media as the "first of its kind" designed for "core underwater offensive means".

== Background ==
In August 2016, the existence of a modern class of submarine, designated the Sinpo class was determined after the launch of a Pukguksong-1 (KN-11) ballistic missile into the Sea of Japan.

Subsequently, in 2019, satellite imagery of a modified Romeo-class submarine of about 3,000 tons displacement was shown to be under construction at Sinpo South shipyard. Analysis by 38 North indicates that it has been in the construction warehouse as early as 2014. Kim Jong Un visited the site of construction, deemed the Pongdae submarine factory in 2019, and declared that a "new era" for the Korean People's Navy was arriving within a span of "five to ten years". Prior to the formal ceremony, the NIS noted that Russia proposed a joint naval exercise with North Korea and China in late July 2023.

Image of Hero Kim Kun Ok at launch
- https://assets.korearisk.com/uploads/kcna-watch/kcna_kp_en/images/PIC0076032.jpg

Despite its designation by North Korea as a "Tactical Nuclear Attack Submarine", it is neither an attack submarine, designed for hunting hostile submarines, nor is it nuclear-powered. The design may even lack torpedo tubes altogether. Instead its designation refers to its projected armament, of perhaps up to 10 nuclear-capable ballistic missiles.

With 20 Romeo-class subs in the inventories of the North Korean navy, Kim described as a "rapid improvement of our national defense capabilities with nuclear deterrence as the core", with a long-term plan of modifying the rest of the Romeo subs.

== Launching ==
The naming and launching ceremony of the submarine occurred at Sinpo shipyard on 6 September 2023, subsequently announced two days later on North Korean state media. Independent journalists were not given access to cover the event. It coincided with the 75th anniversary of the establishment of North Korea on 9 September 1948. The ship was named after a naval leader Kim Kun Ok, who claimed to have sunk the American cruiser USS Baltimore in the Battle of Chumonchin Chan, despite the fact that Baltimore was never deployed to the Korean War and was in fact, decommissioned and mothballed in 1947. Non-North Korean records show that UN forces suffered zero casualties in the battle, while the North Koreans lost 3 torpedo boats.

== Armament ==
Israeli missile researcher, Tal Inbar, said to NK News that the newly upgraded submarine can carry a combination of submarine-launched ballistic missiles (SLBMs) and cruise missiles with nuclear warheads. James Martin Center associate Dave Schmerler observed from the state media photos that the submarine has four large and six small missile hatches, the large ones capable of launching medium SLBMs like the Pukguksong-3 capable of striking short-ranged targets in Japan and South Korea. It is unclear whether North Korea has developed the warheads required for such weapons. North Korea's possession and testing of such weapons is a violation of nine United Nations Security Council resolutions.

It is also presumed that the sub is capable of launching an unmanned underwater vehicle designated the "Haeil", unveiled in March 2023.

Analysis of the submarine indicates that its length has been increased by 10 meters (32 ft 10 in) (86 m, 282 ft 2 in total) compared to the original length and configuration of the original Romeo-class submarine but with an offset of a reduced bow, removal of the forward torpedo tubes, and a bulky sail that increases drag.

== Operational history ==
North Korean state media stated the submarine was intended to operate in the Sea of Japan.

As of July 2025, satellite imaging of the submarine indicates that it has not gone on deployment, remaining in the same canopy, with a piece of probable equipment beside it for the past five months. Should the conversion from the Type 003 sub be successful, its operational debut is estimated somewhere between the next 6-12 months.

In October 2026, Hero Kim Kun Ok successfully test launched two submarine launched cruise missiles, the first such test in three years. According to images released by the North Korean government, one missile was launched vertically while the other was fired at a 45 degree angle. Both were launched while submerged.

== Responses ==
In an interview by the Joint Chiefs of Staff of South Korea, one official raised question about the sub's capabilities, and that additional monitoring in coordination with the United States will continue in order to respond to provocations.

South Korean commentators stated that the sub "does not look to be operational", that Pyongyang were "exaggerating the submarine’s capabilities" which "could not be operated normally", and that the project was "squandering [North Korea's] scarce resources into its futile weapons development while disregarding living difficulties of its people".

The age of the Romeo-class design, first produced by the Soviet Union in 1957, raised questions as to the submarine's effectiveness if it were ever employed. Former US Government expert Vann Van Diepen described it as "noisy, slow, and having limited range." Joseph Dempsey, a researcher at the International Institute for Strategic Studies, described it as having "fundamental limitations and vulnerabilities."
