= Sinpo (disambiguation) =

Articles on Sinpo include:

- Sinpo, South Hamgyong, North Korea
- Sinpo, North Hamgyong, North Korea
- Sinpo Station (Pyongra Line), North Korea
- Sinpo Station (Incheon), South Korea
- Sinpo-class submarine
- SINPO code, acronym for signal, interference, noise, propagation, and overall
