= USS Baltimore (CA-68) =

Heavy cruiser of the United States Navy

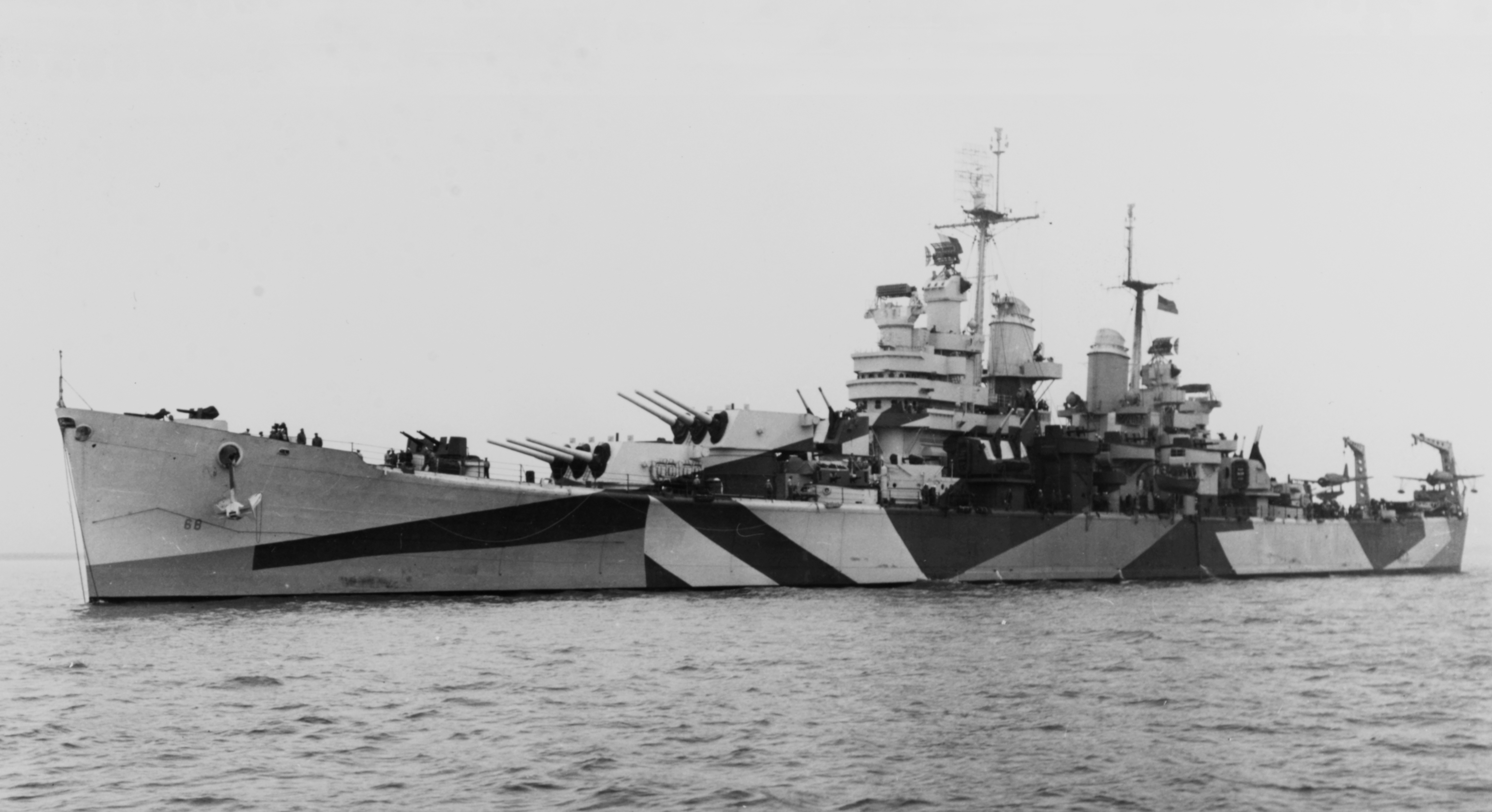
- USS Baltimore off the Mare Island Naval Shipyard on 18 October 1944

History

United States
- Name: Baltimore
- Namesake: City of Baltimore, Maryland
- Builder: Bethlehem Shipbuilding Corporation's Fore River Shipyard, Quincy, Massachusetts
- Laid down: 26 May 1941
- Launched: 28 July 1942
- Sponsored by: Mrs. Howard W. Jackson
- Commissioned: 15 April 1943
- Decommissioned: 8 July 1946
- Recommissioned: 28 November 1951
- Decommissioned: 31 May 1956
- Stricken: 15 February 1971
- Identification: Callsign: NAKY; Hull number: CA-68
- Fate: Sold 10 April 1972; Scrapped September 1972

General characteristics
- Class & type: Baltimore-class heavy cruiser
- Displacement: 14,472 long tons (14,704 t) (standard); 17,031 long tons (17,304 t) (max)
- Length: 673 ft 5 in (205.26 m) oa
- Beam: 70 ft 10 in (21.59 m)
- Draft: 20 ft 6 in (6.25 m) (mean); 26 ft 10 in (8.18 m) (max)
- Installed power: 4 × 615 psi Steam boilers; 120,000 shp (89,000 kW)
- Propulsion: 4 × General Electric geared turbines; 4 × screws
- Speed: 33 kn (38 mph; 61 km/h)
- Range: 10,000 nmi (19,000 km) at 15 kn (17 mph; 28 km/h)
- Complement: 1,142 officers and enlisted
- Armament: 3 × triple 8"(203mm)/55 caliber guns; 6 × dual 5"(127mm)/38 caliber anti-aircraft guns; 12 × quad 40 mm (1.6 in) Bofors anti-aircraft guns; 24 × single 20 mm (0.79 in) Oerlikon anti-aircraft cannons
- Armor: Belt: 4–6 in (100–150 mm); Deck: 2.5 in (64 mm); Barbettes: 6–6.3 in (150–160 mm); Turrets: 1.5–8 in (38–203 mm)
- Aircraft carried: 4 × floatplanes
- Aviation facilities: 2 × stern catapults

USS Baltimore (CA-68) was the lead ship of her class of heavy cruiser, the fifth ship of the United States Navy named after the city of Baltimore, Maryland.

== Design ==
Baltimore was 664 feet (202.4 m) long at the waterline and 673 ft 5 in (205.26 m) long overall. She had a beam of 70 ft 10 in (21.59 m) and a draft of 24 ft (7.3 m). She displaced 14,472 long tons (14,704 t) at standard displacement and 17,031 long tons (17,304 t) at full combat load. The ship had a crew of 1,142 officers and enlisted men.

== Construction and commissioning ==
Baltimore was laid down on 26 May 1941 at Bethlehem Steel's Fore River Shipyard in Quincy, Massachusetts. She was launched on 28 July 1942, sponsored by the wife of the mayor of Baltimore, Howard W. Jackson, and commissioned on 15 April 1943.

== Operational history ==
=== World War II ===
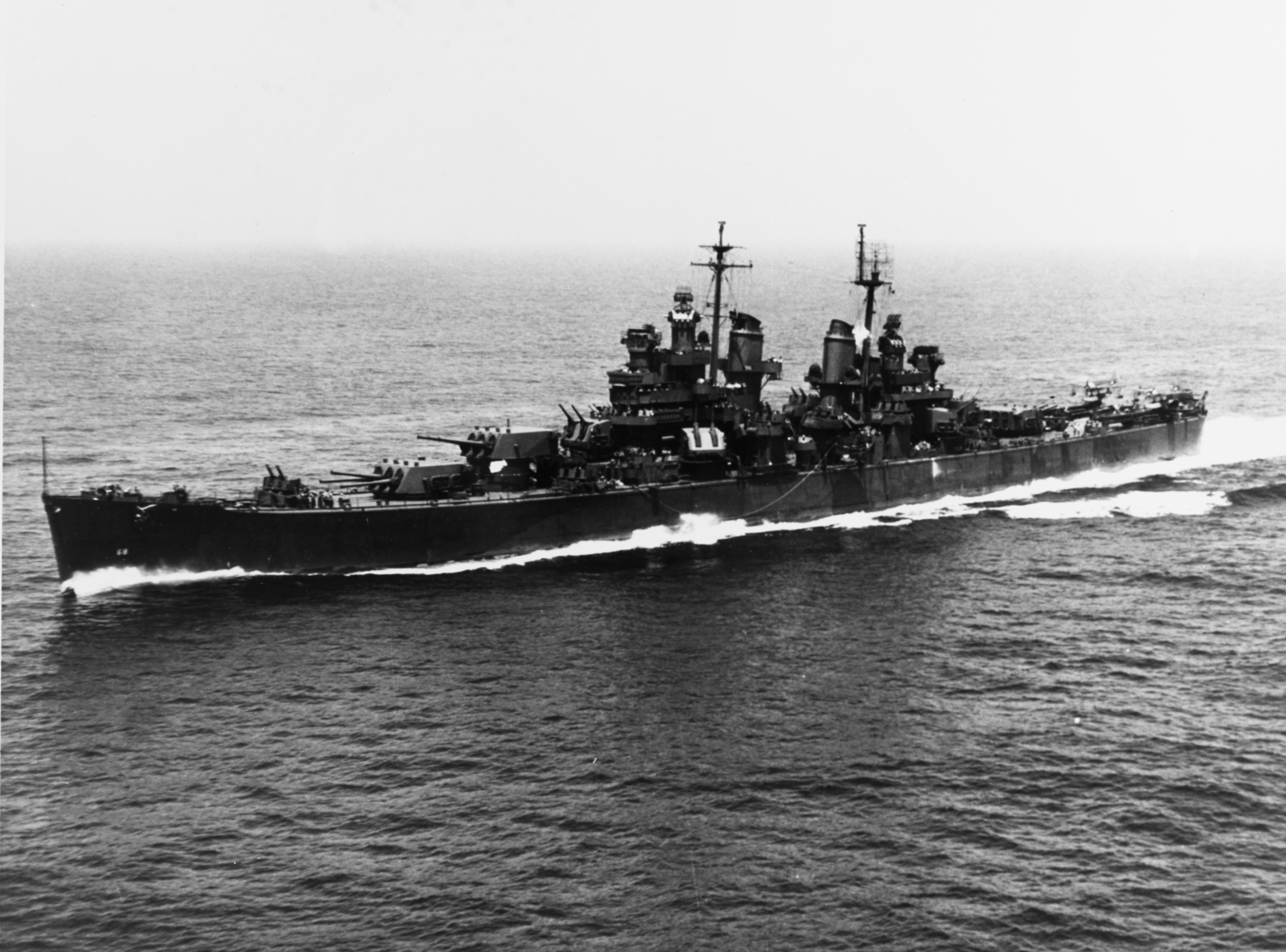
Baltimore off the coast of Massachusetts, June 1943

Following fitting-out, Baltimore departed for Hampton Roads, Virginia, on 17 June 1943, briefly visited the United States Naval Academy at Annapolis, Maryland, on 20 June, then conducted exercises off the Virginia Capes on 22 June. She went to Naval Station Norfolk at Norfolk, Virginia, for upkeep between 24 June and 1 July, when she departed for shakedown off Trinidad. Operating from Port of Spain, she conducted gunnery training before returning to Hampton Roads on 24 July. On 28 July, she departed for Boston, Massachusetts, to visit the Boston Navy Yard for post-shakedown availability, i.e., repairs to correct deficiencies found during shakedown, and to correct a leak in the main battery hydraulic piping. Returning to Norfolk in early September 1943 after the completion of the repairs, Baltimore and the destroyer USS Sigourney (DD-643) departed for the United States West Coast. They transited the Panama Canal on 25 September 1943 and arrived at the San Diego Naval Base in San Diego, California, on 4 October 1943, after which she trained off the U.S. West Coast from 9 to 13 October. Departing San Diego on 16 October, she called briefly at San Francisco, California, then arrived at Pearl Harbor, Territory of Hawaii, independently on 29 October 1943.

Between November 1943 and June 1944 Baltimore was a unit of the fire support and covering forces in the invasion of Butaritari, known to the Americans during World War II as "Makin Island" or "Makin Atoll" (20 November–4 December 1943); the invasion of Kwajalein Atoll (29 January – 8 February 1944); Operation Hailstone, a major raid on and the Truk Atoll (16–17 February 1944); and the seizure of Eniwetok Atoll (17 February – 2 March 1944). On 17 February 1944, Lieutenant (junior grade) Denver M. Baxter, USNR, flying one of Baltimore′s Vought OS2U Kingfisher floatplanes, covered by two Grumman F6F Hellcat fighters, rescued Lieutenant (junior grade) George M. Blair, USNR, of Fighting Squadron 9 (VF-9) less than 6,000 yards (5,500 m) from Japanese-held Dublon Island inside Truk Lagoon, where Blair had ditched his Hellcat.

Baltimore continued to provide fire support in the Marianas attacks (21–22 February), the Palau-Yap-Ulithi-Woleai raid (30 March – 1 April 1944), the invasion of Hollandia (21–24 April 1944); the Truk-Satawan-Ponape raid (29 April – 1 May 1944); air strikes against Marcus Island (19–20 May 1944) and Wake Island (23 May 1944); the invasion of Saipan (11–24 June 1944); and the Battle of the Philippine Sea (19–20 June 1944).

Returning to the United States in July 1944, Baltimore embarked President Franklin D. Roosevelt and his party and steamed to Pearl Harbor. After Roosevelt met with Admiral Chester Nimitz and General Douglas MacArthur, Baltimore transported him to the Territory of Alaska. where he disembarked on 3 August 1944. He would arrive at the Washington Ship Yards on 9 August.

Returning to the war zone in November 1944, Baltimore was assigned to the United States Third Fleet and participated in the attacks on Luzon (14–16 December 1944 and 6–7 January 1945); Taiwan (3–4, 9, 15, and 21 January 1945), the China coast (12 and 16 January 1945), and Okinawa (22 January 1945). On 26 January 1945 she joined the United States Fifth Fleet for her final operations of the war: Honshū attacks (16–17 February 1945), the invasion of Iwo Jima (19 February – 5 March 1945), and the Fifth Fleet raids in support of the invasion of Okinawa (18 March – 10 June 1945).

== Post-World War II ==
After World War II concluded in August 1945, Baltimore took part in Operation Magic Carpet, then was part of the naval occupation force in Japan from 29 November 1945 to 17 February 1946). Departing the Far East on 17 February 1946, she returned to the United States and was decommissioned and placed in reserve on 8 July 1946 at Bremerton, Washington.

Baltimore was recommissioned 28 November 1951 and assigned to the United States Atlantic Fleet. She deployed with the United States Sixth Fleet in the Mediterranean during the summers of 1952, 1953, and 1954. In June 1953 she represented the United States Navy in the British Fleet Review at Spithead. On 5 January 1955 she was transferred to the United States Pacific Fleet. She deployed with the United States Seventh Fleet in the Far East between February and August 1955.

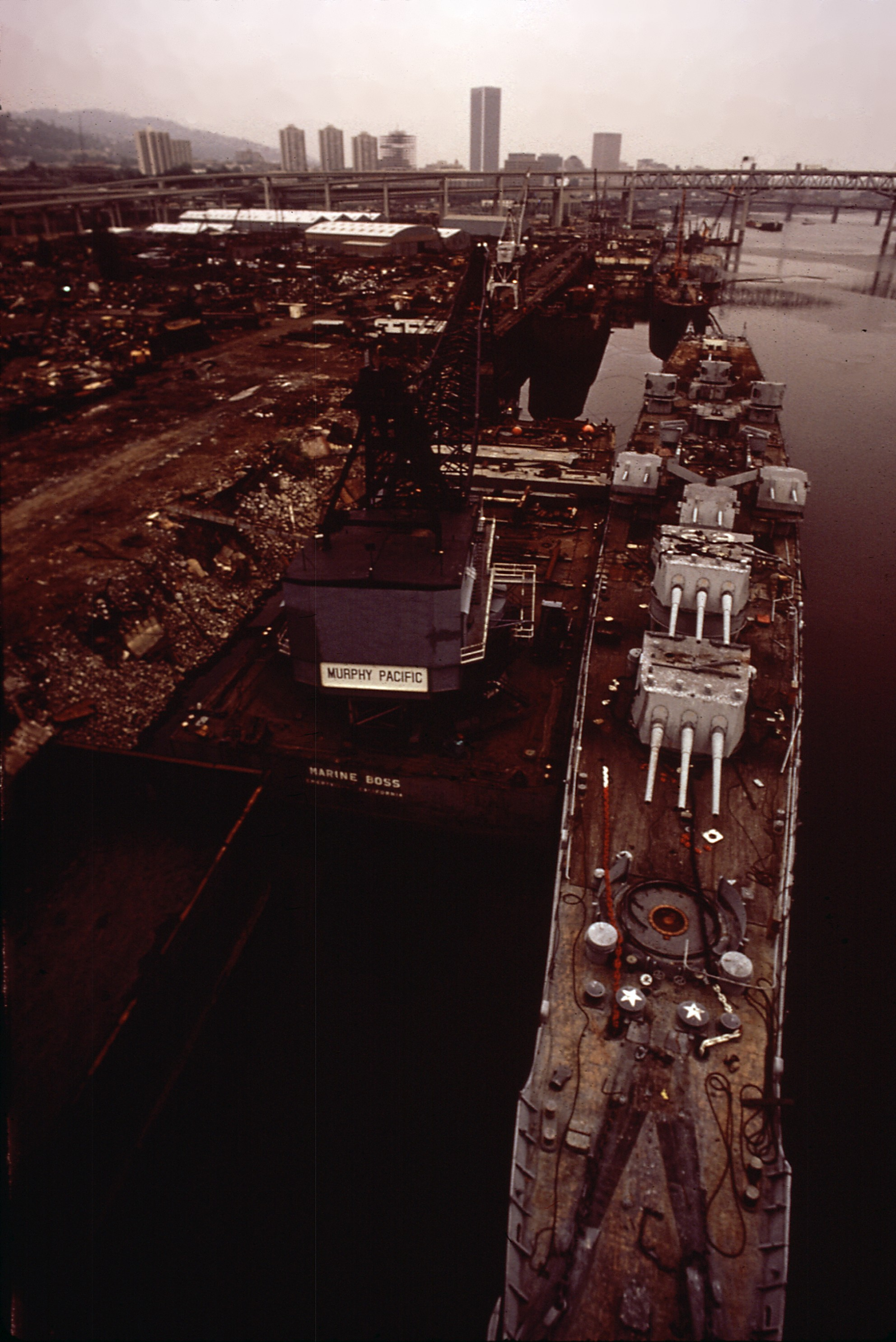
Baltimore being dismantled at Zidell shipbreaking yard in September 1972.

Baltimore commenced pre-inactivation overhaul on her return from the Far East and went out of commission in reserve at Bremerton on 31 May 1956 after just 6 3/4 years of active service. She was struck from the Navy List 15 February 1971, sold 10 April 1972 to Zidell Ship Dismantling Company Portland, Oregon, and scrapped in September 1972.

== Awards ==
- Asiatic-Pacific Campaign Medal with nine battle stars
- World War II Victory Medal
- Navy Occupation Service Medal with "EUROPE" and "ASIA" clasps
- National Defense Service Medal

== Alleged sinking by North Korea ==
The Victorious War Museum in Pyongyang, North Korea, has several exhibits that claim the Baltimore was sunk by motor torpedo boats belonging to the Korean People's Navy in the Korean War during the Battle of Chumonchin Chan on 2 July 1950. Exhibits include a poster and the "actual" boat which supposedly sank Baltimore. However, the ship was in the U.S. Navy's decommissioned reserve from 1946 to 1951 before being recommissioned and assigned to the U.S. Atlantic Fleet. Baltimore did not return to the Far East until 1955, when she was transferred to the U.S. Pacific Fleet two years after the end of the Korean War.

The actual battle involved the U.S. Navy light cruiser USS Juneau, the Royal Navy sloop HMS Black Swan and light cruiser HMS Jamaica. Together they destroyed several North Korean motor torpedo boats without loss or damage to themselves. Nonetheless, in 2023 North Korea named a North Korean People's Navy Sinpo-C class submarine Hero Kim Kun Ok after the North Korean naval leader who claimed to have sunk Baltimore on 2 July 1950.

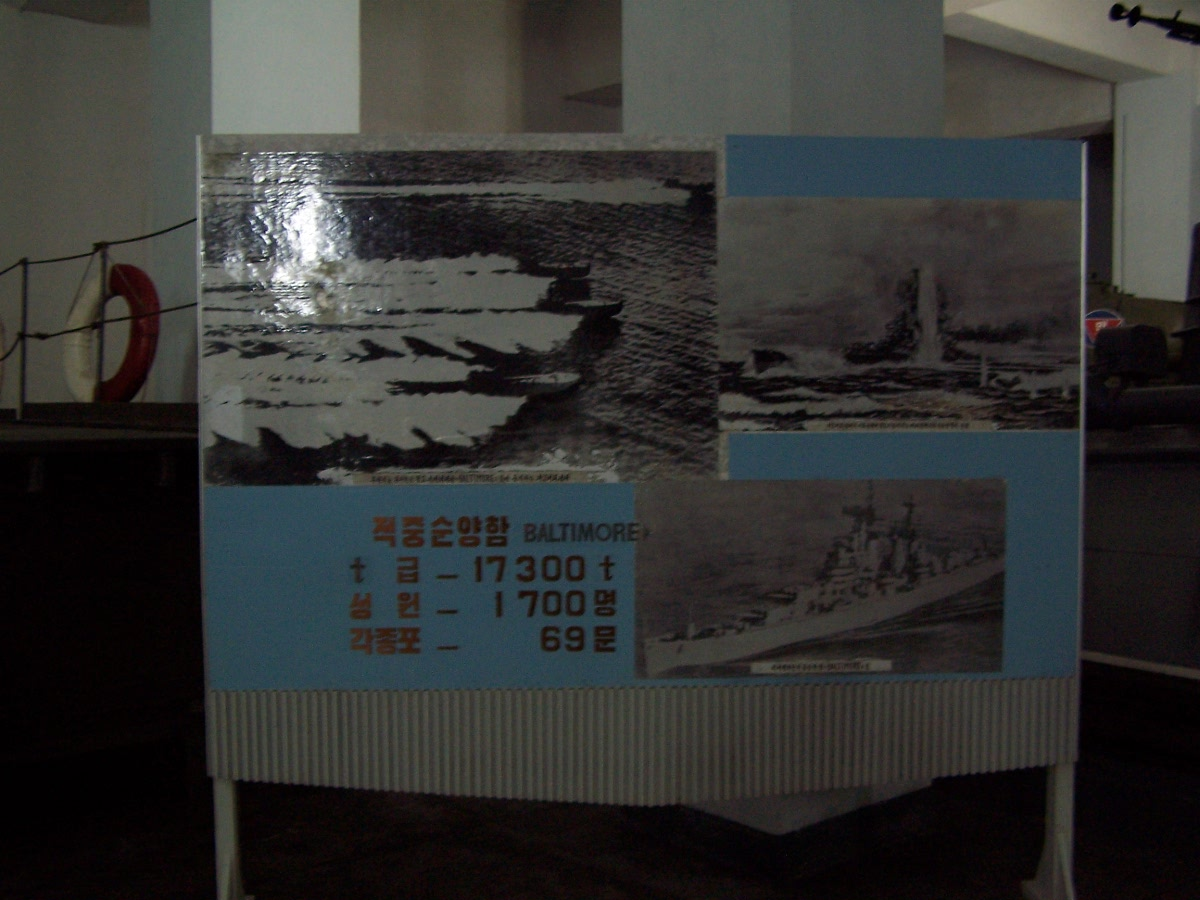
North Korean propaganda poster proclaiming the sinking of Baltimore.

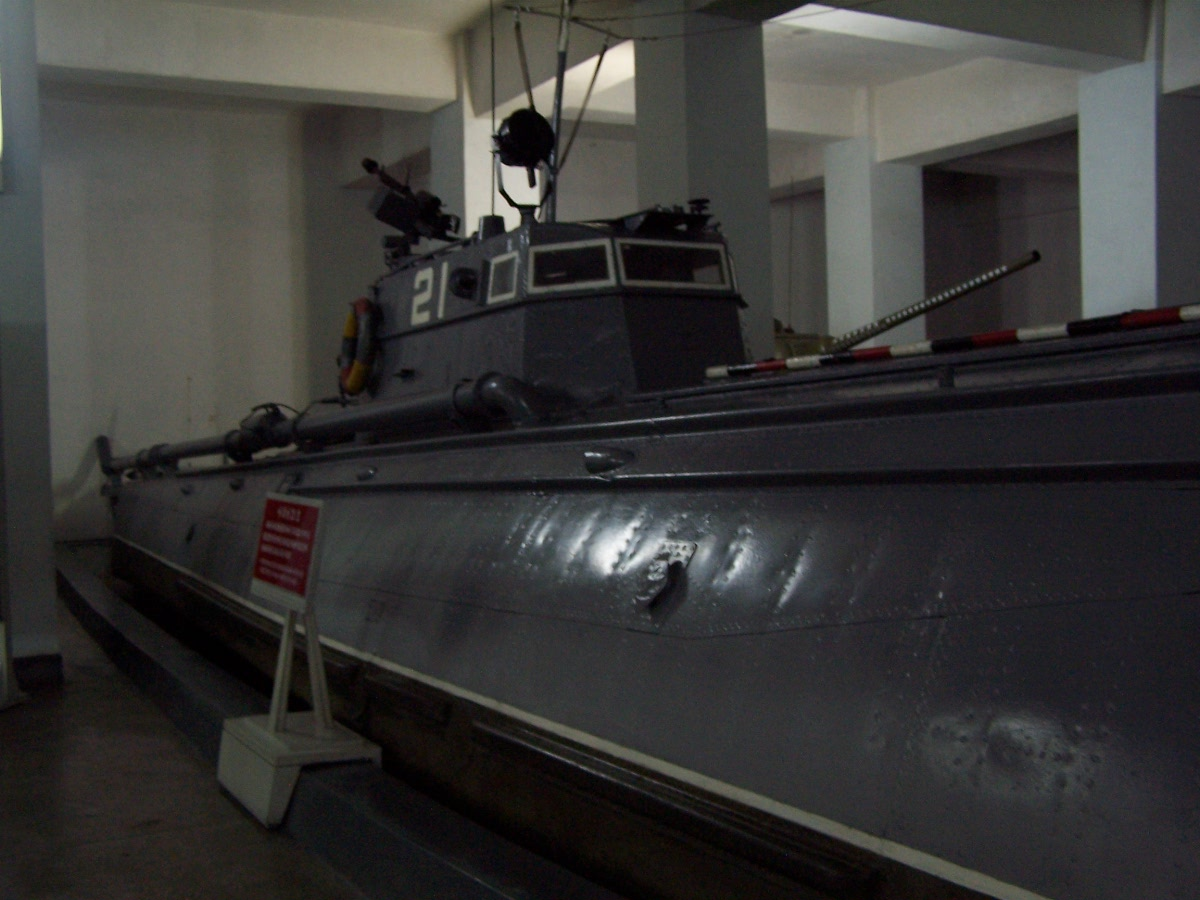
North Korean torpedo boat that supposedly sank Baltimore.
