= Kibong-dong hovercraft base =

Coordinates: 39.6147°N 124.6325°E

The Kibong-dong hovercraft base (기봉동) is a base of Korean People's Army Naval Force located in North Pyongan Province, North Korea.

== History ==
Kibong-dong was constructed in the 1980s.

== Hovercraft ==
Kibong-dong has sheds which could house approximately 52 hovercraft vessels. The hovercraft sheds were constructed between 2000 and 2003. Hovercraft were last observed in early October 2014 Google Earth imagery, since that date free to use imagery has shown little evidence of activity of any kind.
