= Pukguksong-4 =

- Type: Submarine-launched ballistic missile
- Place of origin: North Korea

Production history
- Designed: 2020
- Manufacturer: North Korea
- No. built: 4 prototypes

Specifications
- Length: About 10 m (33 ft)
- Width: About 2 m (6.6 ft)
- Warhead: Nuclear warhead MIRV-capable (unconfirmed)
- Propellant: solid fuel
- Operational range: 3,500–5,400 km (2,200–3,400 mi) (estimated)
- Launch platform: submersible barge, submarine (planned)

The Pukguksong-4 (Note: Also known as Pukguksong-4A (북극성-4A; lit. Polaris 4A), Pukguksong-4S (북극성-4ㅅ; lit. Polaris 4S), Pukguksong-4ㅅ (mixing Latin and Korean characters).) (Korean: 북극성-4; lit. Polaris 4) is a North Korean two-stage, solid-fueled submarine-launched ballistic missile (SLBM). First displayed on 10 October 2020 during a military parade, Pukguksong-4 is an evolution of Pukguksong-3 with a larger size and a longer range.

== Description ==
Images of the Pukguksong-4
- At the 10 October 2020 military parade

Pukguksong-4 is a two-stage, solid-fueled ballistic missile. As a further development from Pukguksong-3, it is significantly increased in size compared to the predecessor, with an estimated length and diameter of about 10 m (33 ft) and about 2 m (6.6 ft), respectively. Other sources claimed Pukguksong-4 to be shorter than Pukguksong-3. It is likely designed to be fitted with Sinpo-C class submarine, which was being built in 2020, capable of carrying 3–4 SLBMs.

As portions of the Pukguksong-4's engine appear to be filament-wound, the missile has a heavier payload, a better range and is lighter compared to the previous missiles. The maximum range of Pukguksong-4 is estimated from 3,500 km (2,200 mi) with a 1,300 kg (2,900 lb) payload to 5,400 km (3,400 mi) with a 650 kg (1,430 lb) payload. It is alleged to be MIRV-capable, but it remains unconfirmed. According to Daily NK, Pukguksong-4 is capable of carrying four warheads, but it can be increased to eight.

The missile is also claimed to be a silo-based missile and missing the second stage or stage separation mechanism.

Pukguksong-4 appears to have two versions, with different lengths for different launch tubes. Daily NK's sources state that the two versions of Pukguksong-4 are: a shorter version, whose diameter is larger than Pukguksong-3, and a slightly longer version.

== History ==
Pukguksong-4 made its public debut in a military parade commemorating the 75th anniversary of the founding of the Workers' Party of Korea on 10 October 2020. According to German expert Norbert Brügge, it was seen with a Korean People's Army Ground Force escort. Four Pukguksong-4 missiles were seen, and these missiles were placed on trucks. North Korea introduced Pukguksong-4 missiles as "underwater strategic ballistic missiles". These missiles appear to have different lengths.

According to South Korean Chief of Naval Operations Boo Suk-jong, the name written in these missiles is Pukguksong-4S, not Pukguksong-4A, and the letter "ㅅ" (S) may stand for "sujung" (수중; lit. underwater) or "susang" (수상; lit. water surface).

A further development of Pukguksong-4, called Pukguksong-5, was displayed on 14 January 2021 during a military parade. Pukguksong-5, believed to be similar to Pukguksong-4, appears to be larger than its predecessor.

There have been no known test for Pukguksong-4 so far. However, an alleged flight test occurred on 19 October 2021. Initially, the missile used for the test-fire was supposed to be some types of SLBMs, including Pukguksong-4. Later, the missile used in the 19 October 2021 launch was judged to be Hwasong-11S, an underwater-launched variant of Hwasong-11A (KN-23).

== See also ==
- Pukguksong-3 – (North Korea)
- K-4 – (India)
- M4 – (France)
- UGM-27 Polaris – (United States)
