= Pukguksong-5 =

- Type: Submarine-launched ballistic missile
- Place of origin: North Korea

Production history
- Designed: 2021
- Manufacturer: North Korea
- No. built: 5 prototypes

Specifications
- Length: About 10.5–11.6 m (34–38 ft)
- Width: About 1.8–2.1 m (5.9–6.9 ft)
- Warhead: Nuclear warhead MIRV-capable (unconfirmed)
- Propellant: solid fuel
- Operational range: About 3,000–5,000 km (1,900–3,100 mi) (estimated)
- Launch platform: submersible barge, submarine (planned)

The Pukguksong-5 (Note: Also known as Pukguksong-5S (북극성-5ㅅ; lit. Polaris 5S), Pukguksong-5ㅅ (mixing Latin and Korean characters) and Pukkuksong-5.) (Korean: 북극성-5; lit. Polaris 5) is a North Korean two-stage, solid-fueled submarine-launched ballistic missile (SLBM). First unveiled in January 2021 during a military parade, Pukguksong-5 is an evolution of Pukguksong-3 with a longer range and a larger size. The missile may also be capable of carrying a heavier payload or multiple warheads. North Korea has claimed Pukguksong-5 as "the world's most powerful weapon".

== Description ==
Images of the Pukguksong-5
- At the 14 January 2021 military parade

Pukguksong-5 is a two-stage, solid-fueled ballistic missile. It is significantly increased in size compared to the Pukguksong-4, with estimated length and diameter of 10.5–11.6 m (34–38 ft) and 1.8–2.1 m (5 ft 11 in – 6 ft 11 in) respectively. Compared with Pukguksong-3 and Pukguksong-4, Pukguksong-5 have a pointed, elongated nose cone.

German expert Norbert Brügge claimed the Pukguksong-5 to be a silo-based missile.

Pukguksong-5 is alleged to have greater range and heavier payload. The operational range of Pukguksong-5 is assumed to be from about 3,000 km (1,900 mi) to 4,000–5,000 km (2,500–3,100 mi), allowing North Korea submarines to threaten Guam while operating in the Sea of Japan, not far from the North Korean coast. The range is claimed to be a result of the backwardness in design, manufacturing technology and solid propellants. It is possible that Pukguksong-5 is capable of carrying multiple warheads.

The Pukguksong-5's first stage is possibly identical to Pukguksong-3 and Pukguksong-4.

== History ==
In November 2019 and October 2020, Daily NK's sources reported that North Korea planned to develop Pukguksong-5, intending to be fitted to a nuclear-powered submarine and launched in 2022.

Pukguksong-5 made its public debut in a military parade on 14 January 2021. Four Pukguksong-5 missiles were placed on 6-axle wheeled semi-trailers. At the time of debut, North Korea claimed Pukguksong-5 to be "the world's most powerful weapon". The appearance of yet another untested missile likely indicates North Korea is still in the process of finalizing on a specific SLBM design. These missiles were assessed to be non-operational mock-ups.

North Korea displayed Pukguksong-5 along with Pukguksong-1 and then-unnamed Hwasong-11S during "Self-Defence 2021" military exhibition, held in October 2021.

According to Kim Dong-yup, a professor at the University of North Korean Studies, a solid-fueled engine, which was tested in December 2022 and produced 140 tons of thrust, could be the engine of Pukguksong-5.

It is possible that Pukguksong-5 remains just a paper project.

There have been no known test for Pukguksong-5 so far. However, an alleged flight test occurred on 19 October 2021. Initially, the missile used for the test-fire was supposed to be some types of SLBMs, including Pukguksong-5. Later, the missile used in the 19 October 2021 launch was judged to be Hwasong-11S, an underwater-launched variant of Hwasong-11A (KN-23).

== See also ==
- Pukguksong-4 – (North Korea)
- M45 – (France) – (France)
- R-29R – (Soviet Union)
- UGM-96 Trident I – (United States)
- JL-2 – (China)
- K-5 – (India)
