= Kim Yun-sim =

North Korean fleet admiral (1923–2021)

- 김윤심

Personal details
- Born: 1923 Korea, Empire of Japan
- Died: c. June 2021 (aged 98)
- Citizenship: North Korean
- Party: Workers' Party of Korea
- Occupation: Military officer, politician

Military service
- Allegiance: North Korea
- Branch/service: Korean People's Army
- Rank: Admiral

Kim Yun-sim (Korean: 김윤심; 1923 – c. June 2021) was a North Korean politician and fleet admiral. He served as commander of the Korean People's Navy.

== Biography ==
In May 1977, Kim Yun-sim served as division commander of the Korean People's Army, and was appointed commander of the West Sea Fleet in July 1991. In November 1996, he was promoted to lieutenant general in the People's Army and admiral in the People's Navy in April 1997, respectively. He was appointed naval commander in June 1997. In April 2002, he was promoted to captain of the People's Army. In December 2007, he withdrew from the position of naval commander. In September 1998, he was elected the 10th delegate of the Supreme People's Assembly, and in September 2003 he was elected the 11th delegate.

In February 2012, he received the Kim Jong Il Medal.

Kim died around June 2021, at the age of 98.

Military offices
Preceded by ?	Commander of the Korean People's Navy; 1997–2007	Succeeded by Jong Myong-do
