= Kim Myong-sik (politician) =

North Korean military commander and politician

Fleet Admiral Kim Myong-sik

Deputy Chief of the General Staff
- Incumbent
- Assumed office March 2016
- Supreme Commander: Kim Jong Un
- Chief: Pak Jong-chon

Commander of the East Sea Fleet
- In office July 2009 – April 2013

Commander of the Korean People's Army Naval Force
- In office April 2013 – April 2015
- Supreme Commander: Kim Jong Un
- Succeeded by: Ri Yong-ju
- Incumbent
- Assumed office Unknown
- Supreme Commander: Kim Jong Un
- Preceded by: Ri Yong-ju

Personal details
- Born: Unknown Korea, Empire of Japan
- Party: Workers' Party of Korea
- Occupation: Military officer, politician

Military service
- Allegiance: North Korea
- Branch/service: Korean People's Army
- Rank: Fleet Admiral

Kim Myong-sik (Korean: 김명식) is a North Korean officer; he served as the commander of the Korean People's Navy.

== Biography ==
Although his past life is unknown, it was confirmed in July 2009 that he became the commander of the East Sea Fleet. He was promoted to lieutenant general of the People's Army in February 2012, but was demoted to major general in March 2013, and was promoted to lieutenant general again a month later. From April 2013 to April 2015, he served as commander of the Korean People's Navy. While serving as a naval commander, he was promoted in May 2014, but was demoted to major general again in May 2016. Since March 2016, he has served as deputy chief of the General Staff Department of the Korean People's Army. In 2019 he was elected to the 14th convocation of the Supreme People's Assembly. In 2017 he was promoted to admiral, re-appointed naval commander, and promoted to a member of the Party Central Committee. He was promoted to admiral in 2019 and attended the 70th anniversary ceremony of the Chinese People's Liberation Army Navy in Qingdao on April 23. On October 10, 2020, he led a navy parade column during the parade to celebrate the 75th anniversary of the founding of the Workers' Party of Korea. He retired from the post of naval commander at the 1st enlarged meeting of the 8th Central Military Commission of the Workers' Party of Korea held on February 24, 2021 and was replaced by Kim Song-gil. In July 2021, he was demoted but returned to general rank in April 2022.

== Awards and honors ==
A picture of Kim shows him wearing the ribbons to all decorations awarded to him.

Military offices
Preceded by Jong Myong-do	Commander of the Korean People's Navy; 2013–2015	Succeeded by Ri Yong-ju
