= Hwasong-11S =

North Korean submarine-launched ballistic missile

- Type: Submarine-launched ballistic missile Short-range ballistic missile
- Place of origin: North Korea

Service history
- In service: 2021–present
- Used by: Korean People's Army Strategic Force

Production history
- Designed: 2021

Specifications
- Length: 6.8–8.45 m (22.3–27.7 ft)
- Diameter: 1.0–1.1 m (3 ft 3 in – 3 ft 7 in)
- Warhead: Tactical nuclear warhead
- Engine: Solid-propelled engine
- Operational range: Reported: 600 km (370 mi)
- Launch platform: Submarine, submersible barge, underwater silo, destroyer

The Hwasong-11S (Note: Also known as Hwasong-11ㅅ (mixing Latin and Korean characters) and KN-33 (reported external designation).) (Korean: 《화성포-11ㅅ》형; lit. 'Mars Artillery Type 11S') is a North Korean solid-fueled submarine-launched ballistic missile (SLBM). First displayed in October 2021 during a military exhibition, Hwasong-11S is the underwater-launched version of Hwasong-11A (KN-23). Its first test-fire occurred on 19 October 2021, after the exhibition.

== Description ==
Images of the Hwasong-11S
- In the "Self-Defence 2021" exhibition
- September 2022 test

Hwasong-11S is the underwater-launched variant of Hwasong-11A. The missile is also claimed to have a ground-based version that was first tested on 16 April 2022, later identified as Hwasong-11D. Its reported range is about 600 km (370 mi). The estimated length and diameter are between 6.8–8.45 m (22.3–27.7 ft) and 1.0–1.1 m (3 ft 3 in – 3 ft 7 in) respectively. Hwasong-11S is capable of carrying the Hwasan-31 tactical nuclear warhead. German analyst Norbert Brügge claimed the missile to be a modified version of Pukguksong-1 with two stages, a longer body and a longer warhead.

Hwasong-11S utilizes a solid-fueled engine and a single-stage design with four bumps around the tail section. Four grid fins, which folded before launch, are located between the four bumps. After its maiden launch, it was determined that the bumps and grid fins were a part of the gas generator. The new missile also features improved control, such as "flank" and "gliding skip" mobilities.

Information from the 19 October 2021 launch suggests that the missile is fitted with a gas generator to cold launch out of the submarine's missile tube into the air, before the ignition of main engine. Compared to previous North Korean SLBMs like the Pukguksong-1 and its larger derivatives, it retains the depressed trajectory and manoeuvring flight characteristics of Hwasong-11A to try to evade missile defence systems. Since it is based on a missile with a shorter range than the Pukguksong-series, the submarine would need to get closer to its target in order to launch, leaving it more vulnerable to detection and destruction before it can be fired. Its development may be more of a political statement than an effort to create a viable weapon, as the test occurred weeks after South Korea tested their own Hyunmoo-2B's SLBM version, Hyunmoo 4-4, both of which are derived from the same Iskander design base. Such a small SLBM means more missiles can be stored on a submarine, enabling North Korea to counter their enemy's ballistic missile submarines.

Based on information and photos from the 25 September 2022 launch, it was determined that the missile was launched from a silo under a reservoir. However, it is likely the missile was fired from a submersible barge containing launch silos. It is unknown whether such a system will be pursued as a serious launch method, or if it was a demonstration of another capability to deter South Korean preemption strategies by adding another potential deployment method. It is possible that this lake-borne launcher is designed to be an operational weapon system.

== History ==
North Korea first displayed Hwasong-11S in October 2021, during the "Self-Defence 2021" military exhibition without revealing its official name. In the exhibition, the missile was displayed beside two SLBMs: Pukguksong-1 and Pukguksong-5. Due to its small size compared to the Pukguksong-series SLBM, it was unofficially called as "small SLBM".

About one week after the exhibition, on 19 October 2021, Hwasong-11S was first test-fired from the 8.24 Yongung experimental ballistic missile submarine. Several months later, eight Hwasong-11S missiles were displayed during the 25 April 2022 military parade. Further test-fires occurred on 7 May and 25 September 2022; however, North Korean state media only confirmed the latter.

The missile's official name was revealed in the KCNA's report on the new Hwasan-31 nuclear warhead in late March 2023.

According to the International Institute for Strategic Studies (IISS), as of 2025, North Korea is possessing "some" Hwasong-11S launchers, assessed as "in test" by the IISS.

== List of tests ==
| Attempt | Date | Location | Outcome | Additional notes | References |
|---|---|---|---|---|---|
| 1 | 19 October 2021 | Sinpo-class submarine, located at Sinpo Shipyard, South Hamgyong Province | Success | The first known SLBM test of North Korea since 2019, South Korea detected the launch around 10:17 a.m. and claimed the missile travelled 590 km (370 mi) and reached an altitude of 60 km (37 mi). Japanese statement initially claimed the launch of two missiles, but later retracted it and confirmed only one missile was fired. According to North Korean state media, the launch was conducted by Academy of Defence Sciences. North Korea called Hwasong-11S as "new type submarine-launched ballistic missile" instead of its formal name. | |
| 2 | 7 May 2022 | Sinpo, South Hamgyong Province | Unknown | North Korean state media did not release any statements about the launch. The missile flew 600 km (370 mi) for less than 18 minutes, achieved 60 km (37 mi) apogee and used an irregular trajectory. According to the Yonhap News Agency, the submarine was repaired before the launch, conducted only three days before Yoon Suk Yeol's inauguration. | |
| 3 | 25 September 2022 | Taechon Reservoir, North Pyongan Province | Success | The missile was launched from an underwater silo that located under an inland reservoir. It flew to a distance of 600 km (370 mi) on an irregular trajectory and achieved an altitude of 60 km (37 mi). North Korea referred to the launch as "the simulation of loading tactical nuclear warheads", with Kim Jong Un attending. | |

== Ship and submarine compatibility ==
=== Choe Hyon destroyer ===
During the launch of the Choe Hyon destroyer on 25 April 2025, a ballistic missile model that apparently similar to Hwasong-11S was displayed.

Photos from North Korean state media, as well as information from the test of the ship's weapon on 28 and 29 April 2025 indicate that the destroyer is planned to carry 10 Hwasong-11S missiles in large vertical launcher.

=== 8.24 Yongung ===
The first successful launch of Hwasong-11S in October 2021 was conducted using a Sinpo-class submarine, called 8.24 Yongung.

=== Hero Kim Kun Ok submarine ===
The Hero Kim Kun Ok submarine, which was unveiled in September 2023, is capable to carrying up to four Hwasong-11S missiles in four larger launch tubes.

== See also ==
Other variants of Hwasong-11A

- Hwasong-11C
- Hwasong-11D
- Hwasong-11E

Comparable missiles

- Pukguksong-1
- Hyunmoo 4-4
- K-15
