= Jong Myong-do =

North Korean politician and fleet admiral

Personal details
- Born: Korea, Empire of Japan
- Citizenship: North Korean
- Party: Workers' Party of Korea
- Occupation: Military officer, politician

Military service
- Allegiance: North Korea
- Branch/service: Korean People's Army
- Rank: Admiral

Jong Myong-do (Korean: 정명도) is a North Korean politician and fleet admiral. He served as commander of the Korean People's Navy as well as member of the Supreme People's Assembly from the 10th convocation.

== Biography ==
Little is known about the professional career of Jong Myong-do until 1997, when he was promoted to a two-star general. Member of the Supreme People's Assembly, the unicameral parliament, from the 10th convocation.

In December 2007, he was promoted to the position of Navy Commander of the Korean People's Navy with the promotion of three-star colonel general. He served in that role until July 2012, when he was replaced by Kim Myong-sik. From that moment, he appeared many times alongside Kim Jong Il during numerous visits to military units.

In April 2010 he was awarded the rank of four-star general. During the 3rd Workers' Party of Korea Conference on September 28, 2010, he was elected a member of the Central Military Commission, the body of the Workers' Party of Korea responsible for military affairs, and also sat on the Central Committee for the first time.

After the death of the Supreme Leader Kim Jong Il in December 2011, Jong Myong-do was in 65th place in the 232-person Funeral Committee. This testified to the formal and actual belonging of Jŏng Myŏng to the close political leadership of the Democratic People's Republic of Korea. According to specialists, places on such lists defined the rank of a politician in the hierarchy of the power apparatus.

Military offices
Preceded by Kim Yun-sim	Commander of the Korean People's Navy; 2007–2012	Succeeded by Kim Myong-sik
