= Yu Chang-kwon =

Rear Admiral Yu Chang Kwon (or Kwon Yu-chang) was the Commander-in-Chief of the Korean People's Navy from sometime before 1975 or from 1975 until some time in 1982 or after 1982.
