= Ri Yong-ju =

North Korean admiral

Fleet Admiral Ri Yong-ju

Commander of the Korean People's Army Naval Force
- In office April 2015 – Unknown
- Supreme Commander: Kim Jong Un
- Preceded by: Kim Myong-sik
- Succeeded by: Kim Myong-sik

Personal details
- Born: Korea, Empire of Japan
- Citizenship: North Korean
- Party: Workers' Party of Korea
- Occupation: Military officer, politician

Military service
- Allegiance: North Korea
- Branch/service: Korean People's Army
- Rank: Fleet Admiral

Ri Yong-ju (Korean: 리용주) is an admiral and politician of North Korea and a candidate member of the Central Committee of the Workers' Party of Korea. He was member of the 12th convocation of the Supreme People's Assembly. He is currently the commander of the Korean People's Navy.

== Biography ==
After being promoted to Lieutenant General, he served as a delegate to the 12th Supreme People's Assembly in March 2009 as representative of the 548th electoral district. He served as a candidate member of the Central Committee of the Workers' Party of Korea, and in March 2014, as representative of the 13th convocation of the Supreme People's Assembly for the District 449. In December 2011 he participated at the funeral committee which organized the state funeral of Kim Jong Il.

In April 2015, he succeeded Kim Myong-sik as the Navy commander. In August, he was promoted to admiral, and in April 2016, he became a member of the Central Committee of the Korean Workers' Party.

Military offices
Preceded by Kim Myong-sik	Commander of the Korean People's Navy; 2014-current	Succeeded by incumbent
