= Kim Song-gil =

North Korean general

- 김성길

Commander of the Korean People's Navy
- Incumbent
- Assumed office February 2021
- Preceded by: Kim Myong-sik
- Supreme Commander: Kim Jong Un

Personal details
- Party: Workers' Party of Korea

Military service
- Allegiance: North Korea
- Branch/service: Korean People's Army
- Rank: Vice Admiral

Kim Song-gil (Korean: 김성길) is a North Korean general. He is serving as the commander of the Korean People's Navy.

== Biography ==
Very little information is known about him. He served in the 9th Squadron in Chodori, Nampo-si, and then served in the staff of the West Sea Fleet. On February 24, 2021, at the 1st expanded meeting of the 8th Central Military Commission of the Workers' Party of Korea, his predecessor Kim Myong-sik was dismissed, and he was promoted to lieutenant general of the navy and appointed as the new commander of the navy.

Military offices
Preceded by Kim Myong-sik	Commander of the Korean People's Navy; February 2021-current	Succeeded by incumbent
