= Battle of Haeju =

Small naval battle during the Korean War

- Part of the Korean War
Date	September 10, 1950
Location	off Haeju Bay, Korea, in the Yellow Sea
Result	United Nations victory

Belligerents
United Nations: South Korea	North Korea

Units involved
Republic of Korea Navy	Korean People's Navy

Strength
1 patrol boat	1 minelayer

Casualties and losses
None	Unknown human casualties, 1 minelayer sunk

The Battle of Haeju was a small naval battle during the main phase of the Korean War.

Off Haeju Bay in the Yellow Sea, on September 10, 1950, days before the Battle of Inchon, a South Korean navy patrol boat, PC-703, encountered a North Korean navy minelayer sailing vessel. After a brief fight, the North Korean minelayer was sunk with a loss of all crew and no South Korean casualties were reported.

After the minelayer's sinking, PC-703 discovered that the sunken vessel had laid a mine field at the mouth of the Haeju Man and then reported to base the location of the sea mines. Two days later on September 12, PC-703 encountered three small transports and sank them. The three supply vessels were most likely unarmed.

== See also ==
- List of border incidents involving North Korea
