= Sinpo station (Pyongra Line) =

Railway station in North Korea

Coordinates: 40.0380°N 128.2071°E

Sinp'o station (Korean: 신포역) is a railway station in Sinp'o, South Hamgyŏng, North Korea. It is on located on the P'yŏngra line of the Korean State Railway.
