= Pukguksong-3 =

- Type: Submarine-launched ballistic missile
- Place of origin: North Korea

Service history
- In service: 2019–present

Production history
- Manufacturer: North Korea
- Produced: 2017–present

Specifications
- Length: 9.15 m (30.0 ft) (with warhead)
- Width: 1.4 m (4.6 ft)
- Warhead: conventional, possibly nuclear
- Propellant: solid fuel
- Operational range: 1,900–2,500 km (1,200–1,600 mi) (estimated)
- Guidance system: Inertial guidance system
- Launch platform: submersible barge, Sinpo-C

- Pukguksong-3
- Chosŏn'gŭl: 《북극성-3》형
- Hancha: 北極星三形
- Revised Romanization: Bukgeukseong-sam hyeong
- McCune–Reischauer: Pukkŭksŏng-sam hyŏng

The Pukguksong-3 (Note: Also known as KN-26 under the U.S. naming convention and 19-6 SLBM under the South Korean naming convention.) (Korean: 《북극성-3》형; lit. 'Polaris Type 3') is a North Korean two-stage, submarine-launched ballistic missile, likely based on the same motor that powers the Pukguksong-2. First revealed in August 2017 through photo evidence; however, the missile had its first successful flight test on 2 October 2019, two years after its first appearance.

== Description ==
Images of the Pukguksong-3
- Launch of the missile

The Pukguksong-3 is a further development from the Pukguksong-2, sharing the same 1.4 m (4.6 ft) diameter, as well as the two-stage, solid-fueled design. With an estimated range of 1,900–2,500 km (1,200–1,600 mi), Pukguksong-3 is capable of striking any US military bases in East Asian region. It also uses inertial guidance system combined with improvements, maintaining acceptable accuracy within its range. Compared to older missiles, the Pukguksong-3 likely represents an incremental step forward in SLBM development, possibly towards an eventual, standardised missile. It is considered to be the largest solid-fueled ballistic missile tested by North Korea as of October 2019.

A report from the Center for the National Interest states that the Pukguksong-3 is intended to move away from the Pukguksong-1 design, instead of following up on it. According to this analysis, the missile is a new platform that would likely improve North Korea's second strike capability.

German analyst Norbert Brügge claimed that the Pukguksong-3 had a variant similar in appearance to the Pukguksong-1, which was displayed in the 15 April 2017 military parade and the "Self-Defence 2021" military exhibition. However, the actual missile displayed in these events was Pukguksong-1.

== History ==
The first information about Pukguksong-3 was released on 22 August 2017, when images of filament wound casing were shown with a larger diameter of 1.4 m (4.6 ft), along with the official name of the missile, on a display in the background of a photo. The image showed a Pukguksong-3 missile in a canister and revealed that it would be a two-stage, solid-fuel missile. Prior to this, there was a string of ejection tests at Sinpo, although it could not be confirmed that the testing involved the Pukguksong-3.

Later, Pukguksong-3 was first test-fired on 2 October 2019.

== List of tests ==
There has been one known test of the Pukguksong-3:

Attempt	Date	Location	Pre-launch announcement / detection	Outcome	Additional notes	References
1	2 October 2019, around 7:11am Pyongyang Standard Time	Off Wonsan	None	Success	This was the first successful test of the Pukguksong-3. It was fired without a reentry warhead and used a lofted trajectory, and did not have the previously seen skirt with grid fins, like the previous Pukguksong-1 launches from underwater barges. Kim Jong Un reportedly did not attend the test, although photos released by Korean Central Television were alleged to have been modified, such that a drinking cup was removed, which, according to the report, suggests that he might have attended the test. The missile was fired to a range of 450 km (240 nmi) at an apogee of 910 km (490 nmi), which means a range with a normal trajectory of at least 1,900 km (1,000 nmi).	

== Deployment ==
The missile is likely to be deployed to the new Sinpo-C submarine under construction, as the current Sinpo-B submarine, which fits the Pukguksong-1 missile, would not fit the larger Pukguksong-3 missile. The new ballistic missile submarine is based on the Romeo-class submarine, and is likely to be fitted with three launch tubes for missiles. However, the position of the tubes would likely result in reduced space for the battery compartment, and thus reduce its underwater endurance, possibly reducing it to half of the original capacity. As the submarine is still under construction, it may instead be launched to fire the newer, and even larger Pukguksong-5 missiles instead. Even with these modifications, however, it is unlikely that the Romeo-class submarine will reach 3,000 tons as reported by South Korean media, and as such, a possibility of a conversion based on a Golf-class submarine is also possible.

== Further developments ==
=== Pukguksong-4 ===
At the 10 October 2020 parade commemorating the 75th anniversary of the founding of the Workers' Party of Korea, a new missile was displayed and was named as Pukguksong-4. According to German expert Norbert Brügge, it is significantly increased in size compared to the Pukguksong-3, both in diameter and length. Unlike the Pukguksong-3, it was seen with a Korean People's Army Ground Force escort and the missile did not appear to have an actual separation mechanism for its two stages. Portions of the engine appeared to be filament-wound to make the missile lighter and allow for a greater range and payload. Its range is likely to be similar or greater than the Pukguksong-3, although it has never been tested. South Korean Chief of Naval Operations Boo Suk-jong mentioned that the name written in these missiles was Pukguksong-4S (북극성-4ㅅ; lit. 'Polaris 4S'), not Pukguksong-4A (북극성-4A; lit. 'Polaris 4A'). Also he mentioned that the letter 'ㅅ' may stand for "sujung" (수중; lit. 'underwater') or "susang" (수상; lit. 'water surface').

=== Pukguksong-5 ===
At a parade on 14 January 2021, another SLBM variant was displayed and was designated as Pukguksong-5. It shared the design of the previous two missiles, however with a pointed nose cone and longer payload shroud for a greater overall length. The appearance of yet another untested missile likely indicates North Korea is still in the process of settling on a specific SLBM design.

=== Pukguksong-6 ===
Another SLBM variant of Pukguksong-3 was displayed at the 25 April 2022 military parade. The official name of this missile variant is presumed to be Pukguksong-6; its length is longer than Pukguksong-4 and Pukguksong-5.

== See also ==
- M2 – (France)
- UGM-73 Poseidon – (United States)
