= Pukguksong-1 =

North Korean submarine-launched ballistic missile

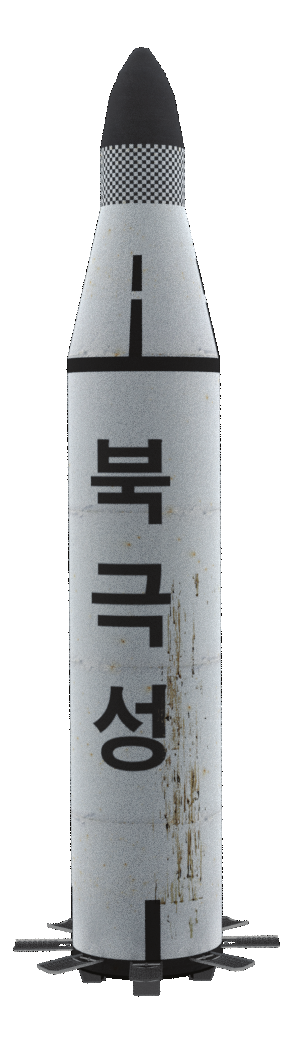
- Artist rendition of the missile
- Type: Submarine-launched ballistic missile
- Place of origin: North Korea

Service history
- In service: 2016–2017 (South Korean estimates); 2018 (US estimates)
- Used by: North Korea

Production history
- Manufacturer: North Korea
- Produced: 2015 (first known test year)
- Variants: Claimed: Pukguksong-2 and Hwasong-11S

Specifications
- Height: 7.05 metres (23.1 ft); 7.4 metres (24 ft) (with grid fins)
- Diameter: 1.07–1.13 metres (3.5–3.7 ft)
- Warhead: nuclear, conventional
- Engine: Liquid-propelled engine (2015); Solid-propelled engine (2016)
- Operational range: 500–2,500 km (310–1,550 mi) (estimated)
- Launch platform: Sinpo-class submarine

- Pukguksong-1
- Hangul: 북극성-1
- Hanja: 北極星-1
- RR: Bukgeukseong-1
- MR: Pukkŭksŏng-1

The Pukguksong-1 (Note: Also known as Pukkŭksŏng-1, Bukgeukseong-1.) (Korean: 북극성-1; lit. 'Polaris 1'), (Note: North Korea officially calls the missile as Pukguksong (《북극성》; lit. 'Polaris') only.) also known as KN-11 (Note: The KN number is the designation used by United States for describing North Korean missiles.) in intelligence communities outside North Korea, is a North Korean two-stage solid-fueled submarine-launched ballistic missile (SLBM) that had a complete, successful test on 24 August 2016.

North Korea has never announced the actual operational range and payload, as this technical information is probably considered classified.

== Design ==
In 2015, the missile was first launched with a liquid-fueled engine. Later, North Korea replaced the liquid-fueled engine with a solid-fueled one for later test fires.

According to German analyst Norbert Brügge, the earlier launches, conducted from a barge, did not feature grid fins, while the later submarine launched missiles did. The difference between the Pukguksong-1 and the Pukguksong-3 are the missile diameter, with the -1 being about 1.1 metres (3.6 ft) in diameter, while the -3 is about 1.4 metres (4.6 ft), like the Pukguksong-2, an older model Pukguksong-3 also exist, with a similar pointed nose cone.

The missile's range is estimated to be 500–2,500 km (310–1,550 mi).

The Pukguksong-1 is claimed to have two variants: one is the land-based road-mobile medium-range ballistic missile Pukguksong-2, and the other, according to Norbert Brügge, is an SLBM first tested in 2021, later identified as Hwasong-11S.

=== Solid fuel motor in other missiles ===
The Hwasong-11A (KN-23), which is usually reported as an Iskander clone likely uses a Pukguksong-1 solid fuel motor with a different nozzle. Compared to the Iskander, it is noticeably wider and larger; it likely has the same 1.1 metres (3.6 ft) diameter as the Pukguksong-1 and thus shares the engine. Similarly, while the Hwasong-11B (KN-24) is similar to the MGM-140 ATACMS, it is much larger than it with a 1.1 metres (3.6 ft) diameter; it is thus likely to be similar to the Pukguksong-1, but having only one stage.

The motors, at around 1.1 metres (3.6 ft) in diameter, used in these missiles likely derive from the solid fuel motors of the Soviet RT-15, possibly originally acquired for scrap. The casing is made of an unknown metal and the nozzle is likely made from carbon fibre composites, which have been displayed on television.

== List of tests ==
Attempt	Date	Location	Pre-launch announcement / detection	Outcome	Additional notes	Reference(s)
1	October 2014	Sinpo	None	Unknown	Land-based static ejection test only.	
2	November 2014	Sinpo	None	Unknown	Land-based static ejection test only.	
3	23 January 2015	Sinpo	None	Success	The launch was claimed to be carried out from a sea-based platform or a vertical launch system.	
4	22 April 2015	Sinpo	None	Success	South Korean officials later stated it was an "ejection test" to evaluate ejecting a submerged ballistic missile, rather than a full test of a new missile system, and that the test missile seemed to have been launched from a submerged barge rather than a submarine.	
5	9 May 2015	Unknown	None	Success (North Korea); Partial success (United States and South Korea)	Kim Jong Un oversaw the test. The missile was named as Pukguksong-1. However, United States and South Korean officials pointed out that the missile was fired from an underwater barge rather than a submarine, and that it flew only 100 m (330 ft) above the water.	
6	28 November 2015	Sea of Japan	None	Failure	Reportedly, the missile was fired from a Sinpo-class submarine and did not successfully eject, resulting in damage to the conning tower of the submarine. Sources further claimed that South Korea found the cover of the capsule where the missile was placed. Within a month, satellite photos of a shipyard at the east coast site of Sinpo suggested that the submarine used in the test remains seaworthy and that development and testing activity of the SLBM may continue. The imagery also showed construction of facilities that could accommodate the building of larger submarines.	
7	21 December 2015	Sinpo	None	Success (North Korea); Failure (South Korea)	Further analysis of the published video suggested that while the missile was successfully ejected from the launch tube, it exploded upon ignition. North Korea released footage of the launch in January 2016, which South Korea claimed was manipulated to show a successful test that didn't occur. This test was from a submerged barge, likely so as not to risk damaging the launch submarine again. Video showed the 10-ton missile firing directly vertical out of the water, unlike the first test that emerged at a distinct angle. The first stage of the engine ignited, but the rest of the footage was inconsistently spliced to give the appearance of continued flight.	
8	16 March 2016	Sinpo	None	Unknown	Land-based static ejection test only.	
9	23 April 2016	Sinpo	None	Success (North Korea); Partial success (South Korea)	The missile only flew 30 km (19 mi) and fell short of the expected minimum range of 300 km (190 mi). However, North Korean state media claimed success. According to North Korea, the missile was launched from its maximum underwater depth, and the "cold launch" ejection mechanism, solid-fueled rocket engine, the flight controls and warhead release systems worked correctly. South Korea military sources reckoned that North Korea is trying to build a new 3,000-ton submarine capable of arming three such missiles. The same source also claims that the current Sinpo-class submarine can only launch at about 10–15 m (33–49 ft) below water's surface, which is much shallower than other, bigger submarines that can launch at around 50 m (160 ft) and therefore that the Sinpo-class submarines will face higher risk of detection by anti-submarine forces. The United States sources did not make any acknowledgement of or denies this report's credibility.	
10	9 July 2016, about 11:30 am Pyongyang Standard Time	Sinpo	None	Failure	South Korea claims that the SLBM confirms the missile ejected from the Sinpo-class submarine successfully, but it appeared to have exploded "at an altitude of some 10 km (6.2 mi) and a distance of merely a few kilometers" after the missile was fired and hence the initial flight was likely a failure. The same report cited the South Korea military, which has also confirmed that North Korea has made progress with the initial undersea ejection stage of the SLBM technology and the Pukguksong-1 is currently in the flight test stage. South Korea military believes that North Korea might be able to deploy the Pukguksong-1 by 2019. The U.S. Strategic Command concluded that the missile from this test fell into the Sea of Japan. North Korea likely used this test as a way to protest against the United States for two decisions made within the previous day, including the decision to install THAAD in South Korea, which was opposed by China and Russia. North Korea did not release any press release about the test.	
11	24 August 2016, about 5:30 am Pyongyang Standard Time	Sinpo	None	Success	This is the first successful full-range test. The missile flew about 500 km (310 mi) and reached Japan's air defense identification zone. A report noted that this launch comes the same day as foreign ministers of China, Japan and South Korea are scheduled to meet in Tokyo and also two days after arch-rival South Korea and the United States began Ulchi-Freedom Guardian exercise in the South. The experts acknowledged that North Korea's repeated tests shows considerable progress that has raised the possibility of a missile launched in lofted trajectory. The South Korea military later confirmed the launch was indeed in lofted trajectory, without specifying exact apogee, unlike the Hwasong-10 successful test in June 2016.	
12	December 2016	Sinpo	None	Unknown	Land-based static ejection test only.	

As of 2019, there have been no further flight tests.

== Strategic implications ==
The Pukguksong-1 is the first sign of a North Korean sea-based nuclear deterrent, which complicates the U.S. and South Korean ability to preemptively destroy the country's nuclear capabilities by threatening a second strike. While there is a chance to take out land-based nuclear sites, ballistic missile submarines ensure that a retaliatory strike could still be launched before it can be found and neutralized.

North Korea's unique circumstances limit the ways such a capability could be employed. It is thought that the country needs more time to develop submarines for reliably deploying weapons like the Pukguksong-1 missile.

Given their submarines' insufficient power to outrun U.S. Navy nuclear attack submarines and lack of aerial and surface coverage to protect them out to long distances, they cannot venture far out to sea, although a scenario where a missile-equipped sub travels into the Sea of Japan on a "suicide mission" to fire the Pukguksong-1 before it expects to inevitably get destroyed is not implausible given the loyalty of the elite crewmen of the submarine force.

A more likely scenario would be deployment along the Korean coastline within North Korean local air and surface cover and silent movement into or out of various hiding spots like bays, inlets, and outer isles before achievement of a pre-designated position, with quiet submerged operation on battery power; because of its finite power capacity, the sub would have to surface or snorkel for air to recharge its batteries if it remains hiding for an extended period, making it vulnerable to anti-submarine warfare (ASW) efforts.

A land based, mobile derivative of the Pukguksong-1 would significantly complicate U.S., Japan and South Korean defenses. Unlike the liquid fueled Rodong or SCUD derivatives, the solid fueled Pukguksong-1 can be fired at a much shorter notification time. The North Korean have since achieved this with the Pukguksong-2, a land-based, mobile derivative of the Pukguksong-1 first tested on 12 February 2017.

=== First completely successful test ===
On 24 August 2016 at around 5:30 am (Pyongyang Standard Time), North Korea successfully tested the Pukguksong-1 as the missile flew 500 km (310 mi) into Japan's ADIZ without issue. Unlike the recent successful Hwasong-10 flight, KCNA did not officially announce the test until a day later, calling it a great success on the part of Kim Jong Un. The entire development has since been published worldwide.

In light of recent development of the Pukguksong-1, South Korean military sources concluded that the first successful Pukguksong-1 test was in fact launched in lofted trajectory. This is without confirmation of the actual apogee, and therefore the range could have been at least 1,000 km (620 mi) or more had the missile launched in normal trajectory and could be operationally deployed as early as 2017. Hawkish forces in South Korea have renewed calls for South Korea to construct nuclear submarines to counter North Korea's 'provocation'.

However, the US-Korea Institute at Johns Hopkins University rejected South Korean claims that the Pukguksong-1 could be operationally deployed before 2017, suggesting its initial operational capability will not be achieved before June 2018. Specifically, North Korea still faces significant technological challenges, including building a new class of submarine to carry three such missiles at once.

On 30 August 2016, David Wright, a missile expert and co-director of the Union of Concerned Scientists' Global Security Program, suggested that the apogee achieved by this test was 550 km (340 mi) and the range would have been 1,250 km (780 mi), assuming the same payload on standard trajectory.

On the same day, the South Korean media reported that Jeffrey Lewis, director of the East Asia Nonproliferation Program at the James Martin Center for Nonproliferation Studies (CNS), since recommends that South Korea deploy 2 batteries of THAAD instead of 1 in order to counter the possibility of North Korea's firing a Pukguksong-1 outside its 120-degree field of vision. However, Lewis also stressed that it does little to address the possibility of lofted attack, because the missile's reentry in lofted trajectory will be at very high speeds and at a very steep angle, the ability of THAAD interception depending on the missile range. He also noted that THAAD was never field tested against an intermediate-range target or on an unusual angle of attack. With this in mind, he ended by suggesting it is time to use diplomatic measures for dissuading North Korea from enhancing such capabilities and defense measures. This is a very ineffective strategy, since North Korea has the ability to use numerous counter-measures for every measures the US and South Korea have.

=== Suspected Chinese involvement in North Korea's SLBM technology proliferation ===
On 3 September 2016, US expert Bruce Bechtol, a North Korea expert at Angelo State University, and another South Korean national security researcher, Shin Jong-woo, claimed that China must have provided North Korea with the relevant SLBM technologies, since it took a mere 4 months from the first successful cold launch test (23 April 2016) to the first complete test (24 August 2016) and further claimed that the Pukguksong-1 is a carbon-copy of first China's first SLBM, JL-1. In comparison, China took 15 years to develop JL-1. Bruce Bechtol also stated his analysis is supported by space program expert Tal Inbar of Israel's Fisher Institute. However, Dave Schmerler of the James Martin Center of Non Proliferation Studies noted that the North Korean missile used a single engine design (the JL-1 used four engines) and grid fins for flight stability, features not found on the Chinese JL-1, and urged caution in jumping to conclusions. He added that the single-engine design had more in common with the Iranian Sejjil MRBM than the JL-1.

==== Response from China to alleged proliferation activities ====
On 5 September 2016, the Chinese media refuted the report by citing that the People's Republic of China as a Nuclear Non-Proliferation Treaty signatory state and stating that one of the permanent members of United Nations Security Council would never proliferate by providing or selling nuclear and missile-related technologies to North Korea. (Note: The actual excerpts are as follows: 作为联合国安理会常任理事国、《核不扩散条约》缔约国，中国绝对不会向朝鲜提供或者出售与核武器和弹道导弹相关的装备和技术。) This report also states that some US experts and think-tanks have all along been irresponsible in making defamatory statements about China, as they unreasonably link North Korea's nuclear capability to China and have sought to use media influence to pressure China. This report does not contain actual evidence of supposed proliferation on China's part. (Note: The actual excerpts read as follows: 一些美国媒体和智库一向很擅长将朝鲜的涉核问题与中国进行无端挂钩，就是希望通过这种方式向中国施压，而这些说法通常没有任何证据，是很不负责任的。)

== See also ==
- Sagarika – (India)
- JL-1 – (China)
- M1 – (France)
- R-27 – (Soviet Union)
