= Battle of Chumonchin Chan =

1950 naval battle of the Korean War

- Part of the Korean War
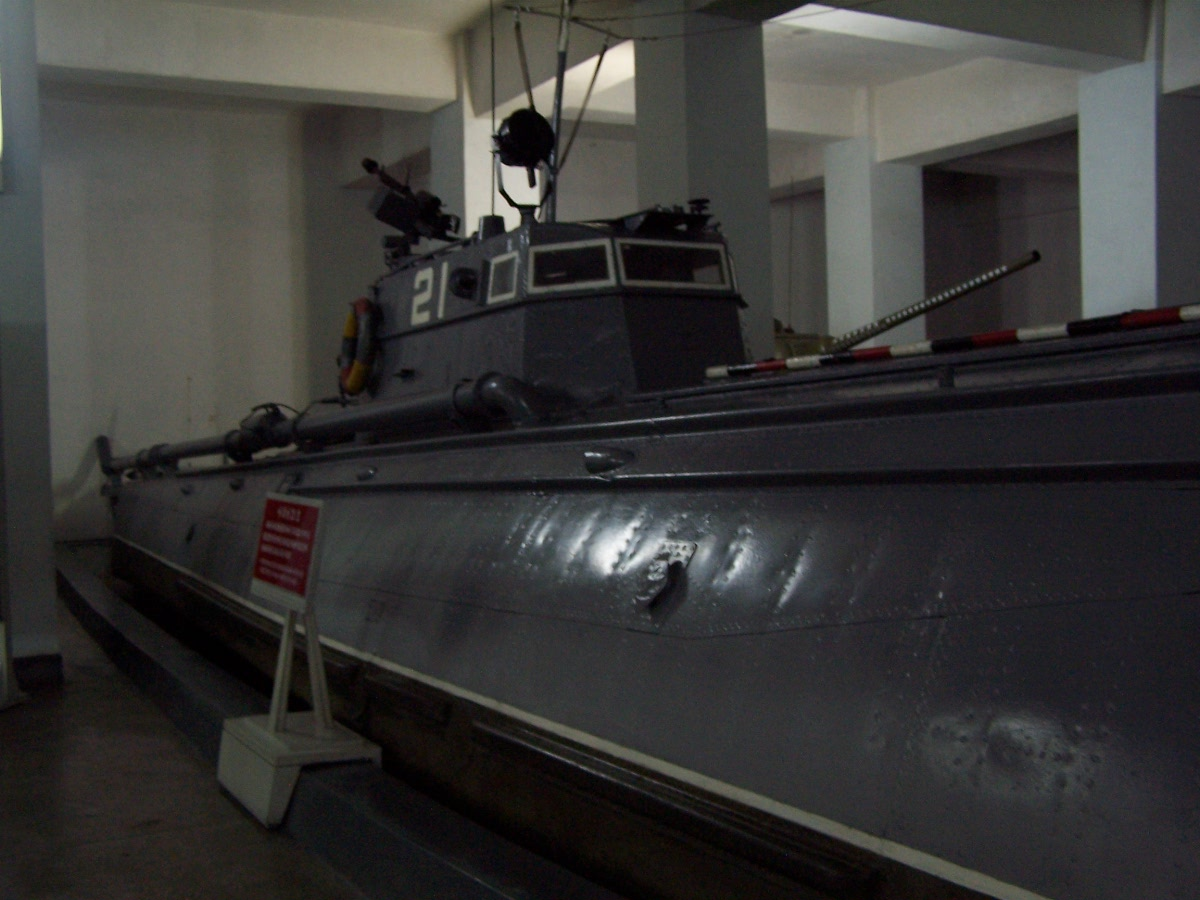
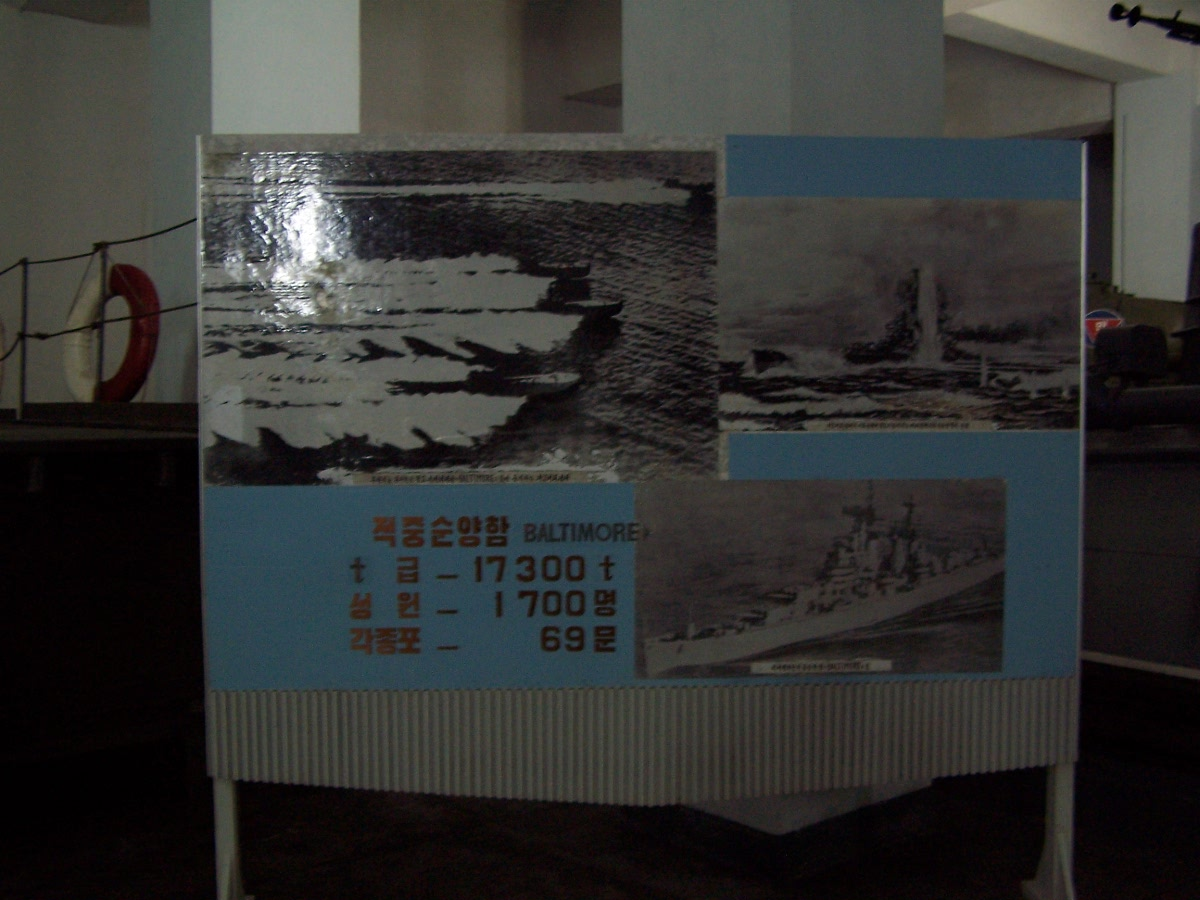
- Torpedo boat No.21 on display at the Museum of Victory of the Fatherland Liberation War, Pyongyang. North Korean propaganda mistaking a United Nations forces ship for USS Baltimore (CA-68) which was never deployed to the Korean War. It also claims the heavy cruiser was sunk by North Korean torpedo boats during the battle.
Date	July 2, 1950
Location	off Chumonchin Port, Sea of Japan
Result	United Nations victory

Belligerents
United Nations: United Kingdom; United States	North Korea

Commanders and leaders
Jesse D. Sowell	Kim Kun Ok

Strength
2 cruisers 1 Black Swan-class sloop	4 G-5-class motor torpedo boats 2 gunboats 10 ammunition ships

Casualties and losses
None	Unknown human casualties, 3 torpedo boats sunk

The Battle of Chumonchin Chan or the action of 2 July 1950 was fought between surface combatants during the main phase of the Korean War. It began after an Allied flotilla encountered a Korean People's Navy supply fleet.

== Battle ==
On 2 July 1950, USS Juneau, HMS Black Swan, and HMS Jamaica were sailing along the coast of the Sea of Japan when they encountered four North Korean G-5-class torpedo and gunboats that had just finished escorting a flotilla of ten ammunition ships up the coast. The North Korean torpedo boats began an attack on the allied ships. Before their torpedoes could be fired however, they were met with a salvo of gunfire from the United Nations ships which destroyed three of the torpedo boats. The surviving North Korean craft fled. Later in July, Juneau encountered the same ammunition ships and destroyed them.

== "Sinking" USS Baltimore ==
The Victorious War Museum in Pyongyang, North Korea has several exhibits which claim that the USS Baltimore (CA-68) was sunk by motor torpedo boats belonging to the Korean People's Navy, under the command of Kim Kun Ok. Exhibits include a poster and the "actual" boat which supposedly sank the American cruiser. However, the Baltimore was in the United States Navy’s decommissioned reserve from 1946 to 1951 and mothballed in Bremerton, Washington, therefore she did not participate in any battles anywhere in 1950. In 1951, the Baltimore was recommissioned and assigned to the Atlantic (not Pacific) Fleet, and in 1955, she was transferred to the Pacific Fleet, two years after the end of the Korean War. She was struck from the Navy list on 15 February 1971, sold on 10 April 1972 to the Zidell Ship Dismantling Company of Portland, Oregon, and subsequently scrapped in September 1972.
