= Sinpo-class submarine =

North Korean submarine

Sinpo-B class
Class overview
- Builders: Sinpo South Shipyard
- Operators: Korean People's Navy
- Preceded by: Sang-O class
- Succeeded by: Sinpo-C-class submarine
- Planned: 3 or more
- Building: 1
- Completed: 1
- Active: 1

General characteristics
- Type: Diesel submarine
- Displacement: Submerged 1,650-2,000 tons
- Length: 70 m (229 ft 8 in) (estimated); 65 m (213 ft 3 in) (lwl estimated)
- Beam: 7 m (23 ft 0 in) (estimated)
- Propulsion: Diesel-electric (?)
- Speed: (estimated) 16 knots (30 km/h; 18 mph) on surface; 10 knots (19 km/h) dived. (estimated)
- Range: 1,500 nmi (2,800 km; 1,700 mi) (estimated)
- Complement: 70–80 (estimated)
- Crew: 30–50 (estimated)
- Armament: Pukguksong-1 (KN-11); Sinpo-C: 3 × Pukguksong-3; Hero Kim Kun Ok: 10 × Pukguksong-3 or; 4 × Pukguksong-3 and 6 × smaller SLBM

The Sinpo-class submarine (Korean: 신포급 잠수함), also called the Gorae class (고래급; lit. whale) or Pongdae class (봉대급), (Note: Named for the Pongdae Boiler Plant, a cover term for the Sinpo South Shipyard.) is a new class of submarine produced in North Korea. Only one submarine has been observed in service, the 8.24 Yongung. It is the largest submarine designed and built for the Korean People's Navy.

== Design and features ==
The design may be influenced by older Yugoslav designs such as Heroj and Sava. There has been speculation the design is influenced by modern Russian submarines of the Kilo-class, or Golf-class submarines, but the submarine is significantly smaller than these designs.

If the design is successful, the Sinpo class could replace the aging Romeo-class submarines. However, it is possibly a one-off experimental submarine as the Korean People's Navy has built previously.

=== Armaments ===
Satellite images suggest the presence of an opening on the conning tower indicating the presence of a launch tube for one or two missiles.

In August 2016, during the annual joint US-South Korea military exercise, a submarine presumed to be this one launched what is believed to be a Pukguksong-1 (KN-11) ballistic missile into the Sea of Japan. North Korea's first released pictures of the submarine associated it with the test of the KN-11 missile.

== 8.24 Yongung ==
The only submarine of this class is named 8.24 Yongung ("August 24 Hero"), with pennant number 824, named after the DPRK's first successfully launched submarine-launched ballistic missile (SLBM) from a submarine on 24 August 2016.

On 19 October 2021, the 8.24 Yongung conducted a launch of an SLBM apparently based on the Hwasong-11A (KN-23), later identified as Hwasong-11S. On 14 March 2023, two cruise missiles were fired as part of a launching drill.

As of May 2025, the 8.24 Yongung is docked alongside the Hero Kim Kun Ok at Sinpo South Shipyard.

== Variants ==
=== Sinpo-C ===
In September 2016, analysts at 38 North reported on a 10-metre (32 ft 10 in) diameter object detected on satellite images of North Korea's Sinpo South Shipyard, believing the object may be a construction jig or possibly a pressure hull of a new submarine.

US intelligence detected a new submarine being built at Sinpo which was considered a likely successor to Sinpo-B (Gorae) and labelled it Sinpo-C with an estimated submerged displacement of over 2,000 tons and with an 11-metre (36 ft 1 in) beam. 38 North also detected signs of submarine being built and reported satellite imagery from 5 November 2017 indicates a diameter of 7.1 metres (23 ft 4 in).

Tokyo Shimbun reported in September 2017, that new North Korean submarine in construction to displace 3,000 tons and have air-independent propulsion. Also in September 2017, Sekai Nippo also reported on the 3,000-ton submarine and added it is nuclear powered.

The Sinpo-C ballistic missile submarine (SSB) and the Sinpo-class experimental ballistic missile submarine (SSBA) were built in the Sinpo South shipyard.

Chosun Ilbo reported on 5 April 2019 that a 3,000-ton ballistic missile submarine was being built at Sinpo. Satellite images of the Sinpo shipyard from March and April 2019 indicated that submarine construction was still ongoing.

As September 2023, there was one submarine of the class, Hero Kim Kun Ok, which was named after the supposed commander of KPA naval forces in the 1950 engagement they call the battle of Chumonchin Chan.

=== 3,000-ton submarine and 4,000–5,000-ton submarine ===
South Korean media has suggested that North Korea managed to reverse-engineer or modify one of the old Golf-II hulls that North Korea imported in the early 1990s. However, an analysis in 38 North disagrees with the Golf-II conversion theory, as such a hull has yet to be identified.

Although a Type 033 submarine is the submarine being converted at the Sinpo South Shipyard, such a submarine, which originally displaced 1,830 tons is unlikely to become a 3,000-ton submarine, by adding missile launch tubes and expanding the sail, as images released do not show the submarine being expanded in length. A Golf-class submarine, however, would fit the description of a 3,000 ton submarine, which is significantly larger than the Type 033 submarine that is the only known submarine undergoing reconstruction.

On 6 September 2023, the submarine named Hero Kim Kun Ok was unveiled via KCNA on 8 September 2023 as a modified Romeo-class submarine. Originally having three missile tubes during construction, when completed the submarine possessed a larger missile compartment behind the sail with ten vertical launch tubes laid out in two rows of five; the front four being larger to house SLBMs like the Pukguksong-1, Pukguksong-3, and Hwasong-11S, and the remaining smaller six housing Hwasal-2 submarine-launched cruise missiles. Kim Jong Un stated that it is intended for North Korea's entire fleet of 20 Romeo-class submarines to be converted into missile submarines, but it is unknown how many are viable to be upgraded or how long it might take.

A different South Korean report claims that North Korea is also developing a larger submarine, at around 4,000 to 5,000 tons. This particular weight would fit the category of a nuclear submarine, which had been a stated goal by Kim Jong Un at the 8th Congress of the Workers' Party of Korea.
