= Sinpo =

Sinpo 신포시
- Municipal City

Korean transcription(s)
  - Chosŏn'gŭl: 신포시
  - Hancha: 新浦市
  - McCune-Reischauer: Sinp'o si
  - Revised Romanization: Sinpo-si
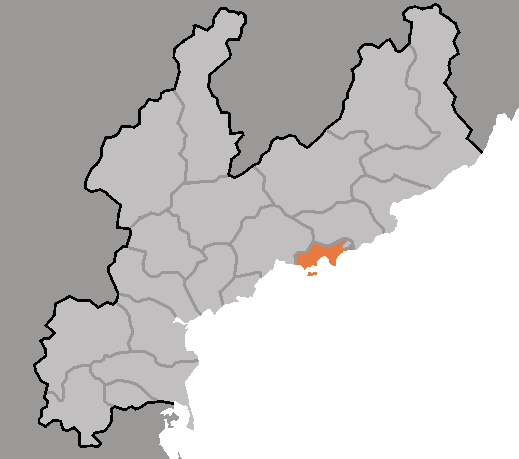
- Map of South Hamgyong showing the location of Sinpo

- Map of North Korea showing the location of Sinpo
- Coordinates: 40°02′5″N 128°11′8″E
- Country: North Korea
- Province: South Hamgyong Province
- Administrative divisions: 16 tong, 6 ri

Population (2008)
  - Total: 152,759
  - Dialect: Hamgyŏng
- Time zone: UTC+9 (Pyongyang Time)

Sinpo (Note: Officially called Sinpho.) (Korean pronunciation: [ɕin.pʰo]) is a port city on the coast of the Sea of Japan in central South Hamgyŏng province, North Korea. According to the last available census, approximately 152,759 people reside there.

== Administrative divisions ==
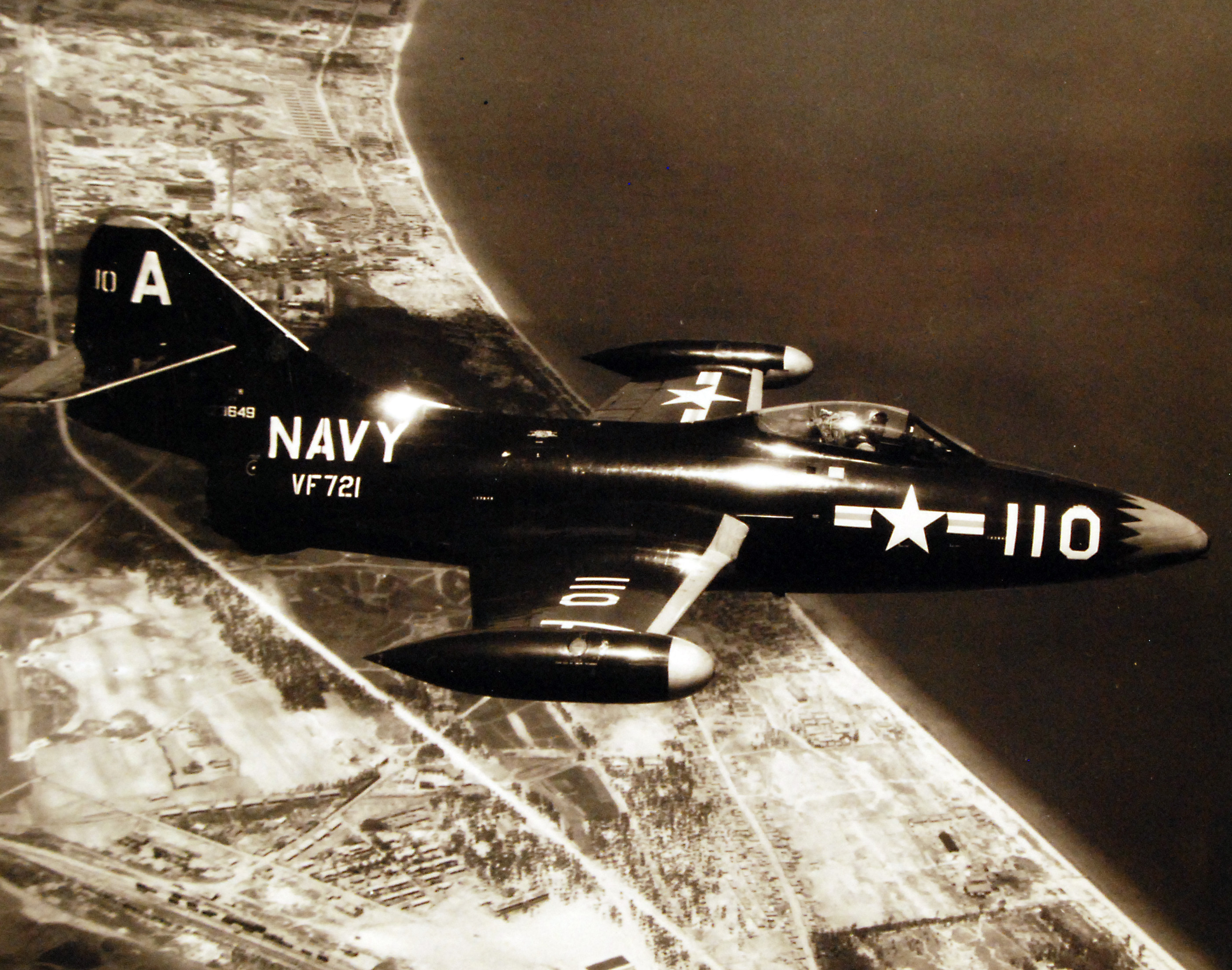
American F9F Panther flying near Sinpo during the Korean War

Sinp'o is divided into 16 tong (neighbourhoods) and 6 ri (villages):

- Haeam 1-dong
- Haeam 2-dong
- Haesan-dong
- Kwangbok 1-dong
- Kwangbok 2-dong
- Mayang-dong
- Ŏhang-dong
- P'ung'ŏ-dong
- Ryŏnho-dong
- Ryuktae 1-dong
- Ryuktae 2-dong
- Sinhŭng-dong
- Tongho 1-dong
- Tongho 2-dong
- Yangji-dong
- Poju-ri
- Puch'ang-ri
- Ryongjung-ri
- Sinho-ri
- Sinp'ung-ri
- Yanghwa-ri

== Economy ==
=== Fishery ===
It is an important base for fishing, with a recent government emphasis on aquaculture. The DPRK has created aquacultural cooperatives and a central aquaculture office in the city.

Sinpo is the place where Kim Jong Un opened North Korea's first offshore farm in December 2024.

=== Nuclear power ===
==== 1980s ====
In 1985 or 1986, the Soviet Union announced it would build a nuclear power plant, in an effort to persuade North Korea to join the International Atomic Energy Agency. According to South Korean sources, the plant was to be located in the Sinpo District, and construction began in 1990, but later ended due to pressure from IAEA, and economic difficulties in the Soviet Union.

==== 1990s ====
In the 1990s, the Kumho area of Sinpo was the site of two planned reactors which were to have been built by the Korean Peninsula Energy Development Organization (KEDO) with international support. The project was later cancelled by the United States in 2002, amidst claims of a breach in a 1994 agreement on North Korea's nuclear weapons programs.

Preparation work on the site began in 1996, and a groundbreaking ceremony took place in 1997, with construction originally expected to be completed in 2003. Workers were removed from the area in January 2006, and the project was officially terminated in May that same year.

== Military ==
Sinpo is a major hub of the defense industry of North Korea, and the Sinpo South Shipyard, its shipyards, have produced the Sinpo-class submarine, and is adjacent to the Mayang-Do Naval Base and a land-based SLBM launch platform. Also, the SINPO-C ballistic missile submarine (SSB) and the SINPO-class experimental ballistic missile submarine (SSBA) were built in the shipyard.

== Notable events ==
Sinp'o is reportedly close to the site of a severe railroad accident in 1995, with over 700 civilians killed. Those who died were passengers from the lower classes, packed into standing-room only cars. The survivors, mostly party elites and their relatives, were in safer cars at the front of the train.

== Transport ==
Sinp'o Station is on the P'yŏngra Line of the Korean State Railway.

== Climate ==
Sinpo has a humid continental climate (Köppen climate classification: Dwa).

Climate data for Sinpo (1991–2020)
Month	Jan	Feb	Mar	Apr	May	Jun	Jul	Aug	Sep	Oct	Nov	Dec	Year
Mean daily maximum °C (°F)	2.6 (36.7)	3.9 (39.0)	8.4 (47.1)	14.5 (58.1)	19.0 (66.2)	22.3 (72.1)	25.6 (78.1)	26.9 (80.4)	23.6 (74.5)	18.4 (65.1)	11.1 (52.0)	4.7 (40.5)	15.1 (59.2)
Daily mean °C (°F)	−2.6 (27.3)	−0.8 (30.6)	3.7 (38.7)	9.3 (48.7)	14.0 (57.2)	18.3 (64.9)	22.1 (71.8)	23.1 (73.6)	19.1 (66.4)	13.1 (55.6)	5.8 (42.4)	−0.4 (31.3)	10.4 (50.7)
Mean daily minimum °C (°F)	−7.2 (19.0)	−5.5 (22.1)	−0.6 (30.9)	4.7 (40.5)	9.9 (49.8)	15.2 (59.4)	19.4 (66.9)	20.1 (68.2)	14.9 (58.8)	8.1 (46.6)	1.3 (34.3)	−4.8 (23.4)	6.3 (43.3)
Average precipitation mm (inches)	18.2 (0.72)	14.2 (0.56)	17.0 (0.67)	33.7 (1.33)	61.3 (2.41)	58.3 (2.30)	152.3 (6.00)	123.8 (4.87)	86.2 (3.39)	39.9 (1.57)	37.6 (1.48)	15.8 (0.62)	658.3 (25.92)
Average precipitation days (≥ 0.1 mm)	4.8	3.4	4.4	4.7	6.6	6.9	10.0	9.4	6.1	4.4	5.1	3.9	69.7
Average snowy days	6.8	5.6	4.6	0.5	0.0	0.0	0.0	0.0	0.0	0.0	1.5	4.9	23.9
Average relative humidity (%)	67.7	66.4	67.2	68.2	74.7	82.0	85.6	84.3	78.2	71.9	68.4	65.4	73.3
Source: Korea Meteorological Administration

== See also ==
- South Hamgyong
- Administrative divisions of North Korea
- Geography of North Korea
