= Posan station =

Railway station in North Korea

Posan 보산

Korean name
- Hangul: 보산역
- Hanja: 保山驛
- Revised Romanization: Bosan-nyeok
- McCune–Reischauer: Posan-nyŏk

General information
- Location: Posan-dong, Ch'ŏllima-guyŏk, Namp'o; North Korea
- Owner: Korean State Railway
- Tracks: 4

Services
Preceding station	Korean State Railway	Following station
Kangsŏ Terminus	Posan Line	Terminus
Location

Posan station is a freight-only railway station in Posan-dong, Ch'ŏllima-guyŏk, Namp'o Special City, North Korea. It is the terminus of the Posan Line from Kangsŏ on the P'yŏngnam Line of the Korean State Railway.

== Services ==
The primary function of this station is to provide rail service, via several sidings, to the April 13 Ironworks, which produces pig iron; all of the output is shipped to the Ch'ŏllima Steel Complex a short distance away at Kangsŏn on the P'yŏngnam Line, whilst using raw materials received from all over the western part of the country.
