= Pyongnam Taean station =

Railway station in North Korea

P'yŏngnam Taean 평남대안

Korean name
- Hangul: 평남대안역
- Hanja: 平南大安驛
- Revised Romanization: Pyeongnam Daean-yeok
- McCune–Reischauer: P'yŏngnam Taean-yŏk

General information
- Location: Ŭndŏk-tong, Taean-guyŏk, Namp'o-t'ŭkpyŏlsi; North Korea
- Owner: Korean State Railway
- Platforms: 2
- Tracks: 2

History
- Original company: Chosen Government Railway

Services
Preceding station	Korean State Railway	Following station
Kangsŏ Terminus	Taean Line	Taean Hwamul Terminus
Location

P'yŏngnam Taean station is a railway station located in Ŭndŏk-tong, Taean-guyŏk, Namp'o-t'ŭkpyŏlsi, North Korea, on the Taean Line of the Korean State Railway.

== History ==
The station was originally opened by the Chosen Government Railway.
