= Posan Line =

Railway line in North Korea

Overview
- Native name: 보산선 (保山線)
- Status: Operational
- Owner: Korean State Railway
- Locale: South P'yŏngan
- Termini: Kangso; Posan
- Stations: 2

Service
- Type: Heavy rail, Freight rail
- Operator: Korean State Railway

Technical
- Line length: 6.8 km (4.2 mi)
- Number of tracks: Single track
- Track gauge: 1,435 mm (4 ft 8 1/2 in) standard gauge
- Electrification: 3000 V DC Catenary

- Posan Line
- Hangul: 보산선
- Hanja: 保山線
- RR: Bosanseon
- MR: Posansŏn

The Posan Line is an electrified freight-only railway line of the Korean State Railway in South P'yŏngan Province, North Korea from Kangsŏ at the junction of the P'yŏngnam and Taean Lines, to Posan.

== Services ==
The April 13 Ironworks at Posan produces pig iron, all of which is shipped to the Ch'ŏllima Steel Complex a short distance away at Kangsŏn on the P'yŏngnam Line, whilst using raw materials received from all over the western part of the country.

== Route ==
A yellow background in the "Distance" box indicates that section of the line is not electrified.

Distance (km)		Station Name		Former Name		
Total	S2S	Transcribed	Chosŏn'gŭl (Hanja)	Transcribed	Chosŏn'gŭl (Hanja)	Connections
0.0	0.0	Kangsŏ	강서 (江西)	Kiyang	기양 (岐陽)	Taean Line, P'yŏngnam Line
5.0	5.0	Posan	보산 (保山)			
