= April 13 Ironworks =

- Chosŏn'gŭl: 4월13일제철소
- Hancha: 四月十三日製鐵所
- Revised Romanization: 4-wol 13-il Jecheolso
- McCune–Reischauer: 4-wŏl 13-il Chech'ŏlso

The April 13 Ironworks, one of North Korea's primary metal industries, is an ironworks in Posan-dong, Ch'ŏllima-guyŏk, Namp'o. Originally opened during the Japanese colonial era, it was nationalised after the partition of Korea and has been renovated several times, in the 1960s and again in the 1980s. As of 1997 it has a production capacity of hundreds of thousands of tons of pig iron, of which all is shipped to the Ch'ŏllima Steel Complex in nearby Kangsŏn.

The facility is served by the Korean State Railway via Posan Station on the P'yŏngnam Line.
