= Kangso station =

Railway station in Kangso, North Korea

Kangsŏ 강서

Korean name
- Hangul: 강서역
- Hanja: 江西驛
- Revised Romanization: Gangseo-yeok
- McCune–Reischauer: Kangsŏ-yŏk

General information
- Location: Ch'ŏn-dong, Kangsŏ-guyŏk, Namp'o-tŭkpyŏlsi; North Korea
- Coordinates: 38.9172°N 125.5214°E
- Owner: Korean State Railway
- Platforms: 3 (1 island)
- Tracks: 4

History
- Opened: 16 October 1910
- Former names: Kiyang station Chosŏn'gŭl: 기양역; Hanja: 岐陽駅
- Original company: Chosen Government Railway

Services
Preceding station	Korean State Railway	Following station
Kangsŏn towards P'yŏngyang	P'yŏngnam Line	Ryonggang towards Namp'o
Terminus	Taean Line	P'yŏngnam Taean towards Taean Hwamul
Terminus	Posan Line	Posan Terminus
Location

Kangsŏ station is a railway station in Kiyang-dong, Kangsŏ-guyŏk, Namp'o Special City, North Korea, on the P'yŏngnam Line of the Korean State Railway. It is the starting point of the Taean Line and of the Posan Line.

== History ==
Originally called Kiyang station, it was opened by the Chosen Government Railway, along with the rest of the mainline of the P'yŏngnam Line, on 16 October 1910.

== Services ==
=== Freight ===
Amongst other industries, the Kŭmsŏng Tractor Factory is served via a spur from this station.

=== Passenger ===
Kangsŏ station is an important and busy station for passenger services. According to the 2002 timetable of passenger trains, the following long-distances trains stopped here:

- Semi-express trains 146-147/148-149 (Sinŭiju−P'yŏngyang−Namp'o), departing Kangsŏ at 15:12 for Namp'o and at 18:37 for Sinŭiju;
- Regional trains 226-227/228-229 (Tŏkch'ŏn−P'yŏngyang−P'yŏngnam Onch'ŏn), departing Kangsŏ at 23:32 for Onch'ŏn and at 00:22 for Tŏkch'ŏn;
- Regional trains 225/230 (P'yŏngyang-Pot'onggang station−P'yŏngnam Onch'ŏn), departing Kangsŏ at 16:24 for Onch'ŏn and at 08:16 for Pot'onggang;
- Regional trains 240-241/242-243 (Haeju−P'yŏngyang−Namp'o), departing Kangsŏ at 06:50 for Namp'o and at 09:54 for Haeju;
- Local trains 733/734 (Kangsŏ−Ryonggang-Mayŏng), departing 08:05 for Mayŏng, with the return trip arriving at 14:40.
