= Taean Hwamul station =

Freight-only railway station in Nampo, North Korea

Taean Hwamul 대안화물

Korean name
- Hangul: 대안화물역
- Hanja: 大安貨物驛
- Revised Romanization: Daean Hwamul-yeok
- McCune–Reischauer: Taean Hwamul-yŏk

General information
- Location: Sep'o-ri, Taean-guyŏk, Namp'o-t'ŭkpyŏlsi; North Korea
- Owner: Korean State Railway
- Tracks: 3

History
- Original company: Chosen Government Railway

Services
| Preceding station | Korean State Railway | Following station |
|---|---|---|
| P'yŏngnam Taean towards Kangsŏ | Taean Line | Terminus |

Taean Hwamul station is a freight-only railway station located in Sep'o-ri, Taean-guyŏk, Namp'o-t'ŭkpyŏlsi, North Korea; it is the terminus station of the Taean Line of the Korean State Railway.

The station spur tracks serving the Taean Machine Complex, the Taean Electric Factory, and the Taean Friendship Glass Factory.

== History ==
The station was originally opened by the Chosen Government Railway.
