= Taean Heavy Machine Complex =

Machinery factory in Taean-dong, Taean-guyŏk, Namp'o Special City, North Korea

Coordinates: 38°49′52″N 125°30′53″E

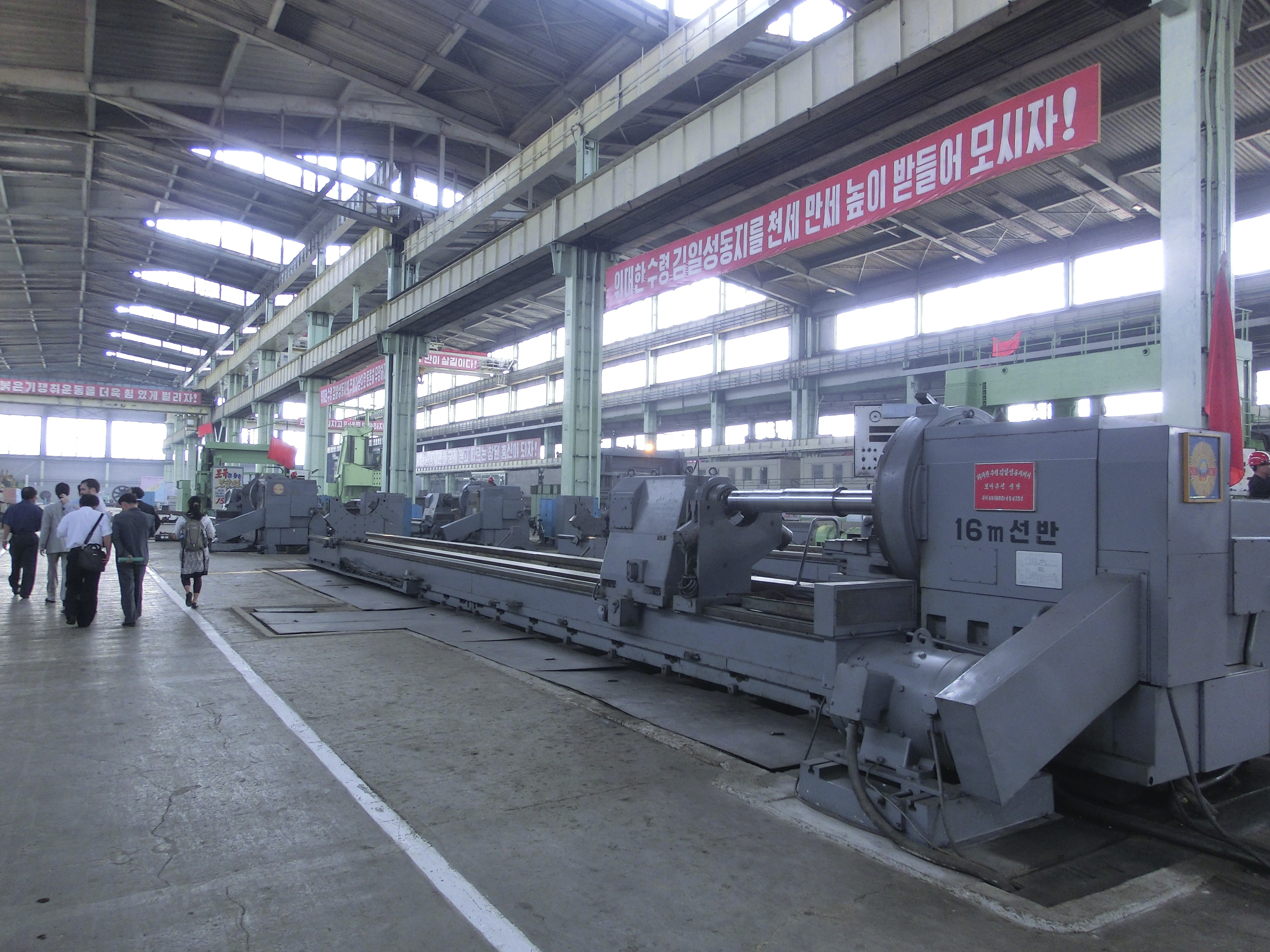

Korean name
- Chosŏn'gŭl: 대안중기계련합기업소
- Hancha: 大安重機械聯合企業所
- Revised Romanization: Daean Junggigye Yeonghap Kieopso
- McCune–Reischauer: Taean Chunggigye Ryŏnghap Kiŏpso

The Taean Machine Complex is machinery factory in Taean-dong, Taean-guyŏk, Namp'o Special City, North Korea producing a wide array of electric machinery for industrial and household use.

Products include electric motors, transformers, power generation equipment such as hydro and thermal power generators, machinery for use in metallurgical and chemical factories, coal mining equipment, etc. Employing approximately 14,000 workers, the complex can produce up to 1,000 electric motors of 75 kW (101 hp) to 320 kW (430 hp), 100-200 560kWA ~ 125,000VA transformers and 100 hydraulic turbine generators of 300 kW (400 hp) to 125,000 kW (168,000 hp) annually.

== History ==
Only a small iron workshop prior to World War II, it was nationalised in November 1945, becoming a branch facility of the Kangsŏn Steel Works producing small farm equipment. Production of 3.75 kW (5.03 hp) electric motors and 10kVA transformers began in 1948. Later, production of motors and pumps for rural irrigation began. In October 1975 it became an integrated machinery factory, and on 25 September 1980 the Taean Electric Factory and the Taean Machinery Factory were merged to form the current Taean Machine Complex. The complex was awarded the Order of Kim Il-sung, and was twice awarded the "Ch'ŏllima Factory" award.

The Taean Machine Complex was heavily involved in projects such as the West Sea Barrage, the Sunch'ŏn Vinylon Complex, the Sariwon Fertiliser Complex, the coal gas plants at the Namhŭng Youth Chemical Complex, the Samsu Power Plant, the Ŏrangch'ŏn Power Plant, the Wŏnsan Ch'ŏngnyŏn Power Plant, the Anbyŏn Ch'ŏngnyŏn Power Plant, the Ryesŏng River Power Plant, the Naep'yŏng Power Plant, the Namgang Power Plant, the Hŭngju Ch'ŏngnyŏn Power Plant the December Thermal Power Plant, the Tongp'yŏng Thermal Power Plant, the T'aech'ŏn Nuclear Power Plant, and the T'aechŏn Hydroelectric Power Plant.

== Description ==
The Taean Machine Complex is made up of a central primary facility and subordinate facilities. The central facility consists of the primary manufacturing plant with facilities for production of electromechanical machinery, insulating materials, building materials, household goods and sewing equipment. The secondary facilities include the first and second processing workshops, and facilities for the production of metal cutting equipment, large generators and turbines, large gears and other similar equipment. The electromechanical machinery facility manufactures electric machinery required for power generation facilities, along with other workshops for the production of electric motors, transformers and other electric machinery, while the insulating material facility produces insulation needed in transformers and electric motors. Other workshops manufacture household items such as fans, universal transformers and sewing machines. There are also facilities for the production of glass fibre and insulation for use with molten steel, along with subsidiaries such as the Yonggang Motor Factory and the T'aesŏng Electric Factory. Other entities forming part of the complex are an insulation research institute, an industrial test centre, an automation design workshop, along with the Taean Industrial College, an electrical engineering college, a design college and a school for related trades.

The facility is served by the Korean State Railway via Taean Freight Station on the Taean Line.

== Four brother factories ==
According to North Korean media, along with Kumsong Tractor Factory, Chollima Steel Complex and Taean Friendship Glass Factory, the factory is a member of the "four brother factories(네형제공장, Nehyongjegongjang)" and is reported to engage in "Socialist competitions" between the companies that are held every year in the country.
