= North Korean defectors in Thailand =

Key destination for refugees

Thailand has become one of the destinations of choice for North Korean defectors aiming to either resettle in third countries, or pass in transit to South Korea. Although the Royal Thai Government does not recognize North Korean escapees as refugees, but rather as illegal economic migrants, the Thai government allows North Koreans illegally entering the country to resettle in South Korea. This is possible because South Korea’s domestic law recognizes that North Koreans are also citizens of South Korea. The Thai government also cites the "conveniently blurred geographical distinctions" between the two Koreas in facilitating the transfer and resettlement process.

== Migration trend ==
Despite the long distance between North Korea and Thailand, this escape route became significantly more popular for North Korean defectors between 2004 and 2011. The number of North Koreans who escaped through Thailand in 2004 was 46. The figure increased to 752 in 2005, 1,785 in 2007, 1,849 in 2009, and 2,482 in 2010. In 2011, 95 percent of North Koreans arriving in South Korea were reportedly sent from Thailand. However, the Thai government has stopped providing the official figures for the recent years. It is estimated that there are approximately 10-15 defectors from North Korea entering Thailand every week.

== The journey ==
Most North Korean refugees use a route that runs from China to Laos, then to Thailand. The old routes which run from Mongolia to China, to Vietnam and Myanmar have become less preferable due to the recent stricter border control of these countries. The escapees also face a greater chance of being handed over to the North Korean authorities in these countries, which will later deport them back to North Korea.

The journey usually begins by the crossing of the Tumen River into China. Once in China, the escapees seek to go by bus or foot to reach the south of China. Some refugees have reportedly chosen the so-called "Golden Triangle route, the area where Myanmar, Laos and Thailand converge. The majority of refugees prefer the Laos-Thailand route. Escapees then have to cross the Mekong River, which is the main river border between Laos and Thailand.

North Korean defectors typically enter the north and north-eastern provinces in Thailand after having crossed the Mekong River. Along the journey, the refugees take considerable risks due to the chances of being arrested and deported to North Korea to be further punished. Some escapees pay brokers as high as $3,000 to be smuggled into the country. South Korean brokers are assumed to play an important role in smuggling processes. In case that the defectors are sponsored by their family abroad, they can spend a short time in China before entering Thailand to be resettled. However, the defectors face numbers of risks, and are often subject to exploitation. Some have to remain in China to repay their debts. Many women are forced into prostitution. Many men find themselves working in hard labor. Some are kidnapped along the way by human traffickers, and/or forced to pay fees to be able to pass through the border.

A North Korean refugee from the immigration detention center in Bangkok said that many escapees have preferred Thailand because recently there have been stricter border patrols in Myanmar, Laos and China. Also, it is assumed that the word-of-mouth communication, spreading among those who have been successfully resettled to South Korea and managed to find their ways to communicate with their relatives in North Korea, is one of the main factors contributing to the increasing inflow of the North Korean defectors in Thailand over the past decade.

== Government reaction ==
The Thai government and the South Korean government appeared reluctant to release official announcement regarding the issue, as it could have negative impacts on the states’ relations among the three countries. However, a confidential US diplomatic cable released by Wikileaks indicates that the two governments have reached an agreement on the resettlement of the North Korean defectors to South Korea. The special policy is publicly presented by the Thai government as deporting native Koreans back to South Korea.

The Thai government appeared sensitive regarding its mistreatment of North Korean refugees and the government’s position in facilitating the transferring process. In 2006, the Thai government already drew international attention for carrying out a military coup. More focus was given in 2007, when over four hundred North Koreans asylum seekers went on hunger strike at the detention center in Bangkok. The UNHCR urged that the Thai government address the problem regarding the living conditions of the asylum seekers. Consequently, there was a confidential negotiation between Thai government and the South Korean government, which put an end to the hunger strike. Both governments; however, did not provide details concerning the concluded agreement. The South Korean government claimed that disclosing the details could potentially provoke the North Korean government into imposing stricter control over their citizens.

== Resettlement ==
Most escapees that arrive in Thailand’s territory are usually willing to turn themselves in to the police. Some may also go as far as to commit petty crimes in order to be arrested. Some refugees seek to travel directly from the border to Bangkok, as they hope for spending shorter time in the detention centre, and for faster resettlement processes. After being arrested, the North Korean refugees are temporarily detained by the Thai police. Then they will be prosecuted for their illegal entry and charged a small penalty fine. They will be relocated to the Immigration Detention Centre (IDC) in Bangkok afterwards, and held until the third-country resettlement process is finished. The resettlement allows the refugees to travel to the third country of destination. Nearly 95 percent of the North Korean refugees in Thailand seek to be resettled in South Korea.

After arriving in South Korea, the defectors are provided with assistance in resettling in the country. According to Daniel Pinkston, the deputy project director of Northeast Asia program for the International Crisis Group (ICG), the refugees are entitled to attend a 12-week course on how to integrate into South Korean society. The program includes lessons on welfare accession, public transportation, education, etc. The government also provides the refugees with cash and accommodation, while NGOs provide additional supports in resettlement, job finding, and school attendance.

== See also ==
- North Korea–Thailand relations
- South Korea–Thailand relations
- Thailand–United States relations
