= Chamjilli station =

Railway station in North Korea

Chamjilli 잠진리

Korean name
- Hangul: 잠진리역
- Hanja: 箴津里驛
- Revised Romanization: Jamjilli-yeok
- McCune–Reischauer: Chamjilli-yŏk

General information
- Location: Chamjilli, Kangsŏ-guyŏk, Namp'o-tŭkpyŏlsi; North Korea
- Owner: Korean State Railway
- Tracks: 2

Services
Preceding station	Korean State Railway	Following station
Terminus	Chamjilli Line	Kangsŏn Terminus

Chamjilli station is a railway station in Chamjil-li, Kangsŏ-guyŏk, Namp'o Special City, North Korea. It is the terminus of a branchline from Kangsŏn on the P'yŏngnam Line of the Korean State Railway.

At Chamjilli, there are spurs serving a number of industries above ground, as well as a spur leading underground into the Namp'o Kangsŏ Missile Factory's underground facility.
