= Nampo Kangso Missile Factory =

- Chosŏn'gŭl: 남포시강서구역미싸일공장
- Revised Romanization: Nampo-si Gangso-guyeok Misail Gongjang
- McCune–Reischauer: Namp'o-si Kangsŏ-guyŏk Missail Kongjang

The Namp'o Kangsŏ Missile Factory (North Korean 남포시강서구역미싸일공장, South Korean 남포시강서구역미사일공장) is a factory reportedly manufacturing the Scud and Taepodong-2 ballistic missiles, located in Kangsŏ-guyŏk, Namp'o, North Korea The factory is located partially above ground and partially underground and is rail-served, with a spur entering the underground facility from the Chamjilli railway station on the P'yŏngnam Line of the Korean State Railway. The plant has reportedly produced up to 200 Scud missiles annually, using electronic components based on Japanese designs manufactured at the P'yŏngyang Semiconductor Factory.
