= Kangson station =

Railway station in North Korea

Kangsŏn 강선

Korean name
- Hangul: 강선역
- Hanja: 降仙驛
- Revised Romanization: Gangseon-yeok
- McCune–Reischauer: Kangsŏn-yŏk

General information
- Location: Kangch'ŏl-dong, Ch'ŏllima-guyŏk, Namp'o-tŭkpyŏlsi; North Korea
- Coordinates: 38.9295°N 125.5778°E
- Owner: Korean State Railway
- Platforms: 3 (1 island)
- Tracks: 8

History
- Opened: 1 July 1923
- Original company: Chosen Government Railway

Services
Preceding station	Korean State Railway	Following station
Taep'yŏng towards P'yŏngyang	P'yŏngnam Line	Kangsŏ towards Namp'o
Chamjilli Terminus	Chamjilli Line	Terminus
Location

Kangsŏn station is a major railway station used by passenger and freight trains in Kangch'ŏl-dong, Ch'ŏllima-guyŏk, Namp'o Special City, North Korea, on the P'yŏngnam Line of the Korean State Railway. It is also the starting point of the freight-only Chamjilli Line.

== History ==
The station was opened on 1 July 1923 by the Chosen Government Railway. The Ch'ŏllima Steel Complex just to the south of the station, one of the DPRK's largest steel mills, is served by this station via an extensive network of trackage on the factory grounds.

== See also ==
- Kangson enrichment site
- Chollima Steel Complex
