= Kumsong Tractor Factory =

North Korean manufacturing company

- Chosŏn'gŭl: 금성뜨락또르종합공장
- Hancha: 金星뜨락또르総合工場
- Revised Romanization: Geumseong Tteurakttoreu Jonghap Gongjang
- McCune–Reischauer: Kŭmsŏng Ttŭrakttorŭ Chonghap Kongjang

The Kŭmsŏng Tractor Factory, located in Kiyang-dong, Kangsŏ-guyŏk, Namp'o, is North Korea's largest manufacturer of tractors, bulldozers, and other agricultural equipment. Employing around 10,000 workers, the factory has a floor area of 142,000 m^{2} (1,530,000 sq ft) on a total area of 400,000 m^{2} (4,300,000 sq ft). Peak production capacity is 10,000 tractors per year. The factory's current product is the Chollima-804Ka tractor. Claims have been made this factory also produces TEL mobile missile platforms.

The facility is served by the Korean State Railway via Kangsŏ Station on the P'yŏngnam Line.

== Four brother factories ==
According to North Korean media, along with Taean Heavy Machine Complex, Chollima Steel Complex and Taean Friendship Glass Factory, the factory is a member of the "four brother factories(네형제공장, Nehyongjegongjang)" and is reported to engage in "Socialist competitions" between the companies that are held every year in the country.

== History ==
The plant was opened in 1954, rebuilt from the ruins of a chemical fertiliser plant destroyed during the Korean War, producing various agricultural implements. The first tractor, the 'Ch'ŏllima 28, entered production in 1958. The prototype of this tractor, which was reverse engineered from a Soviet design, was built up in forty days. Production capacity was expanded significantly in the following years; between 1970 and 1978, output increased 8.7 times, and by 1979, only 30% of production was of the 28-horsepower model, with the other 70% being accounted for by the 75-hp P'ungnyŏn model. Automation is also extensive; for example, the process of making the gearbox and the engine blocks are each overseen by a single person. Both Kim Il Sung and Kim Jong Il visited the factory numerous times to offer on-the-spot guidance; there is a large monument commemorating the first of Kim Il Sung's visits.

On 26 July 1973, a large new expansion of the factory was opened, and it was renamed from Kiyang Tractor Factory to Kumsong Tractor Factory, with Kim Il Sung in attendance. The new factory featured automated machinery for both the Pungnyon bulldozer and the Chollima tractors.

In 2017, the factory started producing the new 80-hp Ch'ŏllima 804 tractor model.
