= Chamjilli Line =

Railway line in North Korea

Overview
- Native name: 잠진리선 (箴津里線)
- Status: Operational
- Owner: Korean State Railway
- Locale: South P'yŏngan
- Termini: Kangsŏn; Chamjilli
- Stations: 2

Service
- Type: Heavy rail, Freight rail
- Operator: Korean State Railway

Technical
- Number of tracks: Single track
- Track gauge: 1,435 mm (4 ft 8 1/2 in) standard gauge

- Chamjilli Line
- Hangul: 잠진리선
- Hanja: 箴津里線
- RR: Jamjilliseon
- MR: Chamjillisŏn

The Chamjilli Line is a non-electrified freight-only railway line of the Korean State Railway in South P'yŏngan Province, North Korea from Kangsŏn on the P'yŏngnam Line to Chamjilli.

== Services ==
The line serves several above-ground factories and the Namp'o Kangsŏ Missile Factory, which is an underground facility with a rail spur entering the underground complex. In the past there was also a section leading to another (now closed) factory, and to the Kangsŏ Colliery.

== Route ==
A yellow background in the "Distance" box indicates that section of the line is not electrified.

Distance (km)		Station Name		Former Name		
Total	S2S	Transcribed	Chosŏn'gŭl (Hanja)	Transcribed	Chosŏn'gŭl (Hanja)	Connections
0.0	0.0	Kangsŏn (Ch'ŏllima)	강선 (降仙) (천리마 (千里馬))			P'yŏngnam Line
~~9.7~~	~~9.7~~	Chamjilli	잠진리 (箴津里)			Closed (Kangsŏn Colliery)
