= Taean Friendship Glass Factory =

North Korean glass manufacturer

- Chosŏn'gŭl: 대안친선유리공장
- Hancha: 大安親善瑠璃工場
- Revised Romanization: Daean Chinseon Yuri Gongjang
- McCune–Reischauer: Taean Ch'insŏn Yuri Kongjang

The Taean Friendship Glass Factory, located in Taean-guyŏk, Namp'o, North Korea, is a factory producing plate glass and other glass products.

The factory, completed in 2005 with funding from the Chinese government, has a floor area of 158,000 m^{2} (1,700,000 sq ft) on a total area of 293,000 m^{2} (3,150,000 sq ft), and has both a pier and a railway connection. Most raw materials, such as sand, feldspar, sodium carbonate and dolomite, arrive by ship via the factory's pier from nearby sources. The rail spur from the Taean freight station located on the Korean State Railway's Taean Line, enters the factory itself, and plate glass is loaded into railcars indoors. Electricity powering the plant is supplied by the P'yŏngyang Thermal Power Plant.

== Four brother factories ==
According to North Korean media, along with Taean Heavy Machine Complex, Chollima Steel Complex and Kumsong Tractor Factory, the factory is a member of the "four brother factories(네형제공장, Nehyongjegongjang)" and is reported to engage in "Socialist competitions" between the companies that are held every year in the country.

== Namp'o Glass Bottle Factory ==
The Namp'o Glass Bottle Factory (남포유리병공장, Namp'o Yuribyŏng Kongjang), a subsidiary of the Taean Friendship Glass Factory, is a factory producing bottles and glassware in Namp'o, North Korea. The factory was originally located immediately adjacent to Sinnamp'o railway station, but this had been abandoned by 1971. In 2002 the decision was made to reopen the factory, and in 2010 the new plant was opened, located on a site near the Namp'o Shipyard. According to a KCNA report, the production process was modernised in 2012. Raw materials (sand) are brought from Monggŭmp'o near Changyŏn (terminus of the Changyŏn railway line) and from Kŭmip'o, both in Ryongyŏn County.

The facility is served by the Korean State Railway via the Namp'ohang Branch of the P'yŏngnam Line.
