= Hagap Underground Facility =

Alleged underground facility in North Korea

Coordinates: 40°04′48″N 126°10′56″E

Hagap Underground Facility (Korean: 하갑 지하 시설) is an alleged underground facility in North Korea. It is suspected that this underground facility is related to the nuclear activities of North Korea. This facility is located near the city of Huichon, which is situated in Chagang Province.

== Overview ==
The Hagap Underground Facility is believed to be an extensive network of tunnels excavated through the mountains, with a number of large entry points and a handful of support structures above ground. Satellite-based estimates indicate that the complex contains a number of structures, all connected by a complex network of tunnels, indicating a large-scale excavation project. Reports have suggested that 15,000 workers may have been involved in its construction, which might have begun in the early 1990s. The exact purpose of the Hagap Underground Facility still remains unknown.

== Geography ==
Hagap Underground facility is located in the mountainous region of North Korea. This region consists of mountains with steep slopes and a lot of forest cover, which provides natural concealment for the facility. It is located near the Myohyang Mountains, which were traditionally used for military and government activities.

The city of Huichon, which is located near the facility, is an industrial center that has machine-building and defense-related industries.

== History ==
Hagap is based on the defector testimony of Kang Myeong Do, a North Korean defector who claimed to have seen a large excavation project around Gaphyeondong, Huicheon, Chagang Province, when he was traveling from Huicheon to Kanggye, in January 1989. Kang claimed that the Third Engineer Bureau was constructing tunnels at the site. Since Mr. Kang's testimony, the site and surrounding areas were put under watch by both American and South Korean intelligence agencies. Although the existence of underground facilities was confirmed, whether or not they are a part of North Korea's nuclear program has not been determined. U.S. intelligence suspects Hagap of being variously a reprocessing facility, a high-explosives test site or even an underground nuclear reactor.

However, Daniel Pinkston, a North Korea military analyst for the Center for Nonproliferation Studies in Monterey, California, says more recent information suggests that it is merely a vast underground archive for the ruling Korean Workers' Party.

In March 1999, it was reported that US intelligence believed that North Korea was building three large underground facilities at Chagando, Hagap, Pyongan-bukto (between Taechon and Kusong), 10km from the first. It was suspected that the first site at Chagando is used for nuclear testing in violation of existing agreements such as the Agreed Framework.

Hagap first came under public scrutiny when a classified U.S. Defense Intelligence Agency report titled "Outyear Threat Report" was leaked to the press in January 1998, four years before Pyongyang acknowledged its nuclear enrichment program and seven years before its first nuclear test. The DIA was unable to identify the purpose of the facility but speculated that it could be used for nuclear production and/or storage.

In October 2002, North Korea admitted that it possesses an enrichment program, and this facility was named as a potential site for the uranium enrichment program. Other suspected sites include a facility at Yeongjeo-ri. In 2010, North Korea revealed a newly constructed uranium enrichment facility at Nyongbyon.

In 2009, the facility underwent a second expansion.

== See also ==
- North Korea and weapons of mass destruction
- Nyongbyon Nuclear Scientific Research Center
- Kumchang-ri Underground Facility
