= Kangson enrichment site =

Suspected uranium enrichment site in North Korea

Coordinates: 38.957°N 125.611°E

The Kangson enrichment site (Note: Alternatively written as Chollima) is the name given to a suspected uranium enrichment site located in Chollima-guyok, just outside of Pyongyang, North Korea, along the Pyongyang-Nampo Expressway.

== Function ==
The facility is suspected of being designed to produce uranium-235, which can be used in nuclear weapons. The United States believed that Kangson has an output double that of Yongbyon Nuclear Scientific Research Center, though some analysts say it may be only 20 percent larger.

In 2020 Olli Heinonen, formerly Deputy Director-General for Safeguards at the International Atomic Energy Agency, raised doubts about the building being an enrichment site. Commercial satellite imagery going back to the construction of the main building in the early 2000s raised doubts about the allegation. Early satellite images suggest the main building consists of multiple floors, and the second story likely has concrete flooring as would be found in an industrial workshop rather than a gas enrichment centrifuge hall. Essential support buildings, such as for decontamination of failed or ageing centrifuges were absent. Heinonen suggested it might be a secure machine tool workshop for production and testing of centrifuge components.

In 2021, Siegfried S. Hecker, former director of the Los Alamos National Laboratory who has visited North Korea nuclear facilities many times on behalf of the U.S., also stated that he was not convinced that Kangson was an enrichment site.

== History ==
The site was opened in the early 2000s, prior to enrichment activities at the Yongbyon Nuclear Scientific Research Center. The United States intelligence community began observing construction at the site in 2007, and identified it as an enrichment facility in 2010. Some European intelligence agencies reportedly were unconvinced with the assessment that the site is used for uranium enrichment. American analysts said that construction of the facility began in 2002 and it may have been operational by 2003.

In IAEA reports on North Korea in 2020, it was described that there are a group of buildings observation appear to be a uranium enrichment facility, and regular vehicle movements at the site suggest that activities are ongoing. However, further analysis of commercial satellite imagery raised doubts about that conclusion later that year. The characteristics of the site are more consistent with a plant that could manufacture components for centrifuges.

== See also ==
- Hagap Underground Facility
