= Kumchang-ri Underground Facility =

Excavated area in North Korea

Coordinates: 40°06′46″N 125°07′53″E

- Hangul: 금창리 지하 시설
- Hanja: 金昌里 地下 施設
- RR: Geumchang-ri jiha siseol
- MR: Kŭmch'ang-ri chiha sisŏl

Kumchang-ri Underground Facility (Korean: 금창리 지하 시설) is an excavated area in North Korea, north of the city of Kusong, that consists of tunnels, dams, and pipelines.

== History ==
The facility was originally discovered in 1989 with satellite imagery by the United States. The images showed construction crews installing pipelines and tunnels beneath the ground. The United States confronted North Korea about the new facility being built, and North Korea stated it was being used for food storage. However, North Korea said that the United States would need to pay US$300 million in order to access the site. An agreement was reached, and after payment of 600,000 tons of food, the United States was allowed to inspect the facility in May, 1999. The inspection did not conclude that the new facility was used for housing a nuclear facility, and after a second inspection in May, 2000, the United States decided that the facility would not be suitable for a nuclear facility.

== See also ==
- Hagap Underground Facility
