= North Korea–Thailand relations =

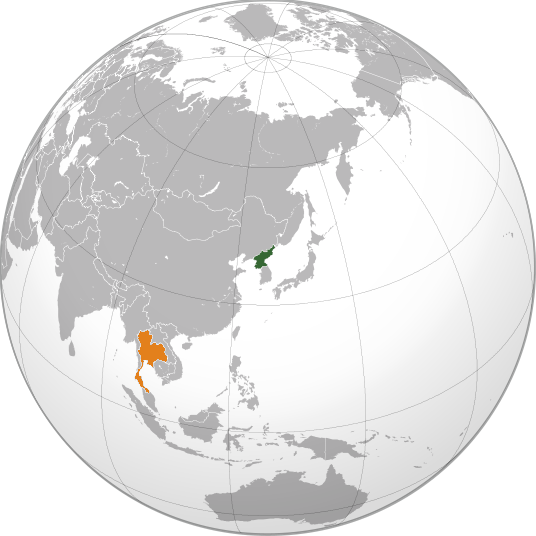

- North Korea: Thailand

Diplomatic mission
- Embassy of North Korea, Bangkok: Royal Thai Embassy, Beijing

Envoy
- Kim Je Bong: Chatchai Viriyavejakul

Bilateral relations between North Korea and Thailand were first established officially on 8 May 1975. Since 1975, relations between the two have experienced both periods of warmth and deterioration.

== History ==
=== Cold War ===
During the Korean War, Thailand fought on the side of the United Nations in support of South Korea against North Korean and its allies. By the end of the war, Thailand had dispatched 11,786 soldiers to Korea.

Bilateral relations between Thailand and North Korea were officially established on 8 May 1975.

=== Post-Cold War ===
During the 1990s, relations between Thailand and North Korea were cordial, with North Korea supporting Thailand and ASEAN's push for a Vietnamese withdrawal of troops from Cambodia.

In the 1990s and 2000s, North Korea's bid to join the ASEAN Regional Forum (ARF) gained the initial support of Thailand. North Korea had first expressed its desire to join the organisation in 1993, which was reaffirmed by its Vice Foreign Minister Choi Woo-jin visiting Indonesia, Malaysia and Thailand in 1995. In 2000, Thailand's Foreign Minister Surin Pitsuwan made a visit to Cambodia where he pushed Prime Minister Hun Sen to help North Korea into joining the ARF. This was supported by the Philippines, who together with Thailand and Cambodia initiated separate meetings with North Korea on the matter at the 2000 Non-Aligned Movement summit in Havana. Both Thailand and the Philippines' support for North Korean ascension was motivated predominately by a desire to restore credibility to the organisation following the 1997 Asian financial crisis. North Korea bid was successful and it continues to be a member of the ARF.

Thailand initially invited North Korea to attend the 2003 APEC summit in Bangkok, but retracted it following the emergence of North Korea's kidnapping of Anocha Panjoy in 1986.

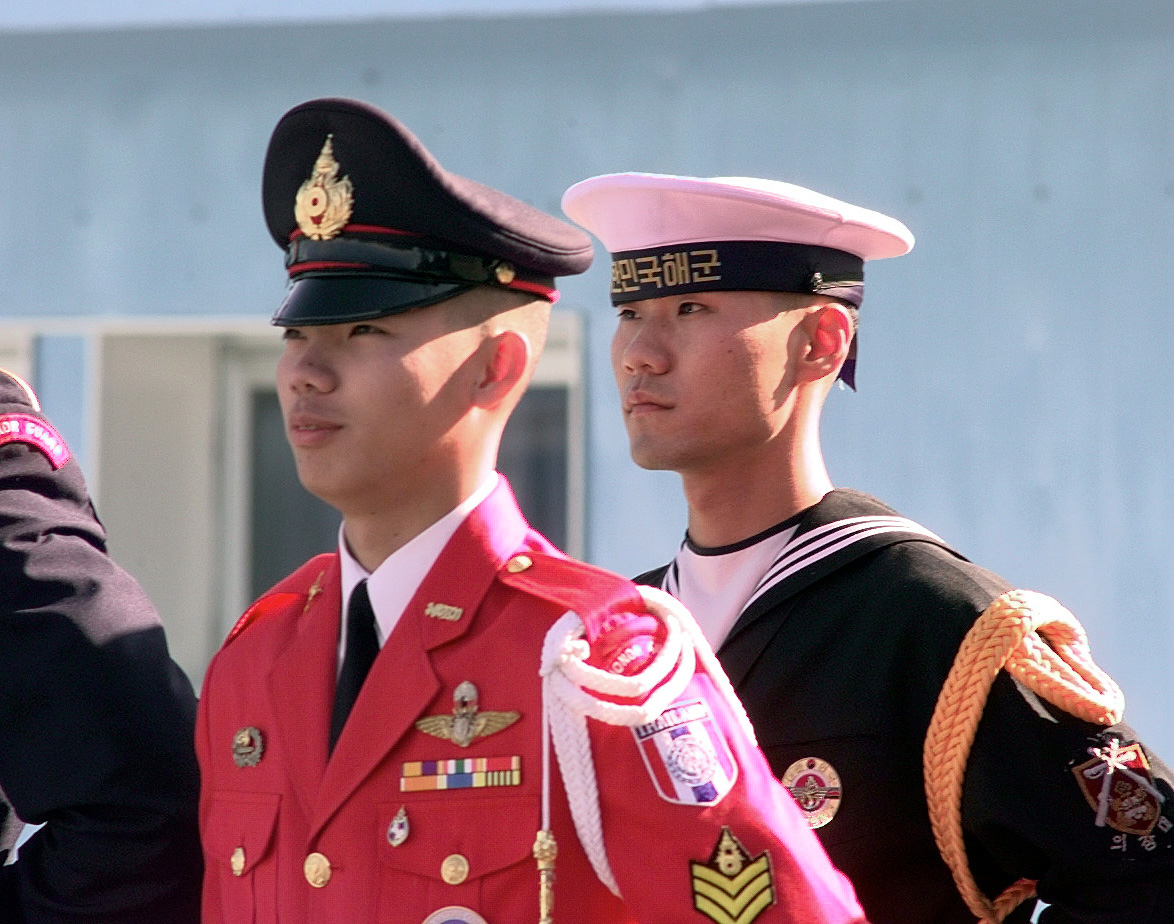
A Thai army sergeant stationed at Panmunjom along the DMZ in 2013.

=== Since 2006 ===
Following North Korea's testing of a nuclear weapon in 2006, relations between the two nations deteriorated as Thailand has since regularly condemned its nuclear weapon program.

In the midst of the 2017-18 North Korean crisis, the United States government began pushing Thailand to cut its business ties with North Korea. In particular, U.S. Secretary of State Rex Tillerson urged the Prayut government to crack down on North Korean front businesses operating in the country. On 9 August 2017, Prime-Minister Prayut Chan-o-cha responded by reiterating that Thailand has followed all obligations on North Korea set forth by the United Nations. Prayut subsequently said that on 12 December 2017 that no trade takes place between the two countries as a result of greater pressure from the United States.

== Economy and trade ==
According to the Thai Ministry of Commerce, trade between the two countries was worth US$126.3 million in 2014, US$82 million in 2015, US$28.6 million in 2016, and US$9.9 million in 2017. Trade between the two countries is thus very small, and has little impact on either's economies. According to risk consultant George McLeod, Thai goods exported by individuals to North Korea are first sent to border towns in China, where they are relabelled to remove the 'Made in Thailand' label before being sent over into North Korea. According to Balazs Szalontai of Korea University, Thailand top exports to North Korea were rice, rubber, wood, metals, minerals, chemicals, plastics, electronic circuits, and computer parts. On the other hand, he said North Korea exported to Thailand mainly chemicals, electrical machinery, gold, iron, seafood, and steel. According to the Customs Department of Thailand, North Korea imported three luxury cars in 2014, which may have broke UN sanctions placed onto North Korea. Additionally, the Customs Department reported purchases of $190,000 in motorbikes, 405 tons of chicken curry, and six tons of seafood.

According to The Observatory of Economic Complexity, Thailand exported $1.6 million in goods to North Korea, while North Korea only exported $276,000 in goods to Thailand in 2021. The top three goods each nation exported to each other are listed below:

North Korea's top exports to Thailand

- Plastic coated textile fabrics, $169,000
- Synthetic rubbers, $42,900
- Washing and bottling machines, $14,200

Thailand's top exports to North Korea

- Cyclic hydrocarbons, $1.53 million
- Animal feed, $45,500
- Sauces and seasonings, $21,800

Some of North Korea's early internet infrastructure was constructed by the Thai company Loxley Pacific. In 1998, the company obtained a license to launce a 2G GSM network in North Korea, and in 2002 helped established North Korea's first cellular network called SunNet. By the end of 2003, the service had over 20,000 users. Following the Ryongchon disaster in 2004, the network was discontinued. Despite this, the company continued to cooperate with the North Korean government in its internet infrastructure.

Several illegal North Korean businesses additionally operate within Thailand. In 2024, a report by the Panel of Experts of the UN 1718 Sanctions Committee listed North Korean spy Nam Chol Ung as having run offices in Thailand and Laos to evade sanctions, and using Thailand as a point to smuggle oil to North Korea. North Korea also operates several restaurants in Thailand. According to Jim Kelman of Meridian International Center, most of the money earned from these restaurants are sent back to North Korea, with these businesses likely also being used launder illegal funds.

== Diplomatic missions ==
North Korea operates an embassy in Bangkok, which is also its largest embassy in Southeast Asia. The current ambassador to Thailand is Han Jae Song. On the other hand, Thailand does not operate an embassy within North Korea. Instead, relations are carried through the Royal Thai Embassy in Beijing, China. The Thai ambassador to China since 2024, Chatchai Viriyavejakul, is also accredited to North Korea.

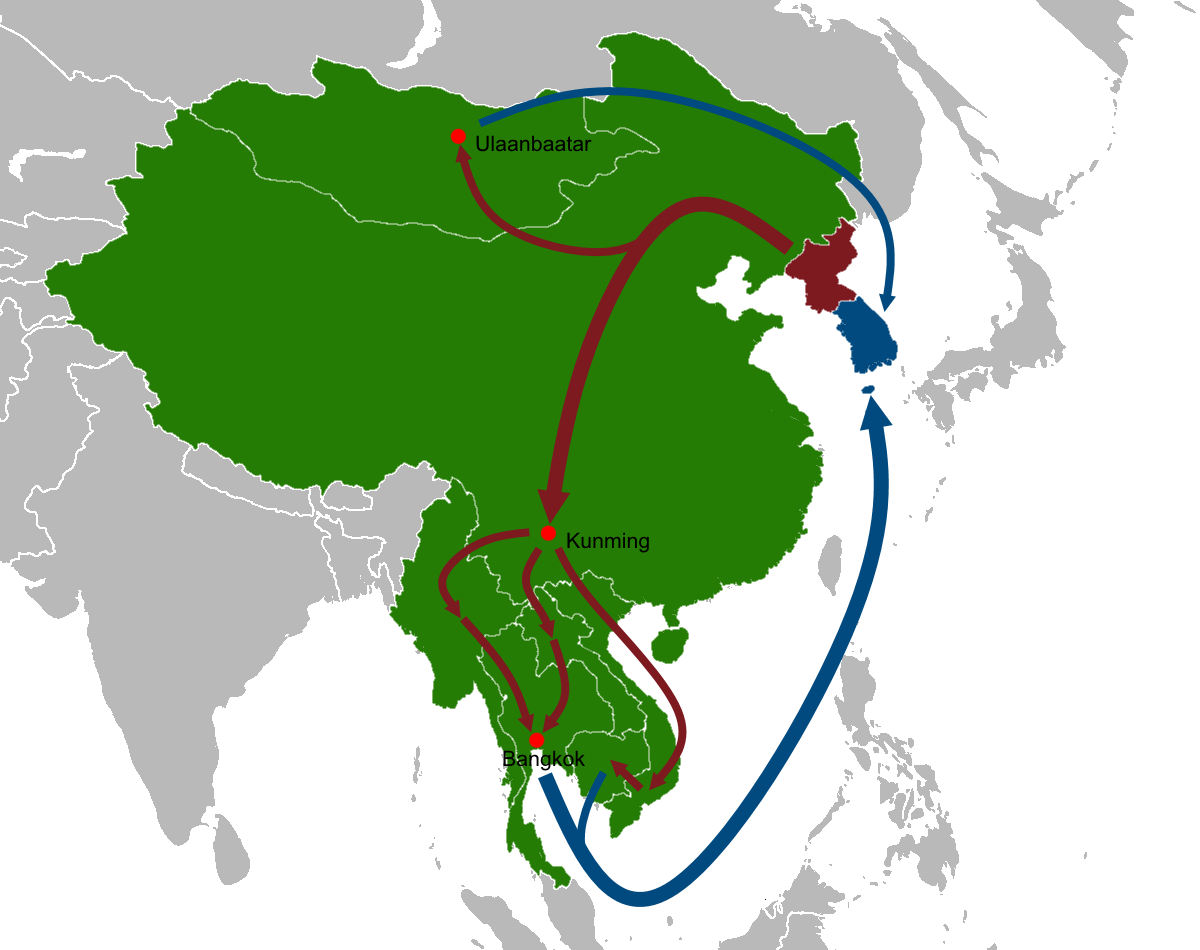
Map depicting common routes taken by North Korean defectors to get to South Korea

== North Korean defectors ==
A common route taken by North Korean defectors to reach South Korea, avoiding the heavily guarded Korean Demilitarized Zone, is to go through Thailand. Although Thailand is not a signatory of the UN Convention Relating to the Status of Refugees, Thailand instead hands them over to South Korean authorities in contrast to other countries along the route, such as China, who hand them back to North Korea. This policy is presented by the government as "Koreans being deported to Korea", although both Thailand and South Korea have been reluctant to discuss this matter. It is because of this that Thailand serves as the final transitory country for 90% of North Korean defectors heading for South Korea, with many North Koreans turning themselves into Thai authorities.

The number of North Koreans fleeing to Thailand has increased, from 46 in 2004, to around 2,500 in 2010. After 2011, the Thai government stopped publishing information of arrested North Koreans, but the reported number of arrested North Koreans was 535 in 2016, which then surged to 385 North Koreans arriving in the first half of 2017 alone. This increase in North Koreans arriving in Thailand has led to some strain on Thailand's immigration process.

== Abduction of Thai nationals ==
North Korea has been responsible for the abduction of a Thai national, Anocha Panjoy, who was taken to North Korea from Macau in 1978. Since her abduction, she has never returned to Thailand.
