= Taean Line =

Railway line in North Korea

Overview
- Native name: 대안선 (大安線)
- Status: Operational
- Owner: Chosen Government Railway (before 1945); Korean State Railway (since 1945)
- Locale: Namp'o-t'ŭkpyŏlsi
- Termini: Kangsŏ; Taean Hwamul
- Stations: 3

Service
- Type: Heavy rail, Freight rail
- Operator: Korean State Railway

Technical
- Line length: 11.7 km (7.3 mi)
- Number of tracks: Single track
- Track gauge: 1,435 mm (4 ft 8 1/2 in) standard gauge
- Electrification: 3000 V DC Overhead line
Route map
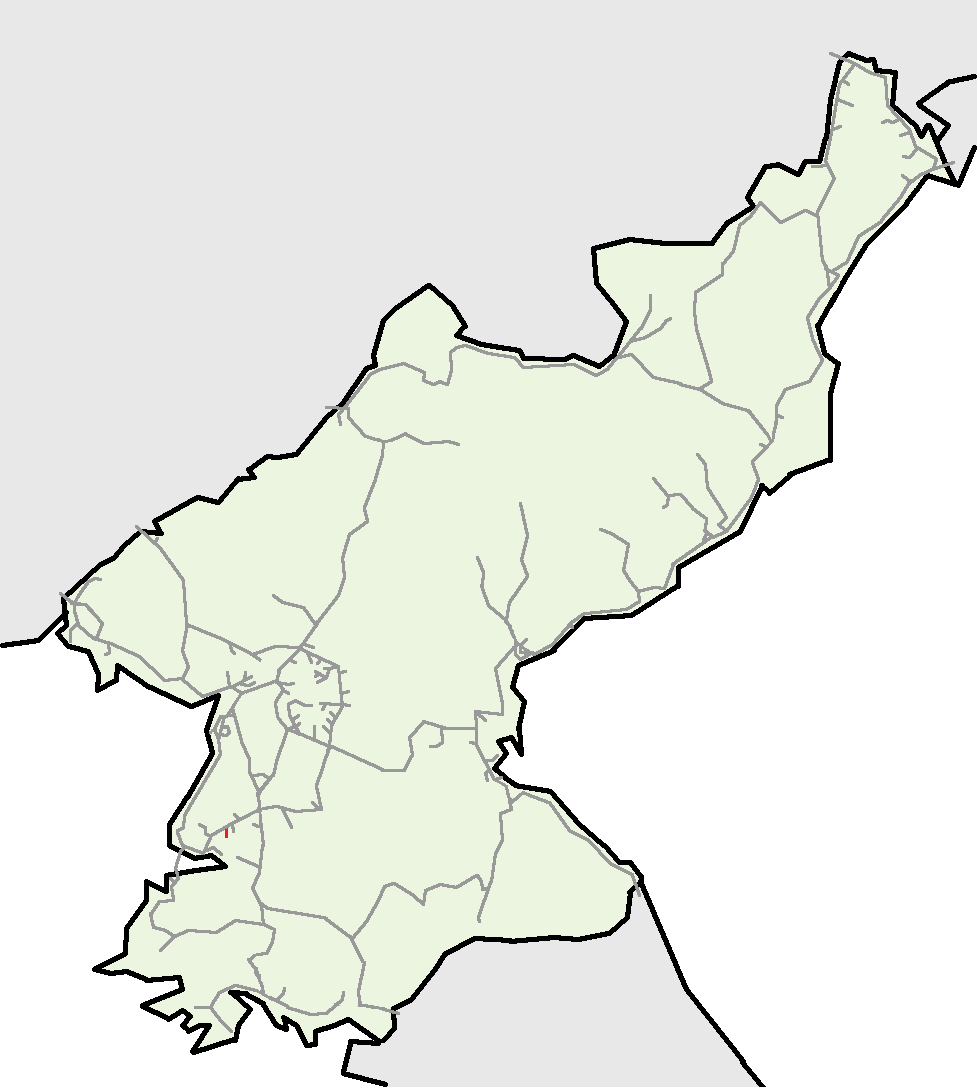

- Taean Line
- Hangul: 대안선
- Hanja: 大安線
- RR: Daeanseon
- MR: Taeansŏn

The Taean Line is an electrified standard-gauge secondary line of the Korean State Railway in Namp'o-t'ŭkpyŏlsi, North Korea, running from Kangsŏ in Kangsŏ-guyŏk on the P'yŏngnam Line to Taean Freight Station in Taean-guyŏk.

== History ==
The Taean Line was originally built during the Japanese occupation of Korea by the Chosen Government Railway. After the defeat of Japan in the Pacific War and the subsequent partition of Korea, the entirety of the line, being north of the 38th parallel, was located in the Soviet zone of occupation; on 10 August 1946, the Provisional People's Committee for North Korea nationalised all railways within its jurisdiction, including the Taean Line, and it has since been operated by the Korean State Railway.

== Services ==
All freight heading to and from the Taean Machine Complex located in Taean moves via this line. Steel arrives there from the Kimch'aek Iron & Steel Complex, the Hwanghae Iron & Steel Complex and the Ch'ŏllima Steel Complex, nonferrous metals from the Munp'yŏng Smelter, and imported materials and parts unloaded from ships at Namp'o Port. Also served by rail here are the Taean Electric Factory, and the Taean Friendship Glass Factory.

== Route ==
A yellow background in the "Distance" box indicates that section of the line is not electrified.

Distance (km)		Station Name		Former Name		
Total	S2S	Transcribed	Chosŏn'gŭl (Hanja)	Transcribed	Chosŏn'gŭl (Hanja)	Connections
0.0	0.0	Kangsŏ	강서 (江西)	Kiyang	기양 (岐陽)	P'yŏngnam Line
9.7	9.7	P'yŏngnam Taean	평남대안 (平南大安)			
11.7	2.0	Taean Hwamul	대안화물 (大安貨物)			Taean Machine Complex, Taean Electric Factory, Taean Friendship Glass Factory
