= Nyongbyon Nuclear Scientific Research Center =

North Korean nuclear site

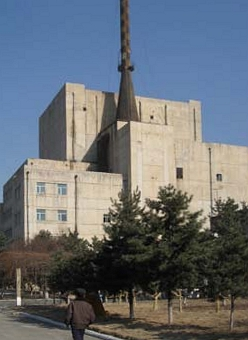
- The 5 MWe experimental reactor

Korean name
- Hangul: 녕변원자력연구소
- Hanja: 寧邊原子力硏究所
- RR: Nyeongbyeon wonjaryeok yeonguso
- MR: Nyŏngbyŏn wŏnjaryŏk yŏn'guso

The Nyongbyon Nuclear Scientific Research Center (Korean: 녕변원자력연구소) (Note: "Nyongbyon" is spelled and pronounced 녕변 (Nyŏngbyŏn) in North Korea and 영변 (Yŏngbyŏn) in South Korea.) is North Korea's major nuclear facility, operating its first nuclear reactors. It is located in Nyongbyon County in North Pyongan Province, about 100 km north of Pyongyang. The center produced the fissile material for North Korea's six nuclear weapon tests from 2006 to 2017, and since 2009 is developing indigenous light water reactor nuclear power station technology.

== Facilities ==
The major installations include all aspects of a Magnox nuclear reactor fuel cycle, based on the use of natural uranium fuel:

- a fuel fabrication plant,
- a 5 MWe experimental reactor producing power and district heating,
- a short-term spent fuel storage facility,
- a fuel reprocessing facility that recovers uranium and plutonium from spent fuel using the PUREX process.

Magnox spent fuel is not designed for long-term storage as both the casing and uranium metal core react with water; it is designed to be reprocessed within a few years of removal from a reactor. As a carbon dioxide cooled, graphite moderated Magnox reactor does not require difficult-to-produce enriched uranium fuel or a heavy water moderator it is an attractive choice for a wholly indigenous nuclear reactor development.

The Magnox facilities were disabled in 2007 in accord with the six-party talks agreement, but following the breakdown of that agreement were partially re-enabled in 2009 to reprocess existing stocks of spent fuel. On 15 September 2015, North Korea announced that the reactor had resumed operation.

The center also has an IRT-2000 pool-type research reactor, supplied by the Soviet Union in 1963, operational since 1965. The reactor fuel is IRT-2M type assemblies of 10%, 36% and 80% enriched uranium. As the center has not received fresh fuel since Soviet times, this reactor is now (February 2007) only run occasionally for experiments or to produce isotopes, particularly iodine-131 for thyroid cancer radiation therapy.

In 2009, the building of a small indigenous experimental light water reactor began, with trial operations starting in 2023. In 2010, a uranium enrichment plant began operating.

The Yongbyon Nuclear Scientific Research Center site occupies 24.8 square kilometres (9.6 sq mi). It has two sections, the nuclear research section and a larger residential district (sometimes named Bungang or Pun’gangni), separated and surrounded by fencing.

== History ==
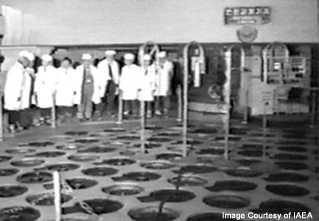
The 5 MWe reactor, showing the fuel channels access ports (2005)

Construction of the 5 MWe experimental reactor began in 1980, and the reactor first went critical in 1986. This reactor was an initial small technology proving reactor for a following development program of larger Magnox reactors. The spent nuclear fuel reprocessing facility appeared to still be under construction in 1992. The 5 MWe experimental reactor operated intermittently until 1994 when it was shut down in accordance with the U.S.–North Korea Agreed Framework. Following the breakdown of the Agreed Framework in 2002, operation restarted in February 2003, creating plutonium within its fuel load at a rate of about 6 kilograms (13 lb) per year. The reactor fuel was replaced between April and June 2005. The spent nuclear fuel has been reprocessed with an estimated yield of about 24 to 42 kilograms (53 to 93 lb) of plutonium metal, some of which was used for the nuclear weapons involved in the 2006 and 2009 North Korean nuclear tests.

Nyongbyon is also the site of a 50 MWe Magnox prototype power reactor, but construction was halted in 1994 about a year from completion in accord with the Agreed Framework, and by 2004 the structures and pipework had deteriorated badly. This construction was being dismantled in 2010.

Another 200 MWe Magnox full-scale power reactor was being constructed at Taechon, 20 km north-west of Nyongbyon, (39.928°N 125.569°E) until construction was also halted in 1994 in accord with the Agreed Framework. By 2005 reconstruction of this reactor was uneconomic.

The reactor designs were based on declassified information about the British Magnox design at Calder Hall and elsewhere, and the spent fuel reprocessing plant on the multi-national European Company for the Chemical Processing of Irradiated Fuels (EUROCHEMIC) plant at Mol-Dessel in Belgium.

=== 2007 shutdown ===
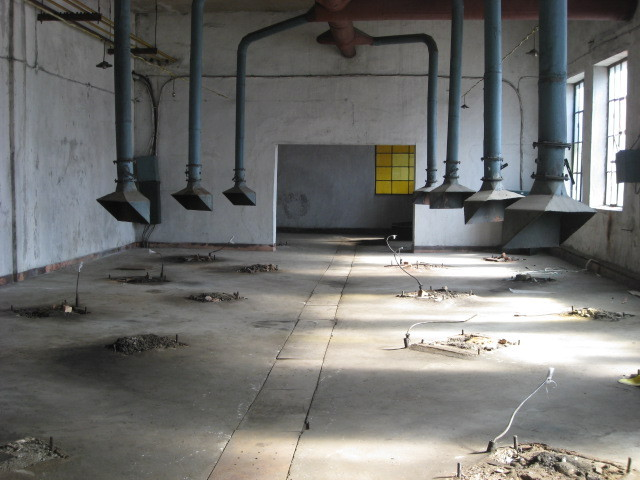
Empty machine shop in the disabled fuel fabrication facility (February 2008)

On 13 February 2007, an agreement was reached at the Six party talks that North Korea will shut down and seal the Magnox nuclear reactor and associated facilities and invite back International Atomic Energy Agency personnel to conduct all necessary monitoring and verifications. In return for this North Korea will receive emergency energy assistance from the other five parties in the form of 50,000 tons of heavy fuel oil.

International Atomic Energy Agency (IAEA) inspectors arrived at the site on 28 June to discuss verification and monitoring arrangements for the shutdown. This had been delayed from April due to a dispute with the United States over Banco Delta Asia. On 3 June an anonymous South Korean government official indicated that the shutdown may start following the first oil shipment later in the month. On 14 July, Sean McCormack stated that North Korea had told the US that the reactor had been shut down. He added that the US welcomed the news, and was awaiting verification from the IAEA team. The next day, IAEA chief Mohamed ElBaradei announced the UN's confirmation that the reactor had been shut down. On 18 July 2007, the IAEA confirmed that all five nuclear facilities at Nyongbyon had been shut down.

In his Introductory Statement to the IAEA Board of Governors on 2008-03-03, the Director General stated that he could not provide an update on the disabling of the facilities, as it was not undertaken by the IAEA. All fuel rods from the 5 MWe Experimental Nuclear Power Plant and nuclear material generated by the disabling of the Nuclear Fuel Fabrication Plant were under IAEA containment and surveillance.

=== 2008 cooling tower demolition ===
On 27 June 2008 North Korea destroyed the most visible symbol of its nuclear weapons program – the cooling tower at its main atomic reactor in the complex. The implosion was witnessed by a number of international journalists and diplomats.

The demolition of the 60-foot (18 m)-tall cooling tower, which carried off waste heat to the atmosphere, is a response to U.S. concessions after the North delivered a declaration of its nuclear programs to be dismantled. The United States paid the US$2.5 million demolition fee.

=== Possible reactivation ===
During 2008 tensions resurfaced between North Korea and the U.S. due to disagreements over the six-party talks disarmament process. On 8 October 2008, IAEA inspectors were forbidden by the North Korean government to conduct further inspections of the site. However two days later the U.S. removed North Korea from the U.S. State Sponsors of Terrorism list and the Nyongbyon deactivation process resumed.

=== 2009 resumption of reprocessing ===
According to the state-run North Korean news agency KCNA website, the DPRK resumed the reprocessing of spent fuel to recover plutonium on 25 April 2009 in response to the UN's condemnation of its recent rocket launch. This material supplemented that used for nuclear weapons testing.

=== Light water reactor ===
In 2009, North Korea announced its intention to build an indigenous experimental light water reactor (LWR) and the uranium enrichment technology to provide its nuclear fuel. In 2010, a 2,000 gas centrifuge uranium enrichment plant to produce low enriched uranium (LEU) fuel began operating, and construction started on the experimental 25 to 30 MWe LWR, with a target operation date for the reactor of 2012.

In November 2011, satellite imagery indicated that the LWR construction was progressing rapidly, with the concrete structures largely completed. The LWR is being built on the site of the demolished cooling tower of the experimental Magnox reactor. Following the building of this experimental LWR, North Korea intends to build larger LWRs for electricity generation. Initial estimates were that the reactor would be put into operation in 2013, but the reactor was not externally complete until 2016.

In 2017, several activities were noted involving construction, a dam was built to provide sufficient amount of water for cooling system, a switchyard and connections to transmission line were made along with facilities presumably used for maintenance and repair. Activity that suggests components were being transferred to the building were noted too. In 2018, it was believed that the preliminary testing of the reactor had started and that the reactor would begin to operate 2018 or 2019. The reactor is linked to the power grid, with an expected output is 25 to 30 megawatts, enough to supply electricity for about 50,000 inhabitants.

As of May 2024, intermittent cooling water flows indicate pre-operational tests are probably being conducted.

According to the IAEA, the reactor ran intermittently for nearly two years up to August 2025, running 70% of the time from August 2024 to August 2025 though unlikely at full power. It is estimated the reactor at full power could produce around 20 kilograms of plutonium per year, though it is not clear whether the fuel will be reprocessed. The Institute for Science and International Security (ISIS) assessed that operation of reactor was resumed in November 2025.

=== Suspension of uranium enrichment ===
In February 2012, North Korea announced that it would suspend uranium enrichment at Nyongbyon, and not conduct any further tests of nuclear weapons while productive negotiations involving the United States continue. Additionally, North Korea would allow IAEA inspectors to monitor operations at Nyongbyon. The U.S. reaffirmed that it does not have hostile intent toward the DPRK, and is prepared to improve bilateral relationships. Nuclear enrichment was presumably resumed following the collapse of the Leap Day Deal.

=== 2013 planned restart of operation ===
In March 2013, North Korea announced that they would be restarting operation of the 5 MWe experimental reactor. In order to do so, the disabled secondary cooling system will have to be restored.

On 15 September 2015, North Korea announced that the Yongbyon nuclear site is in full operation, including the 5 MWe experimental reactor. However, satellite imagery in April 2016 suggested it was not operating at a high power level.

Infra-red imagery analysis covering from September 2016 to June 2017 showed that the 5 MWe experimental reactor had either not been operated, or operated at a low-level. The Radiochemical Laboratory had operated intermittently.

=== 2018 Pyongyang Agreement ===
During the September 2018 inter-Korean summit, North Korean leader Kim Jong-Un and South Korean leader Moon Jae-In signed the "Pyongyang Joint Declaration of September 2018". The agreement states, among other things, that the North Korean government will only dismantle Nyongbyon if the US would engage in correlative action.

As of January 2019, Nyongbyon's main facilities did not appear to be operating. However, in August 2021, the International Atomic Energy Agency reported that North Korea appeared to have restarted the 5 MW reactor.

== Organization ==
The Nyongbyon facility was described in 2013 as operating the following ten sub-branches:

1. Isotope Utilization Institute
2. Neutron Physics Institute
3. Nuclear Electromagnetics Institute
4. Nuclear Physics Institute
5. Nuclear Material Institute
6. Nuclear Energy Research Institute
7. Uranium Resources Development Institute
8. Radiochemical Laboratory
9. Reactor Design Institute
10. Radiation Protection Institute

== See also ==
- Kangson enrichment site
- North Korea and weapons of mass destruction
- Nuclear power in North Korea
- Ri Hong-sop
- Hagap Underground Facility
