= Daniel Pinkston =

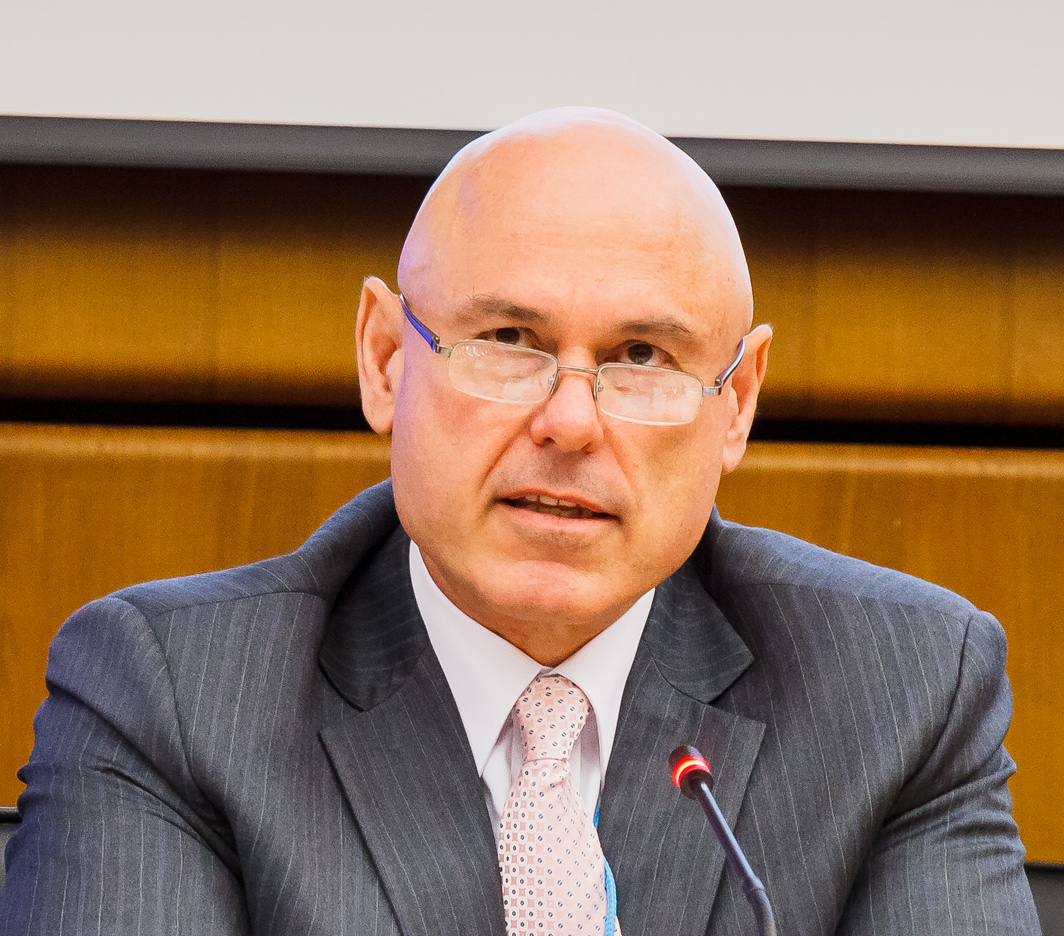
Pinkston speaking at the CTBT Public Policy course in 2014

Daniel Pinkston is North East Asia Deputy Project Director with the International Crisis Group in Seoul. He was Director of the East Asia Nonproliferation Project at the Center for Nonproliferation Studies in Monterey, California, and has been Associate editor of The Nonproliferation Review since 2004.

== Education ==
Pinkston has a master's degree in Korean studies from Yonsei University and a PhD in international affairs from the University of California, San Diego.

== Publications ==
- Pinkston, Daniel A. (2003). "Domestic politics and stakeholders in the North Korean missile development program." The Nonproliferation Review. 10(2), 51—65.
- Chapters in Engagement with North Korea (Hiroshima Peace Institute; Hiroshima), The Evolving U.S.-Japan Alliance: Balancing Soft and Hard Power, A Turning Point: Democratic Consolidation in the ROK and Strategic Readjustment in the US-ROK Alliance (Honolulu, 2005)

== See also ==
- North Korea and weapons of mass destruction
- Foreign relations of North Korea
- North Korea–United States relations
