= Chollima-guyok =

Ch'ŏllima Ward 천리마구역
- Wards

Korean transcription(s)
  - Chosŏn'gŭl: 천리마구역
  - Hancha: 千里馬區域
  - McCune-Reischauer: Ch'ŏllima-guyŏk
  - Revised Romanization: Cheollima-guyeok
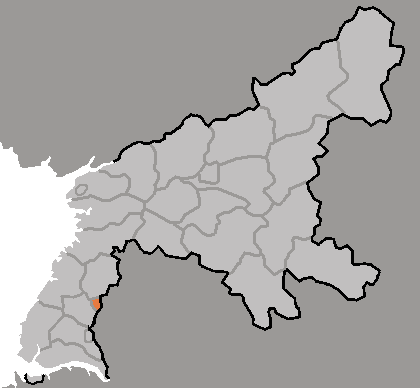
- Coordinates: 38°56′59″N 125°34′54″E
- Country: North Korea
- Province: South P'yŏngan
- Special City: Namp'o-tŭkpyŏlsi
- Administrative divisions: 17 tong, 1 ri

Area
  - Total: 109.1 km^{2} (42.1 sq mi)

Population (2008)
  - Total: 139,489
  - Density: 1,279/km^{2} (3,311/sq mi)

Ch'ŏllima is a kuyŏk in Namp'o Special City, North Korea. Prior to 2004, it was Ch'ŏllima-kuyok, a district of northeastern Namp'o Directly Governed City. Following the demotion of Namp'o in 2004, Ch'ŏllima became an independent county. The region was part of Kangsŏ county in 1952, and was entered into Taean city; when Taean was demoted to county in 1983, it became part of Namp'o Special City.

== Administrative divisions ==
Ch'ŏllima-guyŏk is divided into 17 tong (neighbourhoods) and 1 ri (village):

- Chung-dong (중동/中洞)
- Ch'ŏnjin-dong (천진동/天眞洞)
- Ch'ŏnnae-dong (천내동/川內洞)
- Hwasŏk-tong (화석동/花石洞)
- Kangch'ŏl-dong (강철동/鋼鐵洞)
- Kwanp'o-dong (관포동/觀浦洞)
- Munch'ŏn-dong (문천동/聞天洞)
- Ponghwa-dong (봉화동/烽火洞)
- Posan-dong (보산동/保山洞)
- P'ogu-dong (포구동/浦口洞)
- Saegŏri-dong (새거리동/새거리洞)
- Sangbong-dong (상봉동/相逢洞)
- Ssari-dong (싸리동/싸리洞)
- Taebosan-dong (대보산동/大寶山洞)
- Talma-dong (달마동/達馬洞)
- Wŏnjŏng-dong (원정동/遠征洞)
- Yŏkchŏn-dong (역전동/驛前洞)
- Koch'ang-ri (고창리/古創里)

== Economy ==
There are numerous ironworks and related factories in Ch'ŏllima. The metalworking industry became active in the area during the period of Japanese rule in the early 20th century.

== Transportation ==
Ch'ŏllima stretches along the Taedong River, which provides a convenient route for transportation by ground and water. Frequent ferries connect the county to P'yŏngyang and Songrim. The Youth Hero Motorway also passes through the county, as does the P'yŏngnam line of the Korean State Railway.

== Military ==
It is the location of the Kangson enrichment site.

== See also ==
- List of secondary subdivisions of North Korea
- Geography of North Korea
- South Pyongan
- Chollima Movement
