= Chollima Steel Complex =

Steel mill in North Korea

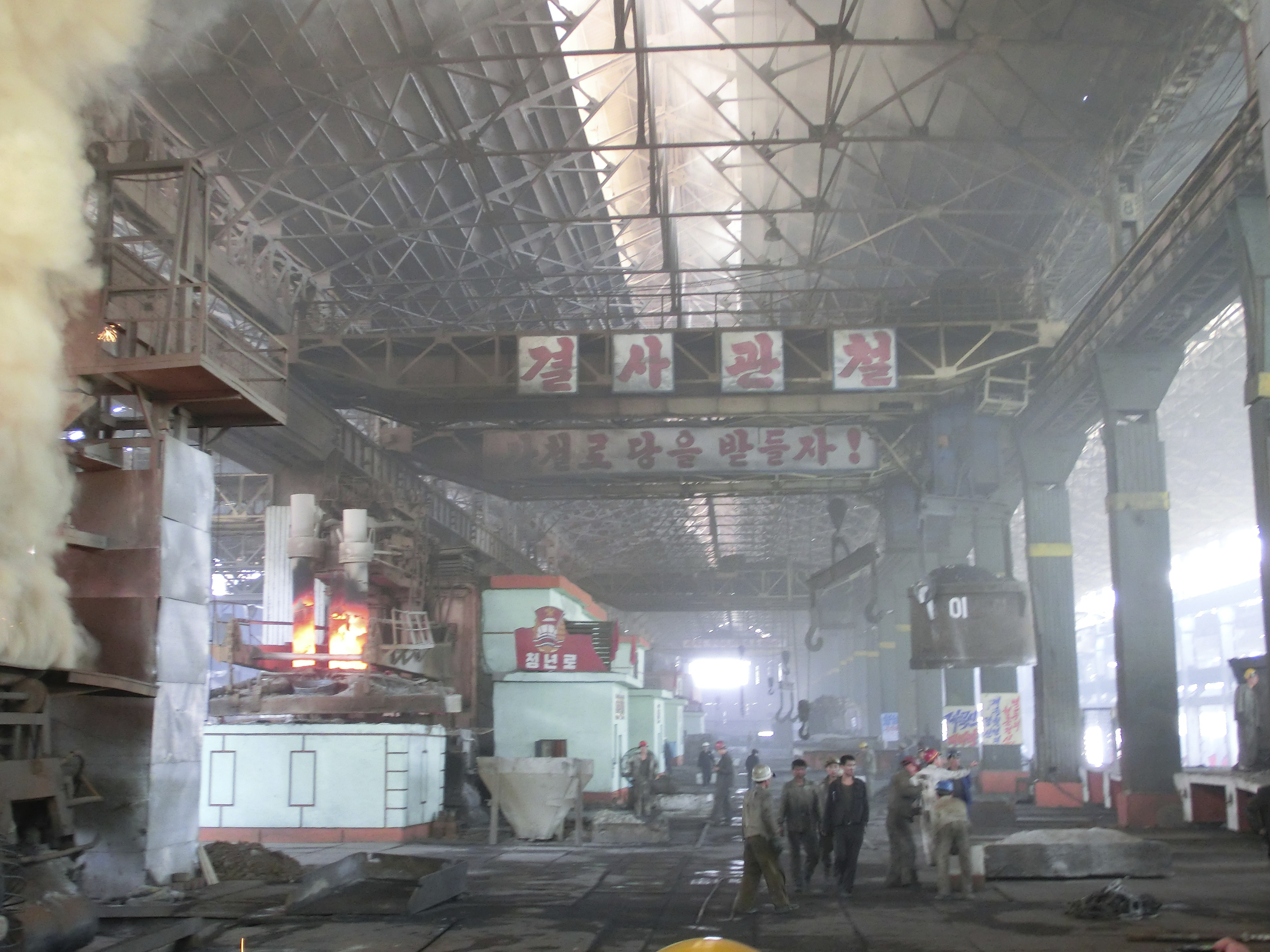
- Coordinates: 38°55′19″N 125°34′20″E

- Chollima Steel Complex
- Chosŏn'gŭl: 천리마제강련합기업소
- Hancha: 千里馬製鋼聯合企業所
- Revised Romanization: Cheollima Jegang Ryeonhap Gieopso
- McCune–Reischauer: Ch'ŏllima Chegang Ryŏnhap Kiŏpso

The Ch'ŏllima Steel Complex in Kangch'ŏl-dong, Ch'ŏllima-guyŏk, Namp'o is one of North Korea's largest steel mills with an annual production capacity in the millions of tons. Originally opened during the Japanese colonial era as the Kangsŏn Steel Works, it was nationalised after the partition of Korea and has since been expanded several times.

Currently, there are facilities for the production of steel and other alloys, steel rods, pipes and other metal products, and a facility for the production of large forgings and castings, along with a test and analysis centre. The production facility is equipped with electric furnaces, crushing and rolling mills, 6- and 10,000 tonne presses, oxygen separators and continuous mills. The complex also features metallurgical academies, cultural centres, childcare facilities, clinics, nightclubs and nursing homes. The complex was awarded the Order of Kim Il Sung.

The facility is served by the Korean State Railway via Kangsŏn on the P'yŏngnam Line with extensive trackage within the complex.

Kim Jong Il visited the site in 2008 or Juche 97 according to the North Korean Calendar which starts on 1912 following the birth of Kim Il Sung.

== Four brother factories ==
According to North Korean media, along with Taean Heavy Machine Complex, Kumsong Tractor Factory and Taean Friendship Glass Factory, the factory is a member of the "four brother factories(네형제공장, Nehyongjegongjang)" and is reported to engage in "Socialist competitions" between the companies that are held every year in the country.
