= Taean-guyok =

Taean Ward 대안구역
- Wards

Korean transcription(s)
  - Chosŏn'gŭl: 대안구역
  - Hancha: 大安區域
  - McCune-Reischauer: Taean-guyŏk
  - Revised Romanization: Daean-guyeok
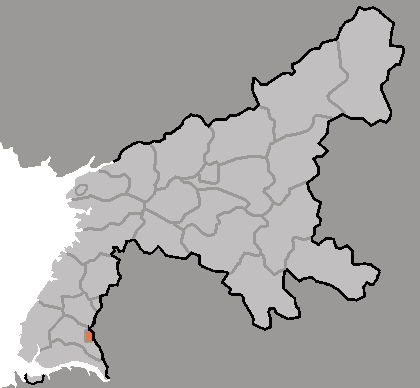
- Country: North Korea
- Province: South P'yŏngan
- Special City: Namp'o-tŭkpyŏlsi
- Administrative divisions: 8 tong, 3 ri

Area
  - Total: 87.31 km^{2} (33.71 sq mi)

Population (2008)
  - Total: 77,219
  - Density: 884.4/km^{2} (2,291/sq mi)

Taean is a ward in Namp'o Special City, South P'yŏngan province, North Korea.

== Administrative divisions ==
Taean District is divided into 8 tong (neighbourhoods) and 3 ri (villages):

- Ch'ungsŏng-dong (충성동/忠誠洞)
- Kŭmsan-dong (금산동/金山洞)
- Oksu-dong (옥수동/玉水洞)
- Saemaŭl-dong (새마을동/새마을洞)
- Taean-dong (대안동/大安洞)
- Taejŏng-dong (대정동/大井洞)
- Tŏksŏng-dong (덕성동/德性洞)
- Ŭndŏk-tong (은덕동/恩德洞)
- Osil-li (오신리/吾新里)
- Tami-ri (다미리/多美里)
- Wŏlmae-ri (월매리/月梅里)

== Transportation ==
Taean District is served by the Taean Line of the Korean State Railway.
