= Kangso-guyok =

Coordinates: 38°55′N 125°32′E

Kangsŏ Ward 강서구역
- Ward

Korean transcription(s)
  - Chosŏn'gŭl: 강서구역
  - Hancha: 江西區域
  - McCune-Reischauer: Kangsŏ-guyŏk
  - Revised Romanization: Gangseo-guyeok
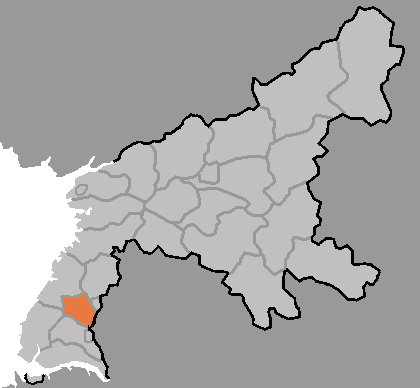
- Country: North Korea
- Province: South P'yŏngan
- Special City: Namp'o-tŭkpyŏlsi
- Administrative divisions: 14 tong, 6 ri

Area
  - Total: 237.1 km^{2} (91.5 sq mi)

Population (2008)
  - Total: 191,356
  - Density: 807.1/km^{2} (2,090/sq mi)

Kangsŏ is a ward in Namp'o Special City, South P'yŏngan province, North Korea. The population is 191,356.

== Administrative divisions ==
Kangsŏ-guyŏk is divided into 14 tong (neighbourhoods) and 6 ri (villages):

- Chŏnjin-dong (전진동/前進洞)
- Kisan-dong (기산동/岐山洞)
- Kiyang-dong (기양동/岐陽洞)
- Munhwa-dong (문화동/文化洞)
- Namsan-dong (남산동/南山洞)
- Pongsang-dong (봉상동/鳳上洞)
- Ragwŏn-dong (락원동/樂園洞)
- Saemmul-dong (샘물동/샘물洞)
- San'ŏp-tong (산업동/産業洞)
- Segil-dong(세길동/세길洞)
- Sŏgi-dong (서기동/西機洞)
- Sŏhak-tong (서학동/西鶴洞)
- T'anp'o-dong (탄포동/灘浦洞)
- Tŏkhŭng-dong (덕흥동/德興洞)
- Chamjil-li (잠진리/箴進里)
- Ch'ŏngsal-li (청산리/淸山里)
- Sammyo-ri (삼묘리/三墓里)
- Susal-li (수산리/水山里)
- Taesŏng-ri (태성리/台城里)
- Yaksu-ri (약수리/藥水里)

== Transport ==
Kangsŏ-guyŏk is served by the P'yŏngnam and Taean lines of the Korean State Railway.

== Landmarks ==
- Kangsŏ Three Tombs, National Treasure #28

== See also ==
- Subdivisions of North Korea
- Geography of North Korea
