= Nampo =

Nampo 남포시
- Special city
- Nampho

Korean transcription(s)
  - Chosŏn'gŭl: 남포특별시
  - Hancha: 南浦特別市
  - McCune-Reischauer: Namp'o-t'ŭkpyŏlsi
  - Revised Romanization: Nampo-teukbyeolsi
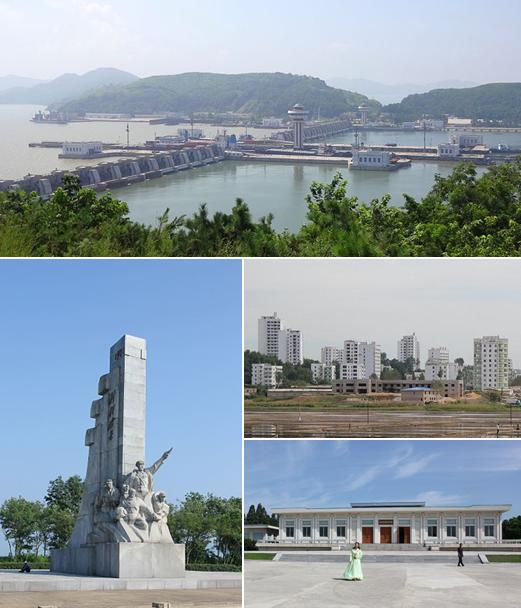
- Clockwise from top: the West Sea Barrage, view of Nampo city, the Chongsan-ri co-operative farm, a monument

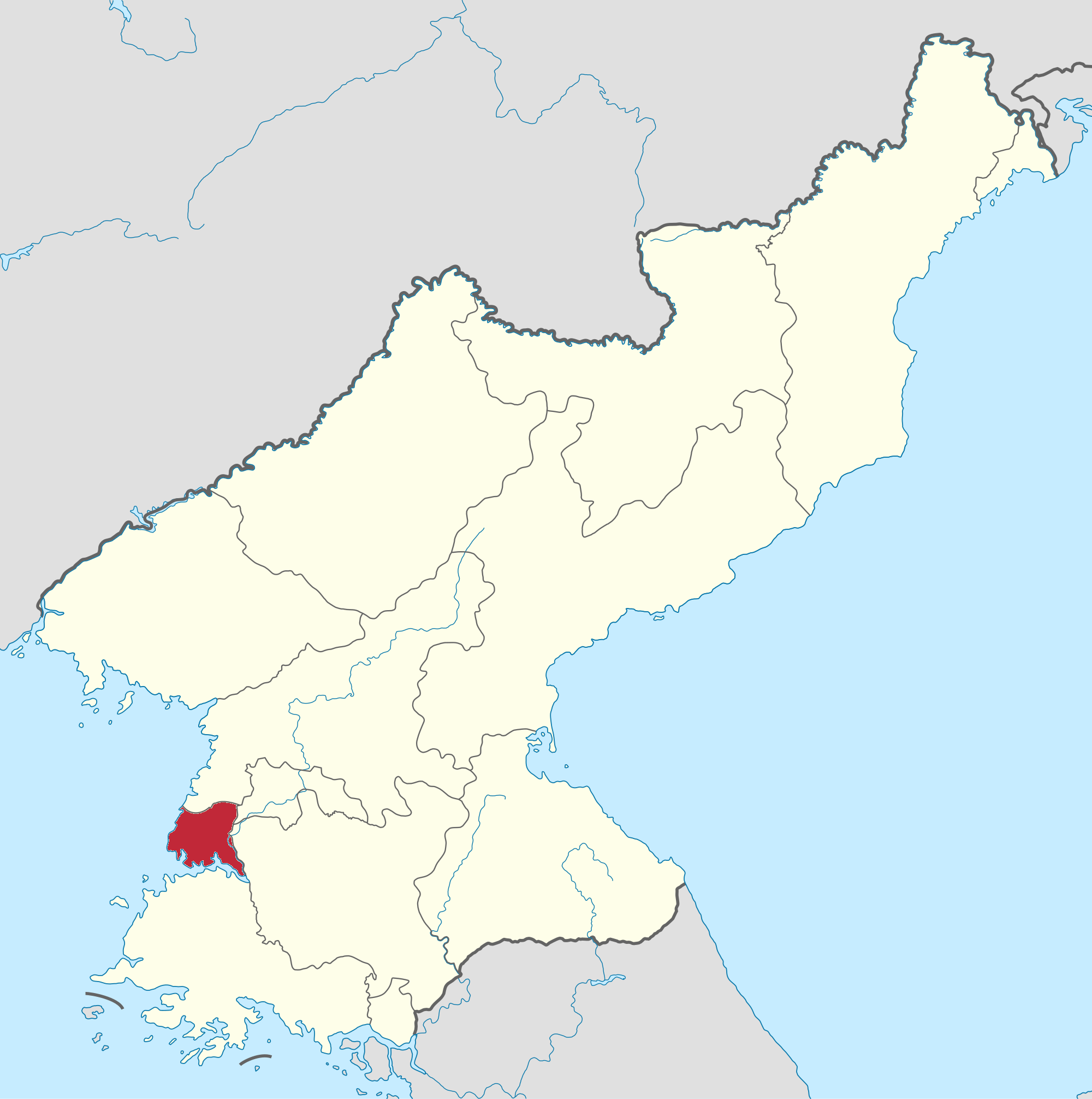
- Map of North Korea showing the location of Nampo

- Location in North Korea
- Coordinates: 38°44′08″N 125°24′32″E
- Country: North Korea
- Administrative divisions: 5 guyok, 2 gun

Government
  - Municipal Party Committee Chief Secretary: Ri Jae-nam (WPK)
  - Municipal People's Committee Chairman: Song Seung-cheo

Area
  - Special city: 1,281 km^{2} (495 sq mi)

Population (2014)
  - Special city: 983,660
  - Density: 767.9/km^{2} (1,989/sq mi)
  - Urban: 703,317
  - Rural: 280,343
  - Dialect: P'yŏngan
- Time zone: UTC+9 (Pyongyang Time)
- ISO 3166 code: KP-14

Nampo (North Korean official spelling: Nampho; pronounced [nam.pʰo]), also spelled Namp'o, is a major city in North Korea which is the country's fourth-largest by population. The city is an important seaport in the country as it lies on the northern shore of the Taedong River estuary, 15 km east of the estuary's mouth. Formerly known as Chinnamp'o, it was a provincial-level "Directly Governed City" ("Chikhalsi") from 1980 to 2004, and was designated a "Special City" ("T'ŭkpyŏlsi", 특별시; 特別市) in 2010. Nampo is approximately 50 km southwest of Pyongyang, at the mouth of the Taedong River. Since North Korean independence, the city has developed a wide range of industry and has seen significant recent redevelopment.

== History ==
=== Before formation of North Korea ===
The city belonged to Gojoseon until the Three Kingdoms era, when it was taken by Goguryeo. During this time, the city was part of Sogyong (now Pyongyang) until the Goryeo dynasty, when in the aftermath of the Myocheong rebellion, Sogyong was split into six counties, of which currently constitute Nampo are Kangso-hyon, Ryonggang-hyon and Samhwa-hyon. In the late Goryeo period, the area was named Chungnampo for the village of Pogu, located to the south of Chungsan County. After the establishment of Joseon dynasty, the area belonged to Pyongan Province.

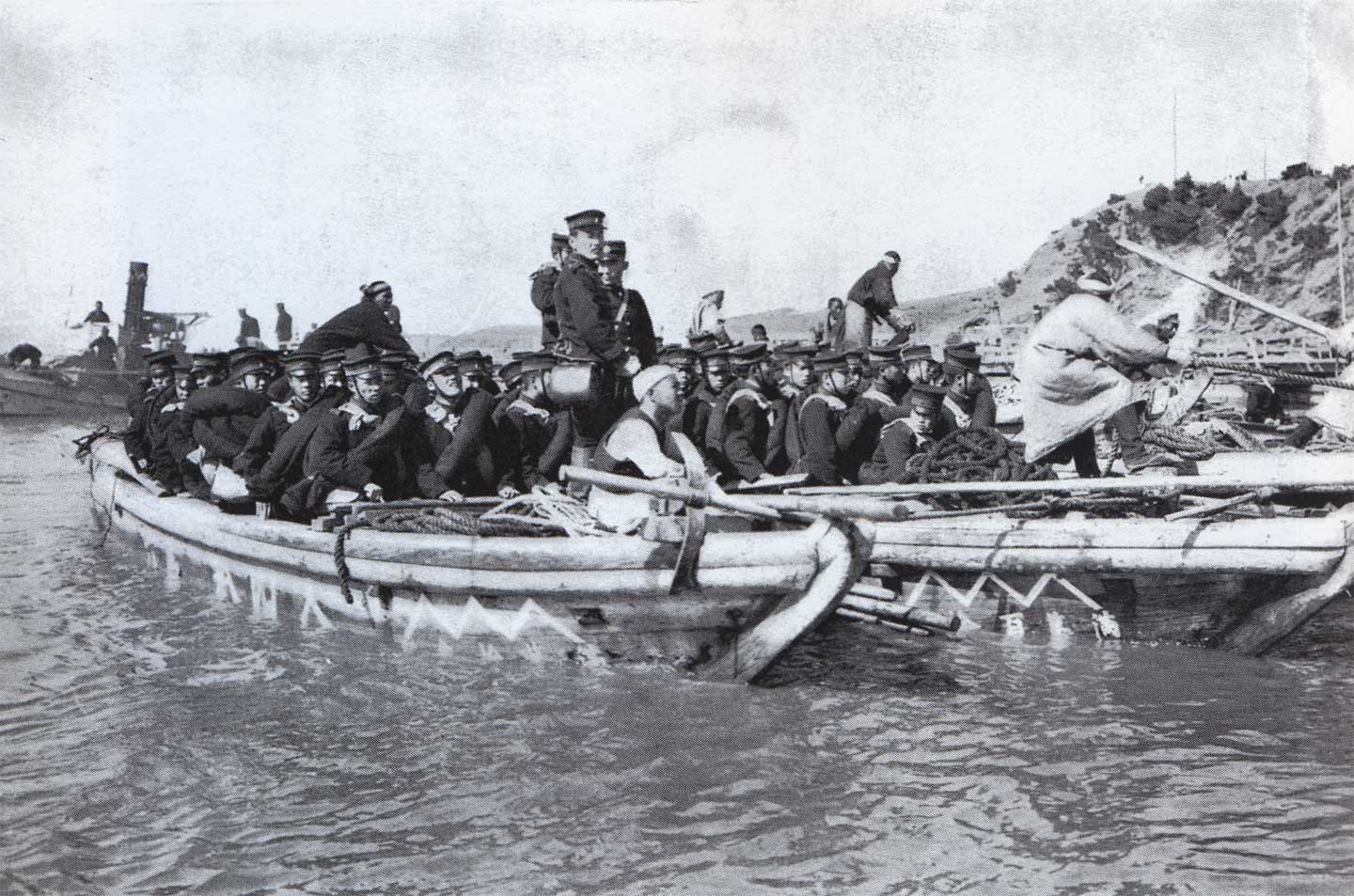
Japanese troops landing on Nampo during the First Sino-Japanese War

The name of the city comes from the fishing village that was originally located in the Samhwa-hyon (Note: Now located in Ryonggang County1) area of South Pyongan Province. The city was renamed to Chinnampo during the Japanese occupation of Korea, by adding the character '鎭' (Note: meaning 'to suppress, hold down') as during the First Sino-Japanese War, the Japanese landed in Nampo and defeated the Qing dynasty forces. The name was immediately reverted to Nampo after liberation to be rid of colonial legacies.

Emblem of Chinnanfufu (Jinnampo-bu), the administrative division of Korea during Japanese rule that Nampo fell under.

=== After formation of North Korea ===
The city was founded in 1950 and contained 27 ri. Various rearrangements occurred in 1952 and by 1960, there were 15 dong and 8 ri.

In December 1979, Nampo became a directly-governed city. Taean-si, Ryonggang-gun were absorbed into Nampo and the former Nampo-si was reorganised into Nampo-guyok with jurisdiction over 26 dongs.

In 1983, a major reorganisation occurred and Nampo-guyok was split up into Waudo-guyok and Hanggu-guyok while Taean-si was split into Chollima-guyok, Taean-guyok and Kangso-guyok.

On 9 January 2004, the Presidium of the Supreme People's Assembly downgraded Nampo from a directly governed city (chikhalsi) to a normal city belonging to South Pyongan Province. For some time after this, Chollima-guyok, Kangso-guyok and Taean-guyok districts became counties (gun) of South Pyongan Province. By 2012, these counties were re-promoted to districts.

In 2010, the city was detached from South Pyongan Province, and the counties which were originally part of the city reassigned to it along with transferring administration of Onchon-gun to Nampo. Due to these changes, Nampo became the second largest city in North Korea.

In September 2020, a major uplifting of the city was completed, in accordance to the state policy of 'building local cities into distinctive towns'. This resulted in a seaside theme, with buildings mainly remodelled in blue, but also orange and browns. The strong local glass industry produced windows to glaze the apartment buildings. The supply of electricity, water and public transport was improved. As previously, the water supply was quoted to be 'insufficient' due to 'topographical conditions'.

== Economy ==
Nampo was originally a small fishing village that became a port for foreign trade in 1897, developing into a modern port in 1945 after World War II. With the rapid increase in state investment, the city's industrial capacity grew. Some of the city's industrial facilities include the city's Smelter Complex, Glass Corporation, Shipbuilding complex, Fishery Complex, and other central and local factories. Nampo is a center for the DPRK shipbuilding industry. North of the city are facilities for freight transportation, aquatic products, and fishery, and a sea salt factory. Apples grown in the city's Ryonggang county (룡강군) are a famous local product.

In a May 1981, Kim Il Sung drew up a plan for the city which included three goals:

- to be developed into an international port city
- to increase export volume and be developed into the largest trading port in the DPRK
- to develop into the largest industrial area in the west of North Korea and to have a focus on heavy industry

=== Farming ===
As the city is located on the Taedong River, the surrounding area is well suited to agriculture. Land reclamation occurs along the river and is used for rice growing. Before liberation, the economy was mainly agricultural at 97%, but was in a very backwards condition. This was made worse by the Japanese plundering the rice grown locally. After the foundation of North Korea, the conditions rapidly improved and it was transformed into a modern rural economy and fishery industry.

47.8% of the agricultural land are paddy fields, 40% are fields, 8.7% are orchards and 2.7% are Mulberry fields. The majority of fields sown are for grains, while around 20% is for vegetables. Various livestock are grown on cooperative farms, but also in private farms. The fishery industry in Nampo is one of the most important on the west coast.

=== Health ===
The main hospital in Nampo is the Nampho City People's Hospital, which underwent major reconstruction in 2020. The new hospital is reported to greatly enhance the quality of medical services provided by the hospital. It has a telemedicine link to hospitals in Pyongyang to further improve the medical care provided.

Other treatment facilities in the city include the Nampho City Koryo Medicine Hospital, Nampho City Maternity Hospital and the Waudo District People's Hospital.

=== Industry ===
Prior to liberation, the industry was fully committed to military needs to supply the Japanese imperialist ambition and was an important port for munitions transport. For convenience, the Japanese-built industries were clustered around what are now the districts of Waudo-guyok and Hunggu-guyok. Since then, Nampo has developed a strong economy with some industries in these areas being demolished and rebuilt in the corridor from Nampo to Pyongyang, such as in Chollima-guyok, Kangso-guyok or Taean-guyok.

The Nampo Smelting Complex is a key production complex and produces various copper products. It also smelts zinc and lead, although the zinc smelter was allegedly dismantled in 2001 due to pollution concerns. Four other important industries of the city are the Chollima Steel Complex, Taean Friendship Glass Factory, Kumsong Tractor Factory and Taean Heavy Machine Complex. Although the city also has a range of light industry, the major companies are all invested in various forms of heavy industry.

The position of the city has attracted foreign investment, an example being Pyeonghwa Motors, which was a joint venture between the Unification Church and the North Korean government, (Note: Now 100% controlled by the North Korean government after the death of the founder of Unification Church) where about 340 workers built cars from knock-down kits, mainly various Chinese cars and Fiats.

==== Defence ====
Nampo has an extensive shipbuilding capability, which along with cargo ships, also builds various warships. A submersible submarine-launched ballistic missile launch platform is based out of Nampo. The platform was first observed in 2017 and was likely operational in 2019, although in 2020 the platform was captured out of the water, possibly for repairs, as at the same time, the first platform in the Sinpho South Shipyard also underwent repairs.

A number of Hainan (Taechong) class patrol vessels, Osa (Soju)-class missile boats, Nongo class fast attack crafts, Komar-class missile boats, Nampo-class corvettes and a Najin-class frigate are based in Nampo.

==== Alleged uranium enrichment facility ====
In 2018, a report in The Diplomat claimed to have uncovered a Uranium enrichment facility in Chollima-guyok. A large building is said to contain the centrifuges for isotope separation and is surrounded by a wall, which according to the report, is a sign of a high security facility. The lack of snow on the roof of the building suggest that heat is being produced the entire year, and thus suggested that it is likely to be a uranium enrichment site.

However, these features are common in North Korea, and buildings with security fencing, on-site housing and monuments to the Kim family and are not proof of a uranium enrichment facility. The Korean People's Army brigades that were assigned to the nuclear program are fixed, unlike the shock troops deployed for hydroelectric power station or apartment construction and if they were moved to Nampo, there should be evident signs in satellite imagery, of which there were none. Similarly, the security at the facility is comparably low, being accessed on an open road off the Youth Hero Motorway and with few facilities for security personal onsite. In comparison, the nearby Chamjin Missile Factory (Tae-sung Machine Plant) has noticeably higher security; an actual enrichment facility at the Nyongbyon Nuclear Scientific Research Center has multiple gates and inspection posts and is in a significantly less exposed position.

== Administrative divisions ==
Nampo is divided into 5 guyŏk and 2 gun, which are in turn subdivided into dong and ri:

- Ch'ŏllima-guyŏk (천리마구역; 千里馬區域)
- Kangsŏ-guyŏk (강서구역; 江西區域)
- Hanggu-guyŏk (항구구역; 港口區域)
- Taean-guyŏk (대안구역; 大安區域)
- Waudo-guyŏk (와우도구역; 臥牛島區域)
- Ryonggang-gun (룡강군; 龍岡郡)
- Onch'ŏn-gun (온천군; 溫泉郡): in 2010 the following gun was merged into Nampo city.

== Demographics ==
According to the 2008 North Korea Census, a population of 366,815 lived in the city, (Note: Does not include Ryonggang County or Onchon County) of which 310,864 lived in urban areas and 55,951 lived in rural areas.

== Environment ==
=== Climate ===
Climate data for Nampo (1991–2020)
Month	Jan	Feb	Mar	Apr	May	Jun	Jul	Aug	Sep	Oct	Nov	Dec	Year
Mean daily maximum °C (°F)	−0.5 (31.1)	2.6 (36.7)	8.9 (48.0)	16.5 (61.7)	22.5 (72.5)	26.4 (79.5)	28.5 (83.3)	29.1 (84.4)	25.5 (77.9)	18.9 (66.0)	9.9 (49.8)	1.8 (35.2)	15.8 (60.4)
Daily mean °C (°F)	−4.4 (24.1)	−1.7 (28.9)	3.9 (39.0)	10.8 (51.4)	16.7 (62.1)	21.2 (70.2)	24.3 (75.7)	24.8 (76.6)	20.4 (68.7)	13.7 (56.7)	5.7 (42.3)	−1.8 (28.8)	11.1 (52.0)
Mean daily minimum °C (°F)	−7.9 (17.8)	−5.4 (22.3)	0.0 (32.0)	6.4 (43.5)	12.4 (54.3)	17.7 (63.9)	21.4 (70.5)	21.7 (71.1)	16.6 (61.9)	9.5 (49.1)	2.0 (35.6)	−5.0 (23.0)	7.5 (45.5)
Average precipitation mm (inches)	9.2 (0.36)	12.9 (0.51)	17.3 (0.68)	36.8 (1.45)	67.0 (2.64)	82.0 (3.23)	202.2 (7.96)	166.2 (6.54)	72.4 (2.85)	38.5 (1.52)	38.8 (1.53)	19.6 (0.77)	762.9 (30.04)
Average precipitation days (≥ 0.1 mm)	4.2	3.5	3.7	5.0	6.5	7.0	10.8	8.2	5.5	5.3	6.8	6.0	72.5
Average snowy days	5.2	3.2	1.6	0.1	0.0	0.0	0.0	0.0	0.0	0.0	2.1	5.6	17.8
Average relative humidity (%)	72.1	70.0	69.2	66.6	71.1	78.4	85.8	84.6	77.2	72.4	73.6	72.5	74.5
Source: Korea Meteorological Administration

=== Geography ===
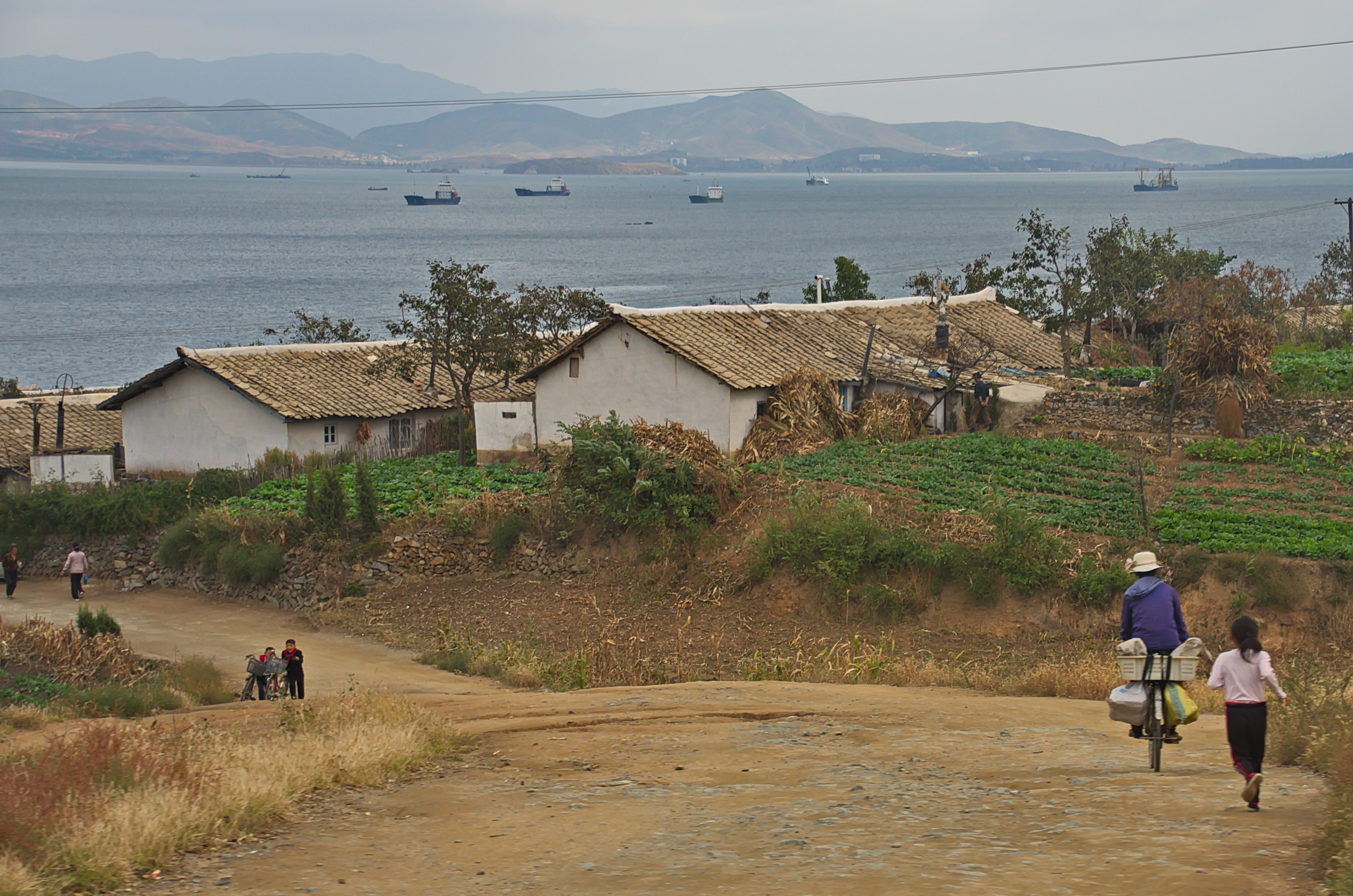
Countryside of Nampo, by the Taedong River

Nampo is located on the west coast of Korea, and is mostly low-lying with 82% of the city below 50 metres elevation. There are mountains mostly in the south and east, which are generally below 100 metres above sea level, forming a wavy plain. The highest points in the city are on the Osok mountain range, with Osok-san at 566 m and Guksabong at 506 m. The many rivers and streams flowing through the city provide good conditions for agriculture. Underneath the city, there are iron, manganese, titanium along with other precious metals, including gold and silver.

=== Natural environment ===
Around 5,000 birds visit the Kumsong tideland and 76,000 waterbirds visit the lake created by the West Sea Barrage, which includes a number of endangered and vulnerable birds.

== Transportation ==
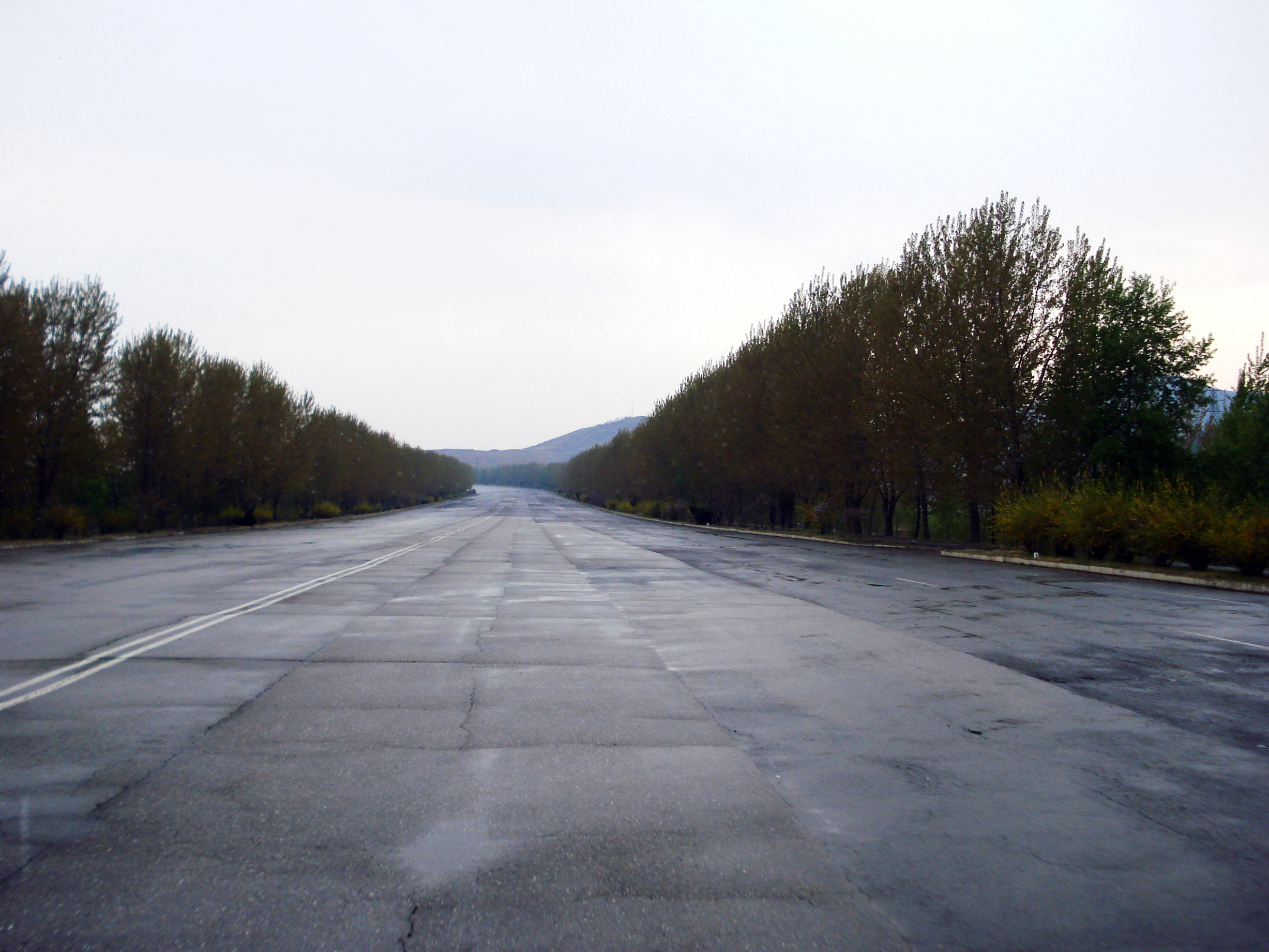
The 'Youth Hero Motorway' connecting Pyongyang to Nampo

=== Road ===
The Youth Hero Motorway, completed in October 2000 connects Nampo to Pyongyang. The motorway was built mainly by younger people, and hence the road was renamed in commemoration of their efforts from Pyongyang-Nampo Motorway to the Youth Hero Motorway.

==== Public transport ====
Nampo has a trolleybus system which opened around 1982. The system has a main line, running from Nampo Stadium to the northeast of the city and a branch from the main line to the west of the city, near the salt pans. The branch could be only served from the direction of the stadium, and was in poor condition with the overhead line no longer stretched with it not being used at least since 2011. In 2015, the service was reported intermittently operated if at all, and only on weekdays. Operation was returned to normal from 24 August 2021, when the city authorities declared a push to improve transport, which included normalising the trolleybus service. As part of this push, around 20 derelict buses were repaired and brought back into service.

In November 2015, a solar panel electric bus developed by the science and technological committee of Nampo was tested in the city. It is powered by 32 100-watt solar panels charging 50 Taedonggang Batteries and powering a 95 kW DC motor to carry up to 140 passengers at 40 km/h and is part of the effort to alleviate the energy shortages in North Korea.

Tarkhov, Sergei and Dmitriy Merzlov. "North Korean Surprises - Part 3". (Trolleybus Magazine No. 246, November–December 2002).

=== Air ===
The only airport in Nampo is the military Onch'ŏn Air Base in Onch'ŏn-gun.

=== Rail ===
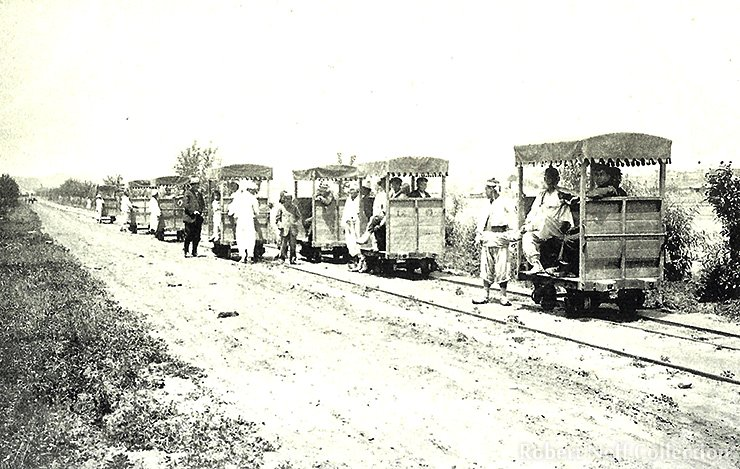
Chinampo-Pyongyang Railway

The first rail line in Korea was built connecting Pyongyang and Chinnampo in 1895 by the Japanese military. It was an 88 km line with cars that were man-powered and running on 530 mm (21 in) tracks but was dismantled not long after it began operation.

The greater Nampo area is densely served by the Korean State Railway, with a number of stations on the P'yŏngnam Line, the entirety of the Ryonggang, Sŏhaekammun, Posan, Nampohang and Taean lines, and one station on the Ŭllyul Line being located inside the boundaries of Namp'o-t'ŭkpyŏlsi. Branches off the Pyongnam line at Nampo station specifically serve the Nampo Smelting Complex and Nampo Electrode Factory.

=== Water ===
==== River ====
With the city sitting on the Taedong River, river transport is a significant form of transport. Passenger ships run from Nampo Port to Sohae-ri, Songrim, Unchon County and Pyongyang. Cruise ships run between Waudo and the West Sea Barrage, and between Waudo and Mangyongdae.

==== Sea ====
The West Sea Barrage of the port of Nampo, built by erecting an 8-km long sea wall, has three lock chambers which allow the passage of ships up to 50,000 tons, and 36 sluices. Nampo Harbour is often used as the primary port of call for receiving foreign food aid assistance into North Korea. The port of Nampo has modern harbour facilities that can accommodate ships of 20,000 tonnes but is frozen during the winter. Nampo serves as Pyongyang's port on the Yellow Sea. Contrary to most ports, containers that are offloaded at the port are not transported; instead, the contents are removed and transported by cargo trucks, while the containers remain at the port, waiting for goods to be shipped out.

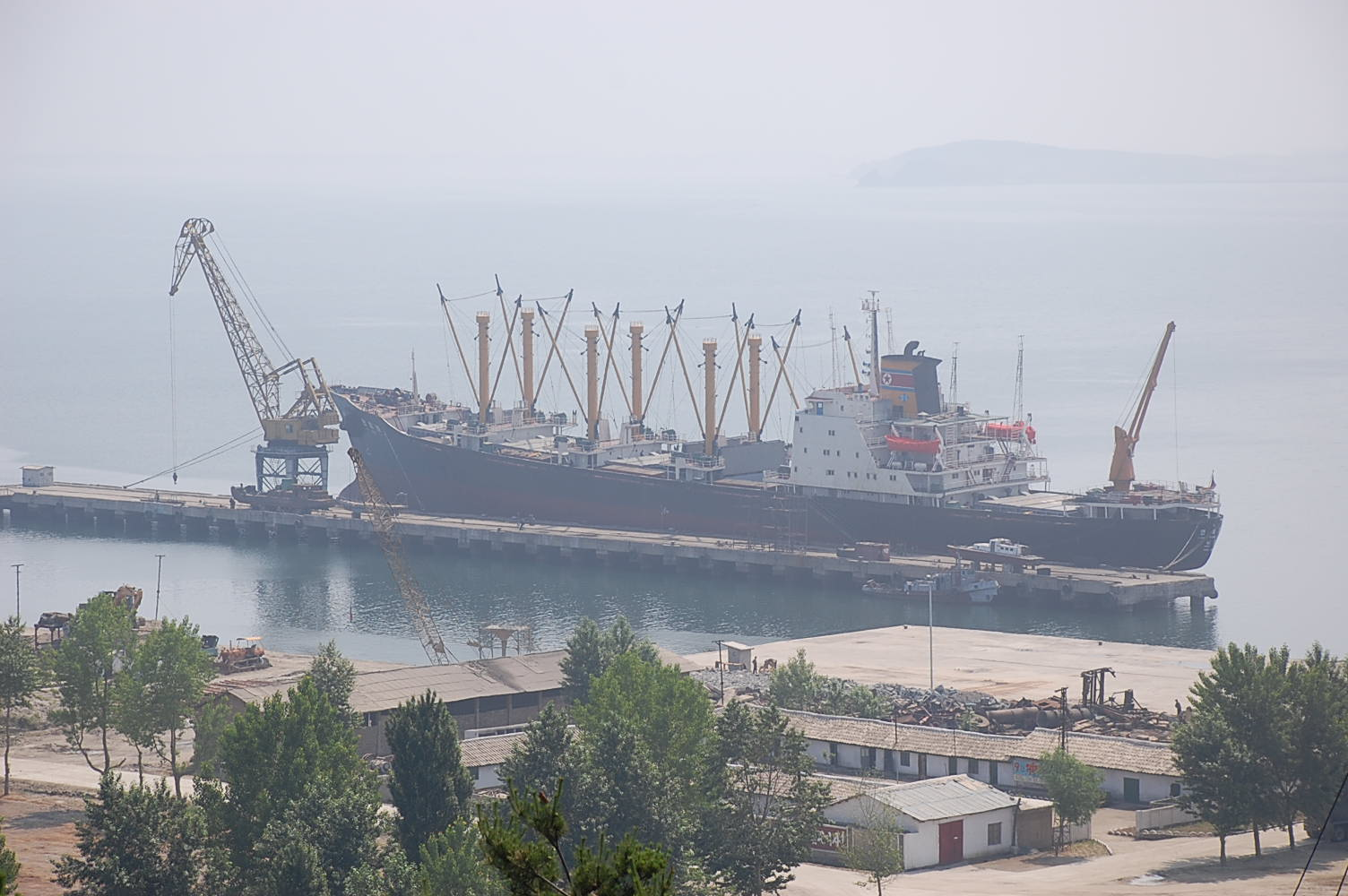
A cargo ship at Nampo port

In 2008, the harbour received several batches of grain delivery; the first batch delivered in June was sent by the United States and weighed 38,000 tons. A South Korean-based relief organisation, Join Together Society, donated one batch of flour in October of the same year weighing approximately 500 tons.

Vehicle transport ships carry trucks between Nampo port and South Hwanghae Province through the West Sea Barrage, which saves time and fuel from driving a longer distance to the province.

During the COVID-19 pandemic, there was a noticeable decrease in traffic at the Nampo Coal Port, with just a few or no ships visible. Two tanks for petroleum or oil were finally built in 2020 after the bases were completed in 2016, while the other bases for the tanks remains unused. A separate oil terminal also started construction in 2020, including a new offshore wharf. Walls were built with shipping containers which marked a path to the warehouses and divided the port into cargo storage areas, although the purpose is not known but possibly related to COVID-19. The port mainly handles trade of concrete and coal.

== Culture ==
=== Education ===
Institutes of higher learning in Nampo include

- Nampo University
- Sŏhae University
- Samgwang College
- Sunhwa College
- Nampho College of Medical Sciences
- Nampho University of Agriculture
- Nampo College of Shipping Industry
- Nampo Building Materials College
- Nampo University of Fisheries
- Kangson College of Engineering
- Nampho University of Education

=== Historical relics ===
Parts of the World Cultural Heritage listed Koguryo tombs are located in Ryonggang County, dating to the 5th century which provides much information on the study of the social, architectural, painting and castles of the Koguryo dynasty. Although most of the murals have faded away, a portrait and a map are still present on the south walls.

An early Koryo Dynasty era granite Buddhist image was unearthed by the Kim Il Sung University and Academy of Social Sciences and registered to the list of national treasures in 2019. Various other artefacts were also unearthed along with it, such as iron arrowheads, metallic currency and pottery. It appears to depict Bhaisajyaguru (Note: Yaksayorae in Korean) as it is holding a gallipot with both hands.

The Hwangnyong Fortress was built during Koguryo and repaired in year 919 under the Koryo Dynasty. The original purpose was to defend Pyongyang from invaders in the southwest. The peaks in the north, east, south and west of the fort are used as observation posts during peacetime and can be used as command posts during wartime.

There are three historical tombs in Nampo, all dating to the Goguryeo dynasty.

== Notable people from Nampo ==
- No Kwang-chol, North Korean general and politician (Workers' Party of Korea)
- Kim Kil-hak, composer, with title of People's Artist.

== Sister cities ==
- Saint Petersburg, Russia
- Chiautempan, Mexico
- Loja, Ecuador
- Lisbon, Portugal
- List of cities in North Korea
- Geography of North Korea
