= Korean People's Army Air Force =

Air warfare branch of North Korea's military

- 조선인민군 공군
- Patch of the Korean People's Army Air Force
- Founded: November 29, 1945; 80 years ago
- Country: North Korea
- Allegiance: Workers' Party of Korea
- Type: Air force Space force
- Role: Aerial warfare; Aerial defence; Space warfare
- Size: 110,000 active personnel; 950 aircraft; 1 satellite
- Part of: Korean People's Army
- Headquarters: Pyongyang
- March: "비행사의 노래" (English: Song of Pilots)
- Engagements: Korean War; Vietnam War; Yom Kippur War

Commanders
- Commander: General Kim Kwang-hyok
- Notable commanders: Vice Marshal Cho Myong-rok; Colonel-General Oh Gum-chol

Insignia
- Roundel

- Flag: Front: Back:

Aircraft flown
- Attack: Su-25
- Bomber: Harbin H-5
- Fighter: Shenyang J-5, Shenyang J-6, Chengdu F-7, MiG-21, MiG-23, MiG-29
- Helicopter: MD 500, Mi-2, Mi-8, Mi-14, Mi-24, Mi-26
- Reconnaissance: Saetbyol-4, Saetbyol-9
- Trainer: FT-2, FT-5
- Transport: An-24, PAC P-750, An-2

Korean name
- Hangul: 조선인민군 공군
- Hanja: 朝鮮人民軍空軍
- RR: Joseon inmingun gonggun
- MR: Chosŏn inmin'gun konggun

The Korean People's Army Air Force (KPAF; Korean: 조선인민군 공군; MR: chosŏninmin'gun konggun) is the unified military aviation force of North Korea. It is the second largest branch of the Korean People's Army comprising an estimated 110,000 members. As of 2024, it is estimated to possess some 570 combat aircraft, 200 helicopters, and a few transport and logistics aircraft, mostly of decades-old Soviet and Chinese origin. Its primary task is to defend North Korean airspace. In April 2022, the Korean People's Army Air and Anti-Air Force name was changed to Korean People's Army Air Force.

== History ==
=== Early years (1945–1949) ===
The Korean People's Army Air Force began as the "Korean Aviation Society (조선 항공대)" in 1945. It was organized along the lines of flying clubs in the Soviet Union. In 1946, the society became a military organization and became an aviation division of the Korean People's Army (KPA). It became a branch of the army in its own right in November 1948. Training personnel for what was now known as the "Korean People's Air Force Air Corps" was a major hurdle, with the Soviets reporting in May 1950 that of the 120 trained pilots, only 32 were combat qualified. The only experienced pilots in North Korea before this were those who flew for the IJAAF. These pilots were however rejected by society and the regime. Nevertheless, on June 25, 1950, the KPAF started flying support missions for the Invasion of South Korea.

=== Korean War: Invasion of South Korea and UN Offensive (June – November 1950) ===
During the early period of the war, the Il-10 Beasts were the main bombers used in the strikes against airfields in South Korea, while Yak-9/9P Franks as well as other trainer and fighter aircraft were used in Close Air Patrol and Strafing attacks. North Korea's Air Force also at that time had many Japanese aircraft including a Ki-54 transport. Only one encounter with USAF aircraft occurred when two unknown North Korean aircraft attacked two F-82 Twin Mustangs. The KPAF aircraft were out of range and thus failed to score any kills.

On June 27, a USAF F-82 shot down a Yak-11 Trainer that was escorted by four Yak-9s. On the 29th, after Seoul fell, a strike was conducted on Suwon Airfield by 3 Il-10s and 6 Yak-9s, destroying an American C-54 Skymaster on the ground. A second strike on Suwon was however intercepted by F-80C Shooting Stars.

Throughout July and August, the KPAF continued in supporting the ground offensive near the Pusan Perimeter. During that time, they came into increasing contact with USAF and USN jet aircraft, resulting in more losses.

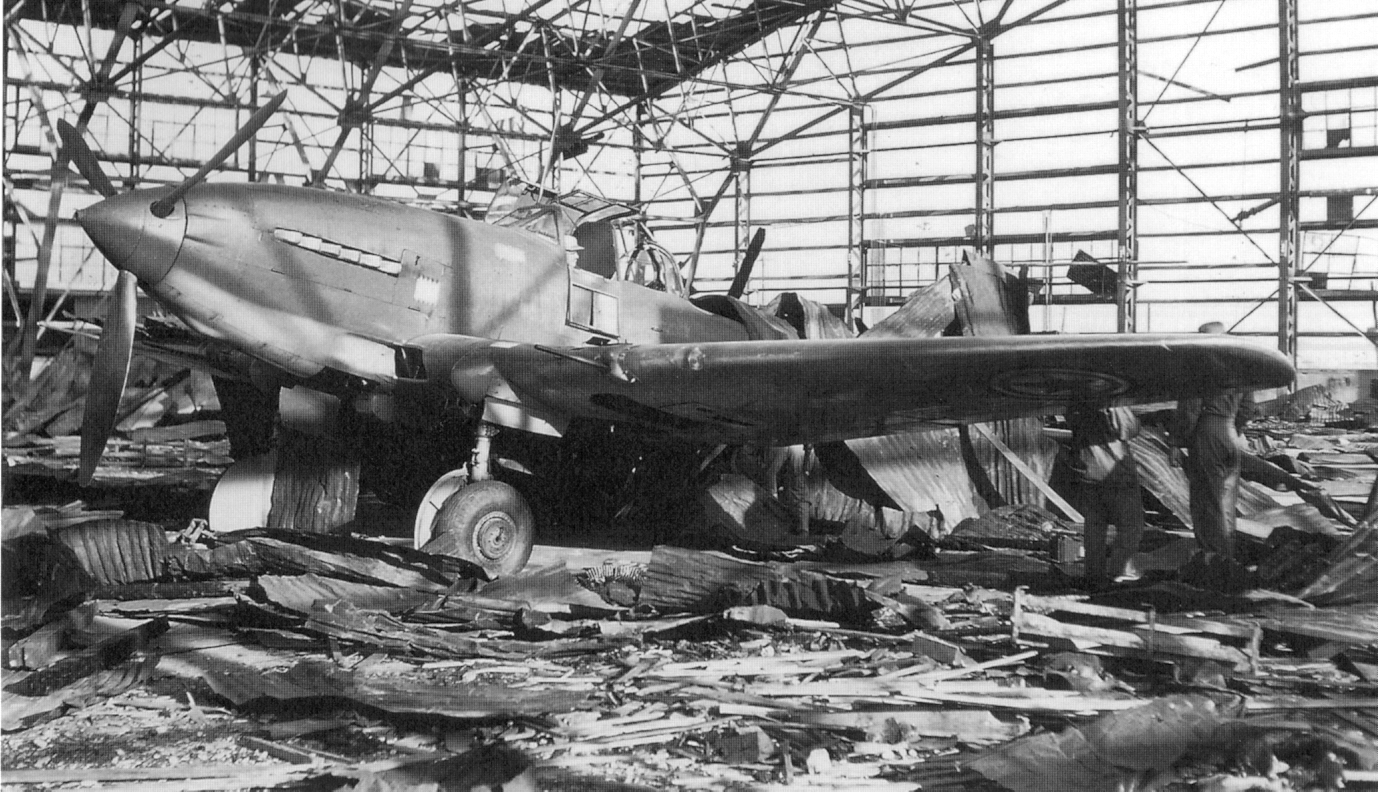
An abandoned NKPAF Ilyushin Il-10 captured by UN forces at Kimpo Airfield in September 1950.

During the first-ever strike by carrier-borne jet aircraft on July 3, 1950, VF-51, from USS Valley Forge CV-45, claimed the first kill by a naval jet when an F9F-3 Panther shot down a KPAF Yak-9P. On that day, many KPAF Yak-9Ps were caught on the ground scrambling, with many reportedly taking off towards each other. In the end, the Pyongyang, Pyongyang East and Onjong-Ni Airfields (which were targeted in the strike), were hit successfully while the KPAF lost many of their aircraft. At the same time, USAF B-29 Superfortresses, P-80Cs, F-51 Mustangs and A-26 Invaders began to attack ground targets inside North Korea, encountering very little resistance from the KPAF.

Soviet sources reported that the KPAF was no longer operating after August 10 and was finally wiped out by a strike by USN aircraft on August 22. For their part, the KPAF only shot down 3 US aircraft in air combat (a B-29, an L-4 and an L-5). On November 6, 1950, two Yak-9Ps were shot down by F-51Ds from 67th FBS became the last KPAF propeller aircraft lost.

=== Reorganization (November 1950–1953) ===
After the heavy losses encountered in July and August 1950, the Soviets began to train the North Koreans to fly the MiG-15 Fagot, although the Soviets were the first to fly the MiG against the UN Forces. Although many North Korean pilots were experienced when they flew the MiG-15, the Soviets admitted that most were highly inexperienced.

=== Post-Korean War ===
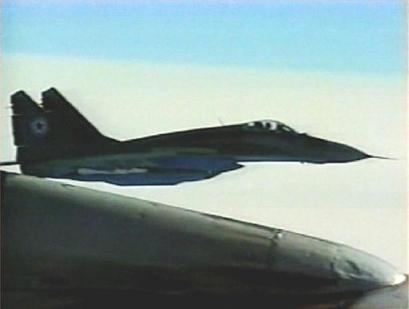
A KPAAF Mikoyan MiG-29 intercepting a US Lockheed P-3 Orion, 2003, photographed by the US crew.

The Korean People's Army would continue to receive new generations of Soviet fighters throughout the mid-late 1950s and into the early 1960s, culminating in the receipt of the first MiG-21s which arrived in 1963, and possibly earlier. During hostilities in the Korean Demilitarized Zone later that decade, Korean People's Army Air Force MiG-21s were credited with shooting down an American RF-4C Phantom reconnaissance plane on August 31, 1967, an F-105D fighter five months later on January 14, 1968 and an F-4B fighter the following month on February 12. On January 23, 1968 a pair of MiG-21 fighters were involved in the first stages of the joint operation with the Korean People's Army Navy to capture the American surveillance ship USS Pueblo.

The KPAAF has on occasion deployed abroad. It deployed a fighter squadron to North Vietnam during the Vietnam War. Kim Il Sung reportedly told the North Korean pilots "to fight in the war as if the Vietnamese sky were their own."

North Korean personnel manned one MiG-21 company and two Mig-17 companies in the North Vietnamese fleet, providing a 50 percent increase to North Vietnam's fighter strength. Between 87 and 96 North Korean pilots served in the conflict, and were credited by North Vietnamese pilots with downing 26 American aircraft while taking 14 losses.

On April 15, 1969, MiG-21s of the KPAF shot down a Lockheed EC-121 Warning Star in international waters, in the Sea of Japan. In 1973, a North Korean flight of MiG-21s deployed to Bir Arida Air Base to help defend southern Egypt during the Yom Kippur War. The unit had four to six encounters with the Israelis from August through the end of the war. According to Shlomo Aloni, the last aerial engagement on the Egyptian front, which took place on 6 December, saw Israeli Air Force F-4s engage North Korean-piloted MiG-21s. The Israelis shot down one MiG and another was shot down by friendly fire from Egyptian air defenses. KPAAF pilots continued to fly Syrian MiG-21s throughout the 1970s and into the 1980s.

The KPAAF has received over 500 aircraft from China between 1956 and 1981, such as 100 units of Shenyang J-6 fighter jets in 1971, 18 units of Harbin H-5 medium bombers, 40 units of Harbin Z-5 transport helicopters between 1974 and 1975, an additional 30 units of J-6 in 1978, and 40 units of Chengdu J-7 in 1981.

In 1990–91, North Korea activated four forward air bases near the Korean Demilitarized Zone (DMZ).

== Organization ==
=== Capabilities ===
According to a 2021 report from the US Defense Intelligence Agency, the most modern assets of the KPAF are the MiG-29 and MiG-23, while the Su-25 ground attack and Ilyushin Il-28 bomber aircraft are also deemed by the DIA as having some capability. The KPAF also maintains obsolete types including the MiG-15, MiG-17, MiG-19, and MiG-21. The DIA assesses that the North Koreans would be unable to prevail in combat against US forces "overwhelming advantages in power projection, strategic air superiority, and precision-guided standoff strike capability," and would face "considerable difficulty" against South Korean air defences, relying mostly on Antonov An-2 transports for inserting special forces into South Korea and UAVs for intelligence gathering and supplementing the air force ground attack capabilities.

In 2024, Admiral Samuel Paparo, commander of the United States Indo-Pacific Command told reporters that North Korea is set to receive MiG-29 and Su-27 from Russia in exchange for troops for its invasion of Ukraine. Paparo also stated that while these are older fourth-generation fighters, they're still "formidable". The War Zone states that while it's unlikely that Russia will be able to transfer these aircraft on a short-term at least (with the Russian aerospace industry busy keeping the Russian Air Force fleets operational during the war in Ukraine), the delivery of these aircraft would provide a "modest − but badly needed − modernization" for the KPAF.

In 2025, MiG 29 has launched air to air missile resembling AIM-7 Sparrow and PL-11 during air drills on May 15 along two types of Glide bombs and air to air missile resembling AIM-120 AMRAAM and PL-12 were shown next to parked MiG-29.

North Korea operates a wide variety of air defense equipment, from short-range MANPADS such as 9K34 Strela-3, 9K38 Igla and ZPU-4 heavy machine guns, high-altitude upgraded S-75 Dvina, to long-range SA-5 Gammon and Pongae-5 SAM systems and large-calibre AA artillery guns. North Korea has one of the densest air defence networks in the world. Ilyushin Il-28 Beagle bombers provide a medium-range attack platform, despite being generally obsolete, although it is likely they have the ability to launch Kh-35 and P-15 Termit missiles. A large part of the ground attack aircraft are kept in heavily fortified hangars, some of which are capable of withstanding a nearby nuclear blast. Stealth capacity is known in the KPAF through researching in radar-absorbing paint and inventory deception.

It has been noted that the North Korean Air Force operates a few MD-500 helicopters that were exported to North Korea by West German merchants through Soviet vessels in the 1980s. Several were seen equipped with Soviet AT-3 anti-tank missiles during a military parade commemorating 60 years since Korean War armistice. They later made another public appearance at the Wonsan Air Festival in which they were seen sporting the new green camouflage paint scheme that has also been incorporated on An-2s and Mi-17s that have also been displayed at the air show.

The KPAAF possesses precision guided munitions such as Kh-25 and Kh-29 air to ground missiles along jamming pods such as SPS-141 for SAM suppression. At least some of Il-28's/H-5's bombers are capable of launching air launched variant of Kumsong-3 anti-ship cruise missiles with known flight tests done in 2008 and 2011. Ground launched coastal defense variant of Kumsong-3 has range of 240 kilometers. The KPAF still incorporates many of the original Soviet air tactics, as well as North Korean experience from the UN bombings during the Korean War.

== Personnel ==
From 1978 to 1995, General Jo Myong-rok was the commander of the air force. In October 1995, he was promoted to vice-marshal and appointed Chief of the KPA General Political Bureau and a member of the Korean Workers' Party Central Military Committee. His place as commander of the Air Force was taken by Colonel General O Kum-chol.

=== Annual flying hours ===
Due to North Korea's isolation, concrete figures on annual flying hours are unknown, with estimates per pilot for the KPAF are said to be only 15 or 25 hours per pilot each year - comparable to the flying hours of air forces in ex-Soviet countries in the early 1990s. In comparison, most NATO fighter pilots fly at least 150 hours a year.

Agence France-Presse reported on January 23, 2012, that the KPAF had conducted more flight training than average in 2011.

The Chosun Ilbo reported on March 29, 2012, that the KPAF had dramatically increased the number of flights to 650 per day.

Tongil News reported on July 20, 2013, that the KPAF's fighter jets and helicopters had conducted 700 sorties a day for 11 days as reported by a source in the South Korean government on March 13 after the Key Resolve military exercise started on March 11. Seven hundred hours of sorties is considered by the United States military as the capability to wage all-out war.

== Structure ==
Korean People's Army Air Force Air Bases.

Following is a list of bases where North Korean Army Air Force aircraft are permanently based.

=== Air bases ===
Northwestern area (1st Air Combat Division, HQ Kaechon)

Base	Location	Units	Notes
Uiju Airfield	Uiju County 40°08′59″N 124°29′53″E	24th Bomber Regiment	Il-28 (Harbin H-5s)
Panghyon Naamsi	39°55′57.517″N 125°12′24.804″E	49th Fighter Regiment	F-5A(MiG-17F)
Taechon Airfield	39°54′12″N 125°29′13″E	5th Air Transport Wing	
Kaech'on Airfield	39°44′45″N 125°53′43″E	HQ, 1st Air Combat Command 35th Fighter Regiment	HQ MiG-19/J-6. Fighter base with 2500 m runway.
Pukch'ang Airport	39°29′50″N 125°58′32″E	60th Air Fighter Wing (1 ACC) Air Transport Wing (5 TD)	MiG-23ML/MiG-23UB/Mig-29Bs/MiG-29SEs/MiG-15UTI/Mig-21 H500D/H500E/500D. This base was where most new Soviet fighter aircraft were delivered during the 1960s.
Samjangkol		Air Transport Wing (6 TD)	Mi-2
Sunchon Airport	South Pyongan Province 39°24′43″N 125°53′25″E	55th Air Fighter Wing (1 ACC)	Su-25K/ MiG-29/MiG-29UB
Kanch'on		Air Transport Wing (6 TD)	Mi-4/Z-5/Mi-8/Mi-17/Mi-2

West Coast and Pyongyang area (1st Air Combat Division) - HQ: Kaechon

Pyongyang is also the location of HQ, KPAAF

- Uiju - 24th Air Regiment {Bomber} (H-5/Il-28, MiG-21PFM)
- Kaechon - 35th Air Regiment {Fighter} (J-6/MiG-19)
- Onchon - 36th Air Regiment {Fighter} (J-6/MiG-19)
- Sunchon - 55th Air Regiment {Attack} (Su-25K), 57th Air Regiment {Fighter} (MiG-29/UB)
- Panghyon - 49th Air Regiment {Fighter Bomber} (J-5/MiG-17F, MiG-21PFM, Mi-2)
- Pukchang - 58th Air Regiment {Fighter} (MiG-23ML/UM), 60th Air Regiment {Fighter Bomber} (MiG-21Bis), ?? Air Regiment {Fighter} (MIG-29)

West coast and Pyongyang area (5th Transport Division) - HQ: Taechon

- Taechon - ?? Air Regiment {Transport} (Y-5/An-2)
- Kwaksan - ?? Air Regiment {Transport} (Y-5/An-2)
- Kangdong - ?? Air Regiment {Bomber} (CJ-6/BT-6)
- Sonchon - ?? Air Regiment {Helicopter} (Mi-2)
- Pukchang East - 65th Air Regiment {Helicopter} (Mi-8T, Mi-26), 64th Air Regiment {Helicopter} (MD-500)
- Pyongyang Sunan Intl - Special Service Air Transport Wing (KPAAF-CAAK) (Air Koryo) (Tu-134B/Tu-154B-2/Il-62M/Il-76MD/Il-18/An-24/An-148)
- Mirim Airfield - ?? VIP Unit (Mi-17) This base serves as a light transport base and closed sometime in the 1990s, now used as a KPA training facility.

DMZ area (3rd Air Combat Division) - HQ: Hwangju

- Chunghwa - Headquarters, Air Defense and Combat Command
- Taetan - 4th Air Regiment {Fighter Bomber} (J-5/MiG-17F, MiG-21PFM, Mi-2)
- Nuchon-ni - 32nd Air Regiment {Fighter Bomber} (J-5/MiG-17, MiG-21PFM, Mi-2)
- Kwail - 33rd Air Regiment {Fighter Bomber} (J-5/MiG-17F), 11th Air Regiment {Fighter Bomber} (J-5/MiG-17F)
- Hwangju - 50th Air Regiment {Fighter} (MiG-21PFM)
- Ayang-ni - 63rd Air Regiment {Attack Helicopter} (Mi-24D)

East Coast area (2nd Air Combat Division) - HQ: Toksan

- Toksan - 56th Air Regiment {Fighter}(MiG-21PF/J-7/F-7)
- Chanjin-Up - 25th Air Regiment {Bomber} (Il-28/H-5); ??th Air Regiment {Fighter} (MiG-21PFM)
- Wonsan - 46th Air Regiment {Fighter}(MiG-21PFM, F-5), 66th Air Regiment {Helicopter} (Mi-14PL)
- Kuum Ni - 71st Air Regiment {Fighter}(MiG-21PFM)
- Hwangsuwon - 72nd Air Regiment {Fighter}(MiG-21PFM)

East Coast area (6th Transport Division) - HQ: Sondok

- Sondok - ?? Air Regiment {Transport} (Y-5/An-2)
- Yonpo - ?? Air Regiment {Transport} (Y-5/An-2)
- Manpo - ?? Air Regiment {Transport} (Y-5/An-2)
- Kuktong - ?? Air Regiment {Transport} (Y-5/An-2)
- Kowon - Air Transport Wing (6 TD) (Z-5/Mi-4/Mi-8/Mi-17)
- Pakhon - Air Transport Wing (6 TD) (Z-5/Mi-4/Mi-8/Mi-17/Mi-2)

Far Northeast area (8th Training Division) - HQ: Orang

- Samiyon Airfield - ?? Training Regiment (F-5A)
- Hyesan Airfield - unknown unit
- Kilchu West + East - ?? Air Regiment {Helicopter Training} (Mi-2)
- Orang - 41st Air Regiment {Fighter Training}(MiG-15UTI/J-2/MiG-15)
- Sungam-Chonhjin - Kimchaek Air Force Academy (BT-6)
- Kyongsong - Flight Officers School (BT-6)
- Kang Da Ri Airfield - Underground runway near Wonsan, under construction.
- Tongchŏn Airfield - (MiG-21PF/J-7/F-7)
- Inhung - Helipads (Mi-8/Ka-27 (possibly Ka-28/Ka-29/Ka-32)) (39°31′55″N 127°22′29″E)
- Hamhŭng Airfield - (MiG-21PF/J-7/F-7)
- Sungam Airfield - Air Transport Wing (Y-5/An-2)
- Riwon north Airfield - (MiG-15UTI/J-2/MiG-15)

== Aircraft ==
=== Current inventory ===
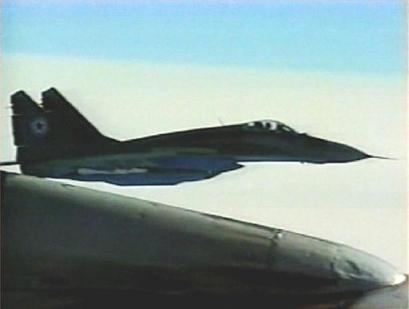
A North Korean MiG-29 in 2003

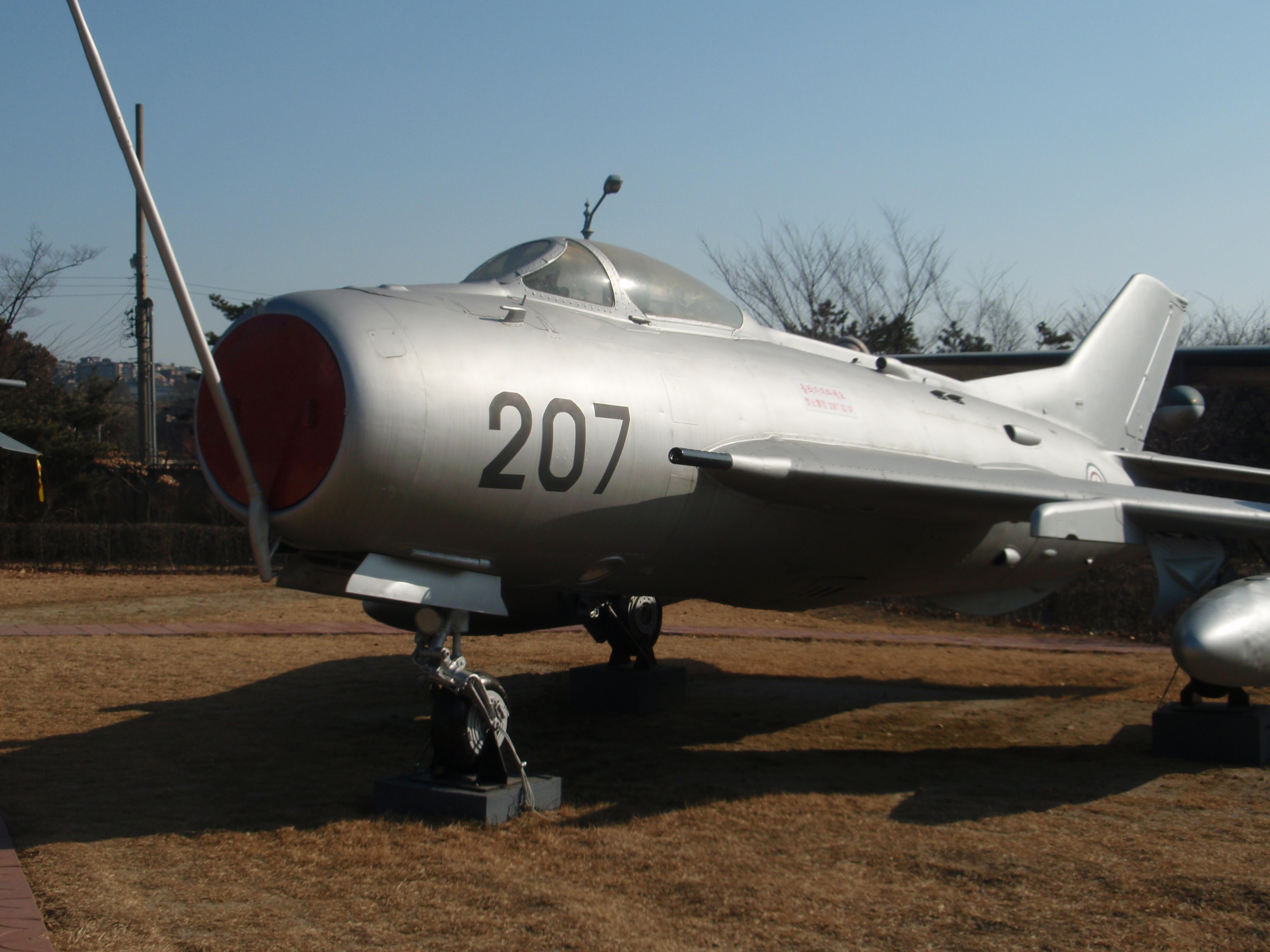
A North Korean Shenyang J-6

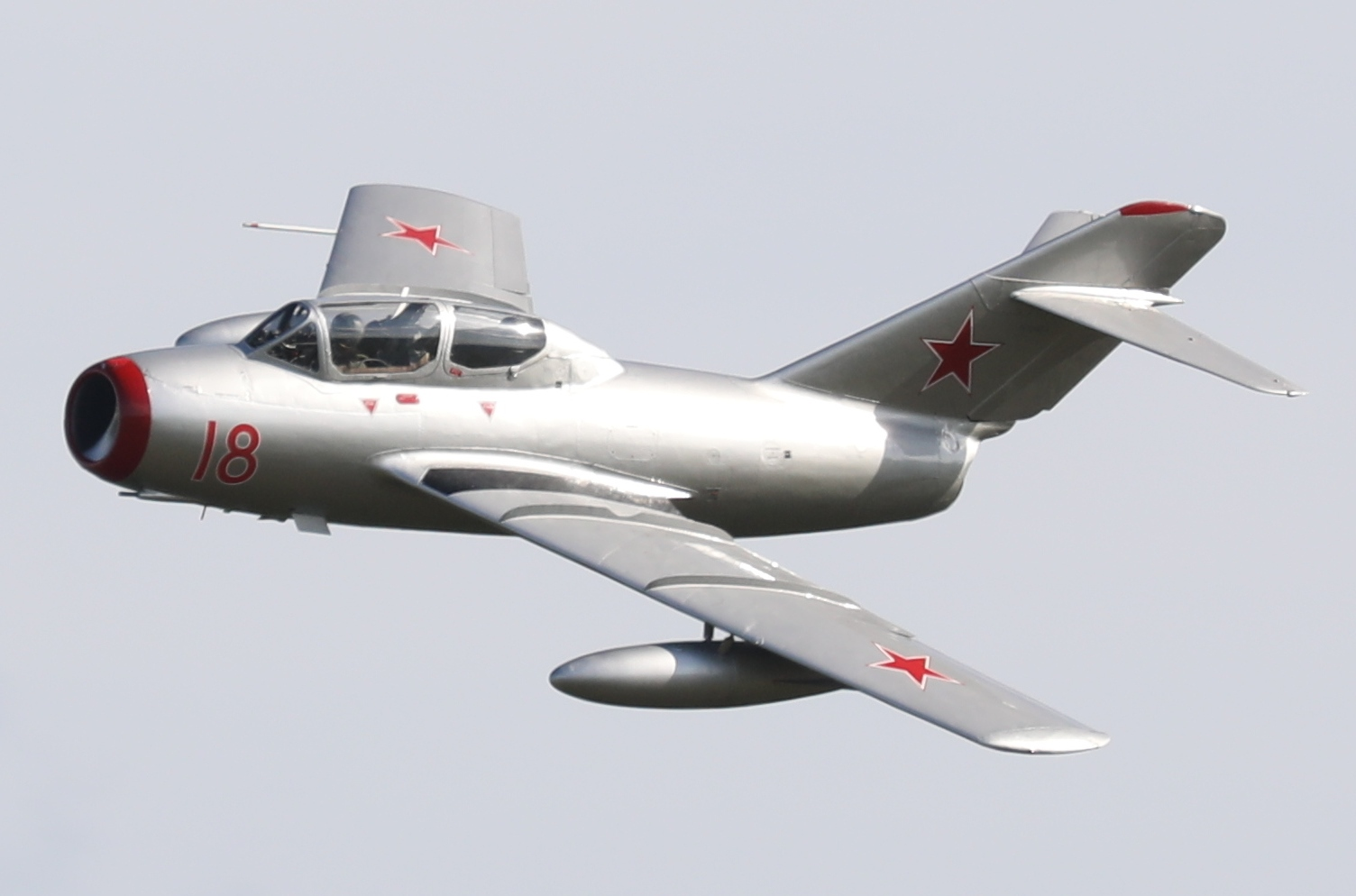
The FT-2 is a Chinese built MiG-15 similar to this one

Aircraft	Origin	Type	Variant	In service	Notes
Combat aircraft
MiG-21	Soviet Union	Fighter	F/ PFM/ bis	26	
MiG-29	Soviet Union	Multirole	B/S	35	
MiG-23	Soviet Union	Fighter-bomber	MF/MS/ML	56	
Sukhoi Su-25	Soviet Union	Attack	K	34	
Ilyushin Il-28	Soviet Union	Medium Bomber	H-5	80	Chinese-built variant designated the H-5. 36 aircraft are operational.
Shenyang F-5	China	Fighter		106	derivative of the MiG-17F
Shenyang J-6	China	Fighter	F-6C	97	license built MiG-19S
Chengdu J-7	China	Fighter	F-7I	30	license built MiG-21F-13
AWACS
Il-76TD	Russia & North Korea	AEW&C	indigenous conversion	1	Equipped with a AESA radar
Transport
PAC P-750	New Zealand	Transport		3	illegally imported via China
An-2	Soviet Union	Utility		270+	
Antonov An-24	Soviet Union	Heavy Transport	B/RV	1	
Helicopters
PZL Mi-2	Polish People's Republic	Utility	T	48	
Harbin Z-5	China	Utility		48	
Mil Mi-8	Soviet Union	Utility	T/TV/MT Mi-17	41	
Mil Mi-14	Soviet Union	ASW / SAR	PL/BT	8	
Mil Mi-24	Soviet Union	Attack	D/P Mi-35	20	
Mil Mi-26	Soviet Union	Transport	T	4	
MD Helicopters MD 500	United States	Light Utility	D	84	illegally obtained by circumventing U.S. export controls
Trainer aircraft
MiG-15	Soviet Union	Jet Trainer	UTI	4	
Shenyang F-5	China	Jet Trainer	FT-5	135	
Sukhoi Su-25	Soviet Union	Attack	UBK	34	
Shenyang FT-2	China	Jet Trainer		30	Chinese produced MiG-15UTI
UAV
Tupolev Tu-143	Soviet Union	Surveillance			obtained from Syria
Yakovlev Pchela	Russia	Reconnaissance		10	
Saetbyol-4	North Korea	Reconnaissance			Copy of RQ-4 Global Hawk
Saetbyol-9	North Korea	Multi-purpose Attack			Copy of MQ-9 Reaper

=== Armament ===
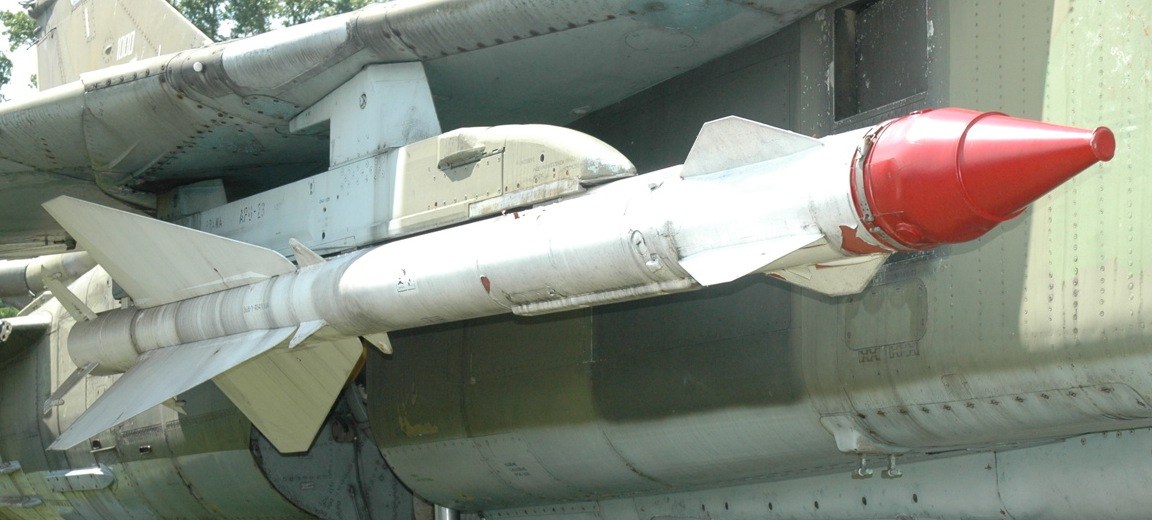
The KPAAF use the R-23 missile similar to this one

Name	Origin	Type	Inventory
Air-to-air missile
K-13	Soviet Union	air-to-air missile	1050 missiles
R-23	Soviet Union	air-to-air missile	250 missiles
R-27	Soviet Union	air-to-air missile	60 medium range missiles
Unnamed medium-range air to air missile	North Korea	air-to-air missile	N/A
R-60	Soviet Union	air-to-air missile	190 missiles
R-73	Soviet Union	air-to-air missile	
KN-05	Russia / North Korea	air-launched cruise missile	
AGP-250	North Korea	glide bomb	250 kg GNSS guided bomb

=== Air defence ===
Name	Origin	Type	In service	Notes
SAM
S-75	Soviet Union	SAM system	1950 missiles	
S-125	Soviet Union	SAM system	300 missiles	
S-200	Soviet Union	SAM system	75 missiles	
Pongae-5	North Korea	SAM system	Unknown quantity of missiles	Based on S-300 PMU/PMU-1
Pyoljji-1-2	North Korea	SAM system		
KN-13	Soviet Union / North Korea	SAM system		S-75 with infrared seeker.

=== Military satellites ===
Name	Origin	Type	In service	Notes
Reconnaissance satellites
Malligyong-1	North Korea			

==== Retired aircraft ====
Aero L-39 Albatros, Ilyushin Il-10, Ilyushin Il-18, Ilyushin Il-28, Lavochkin La-9, Lavochkin La-11, Mikoyan-Gurevich MiG-15bis, Mil Mi-1, Mil Mi-4, Nakajima Ki-43, Nanchang A-5C, Nanchang CJ-6, Polikarpov Po-2, Tupolev Tu-2, Yakovlev Yak-9P, Yakovlev Yak-18, sukhoi su-7

== Ranks and uniforms ==
=== Ranks ===
The Korean People's Air Force has five categories of ranks: general officers, senior officers, junior officers, non-commissioned officers, and airmen.

==== Officers ====
Rank group	General / flag officers						Senior officers				Junior officers
Korean People's Army Air Force
Korean People's Army Air Force	인민군원수; Inmingun-wonsu	차수; Chasu	대장; Daejang	상장; Sangjang	중장; Chungjang	소장; Sojang	대좌; Daechwa	상좌; Sangjwa	중좌; Chungjwa	소좌; Sojwa	대위; Taewi	상위; Sangwi	중위; Chungwi	소위; Sowi

Occasionally KPA Air Force officers are promoted above General of the Air Force. In that case, they wear an army-style uniform, since ranks from Vice-Marshal and above are not divided into army, navy and air force.

	Supreme commanders		Marshals
Ranks in Korean	Tae wonsu 대원수	Konghwaguk Wonsu 공화국원수	Wonsu 원수	Ch'asu 차수
Ranks	Generalissimo	Marshal of the DPRK	Marshal of the KPA	Vice Marshal

==== Enlisted ====
Rank group	Senior NCOs					Junior NCOs		Enlisted
Korean People's Army Air Force
Korean People's Army Air Force	특무상사; T'ŭkmu-sangsa	상사; Sangsa	중사; Chungsa	하사; Hasa	상급병사; Sanggŭp-pyŏngsa	중급병사; Chungŭp-pyŏngsa	하급병사; Hagŭp-pyŏngsa	전사; Chŏnsa

=== Uniforms ===
Generally as a separate service in the KPA, the service wears the same KPA uniforms but with air force blue peaked caps (especially for officers) or kepi-styled caps for men and berets for women, worn with their full dress uniforms. Pilots wear helmets and flight suits when on parade and when in flight duty while air defense personnel wear the same duty dress uniforms as their ground forces counterparts but with air force blue borders on the caps.

== Defections ==
Due to the political condition of North Korea, several North Korean pilots from the KPAF defected with their jets. These incidents include:

- On September 21, 1953, 21-year-old No Kum-sok, a senior lieutenant, flew his MiG-15bis across to the South and landed at Kimpo Air Base near Seoul. Considered an intelligence bonanza, since this fighter plane was then the best the Communist bloc had. No was awarded a sum of $100,000 ($1.2 million in 2025 dollars) and the right to reside in the United States. He was awarded American citizenship.
- On August 5, 1960, a Shenyang J-5 landed at Kimpo, the second time a J-5 appeared in South Korea. This aircraft was kept by South Korea and was briefly flown in South Korean markings before being scrapped.
- In February 1983, Lee Ung-pyong used a training exercise to defect and landed his Shenyang F-6C at an airfield in Seoul. According to the then common practice, he received a commission in the Republic of Korea Air Force (ROKAF), eventually becoming a colonel and teaching at the South Korean academy until his death in 2002. He received a reward of 1.2 billion South Korean won.
- On May 23, 1996, Captain Lee Chul-su defected with another Shenyang F-6C, number 529, to Suwon Air Base, South Korea. He reportedly left behind his wife and two children. Lee was rewarded 480 million South Korean Won (approx. 400 thousand US dollars). He is now a colonel in the ROKAF and is an academic instructor.

== See also ==
- Air Koryo
- Jebi Sports Club
- North Korean Ground Force
- North Korean Navy
- Republic of Korea Air Force
