= List of Air Koryo destinations =

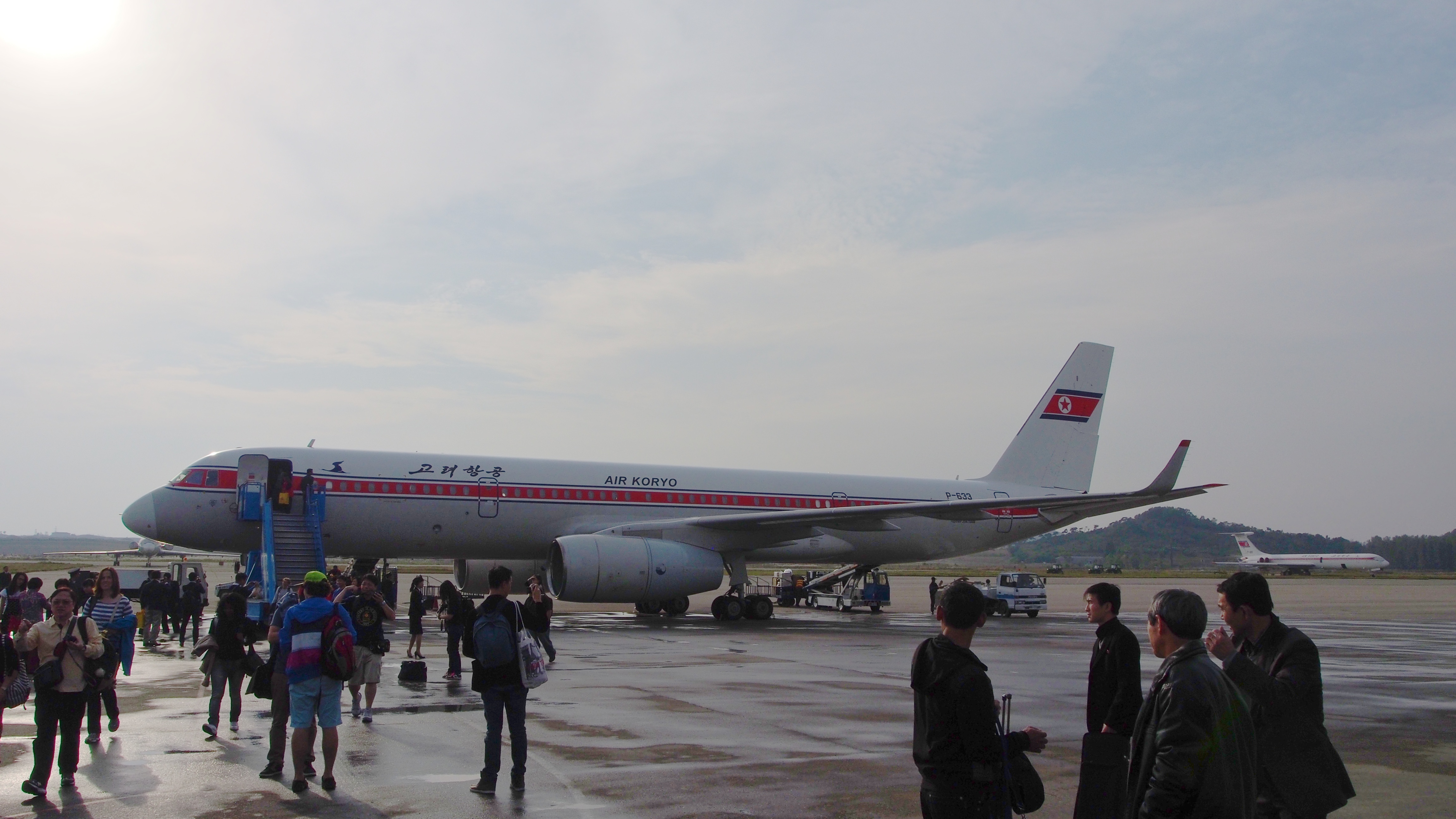
An Air Koryo Tupolev Tu-204-100 at its hub, Pyongyang International Airport (pictured 2013)

Air Koryo (Note: Korean: 고려항공; Hancha: 高麗航空; MR: Koryŏ Hanggong) is the flag carrier of North Korea, owned by the country's National Aviation Administration of the DPRK, formerly the Air Koryo Administration. It was established in early 1950, soon after the creation of the country's flag, as Soviet–North Korean Airline or SOKAO, (Note: Korean: 소련-조선항공; Hancha: 蘇聯-朝鮮航空; MR: Solyŏn-josŏnhang-gong) a joint venture between the North Korean and Soviet governments operating flights between Pyongyang and Vladivostok, with select flights transiting in Chongjin, North Korea. More routes were then launched to serve cities of the Manchuria region in China: Beijing, as well as Chita via Shenyang, Harbin, Qiqihar, and Hailar. They were all operated using the Lisunov Li-2, and as part of an alliance with Soviet flag carrier Aeroflot who sought to expand its network.

Shortly after, the Korean War meant suspending services up to July 1953, when it was rebranded Ukamps and its network was shrunk to Pyongyang, Beijing, and Shenyang. It henceforth expanded its fleet, comprising Soviet Union products. On 21 September 1955, it was rebranded again to Korean Airways, (Note: Korean: 조선민항; Hancha: 朝鮮民航; MR: Josŏnminhang) with ownership shifted to the North Korean government following the Civil Aviation Administration of Korea. Domestic flights to Hamhung, North Korea, were added in 1958, but due to the North Korean people's lack of income and restrictions on travel, all domestic flights were temporarily discontinued. European flights to Berlin, Prague, and Moscow were launched using their first jetliner, the Tupolev Tu-154. In March 1992, following the end of the Cold War, it was rebranded again to Air Koryo and operated cargo routes to Russia and China using the Ilyushin Il-76. In 2006, the same year an accident occurred, the airline was banned from European Union airspace due to safety and maintenance concerns, and it has since not resumed routes there despite their Tupolev Tu-204 being granted flying rights in March 2010.

Air Koryo saw various route cancellations due to its controversial government. On 20 April 2011, it launched flights to Kuala Lumpur, with the last flight on 8 June 2014; it was later banned in 2017 due to sanctions following the assassination of Kim Jong-nam at the airport. In 2011, flights to Kuwait City were launched; however, six months later it was cancelled to prevent North Koreans from spreading news of the Arab Spring to their homeland. It later resumed in March 2014, but in October 2016 the airline was banned by the Kuwaiti government, citing the United Nations Security Council Resolution 2270. In July 2017, Pakistan banned the airline in Islamabad, often used as refueling stopover for the Kuwait route. In April, flights to Bangkok were banned. On 2 August 2019, following a 15-year pause, Air Koryo resumed flights to Macau. Due to the COVID-19 pandemic, all flights were cancelled starting February 2020. On 22 August 2023, the airline resumed operations with a flight to Beijing as well as two flights to Vladivostok on 25 and 28 August. The last Beijing flight was on 29 August; it was theorized the flights were only repatriating abroad North Korean citizens, and as bilateral token gestures.

== Destinations ==
All international routes except those to and from Pyongyang, Shenyang, Beijing, and Vladivostok are assumed terminated per the latest reports of the remaining routes. No domestic flights are listed for the public on its website.

Country	City	Airport	Notes	Ref.
Afghanistan	Kabul	Kabul International Airport	Terminated	
Bulgaria	Sofia	Vasil Levski Sofia Airport	Terminated	
China	Beijing	Beijing Capital International Airport		
China	Dalian	Dalian Zhoushuizi International Airport	Terminated	
China	Dandong	Dandong Langtou Airport	Terminated (Note: Due to sanctions against North Korea.)	
China	Hailar	Hulunbeier Hailar Airport	Terminated	
China	Harbin	Harbin Taiping International Airport	Terminated	
China	Qiqihar	Qiqihar Sanjiazi Airport	Terminated	
China	Shanghai	Shanghai Pudong International Airport	Terminated	
China	Shenyang	Shenyang Taoxian International Airport		
China	Macau	Macau International Airport	Terminated	
Czech Republic	Prague	Václav Havel Airport Prague	Terminated	
Germany	Berlin	Berlin Schönefeld Airport	Airport closed	
Hungary	Budapest	Budapest Ferenc Liszt International Airport	Terminated	
Iran	Tehran	Imam Khomeini International Airport	Terminated	
Japan	Nagoya	Nagoya Komaki Airport	Terminated	
Japan	Niigata	Niigata Airport	Terminated	
Kuwait	Kuwait City	Kuwait International Airport	Terminated	
Malaysia	Kuala Lumpur	Kuala Lumpur International Airport	Terminated	
Malta	Luqa	Malta International Airport	Terminated	
Myanmar	Yangon	Yangon International Airport	Terminated	
North Korea	Chongjin	Orang Airport		
North Korea	Hyesan	Hyesan Airfield	Terminated	
North Korea	Hamhung	Sondok Airport		
North Korea	Pyongyang	Pyongyang International Airport	Hub	
North Korea	Samjiyon	Samjiyon Airport		
North Korea	Wonsan	Kalma Airport		
Pakistan	Islamabad	Benazir Bhutto International Airport	Airport closed	
Russia	Chita	Chita-Kadala International Airport	Terminated	
Russia	Irkutsk	International Airport Irkutsk	Terminated	
Russia	Khabarovsk	Khabarovsk Novy Airport	Terminated	
Russia	Moscow	Sheremetyevo International Airport	Terminated	
Russia	Novosibirsk	Tolmachevo Airport	Terminated	
Russia	Vladivostok	Vladivostok International Airport		
Serbia	Belgrade	Belgrade Nikola Tesla Airport	Terminated	
Singapore	Singapore	Changi Airport	Terminated	
South Korea	Seoul	Incheon International Airport	Terminated	
Switzerland	Zürich	Zurich Airport	Terminated	
Thailand	Bangkok	Suvarnabhumi Airport	Terminated	
