= 1969 EC-121 shootdown incident =

Downing of a U.S. Navy aircraft by North Korea over the Sea of Japan

EC-121 shootdown incident
- Part of Korean Conflict, Cold War
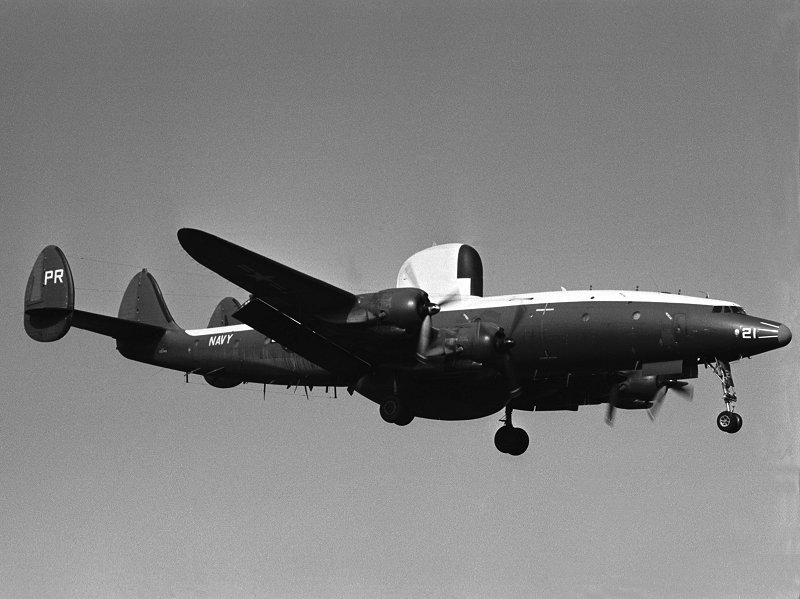
- USN EC-121 BuNo 135749, the aircraft involved in the incident
Date	15 April 1969
Location	Sea of Japan, 90 nautical miles (167 km) off the coast of North Korea
Result	North Korean victory

Belligerents
North Korea	United States

Strength
2 MiG-21s	1 Lockheed EC-121 Warning Star

Casualties and losses
none	1 EC-121 Warning Star destroyed 31 killed

On 15 April 1969, (Note: DPRK supreme leader Kim Il Sung's 57th birthday.) a United States Navy Lockheed EC-121M Warning Star of Fleet Air Reconnaissance Squadron One (VQ-1) on a reconnaissance mission was shot down by a North Korean MiG-21 aircraft over the Sea of Japan. The plane crashed 90 nautical miles (167 km) off the North Korean coast and all 31 Americans (30 sailors and 1 Marine) on board were killed, which constitutes the largest single loss of U.S. aircrew during the Cold War era.

The plane was an adaptation of a Lockheed Super Constellation and was fitted with a fuselage radar, so the primary tasks were to act as a long-range patrol, conduct electronic surveillance, and act as a warning device.

The Nixon administration did not retaliate against North Korea apart from staging a naval demonstration in the Sea of Japan a few days later, which was quickly removed. It resumed the reconnaissance flights within a week to demonstrate that it would not be intimidated by the action while at the same time avoiding a confrontation.

== Flight of Deep Sea 129 ==
=== Beggar Shadow Mission ===
The code name "Beggar Shadow" was used to describe the late-1960s Cold War reconnaissance program by the United States Navy that collected intelligence about and communications between Soviet Bloc nations while remaining safely (at least according to international laws) in international waters.

At 07:00 local time on Tuesday, 15 April 1969, an EC-121M of the U.S. Navy's Fleet Airborne Reconnaissance Squadron One (VQ-1) took off from NAS Atsugi, Japan, on an intelligence-gathering reconnaissance mission. The aircraft, Bureau number 135749, c/n 4316, bore the tail code "PR-21" and used the radio call sign Deep Sea 129. Aboard were 8 officers and 23 enlisted men under the command of LCDR James Overstreet. Nine of the crew, including one Marine NCO, were Naval Security Group cryptologic technicians (CTs) and linguists in Russian and Korean.

Deep Sea 129's assigned task was a routine Beggar Shadow signal intelligence (SIGINT) collection mission. Its flight profile involved taking off from NAS Atsugi then flying northwest over the Sea of Japan until it came to an area off Musu Point, where the EC-121M would turn northeast toward the Soviet Union and orbit along a 120-nautical-mile (222 km) long elliptical track similar to that of a racetrack; once the mission was complete, they were to return to Osan Air Base, South Korea. LCDR Overstreet's orders included a prohibition from approaching closer than 50 nautical miles (90 km) to the North Korean coast. VQ-1 had flown the route and orbit for two years, and the mission had been graded as being of "minimal risk." During the first three months of 1969, nearly 200 similar missions had been flown by both Navy and U.S. Air Force reconnaissance aircraft off North Korea's east coast without incident.

These missions, while nominally under the command of Seventh Fleet and CINCPAC, were controlled operationally by the Naval Security Group detachment at NSF Kamiseya, Japan, under the direction of the National Security Agency.

The mission was tracked by a series of security agencies within the Department of Defense that were pre-briefed on the mission, including land-based Air Force radars in South Korea and Japan. The USAF 6918th Security Squadron at Hakata Air Station, Japan, USAF 6988th Security Squadron at Yokota Air Base, Japan, and Detachment 1, 6922nd Security Wing at Osan Air Base monitored the North Korean reaction by intercepting its air defense search radar transmissions. The Army Security Agency communications interception station at Osan listened to North Korean air defense radio traffic, and the Naval Security Group at Kamiseya, which provided seven of the nine CTs aboard Deep Sea 129, also intercepted Soviet Air Force search radars.

=== Interception and shoot-down ===
Very soon after arrival over the Sea of Japan, at 10:35, North Korea reacted to the presence of the EC-121, but not in a way that would jeopardize the mission. At 12:34, roughly six hours into the mission, the Army Security Agency and radars in Korea detected the takeoff of two North Korean Air Force MiG-21s from East Tongchong-ni near Wonsan and tracked them, assuming that they were responding in some fashion to the mission of Deep Sea 129. In the meantime the EC-121 filed a scheduled activity report by radio on time at 13:00 and did not indicate anything out of the ordinary, but this was the last message sent from the plane. Twenty-two minutes later, the radars lost the picture of the MiGs and did not reacquire it until 13:37, when they were closing in on Deep Sea 129 for a probable intercept.

The communications that this activity generated within the National Security network were monitored by the EC-121's parent unit, VQ-1, which sent Deep Sea 129 a "Condition 3" alert by radio at 13:44, indicating it might be under attack. LCDR Overstreet acknowledged the warning and complied with procedures to abort the mission and return to base. Approaching from the northeastern coast at supersonic speed, however, the MiGs easily overtook the EC-121. The MiGs were armed with 23 mm cannons and AA-2 Atoll missiles; the EC-121 was unarmed and without a fighter escort. At 13:47, the radar tracks of the MiGs merged with that of Deep Sea 129, which disappeared from the radar picture two minutes later. The MiGs had attacked and shot the plane down, and while the details of the incident have never been released to the public, it is assumed that an air-to-air missile was used as the North Korean press mentioned that a "single shot" downed the aircraft.

== Reactions ==
=== Initial North Korean reaction ===
Immediately following the attack, the North Korean forces assumed a state of high alert. Their media broadcast its version of events two hours after the incident. Referring to the EC-121 as the "plane of the insolent U.S. imperialist aggressor army," the North Korean media accused it of "reconnoitering after intruding deep into the territorial air." The story cast it as "the brilliant battle success of shooting it down with a single shot by showering the fire of revenge upon it."

=== Initial United States reaction ===
At first, none of the agencies were alarmed, since procedures also dictated that the EC-121 rapidly descend below radar coverage, and Overstreet had not transmitted that he was under attack. When it did not reappear within ten minutes, VQ-1 requested a scramble of two Air Force Convair F-106 Delta Dart interceptors to provide combat air patrol for the EC-121.

By 14:20, the Army Security Agency post had become increasingly concerned. It first sent a FLASH message (a high priority intelligence message to be actioned within six minutes) indicating that Deep Sea 129 had disappeared, and then at 14:44, an hour after the shoot-down, sent a CRITIC ("critical intelligence") message (the highest message priority, to be processed and sent within two minutes) to six addressees within the National Command Authority, including President Richard M. Nixon and National Security Advisor Henry Kissinger.

Nixon regarded the attack as a total surprise and remained at a loss to explain it. The U.S. bureaucracy and the members of the National Security Council were also unable to understand the attack.

=== Soviet reaction ===
Despite being the height of the Cold War, the Soviet Union quickly provided assistance in the recovery efforts. Two Soviet destroyers were sent to the Sea of Japan, and their involvement highlighted Moscow's disapproval of the attack on the EC-121.

== U.S. response ==
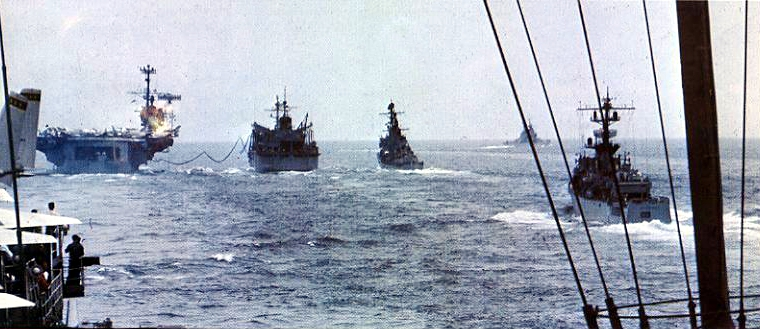
Ships of Task Force 71 underway off Korea in April 1969.

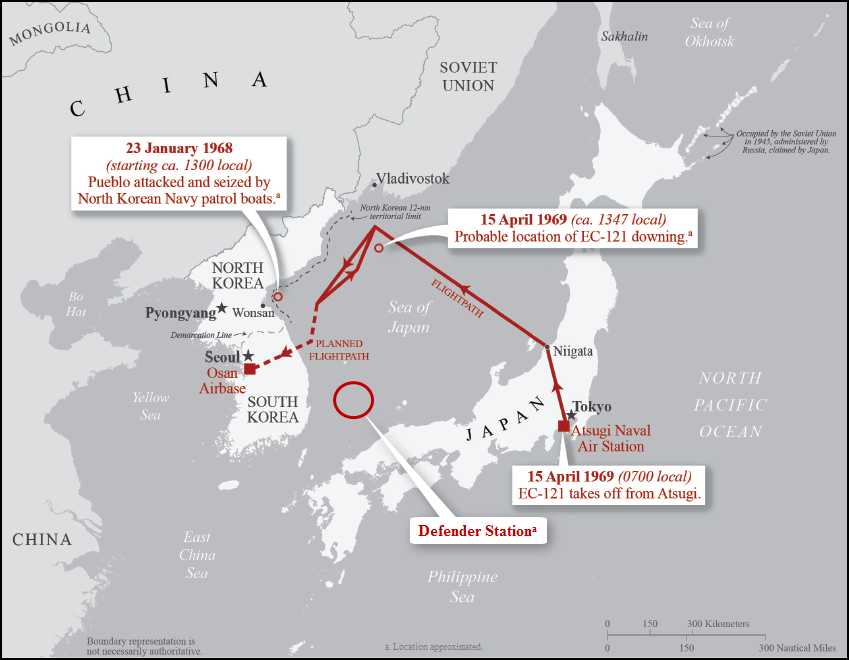
Defender Station

The US responded by activating Task Force 71 (TF-71) to protect future flights over those international waters. Initially, the Task Force comprised the aircraft carriers Enterprise, Ticonderoga, Ranger, and Hornet with a screen of cruisers and destroyers that also included the battleship New Jersey. The ships for TF-71 came mostly from Southeast Asia duty. This deployment became one of the largest shows of force in the area since the Korean War.

Following the attack, some, including Representative Mendel Rivers responded to the attack by calling for retaliation against North Korea. On April 16, the United States National Security Council considered the following options:

- Show of force using naval and air forces
- Resumption of EC-121 missions with escorts
- "Select military combat actions" such as:
  - Destruction of a North Korean aircraft over water
  - Selected air strikes against a military target
  - Shore bombardment of military targets
  - Ground raids across the Demilitarized Zone
  - Attack on military targets near the Demilitarized Zone by artillery or missile fire
  - Attacks on North Korean naval vessels by U.S. submarines
  - Blockade
  - Mining/threatening to mine North Korean waters
  - Seizure of North Korean assets abroad
  - Use of strategic nuclear weapons

General Earle Wheeler, chairman of the Joint Chiefs of Staff, presented to the NSC a plan to attack North Korea with missiles carrying atomic warheads of 30 kilotons each, roughly equal to two-and-half times the bomb dropped on Hiroshima. Wheeler said such an attack likely would provoke retaliation. A day later, National Security Adviser Henry Kissinger told Nixon by telephone that, given the prospect of retaliation with the use of strategic warheads, "We might have to go to tactical nuclears."

In addition to the NSC's ideas, the Joint Chiefs of Staff prepared several plans to bomb the airfield at Sondok and Wonsan. If all went according to plan, bombers would attack the airfields under the cover of night. CINCPAC proposed the positioning of ships, with missiles capable of taking down planes, in the Sea of Japan with orders to destroy North Korean aircraft, impound other North Korean vessels venturing into international waters (fishing boats, etc.), and fire onto the shore (especially near Wonsan).

In the end, no action was taken against the North Koreans in the days following the attack. The new Nixon administration had little to no information about the location and availability of both U.S. and North Korean forces, as the administration had difficulty communicating with those in the Pacific. By the time this information was communicated to the planners, it was too late to react. Both Nixon and National Security Advisor Henry Kissinger were ashamed at the outcome of the event, with Kissinger describing "our conduct in the EC-121 crisis as weak, indecisive, and disorganized." Once it became clear that no action would be taken against the North Koreans, Nixon promised that "they'll (i.e., North Koreans) never get away with it again," and ordered a "resumption of aerial reconnaissance flights."

=== Task Force 71, 1969 ===
Carrier Groups			Screening Force			
Command	Aircraft Carriers	Carrier Air Wing	Battleships / Cruisers	DLG / DDG	Destroyers	Destroyers / Destroyer Escorts
Carrier Division 7	USS Enterprise (CVAN-65)	Carrier Air Wing 9	USS New Jersey (BB-62)	USS Sterett (DLG-31)	USS Meredith (DD-890)	USS Gurke (DD-783)
Carrier Division 3	USS Ranger (CVA-61)	Carrier Air Wing 2	USS Chicago (CG-11)	USS Dale (DLG-19)	USS Henry W. Tucker (DD-875)	USS Lyman K. Swenson (DD-729)
Carrier Division 9	USS Ticonderoga (CVA-14)	Carrier Air Wing 16	USS Oklahoma City (CLG-5)	USS Mahan (DLG-11)	USS Perry (DD-844)	USS John W. Weeks (DD-701)
ASW Group 5	USS Hornet (CVS-12)	ASW Air Group 57	USS Saint Paul (CA-73)	USS Parsons (DDG-33)	USS Ernest G. Small (DD-838)	USS Radford (DD-446)
——	——	——	——	USS Lynde McCormick (DDG-8)	USS Shelton (DD-790)	USS Davidson (DE-1045)
——	——	——	——	——	USS Richard B. Anderson (DD-786)	——

Major naval units of Task Force 71
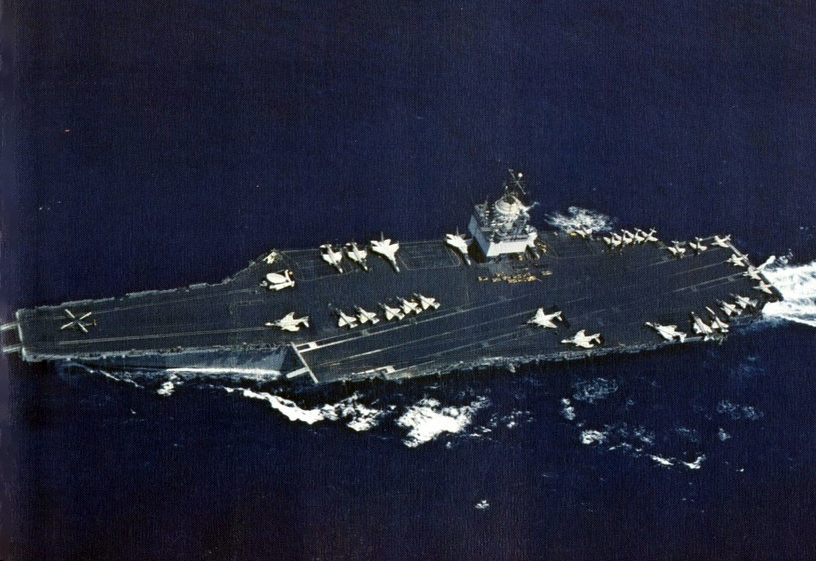
USS Enterprise (CVAN-65), flagship

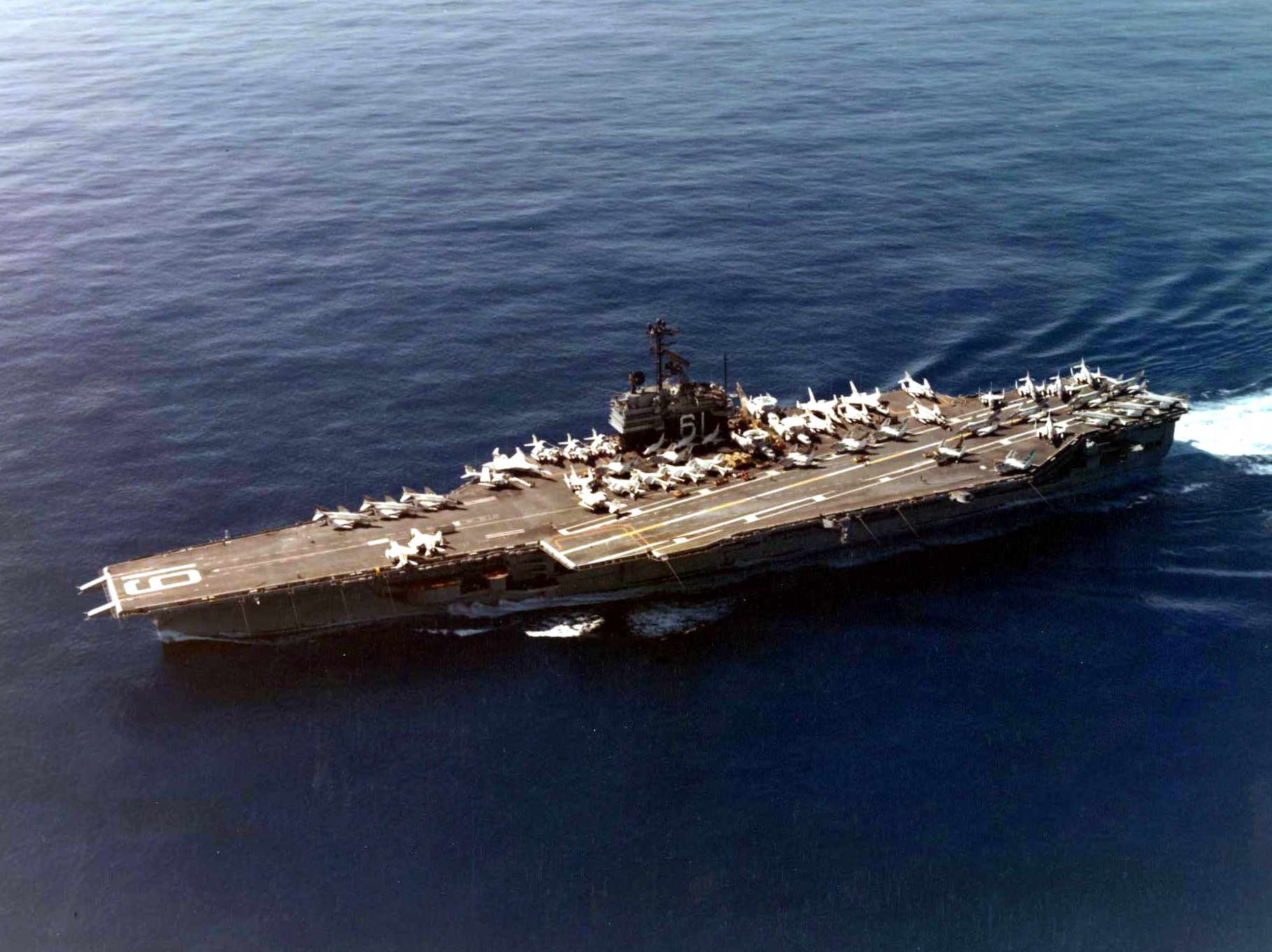
USS Ranger (CVA-61)

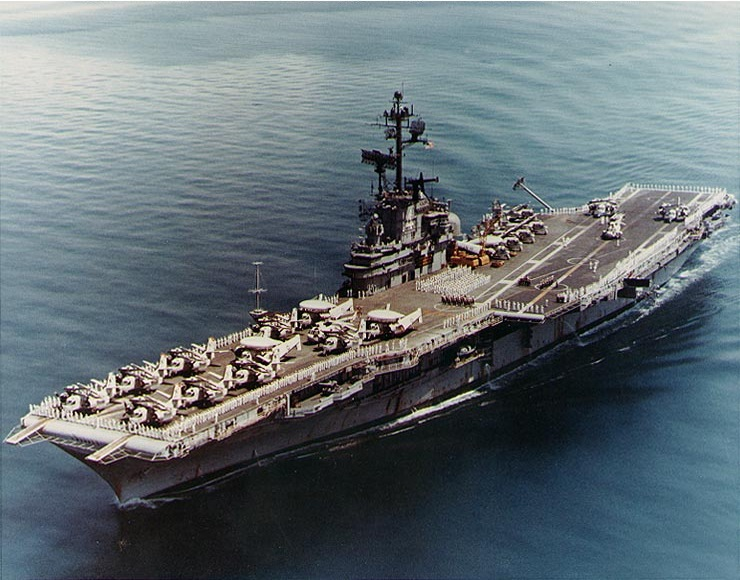
USS Ticonderoga (CVA-14)

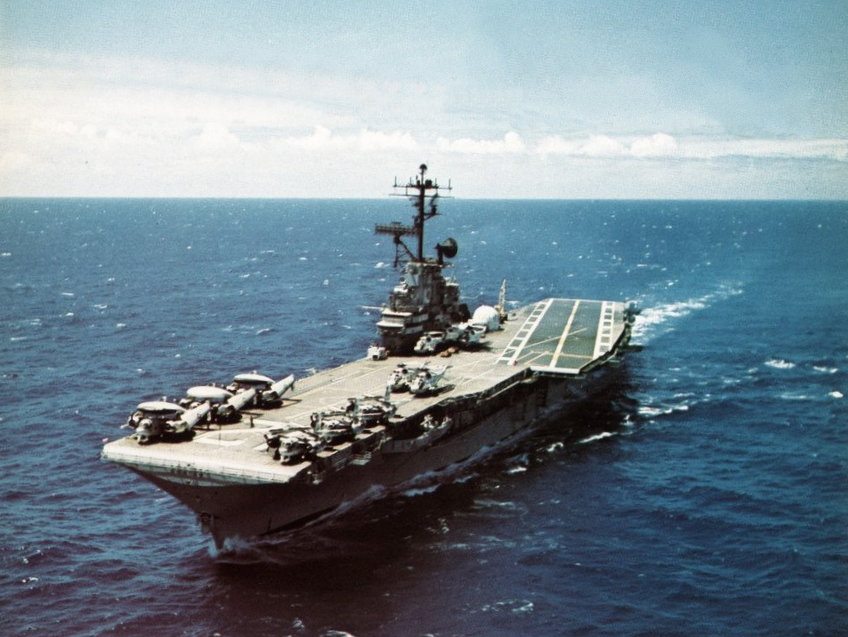
USS Hornet (CVS-12)

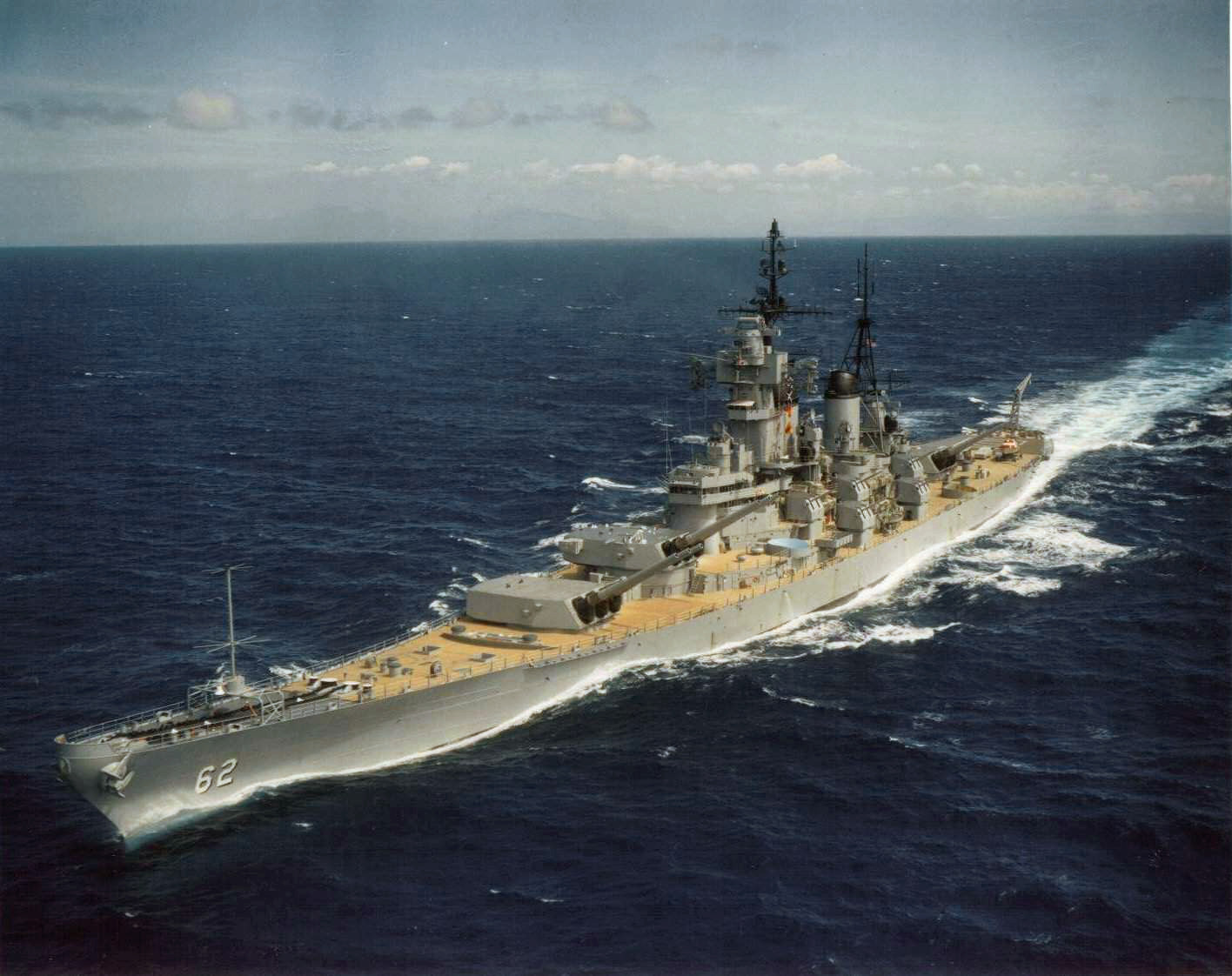
USS New Jersey (BB-62)

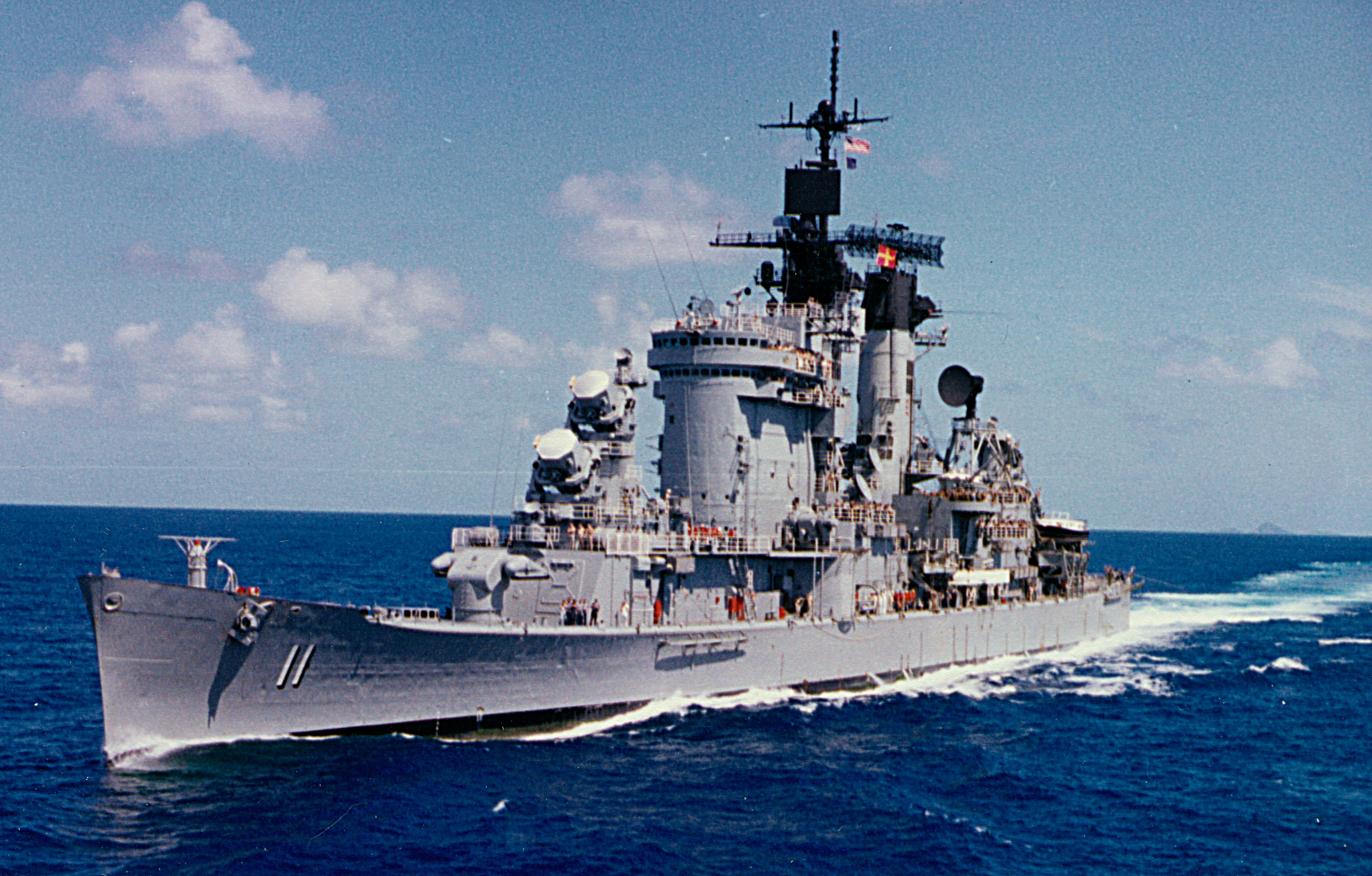
USS Chicago (CG-11)

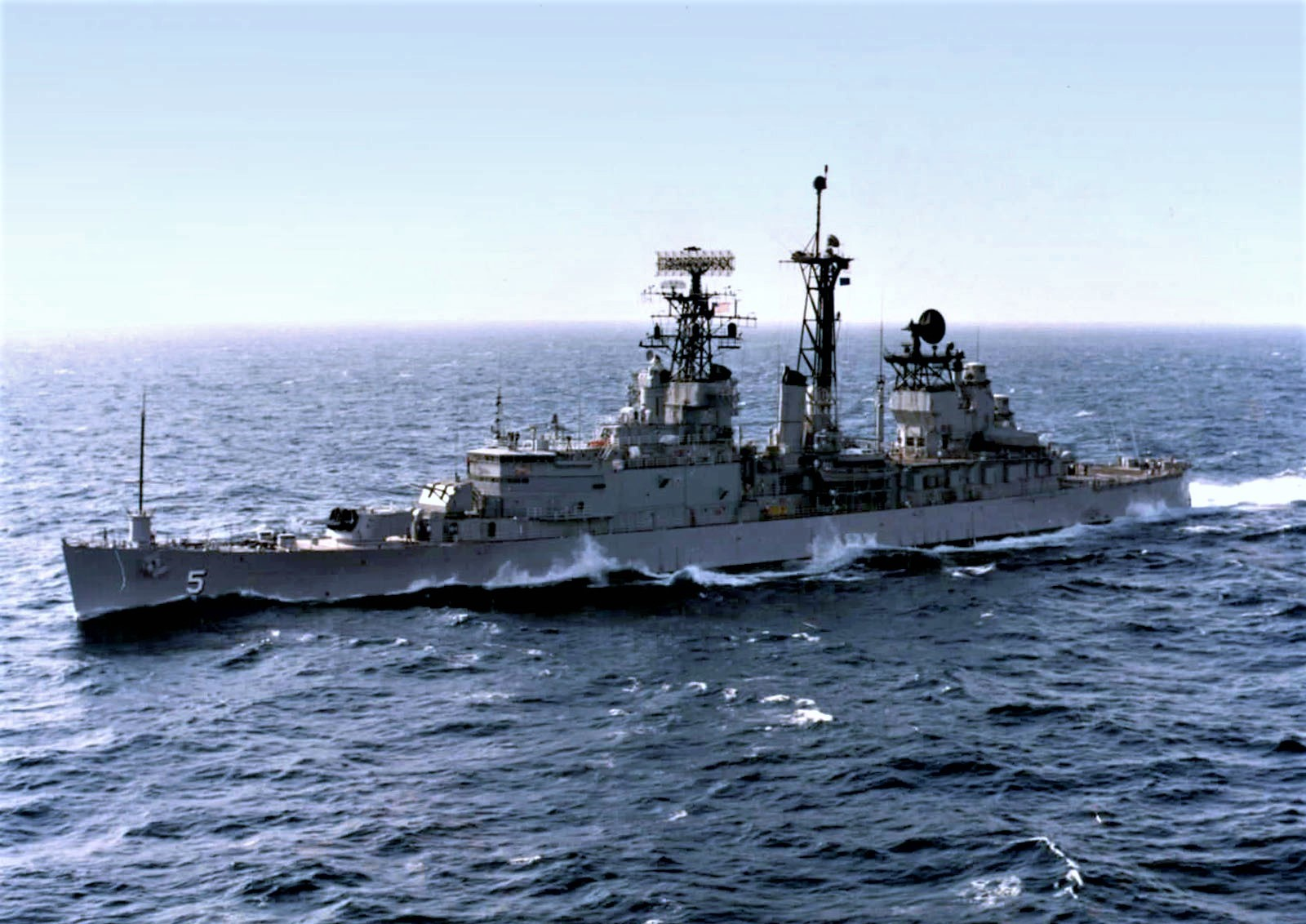
USS Oklahoma City (CLG-5)

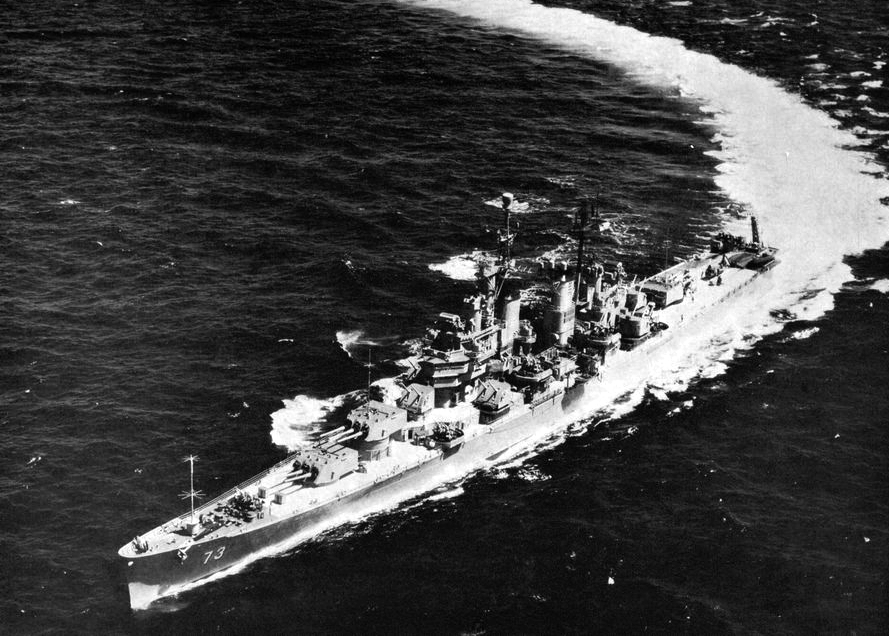
USS Saint Paul (CA-73)

== Motivation for the attack ==
A few theories have arisen to explain the unprompted take down of the EC-121, but all revolve around North Korea as a rogue entity. Nixon and his administration assumed that North Korea would behave within the standards of international law. Similar to the Pueblo incident, Pyongyang took action against the EC-121 plane despite it being located well outside North Korean territory.

Other sources claim that this attack may have taken place to honor Kim Il Sung, as his birthday fell on April 15, but not enough evidence exists to support this statement.

Some also believe that this may have been an accidental shooting, but many disagree because of the promptness of the media coverage in North Korea as well as its story that the plane had entered far into North Korean airspace. In the end, not enough information is available outside of North Korea to discern the true motive.

== See also ==
- Hainan Island incident
- Korean axe murder incident
