= USS Mountrail =

US Navy attack transport ship

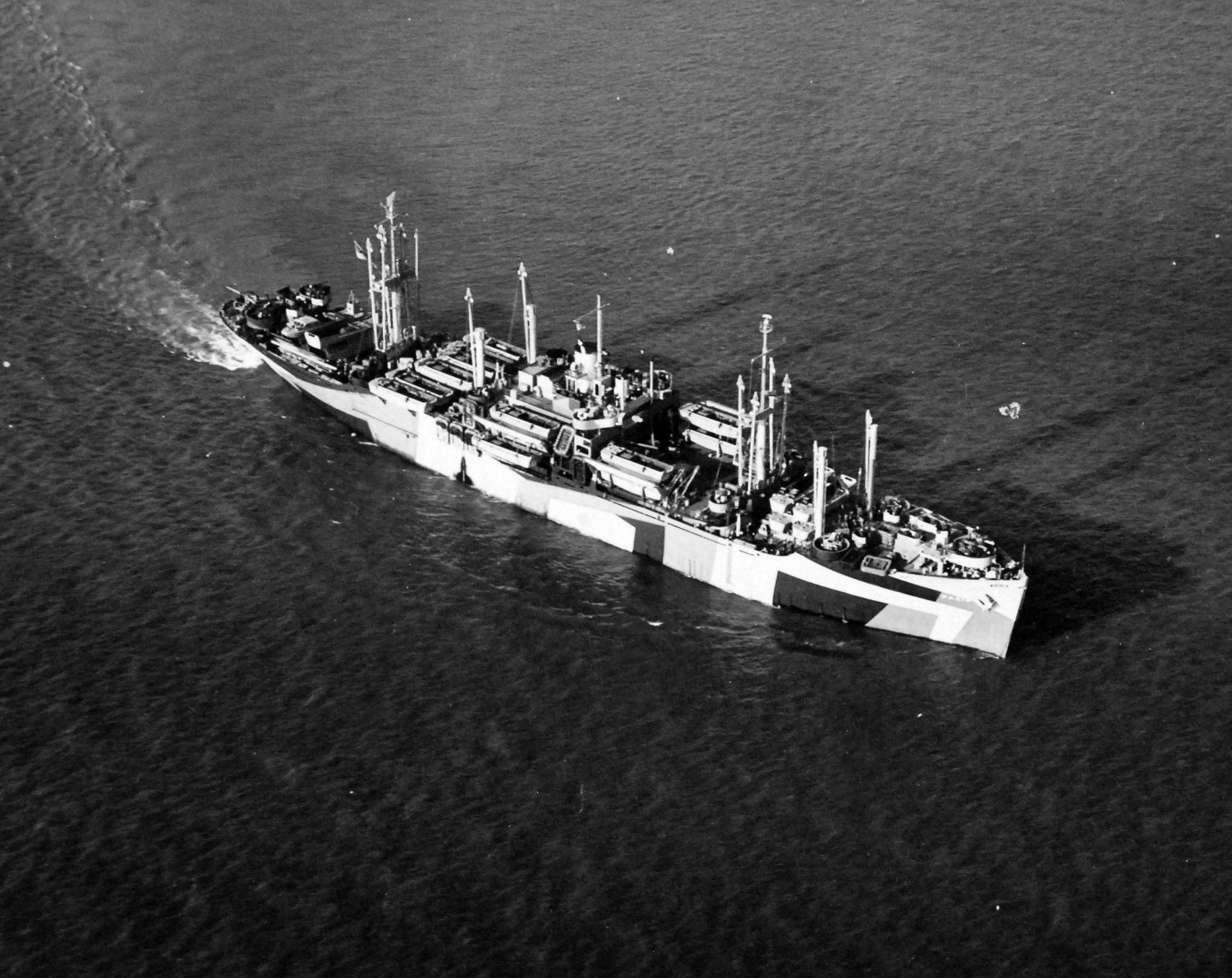
- Starboard aerial bow view of USS Mountrail (APA-213), under way off the coast of California, in December 1944.

History

United States
- Name: Mountrail
- Namesake: Mountrail County, North Dakota
- Ordered: as a Type VC2-S-AP5 hull, MCE hull 561
- Builder: Permanente Metals Corporation, Richmond, California
- Yard number: 561
- Laid down: 24 June 1944
- Launched: 20 September 1944
- Sponsored by: Mrs Margaret H. Marshall
- Commissioned: 16 November 1944
- Decommissioned: 12 July 1946
- Identification: Hull symbol: APA-213; Code letters: NPPT
- Honors and awards: 1 × battle star for World War II service
- Fate: laid up in the Pacific Reserve Fleet, Stockton Group, 12 July 1946

United States
- Recommissioned: 9 September 1950
- Decommissioned: 1 October 1955
- Honors and awards: 3 × battle stars for Korean War service
- Fate: Withdrawn for Reserve Fleet, 5 August 1961, for reactivation

United States
- Acquired: 5 August 1961
- Recommissioned: 22 November 1961
- Decommissioned: 13 August 1970
- Reclassified: redesignated Amphibious Transport (LPA-213), 1 January 1969
- Stricken: 1 December 1976
- Identification: Hull symbol: APA-213; Hull symbol: LPA-213
- Fate: Scrapping complete, 21 May 1991

General characteristics
- Class & type: Haskell-class attack transport
- Type: Type VC2-S-AP5
- Displacement: 6,873 long tons (6,983 t) (light load); 14,837 long tons (15,075 t) (full load)
- Length: 455 ft (139 m)
- Beam: 62 ft (19 m)
- Draft: 24 ft (7.3 m)
- Installed power: 2 × Babcock & Wilcox header-type boilers, 465 psi (3,210 kPa) 750 °F (399 °C); 8,500 shp (6,338 kW)
- Propulsion: 1 × Westinghouse geared turbine; 1 x propeller
- Speed: 17.7 kn (32.8 km/h; 20.4 mph)
- Boats & landing craft carried: 2 × LCMs; 1 × open LCPL; 18 × LCVPs; 2 × LCPRs; 1 × closed LCPL (Captain's Gig)
- Capacity: 2,900 long tons (2,900 t) DWT; 150,000 cu ft (4,200 m^{3}) (non-refrigerated)
- Troops: 86 officers, 1,475 enlisted
- Complement: 55 officers, 477 enlisted
- Armament: 1 × 5 in (127 mm)/38 caliber dual purpose gun; 1 × quad 40 mm (1.6 in) Bofors anti-aircraft (AA) gun mounts; 4 × twin 40mm Bofors (AA) gun mounts; 10 × single 20 mm (0.8 in) Oerlikon cannons AA mounts

Service record
- Part of: TransRon 17 (WWII)
- Operations: World War II; Assault and occupation of Okinawa Gunto (26 March–25 April 1945); Korean War; First UN Counter Offensive (5–12 February 1951); Communist China Spring Offensive (11–14 May 1951); Korean Defense Summer–Fall 1952 (1–19 August, 27 August–4 September, 17–18 October, 11–19 November 1952)
- Awards: World War II; American Campaign Medal; Asiatic–Pacific Campaign Medal; World War II Victory Medal; Navy Occupation Service Medal; National Defense Service Medal; China Service Medal; Philippine Liberation Medal; Korean War; Korean Service Medal; United Nations Korea Medal; Republic of Korea War Service Medal; Vietnam Era; Navy E Ribbon; Armed Forces Expeditionary Medal; Navy Expeditionary Medal

USS Mountrail (APA/LPA-213) was a Haskell-class attack transport of the US Navy in World War II, the Korean War and Vietnam War era. She was of the VC2-S-AP5 Victory ship design type. Mountrail was named for Mountrail County, North Dakota.

== Construction ==
Mountrail was laid down 24 June 1944, under Maritime Commission (MARCOM) contract, MCV hull 561, by Permanente Metals Corporation, Yard No. 2, Richmond, California; launched 20 September 1944; sponsored by Mrs. Margaret H. Marshall; and commissioned 16 November 1944.

== Service history ==
=== World War II ===
Following shakedown, Mountrail embarked troops at Seattle and sailed for the Philippines 10 January 1945.

==== Invasion of Okinawa ====
Reaching Leyte Gulf 21 February, she put to sea with men of the 77th Infantry Division for amphibious training off Leyte before departing San Pedro Bay 21 March to join a convoy for the Okinawa invasion. She arrived off Kerama Retto 26 March. While she landed troops 2 April, her gunners shot down three planes.

==== Transport duties ====
Mountrail departed Kerama Retto and arrived San Francisco 22 May, to load troops for the Philippines, whom she disembarked at Manila. Returning San Francisco 5 August, she sailed with more troops, landing them at Batangas, Luzon, 11 September. At Leyte Gulf she took on occupation troops whom she landed at Hakodate, Japan, 4 October. then carried Marines from Japan to Qingdao, China, before sailing for home 5 November.

==== First decommissioning ====
She decommissioned 12 July 1946, and entered the Pacific Reserve Fleet at Stockton, California.

=== Korean War ===
With the outbreak of the Korean War, Mountrail recommissioned 9 September 1950, and sailed 22 December, for the Far East to carry men between Japan and Korea until returning San Diego 2 August 1951. On 28 May 1952, she sailed for her second tour of duty with the 7th Fleet operating between Hong Kong and Korea for the next 6 months. On 14 October 1952, she joined in the feint off Kojo, Korea, which tricked the Communists completely.

=== Operation "Passage to Freedom" ===
Mountrail returned to Long Beach in December and trained on the West Coast until sailing for Japan 28 November 1953. She sailed between the Philippines and Japan until August. when she Joined Operation Passage to Freedom, the massive evacuation of refugees from North to South Vietnam.

==== Second decommissioning ====
She returned to Pacific Reserve Fleet, Long Beach 9 October 1954, and decommissioned 1 October 1955, to return to the Pacific Reserve Fleet, and later transferred to the National Defense Reserve Fleet, Suisun Bay, California, 7 June 1960.

=== Third commission ===
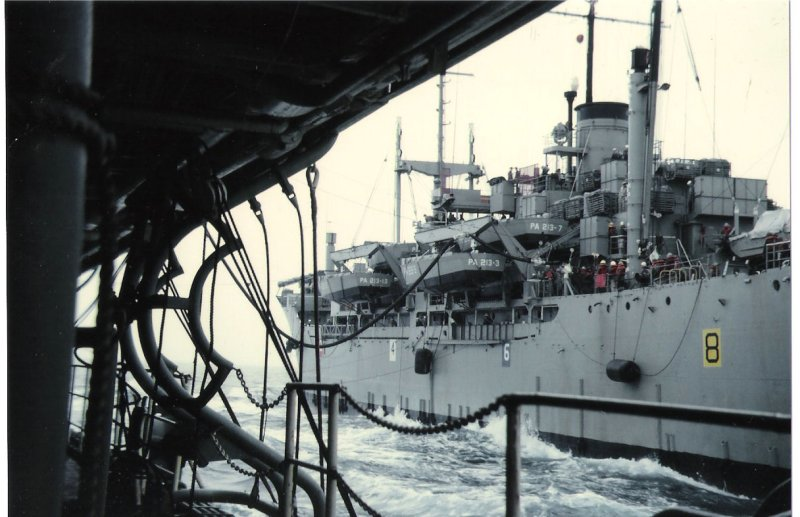
USS Mountrail (APA-213), during an underway refueling from USS Waccamaw (AO-109), 1967

Mountrail recommissioned 22 November 1961, and sailed to join Amphibious Squadron 12, US Atlantic Fleet. During training, she operated in the Atlantic and Caribbean, strengthening American forces at Guantánamo Bay during the Cuban Missile Crisis of fall 1962. In October and November 1964 she took part in NATO landing exercises in southern Spain, and 8 February 1965, she left Norfolk, Virginia for her first deployment with the 6th Fleet. She took part in exercises off Norway in June and July, returning Norfolk 20 July.

Into 1969, Mountrail had continued annual deployments with the 6th Fleet, strengthening the amphibious capability of this bulwark of freedom in the Mediterranean.

==== Final decommissioning ====
She was decommissioned 13 August 1970, with delivery to the Maritime Administration (MARAD) the same day. Mountrail was laid up in the National Defense Reserve Fleet, James River Group, Lee Hall, Virginia. She was struck from the Navy Vessel Register on 1 December 1976. On 19 September 1984, she was withdrawn from the fleet for stripping, being returned 14 August 1985.

On 28 September 1989, she was traded-out, along with Santa Barbara, Bessemer Victory, and Halaula Victory, to Exxon Shipping Company, for Exxon Lexington. She was immediately resold to Rivson International, Inc. On 15 March 1990, she was again sold by Bomar Resources, formerly Rivson Int., Inc., to Eckhardt Marine, Gmbh, for scrapping in India or Bangladesh. She was withdrawn from the fleet 1 June 1990, with scrapping in India final 21 May 1991.

== Awards ==
Mountrail received one battle star for World War II service and three for Korean War service.

== Notes ==
Citations

== Bibliography ==
Online resources

- "Mountrail". Dictionary of American Naval Fighting Ships. Naval History and Heritage Command. 24 December 2015. This article incorporates text from this source, which is in the public domain.
- "Kaiser Permanente No. 2, Richmond CA". www.ShipbuildingHistory.com. 13 October 2010.
- "USS Mountrail (LPA-213)". NavSource. 5 August 2016.
- "MOUNTRAIL (LPA-213)". United States Department of Transportation. Archived from the original on 30 March 2016.
