= Kang Da Ri Airport =

Airport in Wonsan, North Korea

- IATA: N/A; ICAO: N/A; FAA LID: N/A

Summary
- Airport type: Military
- Serves: Wonsan, North Korea
- Elevation AMSL: 56 ft (17 m)
- Coordinates: 39°05′55.40″N 127°24′56.30″E
- Interactive map of Kang Da Ri Airport

Runways
Direction	Length		Surface
Direction	ft	m	Surface
04/22	1,560	475	Asphalt

Korean name
- Hangul: 강다리비행장
- Hanja: 강다리飛行場
- RR: Gangdari bihaengjang
- MR: Kangdari pihaengjang

Kang Da Ri Airport (Korean: 강다리비행장) is an airport in Wonsan, Kangwon-do, North Korea. It is immediately adjacent to the nearby Kang Da Ri Highway Strip.

== Facilities ==
The airfield has a single asphalt runway 04/22 measuring 1560 x 46 feet (475 x 14 m). It is sited across a river from the Kang Da Ri Highway strip, and recent satellite photos appear to show a bridge connecting the two under construction. The reported runway appears to be on substantial fill and possibly extends through a nearby hill and emerges on the other side. The field is a few miles southwest of Wonsan Airport.
