= Korean Air Force =

Korean Air Force may refer to:

- Korean People's Army Air Force, Air Force of North Korea
- Republic of Korea Air Force, Air Force of South Korea
