= Sunan Airport =

Sunan Airport may refer to:

- Pyongyang Sunan International Airport in Sunan, Pyongyang, North Korea
- Wuxi Shuofang International Airport in Wuxi, Jiangsu Province, China, operated by Sunan Shuofang International Airport company
