= Saetbyol-4 =

North Korean unmanned aerial vehicle

- Saetbyol-4 in Panghyon Airbase

General information
- Other name: 샛별-4, Morning Star-4
- Role: Surveillance Aircraft, Unmanned Aerial Vehicle
- National origin: North Korea
- Manufacturer: Korean People's Army Air Force
- Primary user: North Korea

History
- First flight: 18 September 2025

The Saetbyol-4 (Korean: 샛별-4; lit. 'Morning Star-4') is an unmanned aerial vehicle developed by the Korean People's Army Air Force. First initiated in 2021 in the 8th Party Congress by Kim Jong Un. It first emerged in 2023, and underwent flight tests on 18 September 2025. It has been noted to bear resemblance to the Northrop Grumman RQ-4 Global Hawk, and has been seen as North Korea's entry point into the realm of expanding their unmanned arsenal, as well as the development of domestic artificial intelligence (AI). While the Saebyeol-4 is intended for surveillance, other variants have been developed in conjunction with it, including the Saetbyol-9, designated an attack drone.

== Development ==
In 2021, during the 8th Congress of the Workers' Party of Korea, Kim Jong Un celebrated the accomplishments of the Nuclear program of North Korea from 2017 onwards, including the developments of the Pukguksong-1 line of submarine-launched ballistic missiles and the Hwasong line of intercontinental ballistic missiles. In his speech to the party, Kim called upon the expansion of arsenal for the Korean People's Army including electronic weapons and UAVs with a goal of achieving targets 15,000 km away as well as drones with 500 km range. This was seen as the ramping up on tension between North Korea and the United States as well as South Korea, in an attempt to replicate wolf warrior diplomacy which originated from China.

On 27 July 2023, the Rodong Sinmun unveiled the first drones at the "Weapons and Equipment Exhibition 2023" held in Pyongyang, two and a half years after the initial announcement, accompanied by the first demonstrated usage. Kim Jong Un and Russian Minister of Defence Sergei Shoigu was seen examining the drones, which were on display alongside the Hwasong-17 and Hwasong-18. It was noted that each were decorated with the words “DPRK Air Force (조선인민군공군)” with noted resemblance to the RQ-4 Global Hawk and General Atomics MQ-9 Reaper. The first alleged sighting was reported on 14 June 2023 at Panghyon Airport through satellite photos captured by Planet Labs.

Throughout 2025, testing and explosions were detected at Panghyon Airbase with satellite imagery, indicated with craters and videos of the utilization of kamikaze drones. Kim's visit to Kusong on 8 September 2025 indicated increased interest and inspection of the tests.

Further testing was overseen by Kim and Chief Advisor on Munitions Policy Ri Pyong-chol at what is designated the Unmanned Aerial Technology Complex (UATC, 무인항공기술련합체) on 19 September 2025. In it, Kim reiterated his original objective of integrating AI into the military apparatus, a development seen as a result of the Russian invasion of Ukraine and an effort to revamp the aging fleet of the Air Force.

== Description ==
While maintaining its resemblance to the RQ-4 and MQ-9, the Saebyeol-4 is noted to be composition of domestic and Chinese electronics. Based upon the size of the aircraft, observers noted that the front and main landing gear (oriented reverse) and chassis derives from the Chengdu J-7, a spinoff of the Mikoyan-Gurevich MiG-21. It is believed that the North Korean stock of 130 J-7/MiG-21 was used and converted in the development process. The conversion of retrofitting existing aircraft landing gear to new models denotes an early-stage prototype and not something for mass production.

It was estimated in early 2024 that the drone weighs about less than 9 tons (compared to the RQ-4's 14.6 tons), and has an approximate wingspan of 30–35 meters with a 10-15 meter long fuselage. It is also equipped with a satellite antenna for long distance control. Lacking the more advanced components that the RQ-4 has, the Saebyeol-4 is believed to be primarily used for surveillance, air defense training or a relay drone. Development of the aircraft continues as of early 2026 with Saebyeol-4 wingspan of ~40 meters and length of ~14.25 meter being comparable to that of RQ-4B Block 30/40.

== Response ==
Analysts abroad noted that the drone's resemblance to the RQ-4 is superficial in scope, with Asan Institute for Policy Studies fellow Yang Uk stating that the drone's development is largely a political achievement for the Kim regime.

South Korea's Ministry of Unification spokeswoman Chang Yoon-jeong stated that the drone program will be continued to be monitored.
