= Wonsan International Friendship Air Festival =

Air show in Wonsan, North Korea

- Logo for the (cancelled) 2017 air festival
- Status: Active
- Genre: Air show
- Date: September
- Frequency: Annual
- Venue: Kalma Airport
- Locations: Wonsan, North Korea
- Country: North Korea
- Years active: 2016, 2017 (cancelled)
- Inaugurated: September 2016
- Most recent: September 2016
- Next event: September 23, 2017 (cancelled); September 24, 2017 (cancelled)
- Website: www.wonsanairfestival.com

The Wonsan International Friendship Air Festival (Korean: 원산국제친선항공축전), or Wonsan Air Festival, is an air show first held in September 2016 at Kalma Airport in Wonsan, North Korea.

== 2016 ==
At the 2016 edition the Korean People's Army Air Force displayed a number of its aircraft, including Su-25, MiG-21 and MiG-29 combat aircraft. In addition Tu-134, Tu-154, An-24, Il-62 and Il-76 aircraft of Air Koryo, the North Korean national airline, also participated. Around 10,000-15,000 local spectators watched the show, as did a number of international journalists and around 200 international aviation enthusiasts.

== 2017 ==
Initially there were plans to hold the air show every two years, but in March 2017 it was announced that a second edition of the air show would be held between 23 and 24 September 2017. It was announced that the MiG-23 fighter would appear.

In August 2017, a month before the event, the 2017 edition of the show was cancelled for "geopolitical reasons".
