= Saetbyol-9 =

North Korean unmanned aerial vehicle

General information
- Other name: 샛별-9, Morning Star-9
- Type: Unmanned Aerial Vehicle
- National origin: North Korea
- Manufacturer: Korean People's Army Air Force
- Primary user: Korean People's Army Air Force

History
- Introduction date: 2022
- First flight: 2022
- In service: 2022-Present
- Developed from: MQ-9 Reaper

Saetbyol-9 (Korean: 샛별-9; lit. 'Morning Star-9') is a North Korean unmanned aerial vehicle (UAV) first publicly revealed in July 2023. It has been described by North Korean state media as a "multi-purpose attack drone" capable of both reconnaissance and strike missions.

== History ==
The UAV was first observed via satellite imagery at Panghyon Airbase in September 2022. It was officially unveiled during the military parade in Pyongyang on 27 July 2023, where it appeared alongside another UAV, the Saebyeol-4.

== Design ==
Analysts note that the Saetbyol-9 closely resembles the U.S. MQ-9 Reaper, leading to speculation that North Korea is imitating its design. Key assessed characteristics include:

- Approximate wingspan: ~21 m
- Length: ~9 m
- Wing and fuselage hardpoints visible for carrying bombs or missiles
- Likely reconnaissance and strike capability, though with less advanced avionics than U.S. UAVs

== Strategic significance ==
Analysts argue the Saetbyol-9 demonstrates Pyongyang’s intent to field more advanced UAVs, though its actual operational capability remains uncertain. The system may serve propaganda purposes by displaying parity with advanced foreign drones, while in practice being limited by weaker propulsion, communications, and sensor technology.

== See also ==
- Saebyeol-4
- Korean People's Army Air Force
- MQ-9 Reaper
