= Kyongsong Chuul Airport =

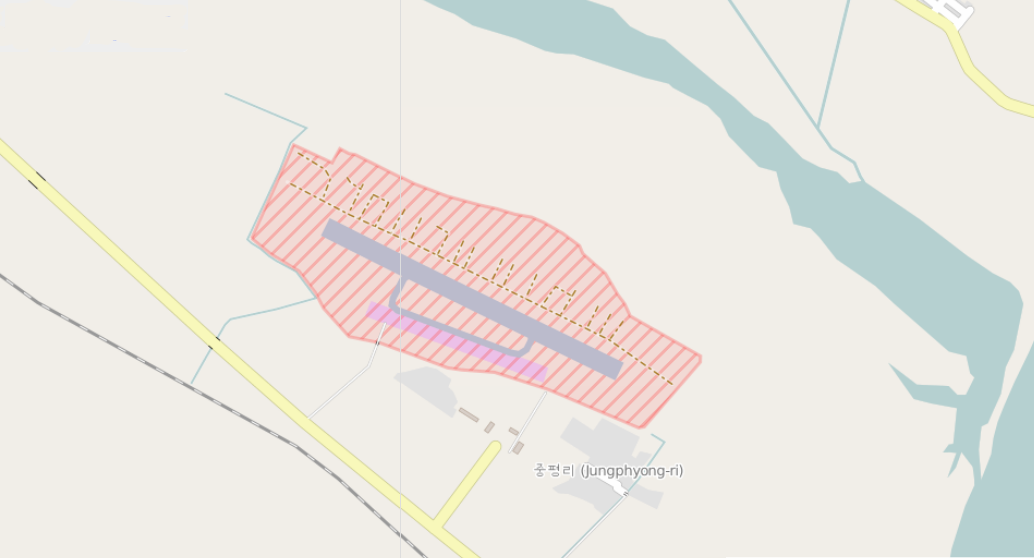
- IATA: N/A; ICAO: N/A; FAA LID: N/A

Summary
- Airport type: Military
- Serves: Kyongsong, North Korea
- Elevation AMSL: 3 ft / 1 m
- Coordinates: 41°33′37.60″N 129°37′50.10″E

Map

Runways
Direction	Length		Surface
Direction	ft	m	Surface
13/31	3,500	1,067	Asphalt

- Kyongsong Chuul Airport
- Chosŏn'gŭl: 경성주을비행장
- Hancha: 鏡城朱乙飛行場
- Revised Romanization: Gyeongseong Jueul bihaengjang
- McCune–Reischauer: Kyŏngsŏng Chuŭl pihaengjang

Kyongsong Chuul Airport was a military airport in Kyongsong-gun, Hamgyong-bukto, North Korea. It was subordinate to the 8th Air Transport Division and was home to an officer training school.

== Facilities ==
Prior to demolition, the airfield had a single asphalt runway 13/31 measuring 3500 x 200 feet (1067 x 61 m).

It was sited on the east coast of North Korea, a few miles north of the Orang Airport and south of the city of Chongjin.

== Current usage ==
Google Earth imagery from 2018 shows the airport is undergoing complete reconstruction.

The airport was demolished and became the Jungphyong Vegetable Greenhouse Farm and Tree Nursery in 2019.
