= Kuktong Airport =

- IATA: none; ICAO: none

Summary
- Airport type: Military
- Serves: Myonggan, North Korea
- Elevation AMSL: 125 ft / 38 m
- Coordinates: 41°14′59.00″N 129°33′49.20″E
- Interactive map of Kuktong Airport

Runways
Direction	Length		Surface
Direction	ft	m	Surface
10/28	3,750	1,143	Grass

- Kuktong Airport
- Chosŏn'gŭl: 극동비행장
- Hancha: 極洞飛行場
- Revised Romanization: Geukdong bihaengjang
- McCune–Reischauer: Kŭktong pihaengjang

Kuktong Airport is an airport near Kŭktong-rodongjagu in Myonggan County, Hamgyong-bukto, North Korea.

== Facilities ==
The airfield has a single grass runway 10/28 measuring 3750 x 164 feet (1143 x 50 m). It on the east coast of North Korea, approximately 20 km south of Orang Airport.
