= Sungam Ni Airport =

- IATA: N/A; ICAO: N/A; FAA LID: N/A

Summary
- Airport type: Military
- Serves: Chongjin, North Korea
- Elevation AMSL: 92 ft / 28 m
- Coordinates: 41°40′27.40″N 129°40′35.50″E

Map

Runways
Direction	Length		Surface
Direction	ft	m	Surface
14/32	2,950	899	Asphalt

- Sungam Ni Airport
- Chosŏn'gŭl: 승암리비행장
- Hancha: 勝岩里飛行場
- Revised Romanization: Seungam-ni bihaengjang
- McCune–Reischauer: Sŭngam-ni pihaengjang

Sungam Ni Airport is an airport in Sŭngam-rodongjagu, Kyongsong-gun, Hamgyong-bukto, North Korea.

== Facilities ==
The airfield has a single asphalt runway 14/32 measuring 2950 x 190 feet (899 x 58 m). It is sited along the east coast of North Korea.
