= Kangdong Airport =

- IATA: N/A; ICAO: N/A; FAA LID: N/A

Summary
- Airport type: Military
- Serves: Kangdong, North Korea
- Elevation AMSL: 75 ft / 23 m
- Coordinates: 39°09′29.60″N 126°02′25.40″E

Map

Runways
Direction	Length		Surface
Direction	ft	m	Surface
~~03/21~~	~~3,070~~	~~936~~	~~Asphalt~~

Kangdong Airport (강동비행장) was an airport near Kangdong in Pyongyang, North Korea.

== Facilities ==
The airfield sited about 29 km east-northeast of Pyongyang. It has a single asphalt runway 03/21 measuring 3070 x 112 feet (936 x 34 m), and has a parallel taxiway for most of the length of the runway.

== Current usage ==
The airport was demolished from 2020 to 2024.

A new greenhouse complex, named Kangdong Greenhouse Complex was opened on 15 March 2024. The opening ceremony was attended by Kim Jong Un and his daughter. It was built on the land of the old Kangdong Airport.
