= Kaechon Airport =

Airport in North Korea

Kaechan Airfield
- IATA: N/A; ICAO: N/A; FAA LID: N/A

Summary
- Airport type: Military
- Serves: Kaechon, North Korea
- Elevation AMSL: 33 ft / 10 m
- Coordinates: 39°45′12.50″N 125°54′09.10″E

Map

Runways
Direction	Length		Surface
Direction	ft	m	Surface
05/23	8,180	2,493	Concrete

Kaechon Airport(개천비행장) is an airport near Kaechon, Pyongannam-do, North Korea.

== Facilities ==
The airfield has a single concrete runway 05/23 measuring 8180 x 190 feet (2493 x 58 m). It has a parallel taxiway with earth aircraft revetments, and other taxiways leading southwest to tunnels in a nearby hill.
