= Taechon Airport =

- IATA: N/A; ICAO: N/A; FAA LID: N/A

Summary
- Airport type: Military
- Serves: Taechon, North Korea
- Elevation AMSL: 118 ft (36 m)
- Coordinates: 39°54′12.60″N 125°29′21.60″E

Map
- Location within North Korea Location within Asia Location within North Pacific Location within Earth

Runways
Direction	Length		Surface
Direction	ft	m	Surface
11/29	6,450	1,966	Asphalt

Taechon Airport(태천비행장) is an airport in Pyongan-bukto, North Korea.

== Facilities ==
The airfield has a single asphalt runway 11/29 measuring 6450 x 194 feet (1966 x 59 m). It is sited in a river plain, and has a full-length parallel taxiway which supports dispersed revetments.
