= Hwangsuwon Airport =

- IATA: none; ICAO: none

Summary
- Airport type: Military
- Serves: Kimhyonggwon, North Korea
- Elevation AMSL: 3,832 ft / 1,168 m
- Coordinates: 40°40′54.40″N 128°09′00.00″E

Map

Runways
Direction	Length		Surface
Direction	ft	m	Surface
14/32	9,500	2,896	Concrete

- Hwangsuwon Airport
- Hangul: 황수원비행장
- Hanja: 黃水院飛行場
- RR: Hwangsuwon bihaengjang
- MR: Hwangsuwŏn pihaengjang

Hwangsuwon Airport is an airport near Hwangsuwol-li in Kimhyonggwon-gun, Ryanggang-do, North Korea.

== Facilities ==
The airfield has a single concrete runway 14/32 measuring 9500 x 150 feet (2896 x 46 m). It is sited in a valley and has a full-length parallel taxiway with two aprons at the ends. It is also unique in that a taxiway leads nearly 2.8 kilometers to the south-southwest, accessing dispersed aprons. It is home to a fighter regiment of 44 MiG-21 jets.
