= Sonchon Airport =

- IATA: N/A; ICAO: N/A; FAA LID: N/A

Summary
- Airport type: Military
- Serves: Sonchon, North Korea
- Elevation AMSL: 198 ft / 60 m
- Coordinates: 39°55′07.30″N 124°50′26.70″E

Map

Runways
Direction	Length		Surface
Direction	ft	m	Surface
14/32	1,600	488	Concrete

Sonchon Airport(선천비행장) is an airport near Sonchon, Pyongan-bukto, North Korea.

== Facilities ==
The airfield has a single concrete runway 14/32 measuring 1600 x 102 feet (488 x 31 m). It is a base for military helicopters of the 2nd Air Combat Division's air regiment.
