= Toksan Airport =

- IATA: none; ICAO: none

Summary
- Airport type: Military
- Serves: Hamhung, North Korea
- Elevation AMSL: 210 ft / 64 m
- Coordinates: 39°59′49.50″N 127°36′44.30″E

Map

Runways
Direction	Length		Surface
Direction	ft	m	Surface
05/23	8,150	2,484	Concrete

- Toksan Airport
- Hangul: 덕산비행장
- Hanja: 德山飛行場
- RR: Deoksan bihaengjang
- MR: Tŏksan pihaengjang

Toksan Airport is an airport in Tŏksan-dong, Hamhŭng-si, Hamgyong-namdo, North Korea.

== Facilities ==
The airfield has a single concrete runway 05/23 measuring 8150 x 161 feet (2484 x 49 m). It is sited in a valley and has a full-length parallel taxiway. It is home to a fighter-bomber regiment of 24 MiG-21 jets.
