= Manpo Airport =

- IATA: none; ICAO: none

Summary
- Airport type: Military
- Serves: Manpo, North Korea
- Elevation AMSL: 837 ft (255 m)
- Coordinates: 41°08′24.70″N 126°21′26.40″E
- Interactive map of Manpo Airport

Runways
Direction	Length		Surface
Direction	ft	m	Surface
03/21	7,850	2,393	Grass

Manpo Airport(만포비행장) is an airport near Manpo, Chagang Province, North Korea.

== Facilities ==
The airfield has a single grass runway 03/21 measuring 7850 x 174 feet (2393 x 53 m). The northern half of the runway is bordered by earth aircraft revetments. It is only a few miles from the border with China. During the Korean War, the USAF designated this airfield as K-32 and Oesichon-dong.
