= Hwangju Airport =

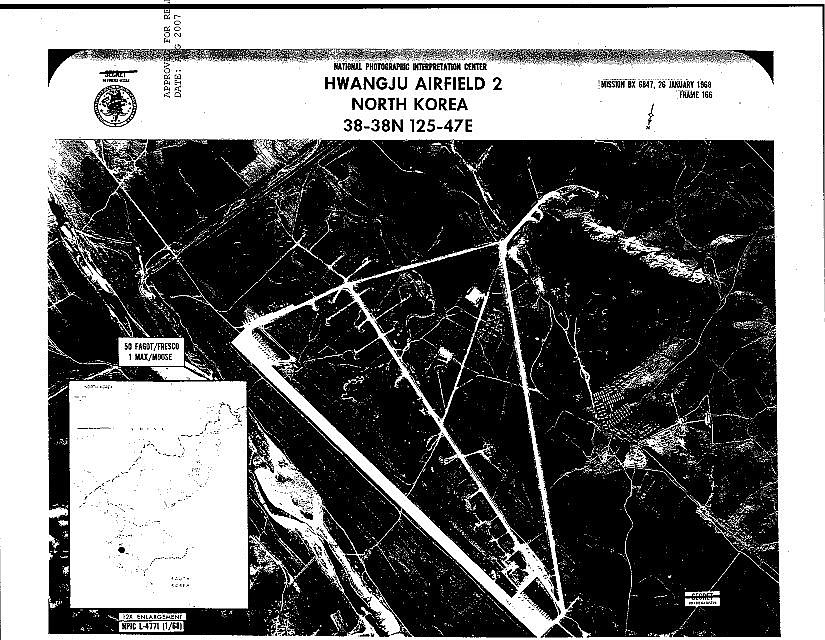
- IATA: none; ICAO: none

Summary
- Airport type: Military
- Serves: Hwangju, North Korea
- Elevation AMSL: 26 ft / 8 m
- Coordinates: 38°39′12.70″N 125°47′20.00″E

Map

Runways
Direction	Length		Surface
Direction	ft	m	Surface
12/30	8,180	2,493	Concrete

Hwangju Airport(황주비행장) is an airport near Hwangju, Hwanghae-bukto, North Korea.

== Facilities ==
The airfield has a single concrete runway 12/30 measuring 8180 × 154 feet (2493 × 47 m). It is sited in a valley and has several supporting taxiways and three aprons which adjoin the runway. It is home to a fighter regiment of 44 MiG-21 jets.
