= Kuum Ni Airport =

Kuum-Ni Airport
- IATA: N/A; ICAO: N/A; FAA LID: N/A

Summary
- Airport type: Military
- Serves: Tongchon, North Korea
- Elevation AMSL: 66 ft / 20 m
- Coordinates: 38°52′01.00″N 127°54′20.10″E

Map

Runways
Direction	Length		Surface
Direction	ft	m	Surface
06/24	8,150	2,484	Concrete

- Kuum Ni Airport
- Chosŏn'gŭl: 구읍리비행장
- Hancha: 舊邑里飛行場
- Revised Romanization: Gueum-ni bihaengjang
- McCune–Reischauer: Kuŭm-ni pihaengjang

Kuum-Ni is an airport near Kuŭm-ni (Kuŭp-ri), in Tongchon, Kangwon-do province, North Korea.

== Facilities ==
The airfield has a single concrete runway 06/24 measuring 8150 x 130 feet (2484 x 40 m). It has a full-length parallel taxiway, and several taxiways extending southwest to dispersed aircraft aprons and shelters carved out of a nearby hill.
