= Kwaksan Airport =

- IATA: none; ICAO: none

Summary
- Airport type: Military
- Serves: Kwaksan, North Korea
- Elevation AMSL: 62 ft / 19 m
- Coordinates: 39°43′54.90″N 125°06′38.60″E

Map

Runways
Direction	Length		Surface
Direction	ft	m	Surface
04/22	2,340	713	Asphalt

Kwaksan Airport(곽산비행장) is an airport in Pyongan-bukto, North Korea.

== Facilities ==
The airfield has a single asphalt runway 04/22 measuring 2340 x 92 feet (713 x 28 m). It has a partial parallel taxiway, and a fair amount of infrastructure leading to dispersed parking as far as 2 km southeast of the runway. It is home to a bomber regiment of 24 Ilyushin Il-28 jets.
