= Hyesan Airfield =

- IATA: N/A; ICAO: N/A; FAA LID: N/A

Summary
- Airport type: Military
- Serves: Hyesan, North Korea
- Elevation AMSL: 2,343 ft / 714 m
- Coordinates: 41°22′41.00″N 128°12′18.50″E
- Interactive map of Hyesan Airfield

Runways
Direction	Length		Surface
Direction	ft	m	Surface
06/24	4,540	1,384	Gravel

Hyesan Airfield (혜산비행장) is an airport near Hyesan, Ryanggang-do, North Korea.

== Facilities ==
The airfield has a single gravel runway 06/24 measuring 4540 x 105 feet (1384 x 32 m). However, another source reports it as 5282 x 206 feet (1610 x 63 m).

It is sited near the northern border with China. The facility was extensively improved in 1971, and there may have been further plans to pave the airfield, based on the continued presence of construction vehicles.
