= List of highway strips in North Korea =

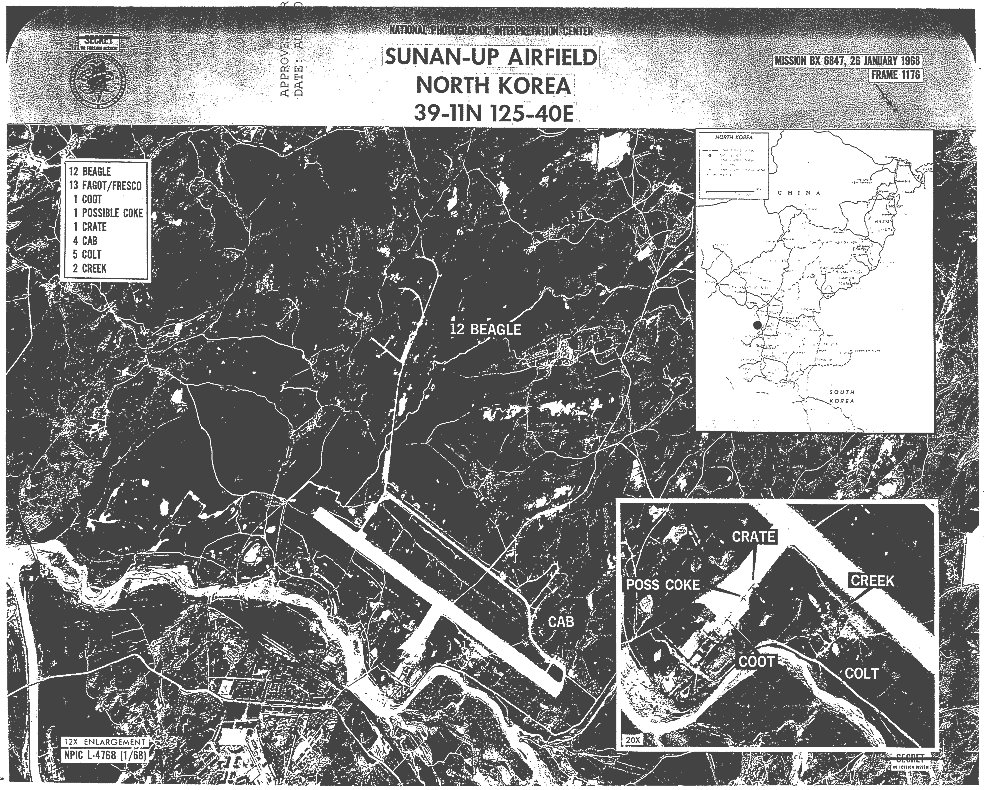
CIA image showing the Sunan-Up airstrip in 1968

North Korea has built dozens of reserve airstrips along highways and ordinary roads. These airfields are little more than widened sections of pavement that appear to be for emergency or backup use only and may not normally support operations. They are listed as "Highway" or "Highway Strip".

Highway airstrips in North Korea
Name	Runway	Dimensions (ft)	Dimensions (m)	Surface	Coordinates
Ayang Ni	10/28	6400 x 79	1951 x 24	Gravel	38°15′06.30″N 125°57′50.70″E
Changyon	14/32	2850 x 102	869 x 36	Grass	38°13′22.80″N 125°08′27.30″E
Chasan					
Kang Da Ri				Dirt	39°05′52.45″N 127°24′7.25″E
Kilchu	03/21	6640 x 102	2024 x 31	Dirt	40°55′04.00″N 129°18′34.90″E
Kojo				Dirt	38°50′32.00″N 127°52′23.00″E
Koksan South	01/19	6290 x 82	1917 x 25	Asphalt	38°43′56.20″N 126°39′35.40″E
Koksan South 2	12/30	3550 x 33	1082 x 10	Asphalt	38°39′14.20″N 126°41′06.10″E
Nuchon Ni	10/28	6450 x 85	1966 x 26	Asphalt	38°13′55.30″N 126°15′50.20″E
Okpyong Ni	06/24	1430 x 16	436 x 5	Grass	39°16′16.92″N 127°19′14.16″E
Panghyon South	12/30	5200 x 75	1585 x 23	Asphalt	39°53′00.10″N 125°09′25.50″E
Panghyon South 2	07/25	1850 x 52	564 x 16	Asphalt	39°48′49.30″N 125°08′59.70″E
Pyong Ni South	04/22	8420 x 49	2566 x 15	Asphalt	39°19′16.40″N 125°53′52.40″E
Sangwon	12/30	8140 x 69	2481 x 21	Asphalt	38°50′39.40″N 126°04′04.20″E
Sangwon Ni	14/32	6360 x 69	1939 x 21	Asphalt	40°07′23.30″N 125°52′15.70″E
Seanchan					
Singye					
Sinhung	04/22	7400 x 266	2256 x 81	Asphalt	40°10′51.80″N 127°32′22.50″E
Sunan-Up	02/20	7650 x 52	2332 x 16	Asphalt	39°15′17.20″N 125°42′19.60″E
Wong Yo Ri	01/19	6520 x 85	1987 x 26	Asphalt	38°35′39.90″N 126°31′35.50″E
Yong Hung					39°27′50.00″N 127°19′04.00″E

== See also ==
- List of airports in North Korea
- Transport in North Korea
