= Pyongyang International Airport =

Main airport serving Pyongyang, North Korea

Pyongyang International Airport 평양국제비행장

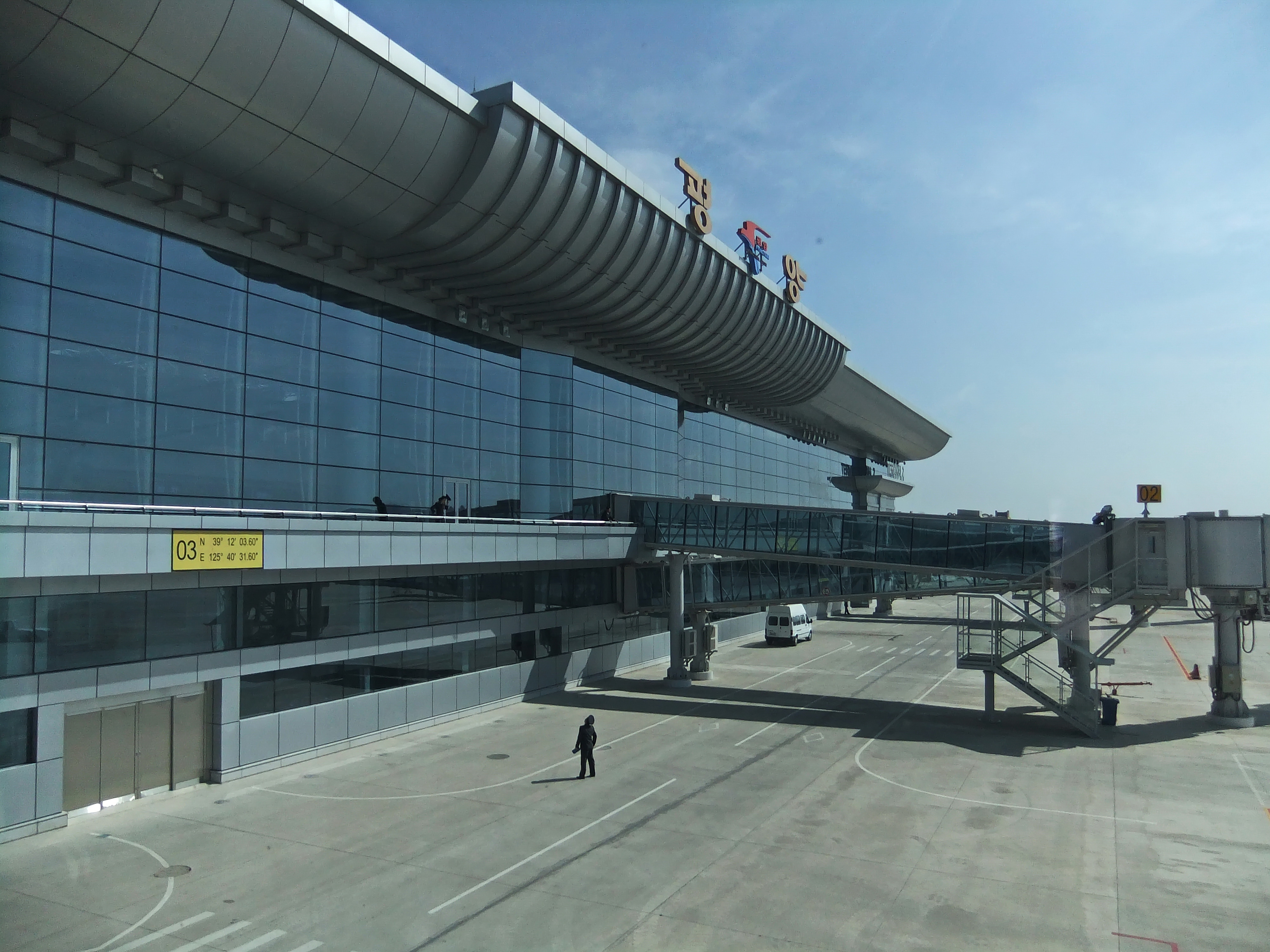
- Terminal 2
- IATA: FNJ; ICAO: ZKPY; WMO: 47058

Summary
- Airport type: Public
- Owner: Government of North Korea
- Operator: Civil Aviation Administration of Korea
- Serves: Pyongyang, North Korea
- Location: Ryongbung-ri, Sunan District, Pyongyang, North Korea
- Hub for: Air Koryo
- Elevation AMSL: 111 ft (34 m)
- Coordinates: 39°13′26″N 125°40′12″E

Map
- Location in North Korea

Runways
Direction	Length		Surface
Direction	m	ft	Surface
01/19	4,000	13,123	Concrete
17/35	3,425	11,237	Concrete
- Sources: U.S. DoD FLIP

- Pyongyang International Airport
- Hangul: 평양국제비행장
- Hanja: 平壤國際飛行場
- Lit.: Pyongyang International Airfield
- RR: Pyeongyang gukje bihaengjang
- MR: P'yŏngyang kukche pihaengjang

Pyongyang International Airport (Korean: 평양국제비행장) (IATA: FNJ, ICAO: ZKPY), also known as Pyongyang Sunan International Airport (Korean: 평양 순안 국제공항; Hanja: 平壤 順安 國際空港), is the sole international airport serving Pyongyang, the capital of North Korea and located in the city's Sunan District.

== History ==
=== Early years ===
During the period of Japanese rule, two airports were built in Pyongyang. Pyongyang Air Base was built by the Empire of Japan in the 1940s and remained in use until the 1950s. A second airport, Mirim Airport, was also built by the forces of the empire of Japan in the 1940s, east of the Taedong River. However, after World War II there was a need for a newer airport, and Sunan Airfield was built. Mirim Airport survived as a military airfield, and Pyongyang Air Base was re-developed for government use and for housing.

During the Korean War, the airport was occupied by United Nations forces for seven weeks in late 1950, when the forces flew large amounts of supplies to Sunan. On 13 May 1953, the airport was inundated when the United States Air Force bombed Toksan Dam. After an armistice was signed, two months later, the North Korean Government began repairing and expanding the airport.

The Soviet airline Aeroflot flew to Moscow and Khabarovsk in the 1980s. In the 1990s, Air Koryo also provided nonstop flights to Moscow, which continued on to Berlin, Prague and Sofia.

During the 1989 13th World Festival of Youth and Students held in Pyongyang, a temporary terminal building was erected to accommodate the arrival of the festival's international attendees.

=== Post-2000s ===
Russian Sky Airlines operated charter services to Pyongyang from Russian destinations in the mid-2000s on Il-62M and Il-86 aircraft. China Southern Airlines offered scheduled charter flights to and from Beijing during the peak season only, and permanently stopped its flights in October 2006. Air China re-established service to Beijing on a Boeing 737, three days a week in March 2008, and suspended due to lack of demand in November 2017. Air Koryo, Korean Air and Asiana Airlines also provided chartered flight services to Seoul and Yangyang, on the east coast of South Korea, from Pyongyang. These flights were used by Koreans visiting relatives across the border; these services were halted after the ending of the Sunshine Policy by South Korea in 2008. Air China resumed service from Beijing Capital Airport to Pyongyang in June 2018.

An interim facility handling international flights had been built just south of the existing terminal by early 2011. The existing terminal was deemed by North Korean leader Kim Jong Un too small and outdated, resulting in its demolition by early 2012. He ordered the construction of a new terminal in July 2012. Besides this, a new control tower and VIP terminal north of the main terminal were also built. The project became part of a "speed campaign", in which thousands of workers were enlisted to complete it quickly.

The airport was closed to international travel in 2020 because of the COVID-19 pandemic, and reopened in 2023 with the resumption of Air Koryo flights to Beijing and Vladivostok. However, on 25 July and 26, before it did, a Russian Special Air Squadron Il-96 and Air China government-chartered 737 arrived, carrying Russian and Chinese officials to personally meet Kim Jong Un and attend a ICBM fair. In July 2025, Nordwind Airlines began regularly scheduled service to Moscow-Sheremetyevo, operating only once a month initially before gradually increasing to twice a week.

== Infrastructure ==
External videos
- Terminal Service Base of Pyongyang International Airport

=== Terminals ===
Pyongyang International Airport has two passenger terminals. Terminal 1 opened in January 2016 and handles domestic flights only. It is connected to Terminal 2, the international terminal, which was inaugurated on 1 July 2015. Terminal 2 has jet bridges and at least 12 check-in counters. Amenities include a duty-free shop, coffee bar, newsstand and Internet room, along with a snack bar, a pharmacy, a CD/DVD shop and an electronics shop. There is also a business-class lounge with a buffet on the upper level, along with an outdoor viewing area. During the construction period, a hangar-like structure served the airport with baggage carousel, a duty-free shop and a bookshop/souvenir shop.

Accommodations

Currently, there are no hotels or rest facilities at Pyongyang Sunan International Airport, considered relatively unusual for capital airports. This is likely due to its small passenger traffic and lack of layovers not warranting such a facility.

=== Runways ===
The airport has two functioning runways: one is designated 17/35 and measures 3,425 by 60 metres (11,237 ft × 197 ft), while the other, designated 01/19, measures 4,000 by 60 metres (13,120 ft × 200 ft).

=== Maintenance ===
Yonhap reported in September 2016 that a maintenance facility had been built at the Pyongyang airport. About 1 km from runway 17/35, the facility includes aircraft hangars and apartment buildings for high-ranking officials and Air Koryo employees.

Security

Beyond state-restricted sites like official residences and prison camps, Sunan International Airport ranks as North Korea’s most secure facility. Its status as the country’s only major intercontinental gateway makes it vital for national security and economic integration. Accordingly, the airport remains under 24/7 heavy military guard. This high-security posture is compounded by the airport’s role as the primary route for leaving the country, making it a persistent target for defection attempts, which were notably frequent during the 1990s.

== Airlines and destinations ==
Airlines	Destinations
Air China	Beijing–Capital
Air Koryo	Beijing–Capital, Chongjin, Hamhung, Samjiyon, Shenyang, Vladivostok, Wonsan
Nordwind Airlines	Moscow–Sheremetyevo

== Accidents and incidents ==
- On 16 February 1958, a Douglas DC-3 of Korean National Airlines was hijacked on a flight from Busan to Seoul by 8 hijackers demanding to be taken to North Korea and landed here. All 34 occupants survived.
- On 31 March 1970, a Boeing 727-89 of JAL (JA8315) was hijacked on a flight from Tokyo to Fukuoka by 9 hijackers demanding to be taken to North Korea and landed here. All 115 occupants survived.
- On 15 August 2006, a Tupolev Tu-154B-2 of Air Koryo (possibly P-561) suffered minor damage in a non-fatal runway mishap on landing from Beijing and was later repaired.
- On 15 September 2017, about 6:30am KST, North Korea fired a Hwasong-12 missile from the airport. The missile travelled 3,700 kilometers (2,300 mi) and reached a maximum height of 770 kilometers (480 mi).

== Ground transportation ==
The airport is about 25 kilometres (16 mi) from the city, about 30 minutes' drive by the Pyongyang-Hicheon Expressway. In addition, Sunan Station, on the Pyongui Line of the Korean State Railway, is 800 meters (2,600 ft) from the Pyongyang airport terminal building.

== See also ==
- Transport in North Korea
- Wonsan Kalma International Airport
