= Kalma Airport =

Airport in Wonsan, North Korea

Kalma Airport in Wonsan
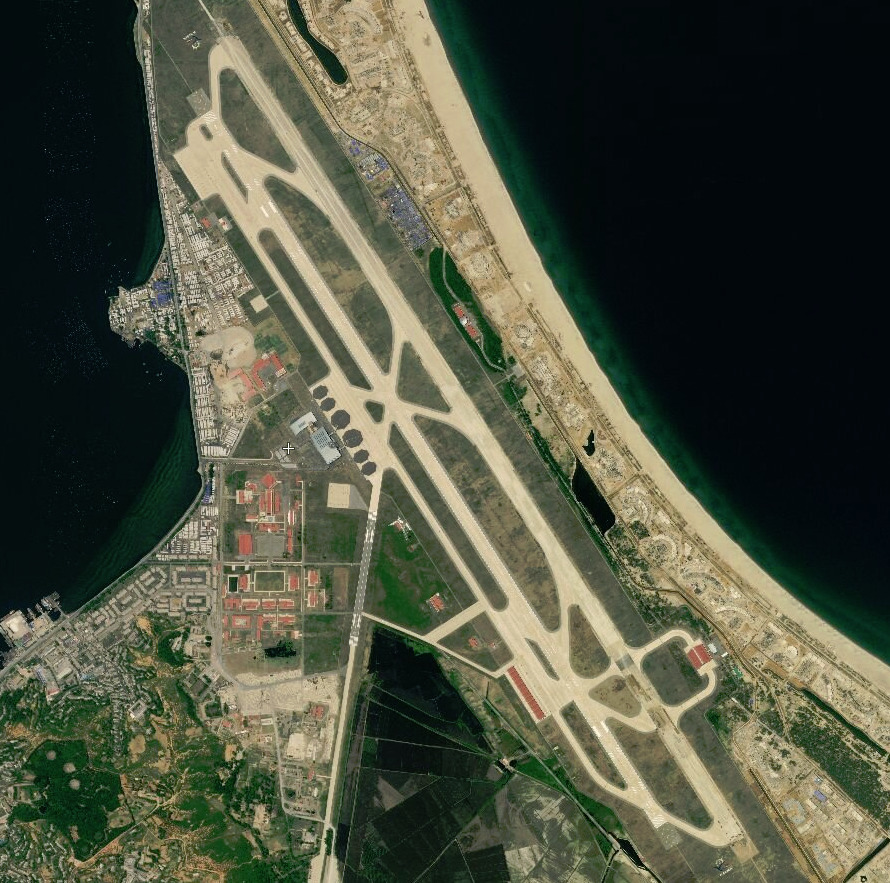
- IATA: WOS; ICAO: ZKWS

Summary
- Airport type: Military/Public
- Owner: Government of North Korea
- Operator: Civil Aviation Administration of Korea
- Serves: Wonsan; Munchon; Anbyon
- Location: Wonsan, Kangwon-do, North Korea
- Opened: September 24, 2015 (commercial flights)
- Coordinates: 39°9′59″N 127°29′3″E

Map
- Location in North Korea

Runways
Direction	Length		Surface
Direction	ft	m	Surface
15R/33L	10,252	3,125	Concrete
15L/33R	11,482	3,500	Concrete
02/20	1,640	500	Asphalt

- Kalma Airport
- Hangul: 갈마비행장
- Hanja: 葛麻飛行場
- RR: Galma bihaengjang
- MR: Kalma pihaengjang

Kalma Airport (IATA: WOS, ICAO: ZKWS) is a dual-use civil and military airport in Wonsan, Kangwon-do, North Korea. An international terminal and passenger ramp opened in September 2015.

== History ==
=== Korean War ===
The Republic of Korea Army Capital Division captured Wonsan Airfield on 10 October 1950. On 13 October, Major General Field Harris, commander of the 1st Marine Air Wing, flew into the airfield, followed the next day by VMF-312 and other elements of Marine Aircraft Group 12. The airfield was used by the United States Marine Corps and USAF under the designation K-25. By 12 October the USAF's Cargo Combat Command was flying supplies into the airfield.

UN forces evacuated Wonsan in December 1950. The Blockade of Wonsan rendered the airfield unusable for the remainder of the war.

=== Modernisation ===
In July 2013, Kim Jong Un approved plans for a complete redesign of the airport, turning it into an international airport for civilian use. The new airport was designed by the Chinese architectural firm PLT Planning & Architecture. The redesign will include two 3,340-square-metre oval-shaped terminals, one serving domestic flights and one serving international flights, that will each contain six gates and several duty-free stores. The runways will also be extended to 3500 metres. It is expected to cost US$200 million.

On 24 September 2015, the first commercial civilian flight landed at Wonsan Airport as a part of an aviation-related tour with thirty passengers. Photographs of the inaugural flight reveal a very much redesigned terminal building, doing away with the original dual-terminal circular layout. The new terminal has a single L-shaped building.

It is reported that the airport cost around $200 million to build, with most of the work being carried out by the military. In July 2015, the first major event, an aeronautics display and contest, took place at the airport.

In September 2016, the Wonsan Air Festival took place for the first time, with the Korean People's Army Air Force and the North Korean airline Air Koryo displaying a number of their aircraft. A second edition was planned for September 2017 but it was cancelled amidst international tensions.

Asiana Airlines became the first foreign airline to operate to the newly reconstructed airport at Wonsan. Air Koryo previously operated charter services from the original Wonsan Airport to South Korea prior to the end of the Sunshine policy.

In July 2018, a C-17 of the US Air Force's 204th Airlift Squadron collected 55 cases of human remains from Wonsan. It is thought that these are remains of US or other UN servicemen from the Korean War. The C-17 then flew to Osan Air Base in South Korea.

In April 2026, satellite imagery showed that the runway was extended and the airport went through upgrade and expansion.

== Infrastructure ==
Wonsan Airport has two runways. A new runway was constructed parallel to the existing main runway, which is 375 metres longer. The existing runway was converted into a taxiway. A new terminal opened in 2015 to allow the airport to serve commercial passenger flights. The new construction features 2 jetbridges and a newly designed apron that can accommodate 12 commercial aircraft at any one time.

== Airlines and destinations ==
Airlines	Destinations
Air Koryo	Pyongyang
