= Sondok Airport =

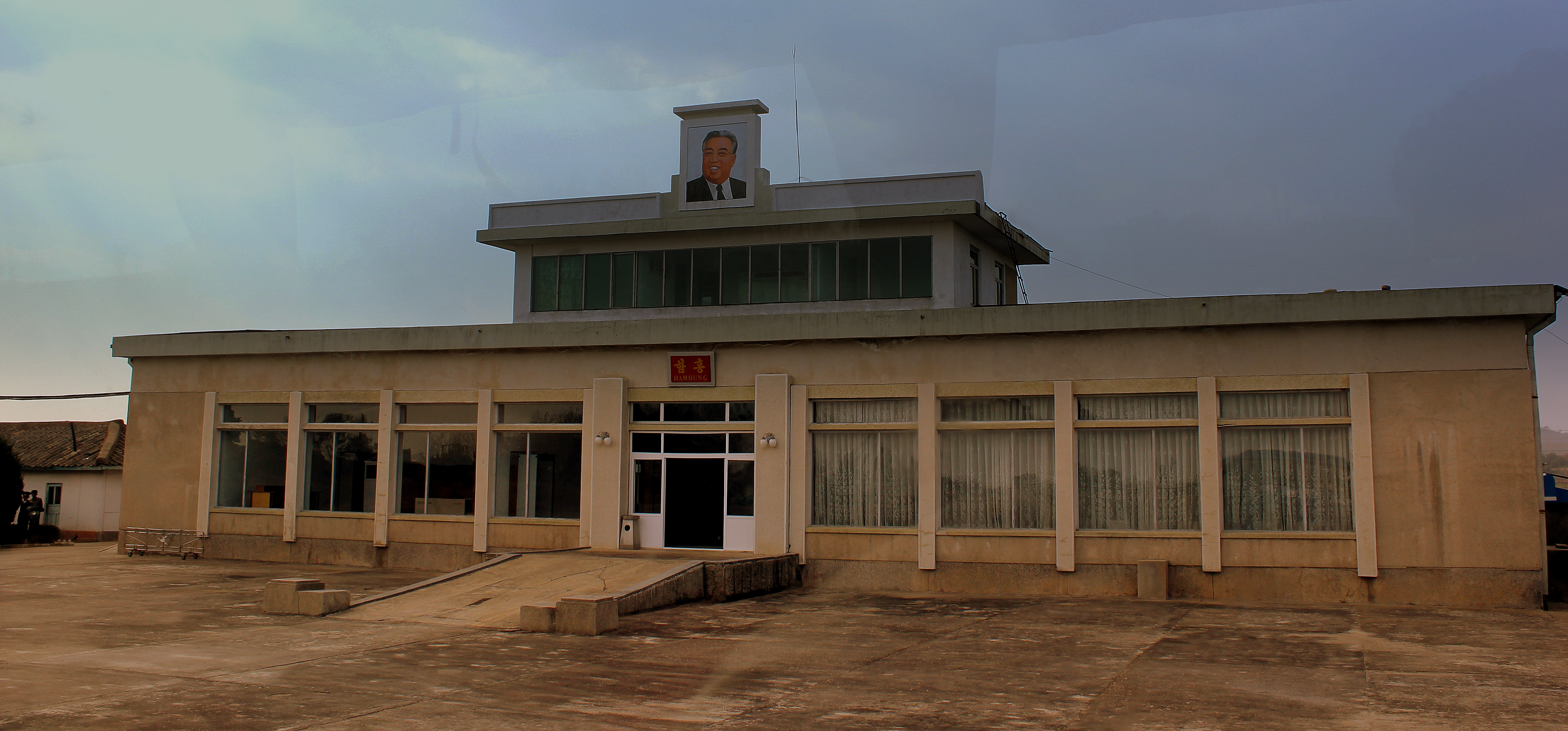
- IATA: DSO; ICAO: ZKSD

Summary
- Airport type: Military/Public
- Owner: Government of North Korea
- Operator: Civil Aviation Administration of Korea
- Serves: Hamhung, North Korea
- Location: Chongpyong, North Korea
- Elevation AMSL: 7 ft (2.1 m)
- Coordinates: 39°44′50.40″N 127°28′28.60″E

Map
- Location in North Korea

Runways
Direction	Length		Surface
Direction	ft	m	Surface
02/20	8,210	2,502	Concrete

- Sondok Airport
- Hangul: 선덕비행장
- Hanja: 宣德飛行場
- RR: Seondeok bihaengjang
- MR: Sŏndŏk pihaengjang

Sondok Airport (IATA: DSO, ICAO: ZKSD) is an airport in Sŏndŏng-ni, Chŏngp'yŏng-gun, Hamgyong-namdo, North Korea. It is located at latitude 39.745201, longitude 127.473999.

== History ==
During the Korean War, it was designated as K-26 by the USAF and was the target of one of Task Force 77's largest strikes during July 1953. The Korean Air Lines hijacked YS-11 aircraft landed at the airport in 1969. In 2002, Air Koryo operated services between Sondok Airport and Yangyang Airport in South Korea.

== Facilities ==
The airfield has a single concrete runway 02/20 measuring 8210 x 164 feet (2502 x 50 m). It has a full-length parallel taxiway and a large apron on the north side. It is home to a bomber regiment of 24 Ilyushin Il-28 jets, and 40 Antonov An-2s.

== Airlines and destinations ==
Airlines	Destinations
Air Koryo	Pyongyang
