= Orang Airport =

Airport near Chongjin, North Korea

- IATA: RGO; ICAO: ZKHM

Summary
- Airport type: Military/Public
- Owner: Government of North Korea
- Operator: Civil Aviation Administration of Korea
- Serves: Chongjin, North Korea
- Elevation AMSL: 10 ft (3.0 m)
- Coordinates: 41°25′45″N 129°38′54″E

Map
- Location within North Korea

Runways
Direction	Length		Surface
Direction	ft	m	Surface
04/22	8,200	2,500	Concrete

- Orang Airport
- Hangul: 어랑비행장
- Hanja: 漁郞飛行場
- RR: Eorang bihaengjang
- MR: Ŏrang pihaengjang

Orang Airport (IATA: RGO, ICAO: ZKHM) is a small airport located in Orang County, approximately 40 kilometres south of Chongjin, North Hamgyong in North Korea. Built by the Imperial Japanese Army, designated as K-33 (Hoemun Airfield) by the USAF during the Korean War, Orang Airport is now controlled by the Korean People's Army. Hoemun Airfield was renamed when the original Chongin Airfield K-34 was abandoned after the Korean War. The airport is normally used by the military, though a small number of commercial passenger flights also operate there. The airport also serves Rason, which is about a three-hour drive away.

== History ==
The airport was built by the Japanese military during the Japanese colonial period. At the time of construction, Chongjin Airport already existed near downtown Chongjin. Because the administrative district at the time was Hoemun-dong, Jubuk-myeon, Gyeongseong County, it was called Hoemun Airport (會文飛行場).

During the Korean War, the U.S Air Force designated this airfield "K-33" and Chongjin Airport "K-34". However, due to the destruction of Chongjin Airport and the surrounding downtown area by U.S air raids, this airport, located far from downtown Chongjin, is now used as the city's airport.

== Facilities ==
There is one runway in the airport, originally 1,200m long, which was extended to 2,500m. There is no arrival terminal, baggage is given directly from the trolley. One bus can carry arriving passengers from the runway to the single, rather departures-related building, if the flight is full some passengers can walk. Departure terminal "building" has a waiting lounge (for about 20 people), 1 check-in desk, one security scanner and an old Czechoslovak scale. There are very basic toilets. There are plans to further extend the runway to 4,000m to allow it to serve as a second international gateway to North Korea.

== Airlines and destinations ==
Airlines	Destinations
Air Koryo	Pyongyang

== See also ==
- Transportation in North Korea
