= Asset management in Malaysia =

All asset management companies, also known as AMCs, in Malaysia are overseen by the Malaysian Investment Development Authority (MIDA). AMC is generally an asset management / investment management company/firm that invests the pooled funds of investors in securities in line with the stated investment objectives.

== Enforced by SC ==
The Securities Commission Malaysia (SC) is the enforcer of the available legislation in the asset management industry. The following Acts are the most important in terms of regulatory framework regarding trusts in Malaysia: the Securities Commission Act, the Capital Markets and Services Act, the Securities Industry Act or the Futures Securities Act.

Asset management companies in Malaysia are subject to a set of rules imposed by the Securities Commission. In the development of their activities, they must have a supervision and control system, act in the best interest of their clients, and have a good business conduct.

== Investment fee in Malaysia ==
AMC in Malaysia provide their investment services for a fee. They charge commission fees for each transaction you make. That means that when you buy shares, you get charged. When you sell your shares, you also get charged.

For a fee, the company/firm provides more diversification, liquidity, and professional management consulting services than are normally available to individual investors. The diversification of portfolio is done by investing in such securities which are inversely correlated to each other. Money is collected from investors by way of floating various collective investment schemes, e.g. mutual fund schemes. In general, an AMC is a company that is engaged primarily in the business of investing in, and managing, portfolios of securities.

== Largest companies ==
The following is a list of the top AMCs located in Malaysia (as of 2018):

Firm/company	Country
Aberdeen Standard Investments	UK
Standard Life Aberdeen	UK
BlackRock	United States
The Vanguard Group	United States
State Street Global Advisors	United States
Fidelity Investments	United States

== List of AMCs within S.E.A ==
=== Asia ===
- Aberdeen Asset Management
- Aberdeen Standard Investments
- Affin Hwang Asset Management Berhad
- Asia Frontier Capital Ltd.
- Capital Dynamics
- Conning & Company
- IDFC Project Equity
- Investcorp
- Mirae Asset Financial Group
- Nomura Group
- Standard Life Aberdeen
- SinoPac Financial Holdings
- Value Partners

=== Australia ===
- Aberdeen Asset Management
- Aberdeen Standard Investments
- Standard Life Aberdeen
- AMP Capital
- Macquarie Group

== See also ==
- List of investment banks
- List of private equity firms
