= Asset management in Singapore =

All asset management companies (AMC) in Singapore are regulated by the Monetary Authority of Singapore (MAS). AMC is a company/firm that invests the pooled funds of investors in securities and other asset classes in line with the stated investment objectives. Their typical investments can include private equity, venture capital, hedge funds, real estate, stocks, bonds and other assets.

== Regulated by MAS ==
To conduct the regulated activity of fund management, the AMC will need to apply for a license from MAS.

== Investment fee in Singapore ==
AMC in Singapore provide their investment services for a fee. Some charge commission for each transaction you make while others charge a fee based on your assets under management with them.

In general, an AMC is a company that is engaged primarily in the business of investing in, and managing, investment portfolios.

== Largest companies ==
The following is a list of the top 5 AMCs located in Singapore (as of 2017):

Firm/company	Country
Standard Life Aberdeen	UK
BlackRock	United States
The Vanguard Group	United States
UBS	Switzerland
State Street Global Advisors	United States
Fidelity Investments	United States

== Notable AMCs with operations in Singapore ==
=== Asia ===
- Aberdeen Asset Management
- Affin Hwang Capital
- Aravest
- BNY Mellon Investment Management
- Capital Dynamics
- Eastspring Investments
- Fullerton Fund Management
- Granite Asia
- IDFC Project Equity
- Investcorp
- Lighthouse Canton
- Mirae Asset Group
- Nomura Group
- Rivulets Investments
- SC Capital
- Seviora Group
- SinoPac Financial Holdings
- Value Partners
- Vertex Holdings

== See also ==
- List of asset management firms
- List of investment banks
- List of private equity firms
