= Visa policy of Malaysia =

Policy on permits required to enter Malaysia and its external territories

Most visitors to Malaysia may enter without a visa for up to 14, 30 or 90 days, depending on their nationality.

However, citizens from certain countries must obtain an e-Visa or, if they are not eligible, obtain a visa from one of the Malaysian diplomatic missions.

== Entry requirements ==
All visitors to Malaysia must:

- hold a passport, passport replacing document or a travel document valid for at least 6 months (Note: Citizens of Singapore using the "Malaysia Automated Clearance System (MACS 2.0)" may enter Malaysia with a passport valid for at least 3 months.) upon arrival;
- hold a return ticket;
- not be an illegal immigrant;
- have sufficient funds for the duration of stay in Malaysia;
- have a visa and/or a yellow fever vaccination certificate (if applicable).

=== Malaysia Digital Arrival Card (MDAC) ===
Before entering Malaysia, all travellers, except

- citizens of Singapore; and
- diplomatic and official passport holders, regardless of nationality; and
- residents (Malaysian citizens, Permanent Residents and Long-Term Pass holders); and
- holders of a Bruneian General Certificate of Identity (GCI); and
- users of the "Brunei-Malaysia Frequent Travel Facility"; and
- holders of a border pass issued by Thailand; and
- holders of an Indonesian cross-border travel document (PLB);

are required to submit a Malaysia Digital Arrival Card online to Malaysia Immigration within three days before the date of arrival in Malaysia.

However, Malaysian authorities have warned that visitors should be vigilant against fraudulent websites that impersonate the official MDAC website, as such fraudulent websites may lead to scam and personal data breach. The registration for MDAC is completely free of charge.

== Visa policy map ==
Visa policy of Malaysia Malaysia Visa not required (90 days) Visa not required (30 days) Visa not required (14 days) eVisa Visa required Visa required (may enter by airport only) Admission refused

== Visa exemption ==
According to Timatic, citizens of the following countries and territories may enter Malaysia without a visa for the following period:

90 days

- All European Union member states
- All European Free Trade Association member states
- (Cooperation Council for the Arab States of the Gulf) All Gulf Cooperation Council member states

- Albania
- Algeria
- Argentina
- Australia
- Bosnia and Herzegovina
- Brazil
- Canada
- Cuba
- Egypt
- Hong Kong^{1}
- Japan
- Jordan
- Kyrgyzstan
- Lebanon
- Maldives
- Morocco
- New Zealand
- Peru
- San Marino
- South Africa
- South Korea
- Sudan
- Syria
- Tunisia
- Turkey
- Turkmenistan
- United Kingdom
- United States
- Uruguay
- Yemen

30 days

- All ASEAN member states (except Myanmar)

- Andorra
- Antigua and Barbuda
- Armenia
- Azerbaijan
- Bahamas
- Barbados
- Belarus
- Belize
- Benin
- Bolivia
- Botswana
- Cape Verde
- Chad
- Chile
- China^{1} ^{2}
- Comoros
- Costa Rica
- Dominica
- Dominican Republic
- Ecuador
- El Salvador
- Eswatini
- Fiji
- Gabon
- Gambia
- Georgia
- Grenada
- Guatemala
- Guinea
- Guyana
- Haiti
- Honduras
- India^{3}
- Iraq
- Jamaica
- Kazakhstan
- Kenya
- Kiribati
- Kosovo
- Lesotho
- Libya
- Macau^{1}
- Madagascar
- Malawi
- Marshall Islands
- Mauritania
- Mauritius
- Mexico
- Micronesia
- Moldova
- Monaco
- Mongolia
- Namibia
- Nauru
- Nicaragua
- North Macedonia
- Palau
- Palestine
- Panama
- Papua New Guinea
- Paraguay
- Russia
- Saint Kitts and Nevis
- Saint Lucia
- Saint Vincent and the Grenadines
- Samoa
- São Tomé and Príncipe
- Senegal
- Seychelles
- Sierra Leone
- Solomon Islands
- Somalia
- South Sudan
- Suriname
- Taiwan
- Tajikistan
- Tanzania
- Togo
- Tonga
- Trinidad and Tobago
- Tuvalu
- Uganda
- Ukraine
- Uzbekistan
- Vanuatu
- Vatican City
- Venezuela
- Zambia
- Zimbabwe

14 days

- Iran
- Macau^{4}
- Myanmar

_{1 - For Chinese citizens with People's Republic of China passports, Hong Kong Special Administrative Region passports or Macao Special Administrative Region passports only.}
_{2 - Limited to a maximum cumulative stay of 90 days within any 180-day period.}
_{3 - Temporary measure until 31 December 2026.}
_{4 - For holders of Macao Special Administrative Region Travel Permit regardless of their nationality.}

According to Timatic, citizens of Brunei and Singapore "may apply to extend their stay upon arrival" in Malaysia. Whilst the Immigration Department of Malaysia states that these nationals may stay more than 1 month without a visa, the legal procedure for these nationals to extend their stay has not been publicly disclosed, and the Ministry of Foreign Affairs of Singapore maintains that nationals of Singapore may only stay in Malaysia for a maximum stay of 30 days.

=== Non-ordinary passports ===
Holders of diplomatic or official / service passports of European Union member states, ASEAN member states, Andorra, Albania (90 days), Algeria (90 days), Armenia, Azerbaijan, Bangladesh, Bahrain, Belarus (90 days), Barbados (90 days), Belize (90 days), Botswana, China, Dominican Republic, Georgia, India, Iran (15 days), Jordan (90 days), Kazakhstan, Libya, Monaco, Moldova, Nicaragua, Pakistan, Saudi Arabia (90 days), San Marino (90 days), Tajikistan, Turkmenistan, Taiwan, Timor-Leste, United Arab Emirates, Uruguay, United Kingdom (90 days) and Vatican City may enter Malaysia without a visa for up to 30 days (unless otherwise noted).

=== APEC Business Travel Card ===
Holders of passports issued by the following countries who possess an APEC Business Travel Card (ABTC) containing the "MYS" code on the reverse, which indicates that it is valid for travel to Malaysia, may enter Malaysia without a visa for business purposes for up to 60 days.

ABTCs are issued to citizens of:

- Australia
- Brunei
- Chile
- China
- Hong Kong
- Indonesia
- Japan
- South Korea
- Mexico
- New Zealand
- Papua New Guinea
- Peru
- Philippines
- Russia
- Singapore
- Taiwan
- Thailand
- Vietnam

=== Eligible international organizations ===
Individuals holding the following travel documents are not required to obtain a visa for visits of 90 days or less when entering Malaysia:

- United Nations Passport Holders
- Interpol Passport Holders

== Electronic visa (e-Visa) ==
Malaysia Electronic Visa Facilitation & Services
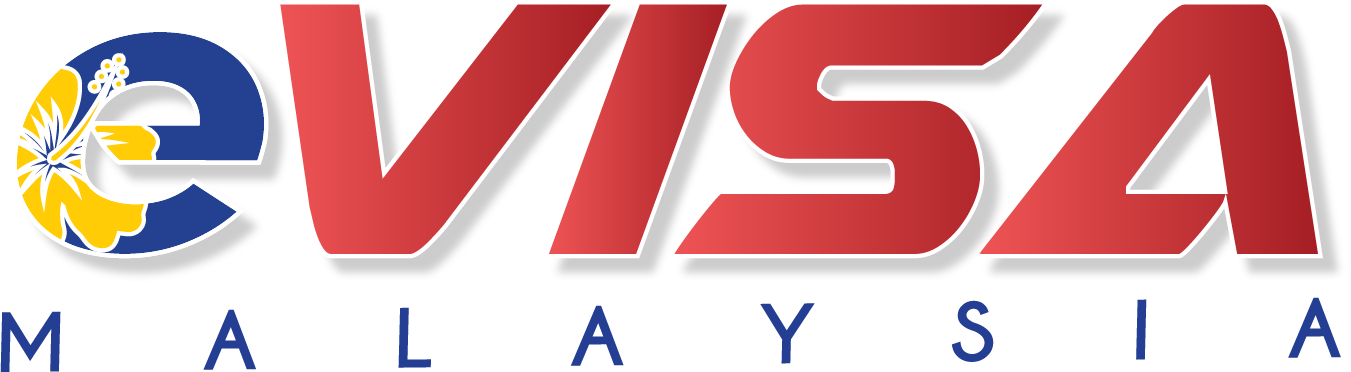

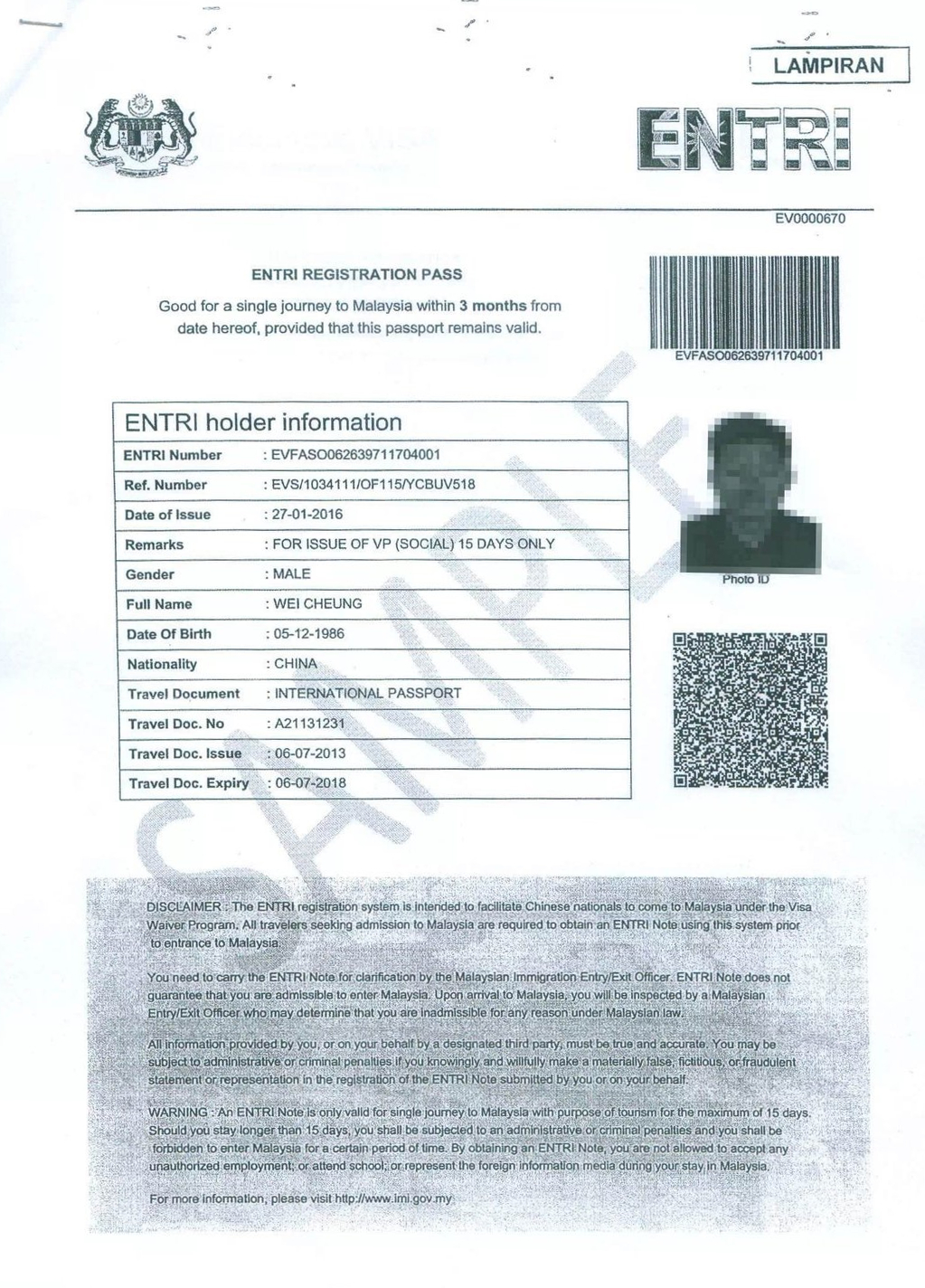
- Sample of ENTRI
- Owner: Immigration Department of Malaysia
- Website: malaysiavisa.imi.gov.my

On 1 March 2017, Malaysian government set up a new online application system to accept applications for Electronic Visa (eVISA) and Electronic Travel Registration and Information (ENTRI) to facilitate tourism.

The eNTRI program is designed for Chinese and Indian passport holders and lasts until 31 December, 2020, while the e-Visa is intended for citizens of additional countries and is still available.

e-Visa applications also applies to those seeking student or expatriate visas for entering Malaysia, although they must report to immigration authorities upon arrival in Malaysia in order to obtain their immigration passes.

Citizens of the following countries can apply for an e-Visa:

- Afghanistan
- Angola
- Bangladesh
- Bhutan
- Burkina Faso
- Burundi
- Cameroon
- Central African Republic
- Colombia
- Republic of the Congo
- DR Congo
- Djibouti
- Equatorial Guinea
- Eritrea
- Ethiopia
- Ghana
- Guinea Bissau
- Ivory Coast
- Liberia
- Mali
- Montenegro
- Mozambique
- Nepal
- Niger
- Nigeria
- Pakistan
- Rwanda
- Serbia
- Sri Lanka

In addition, holders of Hong Kong Document of Identity for Visa Purposes are eligible for applying e-Visa regardless of their nationality.

- Place of application: all countries and territories in the world except Israel, Malaysia and North Korea
  - As of 22 February 2023, Single Entry Visa (SEV) and Multiple Entry Visa (MEV) applications are now available in Singapore for all nationalities that require an eVISA.
  - The website uses IP address detection. Applicants outside designated countries (see above) will be blocked from applying.
- Fee: varies by nationality and applicant's location
- Place of departure: no restrictions
- Port of entry and exit: any port of entry
- Valid for: 3 months (multiple entries for Indian nationals, single entry for others)
- Duration of stay: 30 days for single-entry eVisa holders, 15 or 30 days for multiple-entry e-Visa holders
- Visa review: 2 business day after application submitted, visa interview or extra proof materials may be requested

== Direct airside transit ==
Nationals of non-visa-exempt countries can transit through Kuala Lumpur International Airport for a maximum of 24 hours in the transit area; however, they are not permitted to switch between the terminals of the airport unless they hold a valid visa.

== Mandatory yellow fever vaccination ==
Nationals of the following countries require an International Certificate of Vaccination in order to enter Malaysia: The vaccination requirement is imposed by this country for protection against Yellow Fever since the principal mosquito vector Aedes aegypti is present in its territory.

- Angola
- Argentina
- Benin
- Bolivia
- Brazil
- Burkina Faso
- Burundi
- Cameroon
- Central African Republic
- Chad
- Colombia
- Congo
- Democratic Republic of the Congo
- Ecuador
- Equatorial Guinea
- Ethiopia
- French Guiana (France)
- Gabon
- Gambia
- Ghana
- Guinea
- Guinea-Bissau
- Guyana
- Ivory Coast (Côte d'Ivoire)
- Kenya
- Liberia
- Mali
- Mauritania
- Niger
- Nigeria
- Panama
- Paraguay
- Peru
- Senegal
- Sierra Leone
- South Sudan
- Sudan
- Suriname
- Togo
- Trinidad and Tobago
- Uganda
- Venezuela

== Admission restrictions ==
- Citizens of Israel are required to obtain visa along with approval from the Malaysian Ministry of Home Affairs in order to enter Malaysia. In addition, they are banned from participating in Malaysia My Second Home programme.
- Citizens of North Korea are visa required since 6 March 2017 due to the diplomatic tensions caused by assassination of Kim Jong-nam.
- Citizens of Western Sahara are visa required and may enter by air only.

== Visitor statistics ==
Yearly tourist arrivals in millions

In 2016, Malaysia recorded 26,757,392 tourist arrivals, a growth of 4.0% compared to 25,721,251 in 2015. The table lists the top 15 arrivals to Malaysia by their origin countries.

—N/a	Denotes that the country was not within the top 15 arrivals for that year

Foreign tourist arrivals in Malaysia
Country	Visitors (6/2026)	Visitors (2025)	Visitors (2024)	Visitors (2023)	Visitors (2022)	Visitors (2021)	Visitors (2020)	Visitors (2019)	Visitors (2018)	Visitors (2017)	Visitors (2016)	Visitors (2015)
Singapore	4,390,687	9,344,513	9,099,727	8,308,230	5,222,991	16,308	1,545,255	10,163,882	10,615,986	12,441,713	13,272,961	12,930,754
China	2,191,132	3,965,140	3,287,362	1,474,114	211,363	7,701	405,149	3,114,257	2,944,133	2,281,666	2,124,942	1,677,163
Indonesia	1,792,196	3,755,129	3,651,668	3,108,165	1,481,739	11,025	711,723	3,623,277	3,277,689	2,796,570	3,049,964	2,788,033
Thailand	845,880	1,720,970	1,639,211	1,551,282	715,528	59,607	394,413	1,884,306	1,914,692	1,836,522	1,780,800	1,343,569
India	573,422	1,244,969	1,133,331	671,846	324,548	3,916	155,883	735,309	600,311	552,739	638,578	722,141
Brunei	433,896	1,029,048	1,142,134	811,833	301,757	773	136,020	1,216,123	1,382,031	1,660,506	1,391,016	1,133,555
South Korea	199,020	463,504	475,815	400,853	146,384	3,028	119,750	673,065	616,783	484,528	444,439	421,161
Australia	210,911	420,684	382,628	343,438	152,265	1,321	72,680	368,271	351,500	351,232	377,727	486,948
Philippines	200,634	416,595	400,912	339,282	159,442	2,317	66,051	421,908	396,062	370,559	417,446	554,917
Taiwan	192,916	400,067	385,415	283,380	48,132	563	60,090	382,916	383,922	332,927	300,861	283,224
United Kingdom	186,337	376,800	345,438	272,297	134,667	2,676	63,868	346,485	361,335	358,818	400,269	401,019
Japan	165,740	344,030	307,883	229,892	83,309	3,114	74,383	424,694	394,540	392,777	413,768	483,569
United States	151,322	291,765	271,809	229,476	108,141	2,030	48,810	269,928	253,384	198,203	217,075	237,768
Vietnam	132,390	285,865	330,189	344,361	173,763	583	64,184	400,346	375,578	248,927	216,877	229,926
Bangladesh	86,513	252,301	143,919	142,748	59,033	1,509	17,634	179,000	150,053	111,836	114,607	147,152
France	102,031	199,416	160,637	115,145	55,087	843	28,237	141,661	139,408	131,668	134,257	151,474
Germany	79,171	172,852	155,848	125,987	57,780	824	27,458	130,221	128,895	109,816	130,276	144,910
Myanmar	101,969	170,238	114,551	86,298	36,765	377	9,745	46,257	38,513	42,314	49,175	66,553
Pakistan	48,026	129,493	102,570	107,657	60,535	2,043	17,777	105,757	74,458	53,453	58,388	69,112
Russia	71,039	121,734	112,806	109,689	33,003	399	28,694	79,984	72,785	67,564	50,893	55,263
Canada	52,943	97,885	86,882	71,981	30,656	471	16,631	87,568	84,705	67,056	72,337	79,557
Netherlands	35,798	88,439	82,964	68,448	31,070	466	14,486	82,110	81,651	75,885	72,200	84,584
Spain	27,029	79,675	60,527	40,762	20,474	147	6,367	43,616	42,267	35,149	28,018	36,692
Italy	28,230	78,830	69,781	48,440	18,866	300	8,971	54,710	52,055	44,638	42,747	51,946
Sri Lanka	26,814	70,084	58,015	55,050	24,906	385	8,142	26,058	28,376	43,738	33,340	51,337
Cambodia	40,693	65,539	63,964	72,627	39,823	250	16,548	97,097	90,113	42,004	61,844	75,059
Saudi Arabia	15,977	55,176	62,764	51,375	35,980	687	23,390	121,444	112,263	100,549	123,878	99,754
New Zealand	24,545	51,828	47,961	42,955	18,238	196	8,794	50,140	50,698	55,923	53,352	60,846
Poland	27,578	48,186	36,821	21,472	8,472	161	7,539	27,033	24,364	20,067	19,768	19,920
Kazakhstan	21,154	33,895	30,730	8,298	2,836	141	6,065	18,138	13,861	12,577	10,717	15,410
Switzerland	14,954	32,499	28,035	23,312	10,486	197	5,263	25,659	25,680	20,775	26,628	28,141
Turkey	24,183	32,148	23,986	17,275	7,169	286	3,152	15,290	15,406	14,594	13,029	15,395
Belgium	10,991	27,124	25,234	17,726	7,543	122	3,734	22,082	20,624	17,327	14,283	18,789
Laos	15,292	24,967	18,886	16,781	7,010	425	5,424	26,955	23,782	39,460	31,061	24,448
Ireland	11,809	22,946	21,170	18,127	8,739	137	3,735	25,659	19,687	20,854	18,208	22,746
Egypt	8,947	22,843	22,859	20,783	11,117	652	6,204	29,831	27,909	23,760	30,231	25,637
Sweden	12,050	22,647	21,242	18,006	8,083	253	9,292	29,592	32,665	34,304	32,861	35,586
Nepal	6,977	21,472	20,091	18,488	11,379	198	5,067	20,437	19,914	20,553	60,476	93,159
Denmark	9,903	19,837	19,242	16,053	7,717	214	6,061	22,314	23,566	23,219	21,612	24,113
Iran	4,326	19,137	24,710	19,908	7,570	314	7,078	46,559	67,094	59,023	47,102	65,066
Iraq	5,373	18,954	18,884	12,562	6,008	452	3,628	21,421	22,291	18,555	22,533	20,098
South Africa	6,850	18,114	16,979	15,155	7,937	168	3,876	22,674	21,977	21,560	20,053	20,625
Ukraine	8,955	14,097	13,511	11,129	4,381	298	6,326	16,019	14,529	13,068	12,971	10,672
Norway	7,185	13,146	13,250	9,981	4,960	136	3,552	14,585	15,202	14,121	14,709	18,622
United Arab Emirates	1,543	7,457	6,836	7,877	3,230	86	679	11,174	9,386	8,555	14,150	15,769
Total	12,605,331	26,613,597	25,016,698	20,141,846	10,074,964	134,728	4,332,722	26,100,784	25,832,354	25,948,459	26,757,392	25,721,251

== See also ==
- Visa requirements for Malaysian citizens
- Malaysian passport
