= Malaysian Investment Development Authority =

Government agency

- Lembaga Pembangunan Pelaburan Malaysia (MIDA)
- Malaysia Investment Development Authority

Agency overview
- Formed: 1967; 59 years ago
- Preceding agencies: Federal Industrial Development Authority; Malaysian Industrial Development Authority
- Jurisdiction: Government of Malaysia
- Headquarters: MIDA Sentral, No.5, Jalan Stesen Sentral 5, Kuala Lumpur Sentral, 50470 Kuala Lumpur, Malaysia
- Motto: Invest In Malaysia > Your Profit Centre In Asia
- Minister responsible: Johari Abdul Ghani, Minister of Investment, Trade and Industry
- Deputy Minister responsible: Sim Tze Tzin, Deputy Minister of Investment, Trade and Industry
- Agency executives: Tengku Zafrul Aziz, Chairman; Datuk Sikh Shamsul Ibrahim Sikh Abdul Majid
- Parent department: Ministry of Investment, Trade and Industry
- Child agencies: InvestKL; Invest Selangor; Invest Perak; Invest Kedah; Invest Penang; Invest Melaka; Invest Johor; Invest NS; Invest Pahang
- Key document: Malaysian Industrial Development Authority (Incorporation) Act 1965
- Website: www.mida.gov.my/home/

The Malaysian Investment Development Authority (Malay: Lembaga Pembangunan Pelaburan Malaysia), abbreviated MIDA, previously known as Malaysian Industrial Development Authority is the government's principal agency to oversee and drive investment into the manufacturing and services sectors in Malaysia. Starting operations in 1967, MIDA was given the mandate to promote investments in the manufacturing and services sectors; and to advise the Ministry of Investment, Trade and Industry (MITI) on industry matters including the formulation of related policies.

MIDA assists companies which intend to invest in the manufacturing and services sectors, as well as facilitates the implementation of their projects. The wide range of services provided by MIDA include providing information on the opportunities for investments, as well as facilitating companies which are looking for joint venture partners.

== History ==
MIDA was established in and incorporated by the Malaysian Industrial Development Authority (Incorporation) Act 1965. The Act was first known as the Federal Industrial Development Authority (FIDA) Act 1965. It became fully operational in 1967, and began establishing overseas offices in 1972.

== Functions ==
Functions of MIDA:

- to promote foreign and domestic investments in the manufacturing and services sectors
- to undertake planning for industrial development in Malaysia
- to recommend policies and strategies on industrial promotion and development to the Minister of International Trade and Industry
- to evaluate applications for manufacturing licences and expatriate posts; tax incentives for manufacturing activities, tourism, R&D, training institutions and software development; and on raw materials, components and machinery
- to assist companies in the implementation and operation of their projects, and offer assistance through direct consultation and consultation and co-operation with the relevant authorities at both the federal and state levels
- to facilitate the exchange of information and co-ordination among institutions engaged in or connected with industrial development;
- to further enhance MIDA's role of assisting investors, senior representatives from key agencies are stationed at MIDA's headquarters in Kuala Lumpur to advise investors on government policies and procedures. These representatives include officials from the Ministry of Human Resources, Immigration Department, Royal Customs Malaysia, Department of Environment, Tenaga Nasional Berhad and Telekom Malaysia Berhad.

In addition to its Headquarters, MIDA provides the following contact points for investors not based in Kuala Lumpur, and overseas:

MIDA State Offices:

- Selangor
- Perak
- Pulau Pinang
- Kedah
- Terengganu
- Kelantan
- Pahang
- Johor
- Melaka
- Negeri Sembilan
- Sabah
- Sarawak

MIDA Overseas Offices:

Asia and Asia Pacific

- Sydney, Australia
- Guangzhou, China
- Shanghai, China
- Mumbai, India
- Osaka, Japan
- Tokyo, Japan
- Seoul, South Korea
- Taipei, Taiwan
- Singapore

America

- Chicago
- Houston
- Los Angeles
- New York
- San Jose

Europe

- Paris, France
- Frankfurt, Germany
- Munich, Germany
- Milan, Italy
- Stockholm, Sweden
- London, UK

Middle East

- Dubai, UAE

=== Incentives ===
MIDA is able to offer various incentives to attract foreign investment, including incentives for specific companies. Regionally, there are two levels of incentives: one for Kuala Lumpur, Johor Bahru, and Penang, and another for the rest of the country. MIDA meets weekly on Thursdays to approve new investment applications, and proposed incentives; an official from the Finance Ministry sits in on the meetings to approve the proposed incentives on the spot. If the incentive cannot be approved immediately, it is passed to a higher official at the Ministry, who typically approves or rejects it within a week.

== Criticism ==
MIDA has been criticised by one business periodical as being "preoccupied with internal bureaucratic concerns rather than the entrepreneur's needs" emphasising "rules and regulations, with less actual assistance to the entrepreneur." The same periodical claimed "the entrepreneur appears to have less of a role in the economy" in Malaysia. However, the Foreign Investment Advisory Service of the World Bank has praised MIDA, saying it could be relied on "to provide practically all the approvals and clearances needed" and that "the involvement of MIDA on behalf of an investor effectively guaranteed approvals and permits to be forthcoming without difficulties".

== See also ==
- Asset management in Malaysia
- Neurogine Sdn Bhd
