= Visa requirements for Malaysian citizens =

Travel regulations abroad

A Malaysian passport

Visa requirements for Malaysian citizens are administrative entry restrictions by the authorities of other states placed on citizens of Malaysia.

As of 2026, Malaysian citizens have visa-free or visa on arrival access to 183 countries and territories, ranking the Malaysian passport 6th in the world according to the Henley Passport Index, and 3rd in the world according to the Global Passport Power Rank, making it the 2nd highest-ranked passport in Southeast Asia after Singapore, the 5th highest-ranked in Asia and the 2nd highest-ranked passport in the developing world and among Muslim-majority countries behind the United Arab Emirates (UAE).

In September 2017, Malaysia announced a ban on all Malaysian citizens from travelling to North Korea, in the wake of strained Malaysia–North Korea relations following the assassination of Kim Jong-nam at Kuala Lumpur International Airport.

Although Malaysian passports bear the inscription "This passport is valid for all countries except Israel" and the Malaysian government officially allows travel to Israel for Christian and Muslim pilgrims only, Israel still issues visas to Malaysian citizens according to its rules.

== Visa requirements map ==
Visa requirements for Malaysian citizens holding ordinary passports Malaysia Visa not required / ETA (Note: ETA required for Australia, Kenya, New Zealand, Saint Kitts and Nevis, Seychelles, South Korea and the United Kingdom) Visa on arrival eVisa Visa available both on arrival or online Visa required prior to arrival Travel banned by the Malaysian government due to safety concerns or admission refused

== Visa requirements ==
Country / Region	Visa requirement	Allowed stay	Notes
Afghanistan	eVisa	30 days	e-Visa : Visitors must arrive at Kabul International Airport (KBL).; Visitors may apply for an e-Visa in other countries, excluding some countries of residence (include Malaysia).; Due to Taliban recaptured Kabul, the Malaysian government has advised its citizens not to travel to Afghanistan for any reason.
Albania	Visa not required	90 days	
Algeria	Visa not required	90 days	
Andorra	Visa not required	90 days	
Angola	eVisa	30 days	
Antigua and Barbuda	Visa not required	180 days	
Argentina	Visa not required	30 days	
Armenia	eVisa	120 days	e-Visa may be obtained online prior to departure.; Visa on arrival for Malaysian citizens if they provide a valid residence permit or valid visa issued by the EU and Schengen member states, US, Australia, New Zealand, South Korea, UK, Canada, Russia, or Japan or a valid residence permit (physical card or sticker) issued by one of the GCC member states.
Australia	Electronic Travel Authority	3 months	3 months on each visit in 12-month period if granted.; Travelers may be required to submit additional documents, and the ETA may not be granted within 72 hours.
Austria	Visa not required	90 days	90 days within any 180-day period in the Schengen Area.
Azerbaijan	eVisa / Visa on arrival	30 days	
Bahamas	Visa not required	3 months	
Bahrain	eVisa / Visa on arrival	14 days	e-Visa may be obtained online prior to departure.
Bangladesh	Visa on arrival	30 days	Visa fee is US$51.
Barbados	Visa not required	6 months	
Belarus	Visa not required	30 days	Must arrive and depart via Minsk International Airport.
Belgium	Visa not required	90 days	90 days within any 180-day period in the Schengen Area.
Belize	Visa not required	180 days	All travellers must complete an arrival form and customs declaration.
Benin	Visa not required	30 days	Must have an international vaccination certificate.
Bhutan	eVisa	90 days	The Sustainable Development Fee (SDF) of 200 USD per person, per night for almost all visitors to Bhutan. Additionally, if payment is made in US dollars from September 1, 2023 to August 31, 2027, the SDF is 100 USD.
Bolivia	Online Visa application		Visitors must complete an online application form, but still need to visit the embassy to receive the visa.
Bosnia and Herzegovina	Visa not required	90 days	
Botswana	Visa not required	90 days	
Brazil	Visa not required	90 days	
Brunei	Visa not required	30 days	
Bulgaria	Visa not required	90 days	90 days within any 180-day period in the Schengen Area.
Burkina Faso	eVisa		
Burundi	Online Visa / Visa on arrival	1 month	
Cambodia	Visa not required	30 days	
Cameroon	eVisa		
Canada	Visa required		Malaysian citizens who have held a Canadian visa in the last 10 years or who hold a valid United States non-immigrant visa can enter Canada solely with an eTA when arriving by air.; Malaysia citizens who do receive a visa are normally issued with multiple-entry combination visitor visas (Generally, the validity period is until the passport expiration date, and the maximum period is 10 years), and each entry can stay for a maximum of 6 months (the period of stay is subject to the border immigration officer).
Cape Verde	Visa on arrival (EASE)	30 days	Visa on arrival may applied for via the online platform (EASE) and issued at international airports in Sal, Boa Vista, São Vicente or Santiago. Visa fee is approximately 25–30 EUR.; Visitors must pay the Airport Security Fee (TSA) before visiting. The cost is 3,400 CVE (approx. 31 EUR) and can be paid via the online platform (EASE).
Central African Republic	Visa required		
Chad	eVisa	90 days	
Chile	Visa not required	30 days	
China	Visa not required	30 days	
Colombia	Online Visa		
Comoros	Visa on arrival	45 days	
Republic of the Congo	Visa required		
Democratic Republic of the Congo	eVisa	7 days	
Costa Rica	Visa not required	90 days	
Côte d'Ivoire	eVisa	3 months	Must be arriving at Port Bouet Airport and hold an International Certificate of Vaccination.; Visa fee is 73 EUR.
Croatia	Visa not required	90 days	90 days within any 180-day period in the Schengen Area.
Cuba	Visa not required	90 days	
Cyprus	Visa not required	90 days	90 days within any 180-day period.
Czech Republic	Visa not required	3 months	3 months, regardless of previous time spent in other Schengen countries (pursuant to the Czech Republic-Malaysia bilateral visa exemption agreement that was concluded before the Czech Republic joined the European Union and the Schengen Area).
Denmark	Visa not required	3 months	3 months within the past 6 months, regardless of previous time spent in other Schengen countries, but including time spent in other Nordic countries (except Iceland).
Djibouti	eVisa / Visa on arrival	90 days	
Dominica	Visa not required	6 months	
Dominican Republic	Visa not required	30 days	
Ecuador	Visa not required	90 days	
Egypt	eVisa / Visa not required	30 days / 14 days	An e-Visa may also be obtained online prior to departure.; Visa on arrival also available for stays longer than 14 days.
El Salvador	Visa not required	180 days	
Equatorial Guinea	eVisa		
Eritrea	Visa required		
Estonia	Visa not required	90 days	90 days within any 180-day period in the Schengen Area.
Eswatini	Visa not required	30 days	
Ethiopia	eVisa / Visa on arrival	90 days	e-Visa holders must arrive via Addis Ababa Bole International Airport
Fiji	Visa not required	4 months	
Finland	Visa not required	90 days	90 days within any 180-day period in the Schengen Area.
France	Visa not required	90 days	90 days within any 180-day period in the Schengen Area.
Gabon	eVisa	90 days	
Gambia	Visa not required	90 days	
Georgia	Visa not required	1 year	
Germany	Visa not required	90 days	90 days within any 180-day period in the Schengen Area.
Ghana	eVisa	90 days	
Greece	Visa not required	90 days	90 days within any 180-day period in the Schengen Area.
Grenada	Visa not required	3 months	
Guatemala	Visa not required	90 days	
Guinea	eVisa	90 days	
Guinea-Bissau	Visa on arrival	90 days	
Guyana	Visa not required	60 days	
Haiti	Visa not required	3 months	
Honduras	Visa not required	3 months	
Hungary	Visa not required	90 days	90 days within any 180-day period in the Schengen Area.
Iceland	Visa not required	90 days	90 days within any 180-day period in the Schengen Area.
India	eVisa	30 days	e-Visa holders must arrive via 32 designated airports (Note: Ahmedabad; Amritsar; Bagdogra; Bengaluru; Bhubaneswar; Chandigarh; Chennai; Coimbatore; Delhi; Gaya; Goa-Dabolim; Goa-Manohar; Guwahati; Hyderabad; Indore; Jaipur; Kannur; Kochi; Kolkata; Kozhikode; Lucknow; Madurai; Mangaluru; Mumbai; Nagpur; Port Blair; Pune; Surat; Thiruvananthapuram; Tiruchirappalli; Varanasi; Visakhapatnam) or 5 designated seaports. (Note: Chennai; Cochin; Mormugao (Goa); Mumbai; Mangalore); An Indian e-Tourist Visa may only be obtained twice within 1 calendar year.; Foreigners of Pakistani origin or who hold a Pakistani Passport are not eligible for an e-Visa. Foreigners who are not Pakistani nationals, but whose parents or grandparents (either paternal or maternal) were born in, or were permanent residents in Pakistan, are also not eligible for an e-Visa.; Malaysians are exempt from paying the e-Tourist visa fee with double entry from 1 July 2024 to 31 December 2026.
Indonesia	Visa not required	30 days	
Iran	Visa not required	14 days	Due to safety concerns, the Malaysian government has advised its citizens not to travel to Iran for any reason.
Iraq	Visa not required	30 days	Due to safety concerns, the Malaysian government has advised its citizens not to travel to Iraq for any reason.
Ireland	Visa not required	3 months	
Israel	Travel prohibited		The Malaysian government only allows travel to Israel for pilgrimage purposes.; Confirmation from Israeli Foreign Ministry is required before a visa is issued.
Italy	Visa not required	90 days	90 days within any 180-day period in the Schengen Area.
Jamaica	Visa not required	180 days	
Japan	Visa not required	90 days	Visa not required for visits up to 90 days using the Malaysian biometric passports according of Here.
Jordan	eVisa / Free visa on arrival	1 month	Malaysians can obtain a visa for free upon arrival.
Kazakhstan	Visa not required	30 days	
Kenya	Visa not required	90 days	
Kiribati	Visa not required	90 days	
North Korea	Travel prohibited		Due to safety concerns and in the wake of strained Malaysia–North Korea relations following the assassination of Kim Jong-nam at Kuala Lumpur International Airport, the Malaysian government has prohibited all citizens from travelling to North Korea.
South Korea	Electronic Travel Authorization	90 days	Malaysian citizens can enter South Korea as a short term visit (e.g., tours, visiting relatives or friends, attending simple meetings) up to 90 days without a visa, though you should remain aware of the quarantine requirements. You must also have an onward or return ticket. It is illegal to work on a tourist visa, whether as a teacher or in any other capacity.; You must be in possession of a Korea Electronic Travel Authorization (K-ETA) to enter Korea visa-free. You can complete your K-ETA application up to 24 hours before boarding your flight and it will be valid for 3 years from the date of approval. There is a small, non-refundable charge.
Kuwait	eVisa / Visa on arrival	3 months	Fee 3 KWD.; e-Visa may be obtained online prior to departure.
Kyrgyzstan	Visa not required	30 days	30 days within any 60-day period.
Laos	Visa not required	30 days	
Latvia	Visa not required	90 days	90 days within any 180-day period in the Schengen Area.
Lebanon	Free visa on arrival	1 month	Granted free of charge at Beirut International Airport.; Must not have Israeli visa or stamp in the passport. Must be in possession of phone number & address to be visited in Lebanon, and a non-refundable onward ticket.
Lesotho	Visa not required	90 days	
Liberia	e-VOA	3 months	Travelers must pre-apply for the visa online through a dedicated portal allows them to obtain a Visa upon arrival in Liberia.; Currently available only upon arrival at Roberts International Airport (ROB) in Monrovia.
Libya	Visa not required	30 days	According to the e-Visa site, citizens of Malaysia are exempt from visa requirements.; According to IATA Timatic a security letter issued by the Libyan Immigration Authorities may also be required. IATA also treats the visa exemption as a visa on arrival.; Due to safety concerns, the Malaysian government has advised its citizens not to travel to Libya for any reason.
Liechtenstein	Visa not required	90 days	90 days within any 180-day period in the Schengen Area.
Lithuania	Visa not required	90 days	90 days within any 180-day period in the Schengen Area.
Luxembourg	Visa not required	90 days	90 days within any 180-day period in the Schengen Area.
Madagascar	eVisa / Visa on arrival	90 days	For stays of 61 to 90 days, the visa fee is 59 USD.
Malawi	Visa not required	90 days	
Maldives	Visa not required	90 days	Must have hotel reservation.
Mali	Visa required		
Malta	Visa not required	90 days	90 days within any 180-day period in the Schengen Area.
Marshall Islands	Visa on arrival	90 days	
Mauritania	eVisa	30 days	
Mauritius	Visa not required	90 days	
Mexico	Visa not required	180 days	
Micronesia	Visa not required	30 days	
Moldova	Visa not required	90 days	90 days within any 180-day period.
Monaco	Visa not required	90 days	
Mongolia	Visa not required	30 days	
Montenegro	Visa not required	90 days	
Morocco	Visa not required	90 days	
Mozambique	eVisa / Visa on arrival	30 days	At Beira (BEW), Nampula (APL), Maputo (MPM), Pemba (POL), Tete (TET) and Vilankulo (VNX). Must have onward ticket.
Myanmar	Visa not required	14 days	Must arrive at and depart from Yangon (RGN), Mandalay (MDL) or Nay Pyi Taw (NYT) International Airports.
Namibia	Visa not required	3 months	
Nauru	Visa required		Application via email to director of immigration office.
Nepal	Online Visa / Visa on arrival	90 days	
Netherlands	Visa not required	90 days	90 days within any 180-day period in the Schengen Area.
New Zealand	Electronic Travel Authority	3 months	International Visitor Conservation and Tourism Levy must be paid upon requesting an Electronic Travel Authority.; Holders of an Australian Permanent Resident Visa or Resident Return Visa may be granted a New Zealand Resident Visa on arrival permitting indefinite stay (pursuant to the Trans-Tasman Travel Arrangement), subject to meeting character requirements and obtaining an Electronic Travel Authority prior to departure. Such travellers are not required to pay the International Visitor Conservation and Tourism Levy.
Nicaragua	Visa not required	90 days	
Niger	Visa required		
Nigeria	eVisa	30 days	
North Macedonia	Visa not required	30 days	
Norway	Visa not required	3 months	3 months within the past 6 months, regardless of previous time spent in other Schengen countries, but including time spent in other Nordic countries.
Oman	Visa not required / eVisa	14 days / 30 days	
Pakistan	eVisa	3 months	
Palau	Free visa on arrival	30 days	
Panama	Visa not required	90 days	
Papua New Guinea	eVisa	60 days	Must arrive through Port Moresby (POM) or Rabaul (RAB) airports.
Paraguay	Visa not required	30 days	
Peru	Visa not required	90 days	
Philippines	Visa not required	30 days	
Poland	Visa not required	90 days	90 days within a 180-day period, regardless of previous time spent in other Schengen countries (pursuant to the Poland-Malaysia bilateral agreement regulating visa-free traffic that was concluded before Poland joined the European Union and the Schengen Area).
Portugal	Visa not required	90 days	90 days within any 180-day period in the Schengen Area.
Qatar	Visa not required	90 days	
Romania	Visa not required	90 days	90 days within any 180-day period in the Schengen Area.
Russia	eVisa	16 days	
Rwanda	Visa not required	30 days	
Saint Kitts and Nevis	Electronic Travel Authorisation	3 months	
Saint Lucia	Visa on arrival	6 weeks	
Saint Vincent and the Grenadines	Visa not required	3 months	
Samoa	Entry permit on arrival	90 days	
San Marino	Visa not required	90 days	Open borders but de facto follows Italian visa policy.
São Tomé and Príncipe	eVisa		Visa holders issued by USA or a Schengen Member State may enter São Tomé and Príncipe for stay up to a maximum stay of 15 days.
Saudi Arabia	eVisa / Visa on arrival	90 days	
Senegal	Visa not required	90 days	
Serbia	eVisa	90 days	90 days within any 180-day period. Transfers allowed.; Valid Schengen, UK, USA, Switzerland or EEA Member State Visa holder may enter Serbia without Serbian tourist visa for a maximum stay of 90 days within any 180-day period, provided visa remains valid for the entire length of stay.
Seychelles	Electronic Border System	3 months	Application can be submitted up to 30 days before travel.; Visitors must upload a reservation confirmation(s) for each visitor's location of stay in Seychelles.; Yellow fever vaccination certificate is required if coming from endemic countries.; Payment of the fee (EUR 10) by credit or debit card.; Valid for one journey only and it expires once exit the country.
Sierra Leone	Free visa on arrival	30 days	
Singapore	Visa not required	30 days	
Slovakia	Visa not required	90 days	90 days within any 180-day period in the Schengen Area.
Slovenia	Visa not required	90 days	90 days within any 180-day period in the Schengen Area.
Solomon Islands	Free Visitor's Permit on arrival	3 months	Visitors may obtain a free permit valid for 3 months within any 1-year period on arrival.
Somalia	Visa not required	30 days	Due to safety concerns, the Malaysian government has advised its citizens not to travel to Somalia for any reason.
South Africa	Visa not required	90 days	
South Sudan	eVisa		Obtainable online 30 days single entry for 100 USD, 90 days multiple entry for 200 USD and 180 days multiple entry for 350 USD.; Printed visa authorization must be presented at the time of travel.; Due to safety concerns, the Malaysian government has advised its citizens not to travel to South Sudan for any reason.
Spain	Visa not required	90 days	90 days within any 180-day period in the Schengen Area.
Sri Lanka	Free ETA / Visa on arrival	30 days	Sri Lanka introduced an ETA valid for 30 days.
Sudan	Visa on arrival	3 months	Due to safety concerns, the Malaysian government has advised its citizens not to travel to Sudan for any reason.
Suriname	Visa not required	30 days	An entrance fee of USD 50 or EUR 50 must be paid online prior to arrival.; Multiple entry e-Visa is also available.
Sweden	Visa not required	90 days	90 days within any 180-day period in the Schengen Area.
Switzerland	Visa not required	90 days	90 days within any 180-day period in the Schengen Area.
Syria	eVisa / Free visa on arrival	3 months	Due to safety concerns, the Malaysian government has advised its citizens not to travel to Syria for any reason.
Tajikistan	Visa not required	30 days	
Tanzania	Visa not required	3 months	
Thailand	Visa not required	30 days	All passengers must complete the Thai Digital Arrival Card (TDAC) at least 3 days before arrival.
Timor-Leste	Visa not required	30 days	Must hold return / onward ticket.
Togo	eVisa	15 days	Must have return / onward ticket and 3 passport photos.
Tonga	Free visa on arrival	31 days	Must have return / onward ticket.
Trinidad and Tobago	Visa not required		
Tunisia	Visa not required	3 months	
Turkey	Visa not required	90 days	90 days within any 180-day period in Turkiye.
Turkmenistan	Visa required		10-day visa on arrival if holding a letter of invitation provided by a company registered in Turkmenistan with a prior approval from the Foreign Ministry. Visitors can apply to extend their stay for an additional 10 days.; When transiting between two non-bordering countries, visitors can obtain a Turkmenistan transit visa for a five-day stay. This must be applied for in advance at the Turkmenistan Embassy. Visitors must also submit copies of the visas for the country of entry into Turkmenistan and the country of departure from Turkmenistan. Visa fee is 20 USD.
Tuvalu	Free Visa on arrival	1 month	
Uganda	Visa not required	3 months	
Ukraine	eVisa	30 days	
United Arab Emirates	Visa not required	30 days	
United Kingdom	Electronic Travel Authorisation	6 months	ETA UK is valid for 2 years.
United States	Visa required		Malaysian citizens who do receive a visa are normally issued with 10-years multiple-entry combination B1 / B2 visas, and each entry can stay for a maximum of 6 months (the period of stay is subject to the border immigration officer).
Uruguay	Visa not required	30 days	
Uzbekistan	Visa not required	30 days	
Vanuatu	Visa not required	120 days	
Vatican City	Visa not required	90 days	Open borders but de facto follows Italian visa policy.
Venezuela	Visa not required	90 days	Due to safety concerns, the Malaysian government has advised its citizens not to travel to Venezuela for any reason.
Vietnam	Visa not required	30 days	90 days multiple entries e-Visa is also available.
Yemen	Visa on arrival	3 months	Due to safety concerns, the Malaysian government has advised its citizens not travel to Yemen for any reason.; Separately, Yemen introduced an e-Visa system for visitors who meet certain eligibility requirements (group travel of 10 or more people, business trips, and transit etc.).
Zambia	Visa not required	90 days	
Zimbabwe	Visa not required	3 months	

Date of visa changes
Malaysians have never required visas to the following countries:
- Barbados
- Brunei
- Fiji
- Indonesia
- Ireland
- Schengen Area
- Singapore
- Thailand
- United Kingdom
30 August 1962: Philippines (as Federation of Malaya)
18 December 1980: Micronesia
9 September 1983: South Korea
1 November 1987: New Zealand
11 March 1993: Dominica
6 June 1994: Mongolia
7 September 1994: Argentina
20 June 1995: Kyrgyzstan
26 May 1997: Cambodia
26 September 1997: Cuba
22 July 1999: Brazil
25 November 2001: Vietnam
1 November 2002: Taiwan
1 July 2004: Laos
20 September 2007: Kiribati
18 December 2007: Dominican Republic
28 November 2009: Guam & Northern Mariana Islands
8 May 2012: Panama
1 July 2013: Japan
11 January 2014: Moldova
19 August 2016: Tanzania
14 December 2016: Costa Rica
1 January 2017: Kazakhstan
12 February 2017: Belarus
9 August 2017: Qatar
27 December 2017: Morocco
1 January 2018: Rwanda
10 February 2018: Uzbekistan
10 December 2020: Oman
1 January 2022: Tajikistan
1 July 2022: Suriname
1 December 2023: China
11 September 2024: Iraq
16 August 2025: Timor-Leste
1 October 2025: Myanmar
31 December 2025: Paraguay

== Territories and disputed areas ==
Visa requirements for Malaysia citizens for visits to various territories, disputed areas, partially recognized countries and restricted zones:

Visitor to	Visa requirement	Notes (excluding departure fees)
Europe
Abkhazia	Visa required	Tourists from all countries (except Georgia) can visit Abkhazia for a period not exceeding 24 hours as part of an organized tourist group.
Mount Athos	Special permit required	Special permit required (4 days: 25 EUR for Orthodox visitors, 35 EUR for non-Orthodox visitors, 18 EUR for students). There is a visitors' quota: maximum 100 Orthodox and 10 non-Orthodox per day and women are not allowed.
Brest and Grodno, Belarus	Visa not required	Visa-free for 10 days Entry to / exit from Brest, Zhabinsky, Kamenets, Pruzhansky districts of Brest region, as well as Svisloch district of the Grodno region must be through road checkpoints Brest (Terespol), Domachevo (Slovatici), Peschatka (Polovtsi), the point of a simplified pass Pererov (Bialowieza), railway crossing point Brest-Vostochny (Terespol) & checkpoint Brest airport. Entry to / exit from territory of special tourist and recreational park Augustow Canal must be through road checkpoints Bruzgi (Forge Belostotskaya) Privalka (Raigardas), point of a simplified check Forestry (Rudavka), Privalka (Svindubre), railway checkpoint Grodno (Kuznica Belostotskaya) & checkpoint Airport Grodno.
(Autonomous Republic of Crimea) Crimea	Visa required	Visa issued by Russia is required.
Northern Cyprus	Visa not required	3 months
(United Nations) UN Buffer Zone in Cyprus	Access Permit required	Access Permit is required for travelling inside the zone, except Civil Use Areas.
Faroe Islands	Visa not required	90 days
Gibraltar	Visa not required	90 days
Guernsey	Visa not required	90 days
Isle of Man	Visa not required	90 days
(Norway) Jan Mayen	Permit required	Permit issued by the local police required for staying for less than 24 hours and permit issued by the Norwegian police for staying for more than 24 hours.
Jersey	Visa not required	90 days
Kosovo	Visa not required	90 days
Russia	Special authorization required	Several closed cities and regions in Russia require special authorization.
South Ossetia	Visa required	To enter South Ossetia, visitors must have a multiple-entry visa for Russia and register their stay with the Migration Service of the Ministry of Internal Affairs within 3 days.
Transnistria	Visa not required	Visitors must complete and obtain a temporary migration card at the border checkpoint. The maximum period of stay is 45 days, and it can be extended multiple times through this card.
Africa
British Indian Ocean Territory	Special permit required	Special permit required.
Eritrea outside Asmara	Travel permit required	To travel in the rest of the country, a Travel Permit for Foreigners is required (20 Eritrean nakfa).
Mayotte	Visa not required	90 days
Réunion	Visa not required	90 days
Ascension Island	eVisa	3 months within any 1-year period.
Saint Helena	Visa not required	183 days
Tristan da Cunha	Permission required	Permission to land required for 15/30 GBP (yacht/ship passenger) for Tristan da Cunha Island or 20 GBP for Gough Island, Inaccessible Island or Nightingale Islands.
Sahrawi Arab Democratic Republic	Undefined visa regime	Undefined visa regime in the Western Sahara controlled territory.
Somaliland	Visa required	
Sudan	Travel permit required	All foreigners traveling more than 25 kilometers outside of Khartoum must obtain a travel permit.; Due to safety concerns, the Malaysian government has advised its citizens not to travel to Sudan for any reason.
(Sudan) Darfur	Travel permit required	Separate travel permit is required.; Due to safety concerns, the Malaysian government has advised its citizens not to travel to Sudan for any reason.
Asia
(China) Hainan	Visa not required	30 days; Available at Haikou Meilan International Airport and Sanya Phoenix International Airport.
Hong Kong	Visa not required	90 days
India PAP/RAP	PAP/RAP required	Protected Area Permit (PAP) required for whole states of Nagaland and Sikkim and parts of states Manipur, Arunachal Pradesh, Uttaranchal, Jammu and Kashmir, Rajasthan, Himachal Pradesh. Restricted Area Permit (RAP) required for all of Andaman and Nicobar Islands and parts of Sikkim. Some of these requirements are occasionally lifted for a year.
Kazakhstan	Special permission required	Special permission required for the town of Baikonur and surrounding areas in Kyzylorda Oblast, and the town of Gvardeyskiy near Almaty.
(Iran) Kish Island	Visa not required	Visitors to Kish Island do not require a visa.
Macao	Visa not required	30 days
Maldives	Permission required	With the exception of the capital Malé, tourists are generally prohibited from visiting non-resort islands without the express permission of the Government of Maldives.
North Korea outside Pyongyang	Travel prohibited	People are not allowed to leave the capital city, tourists can only leave the capital with a governmental tourist guide (no independent moving); Due to safety concerns and in the wake of strained Malaysia–North Korea relations following the assassination of Kim Jong-nam at Kuala Lumpur International Airport, the Malaysian government has prohibited all citizens from travelling to North Korea.
Palestine	Visa not required	Arrival by sea to Gaza Strip not allowed.
Taiwan	Visa not required	30 days
(Tajikistan) Gorno-Badakhshan Autonomous Province	OIVR permit required	OIVR permit required (15+5 Tajikistani Somoni) and another special permit (free of charge) is required for Lake Sarez.
(China) Tibet Autonomous Region	TTP required	Tibet Travel Permit required (10 US Dollars).
Turkmenistan	Special permit required	A special permit, issued prior to arrival by Ministry of Foreign Affairs, is required if visiting the following places: Atamurat, Cheleken, Dashoguz, Serakhs and Serhetabat.
(United Nations) Korean Demilitarized Zone	Access Restricted	Restricted zone.
(United Nations) UNDOF Zone and Ghajar	Access Restricted	Restricted zone.
Yemen	Special permission required	Special permission needed for travel outside Sanaa or Aden.; Due to safety concerns, the Malaysian government has advised its citizens not travel to Yemen for any reason.
Caribbean and North Atlantic
Anguilla	Visa not required	3 months
Aruba	Visa not required	90 days
Bermuda	Visa not required	6 months.
(Netherlands) Bonaire, St. Eustatius and Saba	Visa not required	90 days
British Virgin Islands	Visa not required	6 months; Extensions possible.
(Colombia) San Andrés and Leticia	Tourist Card on arrival	must hold return/onward ticket. Visitors arriving at Gustavo Rojas Pinilla International Airport and Alfredo Vásquez Cobo International Airport must buy tourist cards on arrival.
Cayman Islands	Visa not required	6 months
Curacao	Visa not required	3 months
(France) French West Indies	Visa not required	90 days. French West Indies refers to Martinique, Guadeloupe, Saint Martin and Saint Barthélemy.
Greenland	Visa not required	90 days
(Venezuela) Margarita Island	Visa not required	All visitors are fingerprinted.; Due to safety concerns, the Malaysian government has advised its citizens not to travel to Venezuela for any reason.
Montserrat	Visa not required	6 months
Puerto Rico	Visa required	Visa Issued by the United States is required.
Saint Pierre and Miquelon	Visa not required	90 days
Sint Maarten	Visa not required	90 days
Turks and Caicos Islands	Visa required	Holders of valid visa issued by Canada, United Kingdom or the USA may enter Turks and Caicos Islands for stay up to a maximum of 90 days.
U.S. Virgin Islands	Visa required	Visa issued by the United States is required.
South America
(France) French Guiana	Visa not required	90 days
Galápagos	Pre-registration required	60 days; Visitors must pre-register to receive a 20 USD Transit Control Card (TCT).
Oceania
American Samoa	Entry permit required	Entry Permit may be obtained from Office of Attorney General of American Samoa.
(Australia) Ashmore and Cartier Islands	Special authorisation required	Special authorisation required.
(France) Clipperton Island	Special permit required	Special permit required.
Cook Islands	Visa not required	31 days
French Polynesia	Visa not required	90 days
Guam	Visa not required	45 days
(Fiji) Lau Province	Special permission required	Special permission required.
New Caledonia	Visa not required	90 days
Niue	Visa not required	30 days
Northern Mariana Islands	Visa not required	45 days
Pitcairn Islands	Visa not required	14 days visa free and landing fee 35 USD or tax of 5 USD if not going ashore.
United States Minor Outlying Islands	Special permits required	Special permits required for Baker Island, Howland Island, Jarvis Island, Johnston Atoll, Kingman Reef, Midway Atoll, Palmyra Atoll and Wake Island.
Wallis and Futuna	Visa not required	90 days
South Atlantic and Antarctica
Falkland Islands	Visa not required	A visitor permit is normally issued as a stamp in the passport on arrival, The maximum validity period is 1 month.
South Georgia and the South Sandwich Islands	Permit required	Pre-arrival permit from the Commissioner required 60 days before arrival
Antarctica	Special permits required	Special permits required for British Antarctic Territory, French Southern and Antarctic Lands, Argentine Antarctica, (Australia) Australian Antarctic Territory, (Antártica Chilena Province) Chilean Antarctic Territory, (Australia) Heard Island and McDonald Islands, (Norway) Peter I Island, (Norway) Queen Maud Land, (New Zealand) Ross Dependency.

== APEC Business Travel Card ==
Full members of the scheme Transitional members (United States, Canada)

Holders of an APEC Business Travel Card (ABTC) travelling on business do not require a visa to the following countries:

- Australia^{2}
- Brunei^{2}
- Chile^{2}
- China^{4}
- Hong Kong^{4}
- Indonesia^{4}
- Japan^{2}
- Mexico^{1}
- New Zealand^{2}
- Papua New Guinea^{4}
- Peru^{2}
- Philippines^{4}
- Russia^{3}
- Singapore^{4}
- South Korea^{2}
- Taiwan^{2}
- Thailand^{2}
- Vietnam^{4}

_{1 - Up to 180 days}
_{2 - Up to 90 days}
_{3 - Up to 90 days in a period of 180 days}
_{4 - Up to 60 days}

The card must be used in conjunction with a passport and has the following advantages:

- No need to apply for a visa or entry permit to APEC countries, as the card is treated as such (except by Canada and United States)
- Undertake legitimate business in participating economies
- Expedited border crossing in all member economies, including transitional members

== Non-visa restrictions ==
=== Blank passport pages ===
Many countries require a minimum number of blank pages to be available in the passport being presented, typically one or two pages. Endorsement pages, which often appear after the visa pages, are not counted as being valid or available.

=== Vaccination ===
Cover of the new International Certificate of Vaccination issued by the Bureau of Quarantine in the Philippines since 2021

The African countries of Angola, Benin, Burkina Faso, Burundi, Cameroon, Central African Republic, Democratic Republic of the Congo, Republic of the Congo, Côte d'Ivoire, Gabon, Ghana, Guinea-Bissau, Mali, Niger, Sierra Leone and Togo, South Sudan and Uganda, along with French Guiana in South America, require all incoming passengers older than nine months to one year, to have a current International Certificate of Vaccination or Prophylaxis.

Some other countries require vaccination only if the passenger is coming from an infected area or has visited one recently or has transited for 12 hours in those countries: Algeria, Botswana, Cabo Verde, Chad, Djibouti, Egypt, Eswatini, Ethiopia, Gambia, Ghana, Guinea, Lesotho, Libya, Equatorial Guinea, Eritrea, Madagascar, Malawi, Mauritania, Mauritius, Mozambique, Namibia, Nigeria, Papua New Guinea, Seychelles, Somalia, South Africa, Sudan, Tunisia, Uganda, Tanzania, Zambia and Zimbabwe.

=== Passport validity length ===
Very few countries, such as Paraguay, just require a valid passport on arrival.

However many countries and groupings now require only an identity card – especially from their neighbours. Other countries may have special bilateral arrangements that depart from the generality of their passport validity length policies to shorten the period of passport validity required for each other's citizens or even accept passports that have already expired (but not been cancelled).

Some countries, such as Japan, Ireland and the United Kingdom, require a passport valid throughout the period of the intended stay.

In the absence of specific bilateral agreements, countries requiring passports to be valid for at least 6 more months on arrival include Afghanistan, Algeria, Anguilla, Bahrain, Bhutan, Botswana, British Virgin Islands, Brunei, Cambodia, Cameroon, Cape Verde, Cayman Islands, Central African Republic, Chad, Comoros, Costa Rica, Côte d'Ivoire, Curaçao, Ecuador, Egypt, El Salvador, Equatorial Guinea, Fiji, Gabon, Guinea Bissau, Guyana, Haiti, India, Indonesia, Iran, Iraq, Israel, Jordan, Kenya, Kiribati, Kuwait, Laos, Madagascar, Malaysia, Marshall Islands, Mongolia, Myanmar, Namibia, Nepal, Nicaragua, Nigeria, Oman, Palau, Papua New Guinea, Peru, Philippines, Qatar, Rwanda, Samoa, Saudi Arabia, Singapore, Solomon Islands, Somalia, Sri Lanka, Sudan, Suriname, Tanzania, Thailand, Timor-Leste, Tokelau, Tonga, Turkey, Tuvalu, Uganda, United Arab Emirates, Vanuatu, Venezuela, and Vietnam.

Countries requiring passports valid for at least 4 months on arrival include Micronesia and Zambia.

Countries requiring passports with a validity of at least 3 months beyond the date of intended departure include Azerbaijan, Bosnia and Herzegovina, Honduras, Montenegro, Nauru, Moldova and New Zealand. Similarly, the EEA countries of Iceland, Liechtenstein, Norway, all European Union countries (except Ireland) together with Switzerland also require 3 months validity beyond the date of the bearer's intended departure unless the bearer is an EEA or Swiss national.

Countries requiring passports valid for at least 3 months on arrival include Albania, North Macedonia, Panama, and Senegal.

Bermuda requires passports to be valid for at least 45 days upon entry.

Countries that require a passport validity of at least one month beyond the date of intended departure include Eritrea, Hong Kong, Lebanon, Macau, the Maldives and South Africa.

==== Maximum passport age ====
Countries of the Schengen area require non-EU passports to be less than 10 years old upon entry.

=== Criminal record ===
Some countries, including Australia, Canada, Fiji, New Zealand and the United States, routinely deny entry to non-citizens who have a criminal record, while others impose restrictions depending on the type of conviction and the length of the sentence.

=== Persona non grata ===
The government of a country can declare a diplomat persona non grata, banning them from entering the country or expelling them if they have already entered. In non-diplomatic use, the authorities of a country may also declare a foreigner persona non grata permanently or temporarily, usually because of unlawful activity.

=== Israeli stamps ===
Kuwait, Lebanon, Libya, and Yemen do not allow entry to people with passport stamps from Israel or whose passports have either a used or an unused Israeli visa, or where there is evidence of previous travel to Israel such as entry or exit stamps from neighbouring border posts in transit countries such as Jordan and Egypt.

To circumvent this Arab League boycott of Israel, the Israeli immigration services have now mostly ceased to stamp foreign nationals' passports on either entry to or exit from Israel (unless the entry is for some work-related purposes). Since 15 January 2013, Israel no longer stamps foreign passports at Ben Gurion Airport. Passports are still (as of 22 June 2017) stamped at Erez when passing into and out of Gaza.

Iran refuses admission to holders of passports containing an Israeli visa or stamp that is less than 12 months old.

=== Biometrics ===
Several countries mandate that all travellers, or all foreign travellers, be fingerprinted on arrival and will refuse admission to or even arrest travellers who refuse to comply. In some countries, such as the United States, this may apply even to transit passengers who merely wish to change planes rather than go landside.

Fingerprinting countries/regions include Afghanistan, Argentina, Brunei, Cambodia, China, Ethiopia, Ghana, Guinea, India, Japan, Kenya (both fingerprints and a photo are taken), Malaysia upon entry and departure, Mongolia, Saudi Arabia, the Schengen Area, Singapore, South Korea, Taiwan, Thailand, Uganda, the United Arab Emirates and the United States.

Many countries also require a photo be taken of people entering the country. The United States, which does not fully implement exit control formalities at its land frontiers (although long mandated by its own legislation), intends to implement facial recognition for passengers departing from international airports to identify people who overstay their visa.

Together with fingerprint and face recognition, iris scanning is one of three biometric identification technologies internationally standardised since 2006 by the International Civil Aviation Organization (ICAO) for use in e-passports and the United Arab Emirates conducts iris scanning on visitors who need to apply for a visa. The United States Department of Homeland Security has announced plans to greatly increase the biometric data it collects at US borders. In 2018, Singapore began trials of iris scanning at three land and maritime immigration checkpoints.

== See also ==
- Visa policy of Malaysia
