= Enfinity Global (IPP) =

- Type: Private
- Industry: Energy Services
- Headquarters: Miami, Florida
- Key people: Carlos Domenech (CEO)
- Products: Energy services, renewable electricity, energy storage
- Number of employees: 350 (2025)
- Website: enfinity.global

Enfinity Global is an American independent power producer (IPP) based in Miami, Florida. Established in 2019, the company generates and commercializes electricity from its owned assets across North America, Europe, and Asia, with active assets in the United States, Italy, India, and Japan.

== History ==
Enfinity Global was founded in 2019 and is headquartered in Miami, Florida. It focuses on renewable energy development and energy storage solutions across multiple markets.

In 2019, Enfinity initiated operations in Italy, India, and Japan, building an early project pipeline of over 2 GW of greenfield solar energy projects. Over 2020 and 2021, the company extended its project funnel in India and Italy and completed the acquisition of a 250 MW solar portfolio in Japan.

By 2022, Enfinity had established its presence in the U.S. market by acquiring a 400 MW operational portfolio from Capital Dynamics, while also adding another 205 MW of operational capacity in India. That year also marked the founding of its energy storage business, with a 3 GW development funnel.

In 2023, the firm received a €400 million equity investment from ICG Infra and acquired an additional 546 MW of projects in the U.S. During the same period, Enfinity sold a minority stake in its U.S. operational portfolio to Japanese utility Kyushu Electric Power as part of its capital formation strategy to accelerate growth and optimize returns.

In January 2025, Enfinity expanded its battery energy storage pipeline by announcing two new projects in Texas with a combined capacity of 425 MW and 850 MWh of storage, scheduled for construction in 2025/2026. Later in the same year, the company sold 49 % interests in two BESS projects (380 MW total) to Daiwa Energy & Infrastructure, while retaining operational control. It also recycled capital by selling a minority stake of a 408MW portfolio in Italy to the State Oil Fund of the Republic of Azerbaijan (SOFAZ). Also in 2025, Enfinity reported securing connectivity and land for 2 GW of PV and wind projects in India.

== Operations ==
Enfinity Global operates in the United States, its largest market, where the company manages a portfolio of 23 GW, including 400 MW in operation and 466 MW under construction. Its active U.S. portfolio includes 126 MW across four solar plants in California, 140 MW across nineteen plants in North Carolina, and 134 MW across five plants in Idaho. In addition to its operating assets, Enfinity Global continues to expand its presence in the country with new solar PV and battery storage projects, including the 425 MW of battery energy storage systems (BESS) announced in Texas in January 2025, with construction scheduled to begin the same year.

In Italy, Enfinity manages an energy pipeline of 8.6 GW, with 485 MW under construction and 324 MW in operation. The active portfolio includes the Arcipretura plant in Lazio (51 MW), the Turo plant in Lazio (49 MW), and the Banditella plant in Lazio (51 MW). The company continues to expand its development activity across different Italian regions through both new projects and acquisitions.

In India, Enfinity’s portfolio includes 3.5 GW in development and permitting, 224 MW under construction, and 240 MW in operation. Its operational projects include Mahagenco in Maharashtra (135 MW), JRK Projects in Karnataka (47 MW), and Telangana SPK in Telangana (17 MW). The company also operates 17 MW of distributed rooftop solar capacity in India. In 2025, the company secured connectivity for 2 GW of utility-scale solar PV and wind projects in Rajasthan, Uttar Pradesh, Maharashtra, and Karnataka.

In Japan, Enfinity reports 366 MW in development and permitting, 26 MW under construction, and 226 MW in operation. The primary operational assets include the Aomori project in the Tohoku region (71 MW), the Osaki project in Tohoku (42 MW), and the Tano project in Kyushu (34 MW). These projects contribute to Enfinity’s presence in the Japanese renewable energy market, focused on utility-scale solar generation.

== Technology and business model ==
Enfinity employs a vertically integrated model, encompassing the construction and operation of energy production assets as well as Battery Energy Storage Systems (BESS). As an Independent Power Producer (IPP), the company produces and commercializes electricity to satisfy its customers’ growing energy demand.

=== Energy storage ===
By 2025, Enfinity’s global energy storage pipeline is approximately over 16 GW, with about 8 GW in the U.S., 6 GW in Italy, and 1.3 GW in the UK.

In January 2025, the company announced two battery energy storage system (BESS) projects in Texas totaling 425 MW (850 MWh) with two-hour discharge durations; construction was slated to begin in Q2 and Q4 20252026 in the ERCOT Houston and Dallas zones.

In June 2025, Enfinity sold 49% stakes in two BESS projects (380 MW) to Daiwa, retaining a 51% controlling interest and continuing as developer, constructor, and manager. One project is in the U.S. (250 MW, two-hour duration) and the other in Italy’s Veneto region (130 MW, four-hour duration).

=== Energy commercialization ===
Enfinity markets electricity through long-term power purchase agreements (PPAs), bilateral contracts, tenders, and spot/wholesale market participation. In 2025, it signed PPAs in Italy with a U.S. technology company for a 420 MW solar portfolio. Previously, in 2023, it had entered two 10-year PPAs with Statkraft for 225 GWh/year from 134 MW of capacity in Lazio. In the same year, it agreed with Italian utility A2A on a 97 MW deal in Lazio; in July 2024, it signed another 10-year PPA with A2A for six plants totaling 134 MW in Lazio and Emilia-Romagna. Also in 2024, it contracted with Feralpi Group in Italy to supply 23 GWh/year from a 15.5 MW plant. In addition, the company signed a 10-year agreement with the Volkswagen Group subsidiary, VW Kraftwerk, to supply 400 GWh of Guarantees of Origin (GOs) from its solar plant in Italy in 2025.

== Funding ==
In 2021, it received a $300 million facility from CarVal Investors to support early-stage project development. In 2022, Nomura underwrote nearly $300 million for a U.S. acquisition, building on an existing partnership from Japan.

In 2023, ICG Infra invested €400 million in equity to fund Enfinity’s near-term growth and the execution of its business strategy, becoming a minority shareholder.

In 2024, the company structured a €500 million club facility (expandable to €800 million) involving Infranity, Schroders Capital, Rivage, BNP Paribas Asset Management, and QIC for Italian project development. In the same year, it also closed a $245 million structured credit facility with Nomura to finance U.S. solar assets. In India, it arranged US$135 million from CPP Investments to support its project execution.

In September 2025, the company secured $341M to build portfolio of eight utility-scale solar power projects in Italy across Emilia Romagna, Basilicata, and Lazio. In addition, it closed an equity and development partnership with a European investor to deliver a 486-MW battery energy storage system (BESS) in Italy.
