= Infrastructure Development Finance Company =

Indian Financial Services company

Infrastructure Development Finance Company Limited
- Type: Section 4A
- Traded as: BSE: 532659; NSE: IDFC
- Industry: Banking, Financial services
- Founded: 1997; 29 years ago (Chennai)
- Fate: Merged with IDFC First Bank
- Successor: IDFC First Bank
- Headquarters: Chennai, Tamil Nadu, India
- Area served: India
- Services: Infrastructure Advisory and Finance; Investment banking Asset Management
- AUM: ▲₹115,000 crore (US$12 billion) (2022)
- Subsidiaries: IDFC Project Equity; IDFC First Bank; IDFC Securities; IDFC Pension Fund Management; IDFC Foundation; IDFC Institute
- Website: www.idfc.com

Infrastructure Development Finance Company Limited, more commonly known as IDFC, was a public development finance institution based in India under the Department of Financial Services, Government of India. It provided finance and advisory services for infrastructure projects, as well as asset management and investment banking.

IDFC reverse merged with IDFC First Bank on 1 October 2024.

== Company history ==
IDFC was incorporated on 30 January 1997 by Government of India, with its registered office in Chennai, and started operations on 9 June 1997. In 1998 the company registered with the Reserve Bank of India (RBI) as a Non-Banking Financial Company (NBFC). In the year 1999 the company was notified as Public Financial Institution.

In August 2005, the company's equity shares were listed on the National Stock Exchange of India (NSE) and Bombay Stock Exchange (BSE) after an initial public offering (IPO). Government of India cut down its ownership from 100% to 34.91% through the IPO, despite that it still retains majority ownership. Till 2024, Government had the controlling ownership of IDFC Ltd as per Government reports.

In May 2008, the company entered into asset management by acquiring the AMC business of Standard Chartered Bank in India, namely Standard Chartered Asset Management Company Pvt Ltd and Standard Chartered Trustee Company Pvt Ltd; the acquired companies were re-branded as IDFC Asset Management Company Pvt Ltd and IDFC AMC Trustee Company Pvt Ltd respectively.

In 2008–09, the company acquired 100% of the share capital of IDFC Capital (Singapore) Pvt Ltd. In the same year, the company established IDFC Foundation to focus on capacity building, policy advisory and sustainability initiatives.

IDFC Bank started operating banking services on 1 October 2015.

On 1 October 2024, IDFC Limited was merged with the bank, with shareholders receiving 155 shares of IDFC First Bank for every 100 IDFC Limited shares.
