= I Capital =

Malaysian weekly newsletter

i Capital
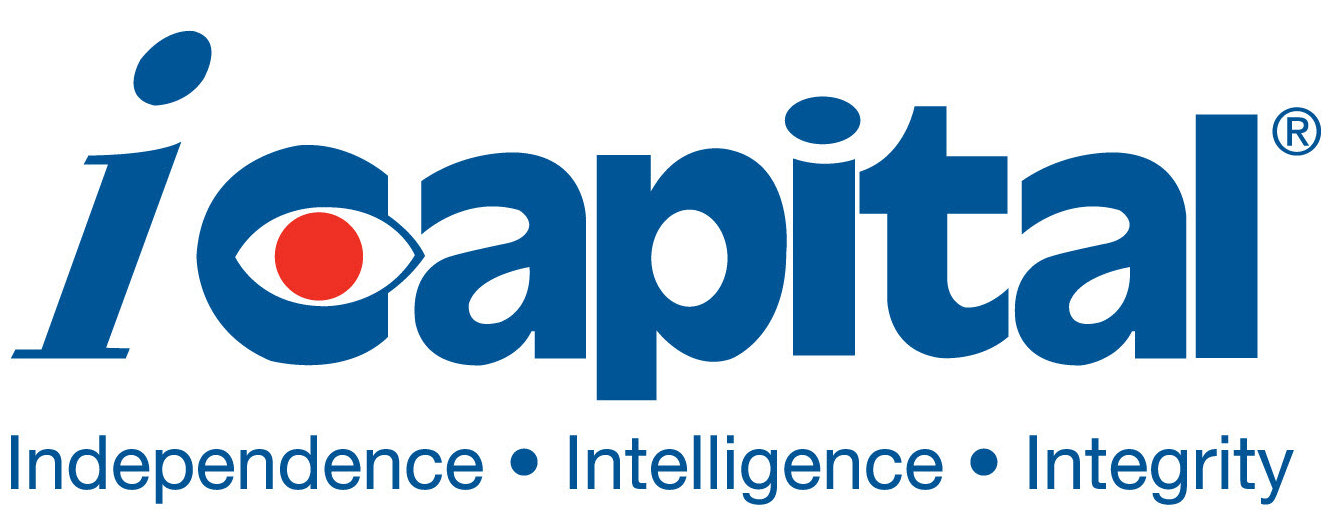
- Industry: Financial Media
- Founded: 1989 in Malaysia
- Founder: Tan Teng Boo
- Headquarters: Kuala Lumpur, Malaysia
- Area served: Weekly Stock Market Newsletter
- Key people: Tan Teng Boo
- Website: www.icapital.biz

i Capital is a weekly stock market newsletter that was started in 1989 by Capital Dynamics Sdn Bhd. It is Malaysia's first independent investment advisor and is published in English and Chinese. An electronic version was added in 2002. i Capital is renowned for its critical writing and independent viewpoint, which often sees it argue against prevailing viewpoints. An electronic version was added in 2002.
