= Malaysia Digital Arrival Card =

Digital arrival card required for most foreign visitors to Malaysia

The Malaysia Digital Arrival Card (MDAC) is an official electronic form required of most foreign travellers to Malaysia. Administered by the Immigration Department of Malaysia, MDAC became mandatory from 1 January 2024 to streamline border processing, reduce wait times, and enhance security.

== Requirements and exemptions ==
The MDAC must be submitted online no more than three days before arrival by most foreign visitors. Exemptions include:

- Citizens of Singapore;
- Malaysian citizens and permanent residents;
- Diplomats and official passport holders;
- Bruneians with General Certificate of Identity;
- Users of the Brunei–Malaysia Frequent Traveller Facility;
- Thai border-pass holders;
- Holders of Indonesian cross-border travel documents (PLB).

== Submission ==
The MDAC form is submitted via the official portal at imigresen‑online.imi.gov.my. It gathers personal information, passport details, and travel itinerary. A digital or printed MDAC must be presented upon arrival.

The MDAC is free. It is not a visa, and travellers requiring a visa must still obtain it separately.

== Fraud and warnings ==
Following the MDAC launch, Malaysian news agencies reported attempts by fake websites posing as the official MDAC portal, charging fees up to USD 80. Both government agencies and media urged travellers to use only the official portal.

== Enforcement ==
Airlines and immigration checkpoints check MDAC status prior to boarding or arrival. Failure to complete MDAC may result in delays or denied entry.

== See also ==
- Visa policy of Malaysia
