= Malaysian passport =

Passport issued to Malaysian citizens

Malaysian passport Pasport Malaysia
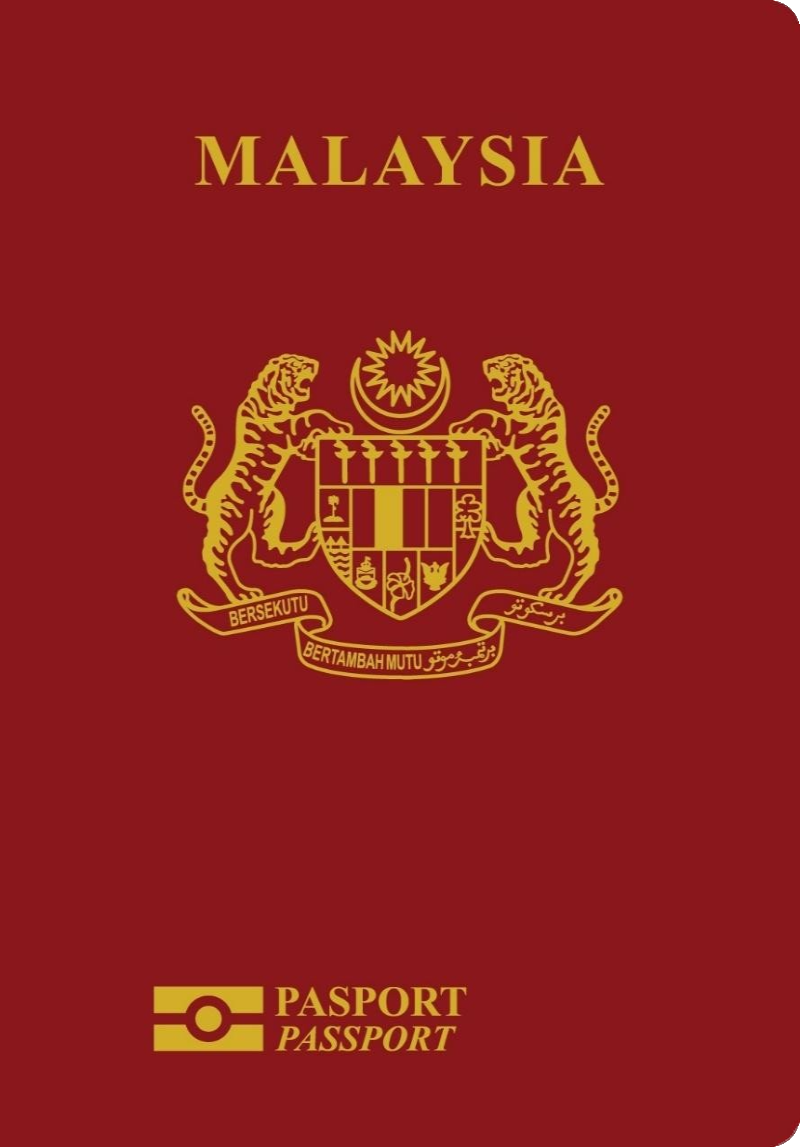
- The front cover of a contemporary Malaysian biometric passport
- Type: Passport
- Issued by: Immigration Department of Malaysia
- First issued: 1 March 1961 (first version); March 1998 (biometric passport); 2 February 2010 (ICAO Compliant); 15 November 2017 (UV element); 30 June 2026 (current update)
- Purpose: Identification
- Eligibility: Malaysian citizenship
- Expiration: 5 or 10 years from date of issue (International and restricted passports); 1 year (Border pass)
- Cost: International Passport with 5-year validity: RM200 (Aged 13-59); RM100 (Children aged 12 and below, Students aged 21 and below attending degree programs abroad, Hajj, Senior citizens aged 60 and above); Free (People with disabilities); International Passport with 10-year validity: RM350 (Aged 13-59); RM175 (Senior citizens aged 60 and above); Free (People with disabilities and Immigration Department Officers and staff); Restricted Passport: RM50; Border Pass: RM10

The Malaysian passport (Malay: Pasport Malaysia) is a travel document issued to citizens of Malaysia by the Immigration Department of Malaysia. The main legislation governing the production of passports and travel documents, their possession by persons entering and leaving Malaysia, and related matters is the Passport Act 1966.

== History ==
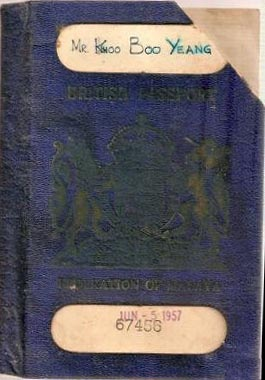
British-era Federation of Malaya passport issued in 1957

Malaysia was the first country in the world to issue biometric passports in March 1998, after a local company, IRIS Corporation, developed the technology. In December 2002, thumbprint data was added to the biometric data on the passport chip. Similar technology is used in the Malaysian identity card, MyKad.

The biometric data included on the Malaysian passport is a digital photograph of the bearer's face, and images of their two thumbprints. Malaysian immigration checkpoints were the only ones with the technology to read and authenticate the data from the RFID chip using a fingerprint scanner and facial recognition technology, but widespread adoption of ePassport technology around the world has seen the technology installed in international airports in the U.S., the UK and other countries.

In addition to biometric data and the personal information stored on the information page, the chip also records the bearer's travel history of the last ten entry and exits at Malaysia border control points.

Concern about possible "cloning" of the data from the passport chip for the purposes of identity theft prompted IRIS to issue a press release in 2006, stating that the chip and data had never been successfully cloned, and that digital keys stored on each chip made such duplication and forgery impossible.

On 2 February 2010, Malaysia started issuing ICAO compliant e-Passports, valid for five years or two years. It was the 75th nation in the world to adopt the ICAO standard. The implementation of the new passport began at offices across Klang Valley, Johor and Pahang before expanding nationwide between March and May 2010 and to foreign missions abroad between July and August 2010.

On 1 July 2026, the Malaysian government began rolling out a new version of the passport embedded with 94 security features including holograms, hidden visual elements, ultraviolet printing and enhanced polycarbonate materials, an increase from the 49 security features of the previous version. The new passport will also use a colour photograph of the passport holder.

== Types ==
In the Malay language, the name were formerly designated 'Paspot Malaysia', but the spelling was changed to 'Pasport Malaysia' in the 1980s.

=== Regular international passport ===
Regular international non-ICAO biometric passport issued from 1998 to 2010

Regular international ICAO biometric passport issued from 2010 to 2026

The regular international passport (Malay: pasport antarabangsa) is the ordinary passport issued to Malaysian citizens for international travel. It features a red cover.

The regular international passport has incorporated biometric features since 1998. The biometric passport contains an 8 kB microchip which was developed by a Malaysian technology firm, IRIS Corporation. In February 2010, the passport was updated to comply with the ICAO standard on biometric and machine-readable passports, while the pages in a 32-page passport was increased to 48 pages. Beginning April 2013, the passport underwent another round of updating by introducing a polycarbonate sheet that holds the passport bearer's information. The information is laser engraved into the polycarbonate sheet for added security, including a hologram mini-photo of the passport bearer. With this the passport now holds 50 pages instead of 48 pages. There is no more 64 pages option since 2011. A redesign of the passport's interior pages along with new security features was launched on 15 November 2017.

A 50-page ICAO e-passport valid for five years costs RM200. Senior citizens, children below 12 years old, Hajj pilgrims, and students below 21 years old with proof to study abroad are entitled to half price from normal price. Disabled people are entitled to have their passports issued free of charge.

Previously, a 50-page ICAO e-passport valid for two years was available for RM100. On 15 January 2015, the two-year passport option was scrapped in conjunction with the announcement that reduced the normal five-year passport issuance fee from RM300 to RM200. Starting from 1 July 2026, Malaysians can also choose the ten-year passport for a fee of RM350.

The passport is also used by citizens from Peninsular Malaysia to enter the East Malaysian states of Sabah and Sarawak, as these two states have autonomy in immigration affairs. However, citizens travelling directly from Peninsular Malaysia may produce a Malaysian identity card, or birth certificate for children below 12 years, obtain a special immigration printout form (Document in Lieu of Internal Travel Document, IMM.114) at immigration counters for social/business visits up to 3 months, and keep the form until departure.

As of May 2026, The Malaysian passport is ranked 6th in the Henley Passport Index and has a Passport Power Rank of 3 in the Passport Index.

=== Restricted passport ===
Restricted passport

The restricted passport (pasport terhad) is issued to Malaysian citizens for travel to a specific country only. They have blue covers.

Currently only a restricted passport for travel to Brunei is issued. Malaysian citizens residing in the East Malaysian areas of Sarawak, Sabah and Labuan are eligible to apply for the restricted passport. The passport is valid for five years and costs RM50.

=== Official passport ===
The official passport (pasport rasmi) is issued exclusively to Malaysian government officials travelling on official business. It is issued by the Immigration Department of Malaysia upon request through the Ministry of Foreign Affairs (Wisma Putra).

=== Diplomatic passport ===
The diplomatic passport (pasport diplomatik) is issued to diplomatic officers.

=== Other travel documents ===
Malaysia also issues a few travel documents that has similar but more limited purpose than those of passports, for internal or external usage related with the border control of the country.

==== Border passes ====
Border passes are similar to restricted passports, in terms of limited applicable citizens, limited country access and also its appearance (a passport book with a blue cover) however compared to restricted passports or other passports, they can only be used for short visits and are not valid for other purposes. They also have a shorter validity period.

Border Pass (Pas Sempadan) for Thailand is limited to citizens living in Perlis, Kedah, Kelantan, and the Hulu Perak District of Perak for land entry into Thailand and applicable only when travelling into its 5 southern provinces by sea or land: Songkhla, Satun, Narathiwat, Yala and Pattani for 30 days of each entry. It has a validity of 1 year and costs RM10 each time.

Border Crossing Pass (Pas Lintas Sempadan) is another border pass issued only for citizens in East Malaysian districts that has close proximity to Indonesian land borders: Kuching, Bau, Lundu Serian, Simanggang and Lubuk Antu in Sarawak and Pensiangan, Tawau, Tenom and Sipitang in Sabah and limited for short visits via land or sea entry in the Indonesian Kalimantan provinces (mainly the checkpoints in West and North Kalimantan). It also has a validity of 1 year and cost RM10 each.

==== Group travel document ====
A group travel document is issued as a singular replacement for international passport for groups in 5 to 20 members for land travels to Thailand and Singapore. It is only valid for single entry up to 9 months prior to its issuance and costs RM200 for each copy.

==== Internal travel documents ====
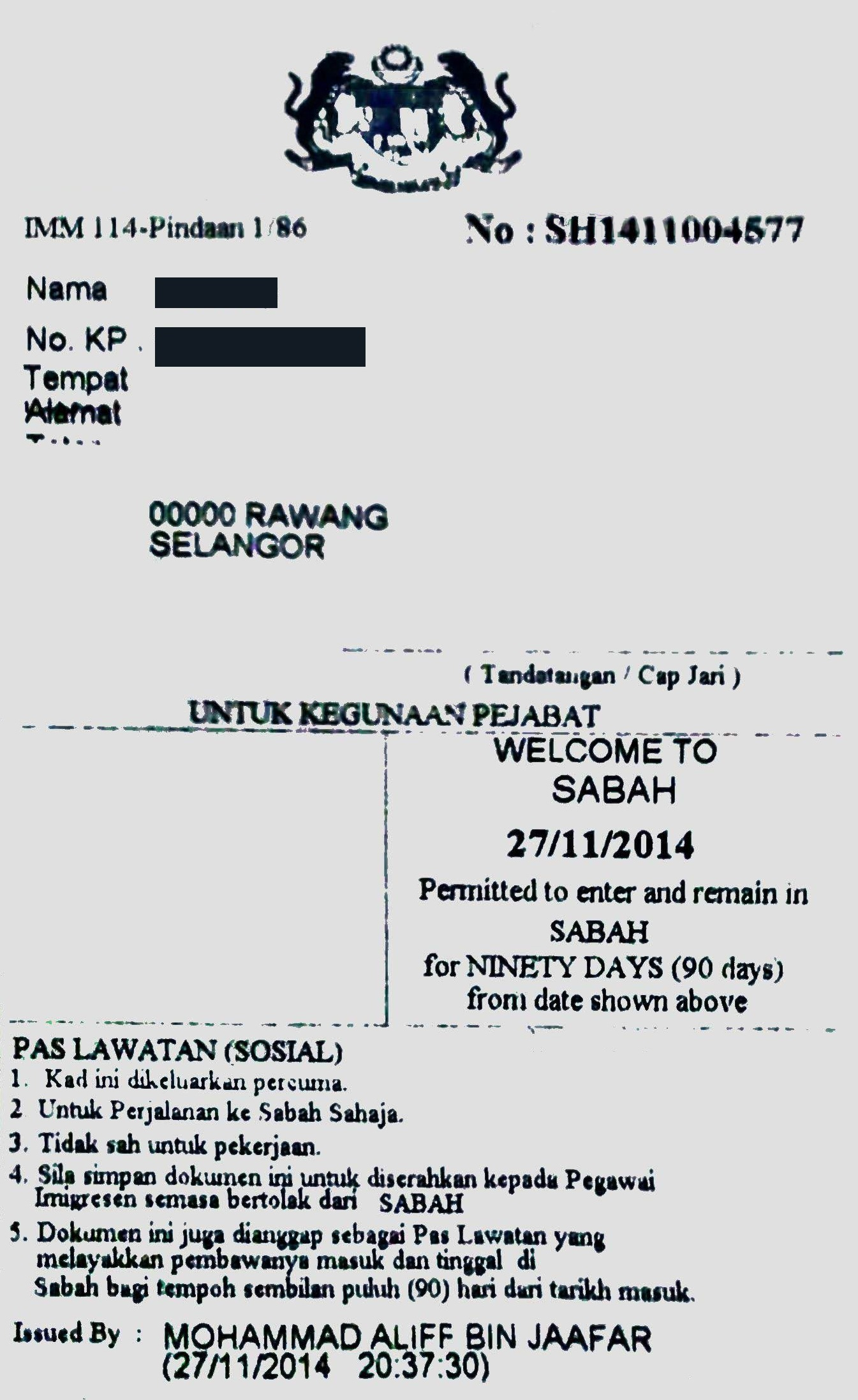
Document In Lieu of Internal Travel Document (IMM.114)

Due to unique circumstances of Sabah and Sarawak in terms of immigration control, internal documents has been issued for domestic travellers in Malaysia when going in or out these two states without using regular international passport.

Document in Lieu of Internal Travel Document, IMM.114 (Dokumen Gantian Perjalanan) is a printout document issued by the Immigration at Sabah and Sarawak entry checkpoints for citizens out of their respective states when the Malaysian identity card is used on entry. This document, allow visitors a 90-days social visit pass, and is valid for single entry. This printout need to be kept by its holders until their departure from each of those states, where it will be returned on clearance.

For visitors who intended to stay for a longer period, or are working instead in these states, a document called Restricted Travel Document (Dokumen Perjalanan Terhad) is used instead. It is a passport book with a blue cover which records arrival and departure record of entering Sabah and/or Sarawak and stores any type of visa information given by the two states when applicable. It costs RM5 for each application and can be applied beforehand in selected issuing offices in Peninsular Malaysia, Sabah and Sarawak, with validity is for multiple entries up to 5 years, extendable to another 5 years.

Sabah and Sarawak citizens who are entering their respective state are not required to use or keep these documents otherwise on checkpoint (identity card is sufficient), nor they are needed to apply for any if they are staying or working in Peninsular Malaysia.

==== Emergency Certificate ====
An Emergency Certificate (Sijil Perakuan Cemas) is a type of travel document issued by selected embassies, high commissions or consulates of Malaysia in other countries in case of its citizens losing their passports outside of Malaysia, for them to be able to have a proper document while still staying in those countries and going back to Malaysia.

It is only valid for a single journey to Malaysia, with valid countries follows the departing countries, transiting countries (if any), and Malaysia immigration only.

=== Discontinued types ===
Previously, a restricted passport was issued for travel to Singapore. From 1 January 2005, the Immigration Department stopped issuing and renewing the restricted passport to Singapore, with existing passports to remain valid until 31 December 2006. However, as Singapore requires travel documents to be valid for a minimum of six months, Singapore announced it would stop accepting Malaysian restricted passports from 1 July 2006. Following a meeting between the home affairs ministers of both countries, Singapore agreed to extend the deadline to 1 November 2006. Malaysian citizens travelling to Singapore now use the regular international passport.

The green cover Hajj passport (pasport haji) was formerly issued to Malaysian Muslim citizens for a Hajj pilgrimage to Mecca, Saudi Arabia. Applications were made through Tabung Haji, the Malaysian Hajj pilgrims fund board. Hajj passports were discontinued in 2009 and pilgrims now use the regular international passport.

The British-era Federation of Malaya passports were issued when Malaysia was Malaya and under British rule.

== Passport design ==
The data page/information page are printed in Malay and English.

=== Passport note ===
The passports contain a note, written in Malay and English, from the issuing state that is addressed to the authorities of all other states, identifying the bearer as a citizen of that state and requesting that he or she be allowed to pass and be treated according to international norms. In Malay, the note inside Malaysian passports reads:

Bahawasanya atas nama Seri Paduka Baginda Yang di-Pertuan Agong Malaysia, diminta semua yang berkaitan supaya membenarkan pembawa pasport ini melalui negara berkenaan dengan bebas tanpa halangan atau sekatan dan memberikan sebarang pertolongan dan perlindungan yang perlu kepadanya.

and in English, the note reads:

This is to request and require in the name of His Majesty the Yang di-Pertuan Agong of Malaysia, all whom it may concern to allow the bearer of this passport to pass freely without let or hindrance, and to afford the bearer such assistance and protection as may be necessary.

=== Identity information page ===
The Malaysian passport includes the following data:

- Type/Jenis ('P' for Passport)
- Country code/Kod Negara ('MYS' for Malaysia)
- Passport number/Nombor Pasport
- Name of bearer/Nama (see below for details of the naming scheme)
- Nationality ('Malaysia')
- Identity number (see below for more information) or Birth certificate number (for minors under 12 only)
- Place of birth (State of birth for citizens born in Malaysia)
- Date of birth (in DD-MMM-YYYY format, such as 24-JUN-1988)
- Sex ('M' or 'F')
- Date of issue (in DD-MMM-YYYY format)
- Date of expiry (in DD-MMM-YYYY format, 5 years or 10 years from date of issue, or a maximum of 5 or 10 years 6 months for renewals)
- Issuing office
- Height/Tinggi (in centimetres)

=== Passport number ===
The passport number is the serial number that uniquely identifies a passport. The passport number changes every time a person is issued a new passport, with the previous passport number noted in an endorsement on the last page of the new passport.

The passport number is alphanumeric, with a letter followed by an eight-digit number, e.g. A00000000. The letter prefix depends on the residency status of the bearer: "A" for Peninsular Malaysia and Labuan, "H" for Sabah and "K" for Sarawak. From 1964 to 1965, when Singapore was a part of Malaysia, Singapore citizens were issued Malaysian passports with the prefix "E".

=== Naming scheme issue ===
Due to Malaysia's heterogeneous ethnic demographic, including substantial Chinese and Indian minorities as well as Malays, the name of the bearer on the Malaysian passport is displayed using that person's customary naming practice as it is on the person's identity card (MyKad) or birth certificate (with exception of ethnic Indian and Thai names). Surname and given name fields are not differentiated on the passport, and this can cause difficulties or confusion in some countries as the placement of the surname is not consistent.

Technically speaking, every Malaysian name regardless of the ethnicity is of this type: SURNAME, FIRST NAME UNKNOWN (FNU) when only the Machine Readable Zone (MRZ) area of the Passport Biodata Page is considered. There is no '<<' to isolate what is technically a 'Surname' from the 'Given Name' (Please note that ICAO standards require that the name that immediately follows the three-letters country code in the Machine Readable Zone (MRZ) to be the surname of the passport holder). When swiped at international airports for border security purposes, for example: the Advanced Passenger Information System (APIS) for countries such as Australia, New Zealand and United States, the name of a Malaysian passport holder in its entirety will be captured in the 'Surname' field of the border security system, and this can sometimes cause a mismatch with how the passport holder's name is captured in the country of destination's visa system or electronic travel authority protocol. Examples of Malaysian names as printed on the Machine Readable Zone (MRZ) of the passport:

1. P<MYSALI<AKBAR<BIN<MOHAMAD< (for ALI AKBAR BIN MOHAMAD)
2. P<MYSDAVID<WONG<KIM<SIONG< (for DAVID WONG KIM SIONG)
3. P<MYSMEGAT<HASAN<BIN<MEGAT<TERMIZI< (for MEGAT HASAN BIN MEGAT TERMIZI)
4. P<MYSSUGUMARAN<SIVANATHAN< (for SUGUMARAN A/L SIVANATHAN)
5. P<MYSFATIMAH<BINTI<HUSIN< (for FATIMAH BINTI HUSIN)
6. P<MYSJOHN<ANAK<LANGKAU< (for JOHN ANAK LANGKAU)
7. P<MYSSTANLEY<BIN<JOSEPH< (for STANLEY BIN JOSEPH)
8. P<MYSSIVASANGEETHA<SIVASANGEETHA<THANABALAN< (for SIVASANGEETHA A/P THANABALAN)
9. P<MYSABDUL<AZIZ<RAHMAN<KHAN<BIN<SULTAN<KHAN (for ABDUL AZIZ RAHMAN KHAN BIN SULTAN KHAN)
10. P<MYSLORENZO<LUCA<ROSSI< (for LORENZO LUCA ROSSI)
11. P<MYSELENA<ANAIS<HADID< (for ELENA ANAIS HADID)

As can be seen from the above examples, it's evident that a name in a Malaysian Passport technically does not contain 'Given Name(s)' because '<<' is not used at all to isolate Surname from Given Names.

Below is a comparison of how similar names are recorded in the Australian Passport:

The Australian Passport explicitly differentiates 'Surname' from 'Given Name'. The Machine Readable Zone (MRZ) is very clear in regards the passport holder's Surnames. Examples of Australian names as printed on the Machine Readable Zone (MRZ) of the passport:

1. P<AUSSMITH<<JOHN<WILLIAM< (for John William SMITH)
2. P<AUSIBRAHIM<<JOHN<AHMED< (for John Ahmed IBRAHIM)
3. P<AUSWONG<<PHILLIPA<SIEW<MEI< (for Phillipa Siew Mei WONG)
4. P<AUSMALOUF<<DAVID<ISAAK< (for David Isaak MALOUF)
5. P<AUSMORAN<<EVELYN<LILY<ELIZABETH< (for Evelyn Lily Elizabeth MORAN)
6. P<AUSRIZZI<<PAULO<ANTONIO (for Paulo Antonio RIZZI)
7. P<AUSVAN<DER<BERGH<<JOHN<DAVID< (for John David VAN DER BERGH)
8. P<AUSABU<HASSAN<<SAEMAN<NGASRI (for Saeman Ngasri ABU HASSAN)
9. P<AUSSUPARMAN<<HARYANTO<WIRA< (for Haryanto Wira SUPARMAN)
10. P<AUSKIM<<BAE<JYEON< (for Bae Jyeon KIM)

Notes: 'P' stands for Passport. 'MYS' and 'AUS' stand for Malaysia and Australia respectively in the Machine Readable Zone. For clarity: Surnames in block letters and Given Names in title case for examples of Australian names.

In Malaysian passports, the bearer's name may be ordered in the following sequence:

- Indian and Thai names: On the national identity card MyKad and birth certificates, Indian and Thai names are generally in the format "X A/L Y" or "X A/P Y" where 'A/L' stands for 'anak lelaki' (Malay for 'son of') and 'A/P' stands for 'anak perempuan' (Malay for 'daughter of'). On the passport detail page, the "A/L" or "A/P" designation is omitted. However, the bearer's full name as on his/her MyKad is noted on the observation page.
- Chinese names: Can be listed in three ways according to the individual's preference: surname first as is customary (surname first, then Chinese given names: "WONG Kim Siong"), surname between given names (non-Chinese derived name, surname, Chinese given names: "David WONG Kim Siong"), or in the Western style of surname last (David WONG)
- Malay names: Generally in the format "X BIN/BINTI Y", where 'BIN' means 'son of' and 'BINTI' means 'daughter of', similar to the Arabic name system. This practice is not limited to Muslim Malays however, and can also be found in Christian indigenous Sabahans and Melanaus of Sarawak.
- Native Sarawakian and Orang Asli names: Generally in the format "X ANAK Y" or "X AK Y" where 'Anak' or 'AK' means 'child of'. 'AK' abbreviation for 'ANAK'
- Western/European names: Eurasian Malaysians, or those descended from British, Portuguese or Dutch settlers, have the person's hereditary surname last ("Robert SMITH").

=== Identity number ===
The Malaysian identity number is a unique ID number allocated to each Malaysian, and is the same number on the bearer's MyKad, the Malaysian national identity card. The number is in the following format:

YYMMDD-BP-###G

- The first six digits (YYMMDD) are the date of birth of the holder, so for example 24 June 1988 would be represented as 880624.
- The next two digits (BP) are the numeric code indicating the state or country of birth.
- The last four digits are randomly generated serial numbers, and the last digit (represented above by 'G') is a gender indicator: an odd number for males and an even number for females.

On the passport information page, the identity number is written without hyphens, e.g. YYMMDD-BP-###G is written as YYMMDDBP###G.

== Visa requirements ==
Countries and territories with visa-free entries or visas on arrival for holders of regular Malaysian passports. Malaysia Visa not required Visa on arrival eVisa Visa available both on arrival or online Visa required prior to arrival Travel banned by the Malaysian government due to safety concerns or admission refused

Visa requirements for Malaysian citizens are administrative entry restrictions by the authorities of other states placed on citizens of Malaysia. As of 2026, Malaysian citizens had visa-free or visa on arrival access to 183 countries and territories, ranking the Malaysian passport 6th in the world according to the Henley Passport Index.

This makes it the 2nd highest-ranked passport in Southeast Asia after the Singaporean passport, the 5th highest-ranked in Asia and the highest-ranked passport in the developing world and 2nd among Muslim-majority countries. Additionally, Arton Capital's Passport Index ranked the Malaysian passport 3rd, tied with 15 other countries, in the world in terms of travel freedom, with a visa-free score of 174 countries & territories as of November 2025.

=== Limitations and denials ===
Malaysian citizens are not eligible for the U.S Visa Waiver Program (VVP) and requires a visa for Canada, both of which are available for Bruneian and Singaporean citizens. There has also been increasing cases of Malaysian citizens being specifically denied entry in countries whereby they are de jure permitted visa-free, such as in Australia and South Korea, due to high amounts of visa overstays and frivolous asylum claims among Malaysian citizens. In 2025, two Malaysians were charged in South Korea for brokering fraudulent refugee applications for 320 fellow Malaysians.

=== Restrictions on travel ===
==== Israel ====
As Malaysia does not recognize nor have diplomatic relations with the state of Israel, Malaysian passports bear the inscription: "This passport is valid for all countries except Israel". Additionally, Israeli passport holders are not permitted to enter Malaysia unless written permission from the Malaysian Ministry of Home Affairs is granted.

Officially, the Malaysian government allows Malaysian citizens that are Christians to visit Israel for religious purposes. In 2009, the government imposed a ban on visits to Israel, ostensibly due to heightened security risks posed by the Israeli–Palestinian conflict. The ban was lifted in 2011, albeit with restrictions such as a quota of 700 pilgrims per year with not more than 40 pilgrims per church group, and pilgrims must be at least 18 years old and not visiting Israel more than once every three years with each stay a maximum of 10 days. In 2013, the government announced a relaxation of the ban, which lifted most of the restrictions while increasing the maximum duration of stay to 21 days, subject to the security situation in Israel.

However, the restrictions imposed by the Malaysian government do not prevent Israel from issuing visa on a separate sheet of paper to Malaysian citizens regardless of religion for entering Israel, and thousands of Malaysians are known to have visited Israel with or without permission from the Malaysian government. In addition, there have been instances of Israelis entering Malaysia without official authorisation, despite Malaysia's non-recognition of Israel and the de jure prohibition on Israeli entry. This has been possible in part due to Israel's allowance of multiple citizenships.

==== North Korea ====
Following the assassination of Kim Jong-nam in 2017, Malaysia banned all Malaysian citizens from travelling to North Korea, in the wake of strained Malaysia–North Korea relations.

==== Communist countries and South Africa (formerly) ====
Previously, Malaysian passports were not valid for travel to various communist countries, and South Africa due to its apartheid system. Following the fall of communism in Eastern Europe and improving ties with the remaining communist countries, as well as the end of apartheid in 1994, the countries were removed from the list.

== See also ==
- Visa requirements for Malaysian citizens
- Visa policy of Malaysia
