= Zero-load =

Mutual fund with no commission charge

Zero-load refers to a mutual fund that charges no commission or sales charge. Instead of using a secondary party shares are generally distributed directly by the investment company. Research has shown that there is little difference in the performance of zero-load funds in comparison to load funds. However, as an investor in a load fund has to pay out fees to buy in or out, a load fund must perform better in order for the investor to get the same outcome. This means that in essence a zero-load fund starts the 'investment race' with a headstart.
