= Immigration Act 1959/63 =

Malaysian law

Parliament of Malaysia
- Long title: An Act relating to immigration
- Citation: Act 155
- Territorial extent: Throughout Malaysia
- Enacted by: Dewan Rakyat
- Enacted: 1959 (Ordinance No. 12 of 1959, Act No. 27 of 1963 and F.L.N. 226 of 1963); Revised: 1975 (Act 155 w.e.f. 1 May 1975)
- Enacted by: Dewan Negara
- Effective: [Peninsular Malaysia—1 May 1959; Sabah and Sarawak—16 September 1963]

Amended by
- Immigration (Amendment) Act 1961 [Act 6/1961] Immigration (Transitional Provisions) Order 1963 [L.N. 226/1963] Immigration Act 1963 [Act 27/1963] Immigration (Amendment) Act 1965 [Act 15/1965] Immigration (Amendment) Act 1966 [Act 7/1966] Essential (Immigration) (Borneo States) Regulations 1969 [P.U. (A) 179/1969] Essential (Modifications of Immigration Laws) Regulations 1969 [P.U. (A) 238/1969] Essential (Modifications of Immigration Laws) (Amendment) Regulations 1969 [P.U. (A) 404/1969] Notification under section 3 of the Titles of Office Ordinance 1949 [P.U. (B) 324/1970] Immigration (Amendment) Act 1971 [Act A82] Notification under section 3 of the Titles of Office Ordinance 1949 [P.U. (A) 209/1971] Immigration (Amendment) Act 1973 [Act A191] Malaysian Currency (Ringgit) Act 1975 [Act 160] Criminal Procedure Code (Amendment and Extension) Act 1976 [Act A324] Subordinate Courts Act (Extension) Order 1980 [P.U. (A) 357/1980] Federal Territory of Labuan (Modification of Immigration Act) Order 1984 [P.U. (A) 160/1984] Immigration (Amendment) Act 1989 [Act A719] Constitution (Amendment) Act 1994 [Act A885] Immigration (Amendment) Act 1997 [Act A985] Revision of Laws (Rectification of Immigration Act 1959/63) Order 2002 [P.U. (A) 282/2002] Immigration (Amendment) Act 2002 [Act A1154]

Related legislation
- Federation of Malaya Immigration Ordinance 1952 [Ord. 68 of 1952] Sabah Immigration Ordinance 1962 [Ord. 1 of 1962] Sarawak Immigration Ordinance [Cap. 15]
- Status: In force

The Immigration Act 1959/63 (Malay: Akta Imigresen 1959/63), is a Malaysian law which relates to immigration.

== Structure ==
The Immigration Act 1959/63, in its current form (1 January 2006), consists of 7 Parts containing 74 sections and no schedule (including 20 amendments).

- Part I: Preliminary
- Part II: Admission into and Departure from Malaysia
- Part III: Entry Permits
- Part IV: Procedure on Arrival in Malaysia
- Part V: Removal from Malaysia
- Part VI: Miscellaneous
- Part VII: Special Provisions for East Malaysia
  - Chapter 1: General
  - Chapter 2: Special Provisions
  - Chapter 3: Supplementary

== See also ==
- Immigration Act
