= Immigration Department of Malaysia =

Government department of Malaysia

Immigration Department of Malaysia Jabatan Imigresen Malaysia
- Logo of the Immigration Department of Malaysia

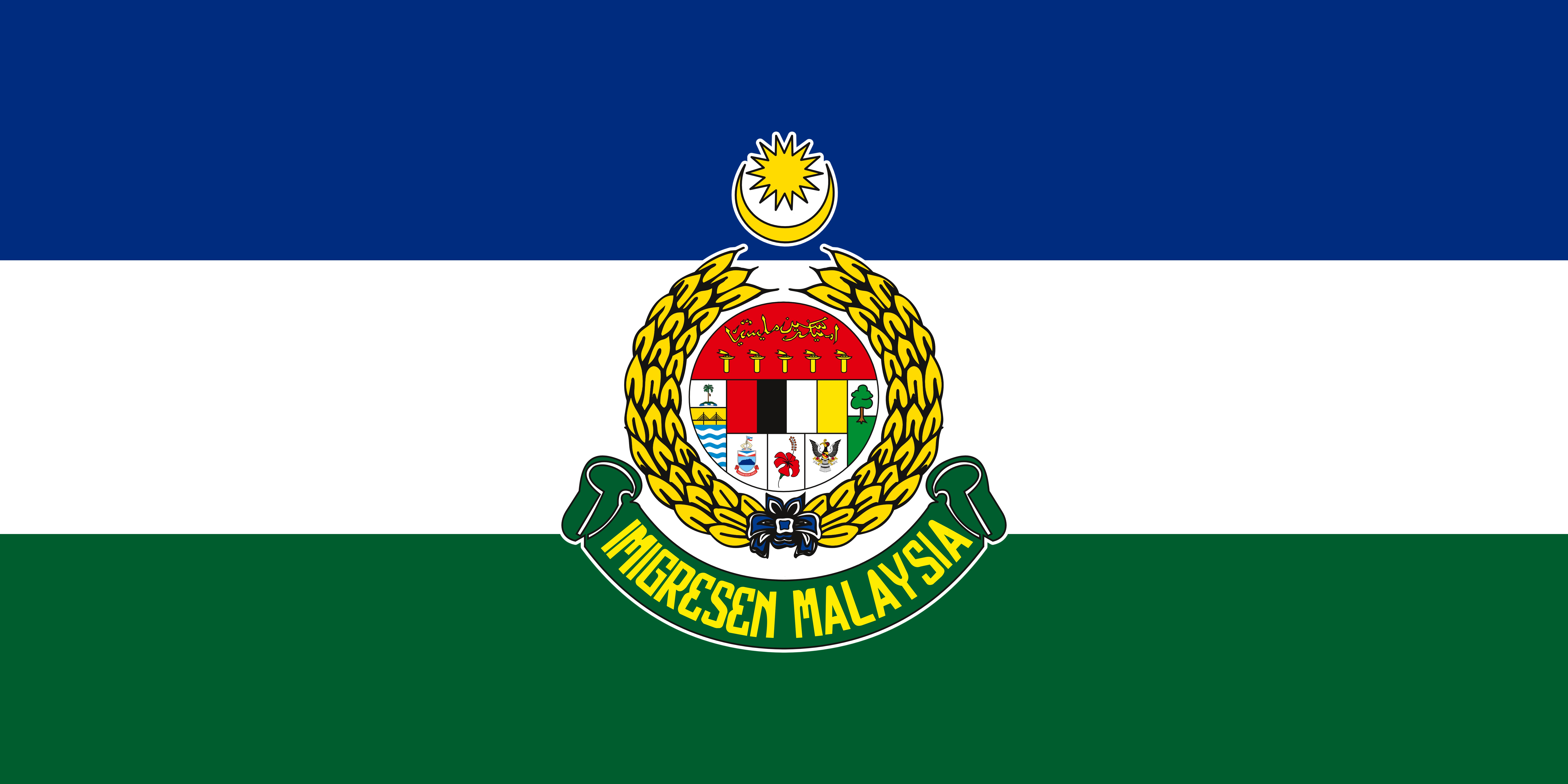
- Flag of the Immigration Department of Malaysia
- Abbreviation: JIM
- Motto: Kedaulatan dan Keselamatan Negara Tanggungjawab Bersama (The Nation's Sovereignty and Security Is a Shared Responsibility)

Agency overview
- Formed: 21 July 1922; 104 years ago

Jurisdictional structure
- National agency: Malaysia
- Operations jurisdiction: Malaysia
- Governing body: Government of Malaysia
- Constituting instruments: Immigration Act 1959/63; Passports Act 1966
- Specialist jurisdiction: Immigration

Operational structure
- Headquarters: Level 1–7 (Podium) & Level 1–4 (Menara) No 15, Persiaran Perdana, Precinct 2, 62550 Putrajaya
- Elected officer responsible: Saifuddin Nasution Ismail, Minister of Home Affairs
- Agency executive: Zakaria Shaaban, Director General of Immigration
- Parent agency: Ministry of Home Affairs

Website
- www.imi.gov.my

The Immigration Department of Malaysia (Malay: Jabatan Imigresen Malaysia, JIM) is a department of the Malaysian federal government that provides services to Malaysian citizens, permanent residents and foreign visitors. The department is responsible for issuing passports, travel documents, visas, passes and permits; administering and managing the movement of people at authorised entry and exit points; and enforcing immigration legislation including the Immigration Act 1959/63 and the Passport Act 1966. The department is a section of the Ministry of Home Affairs.

== History ==
In the early years before World War II, the Immigration Department conducted surveillance and inspection work involving the inspection of travellers and travel documents at entry points. Immigration matters were administered by a senior officer of the Malayan Civil Service who bore the title "Immigration Officer of the Straits Settlement and Federated Malay States". He was assisted by the deputy immigration officer, temporarily seconded to the post. They were based in Penang, which was the main entry point into Malaya. Other entry points were Changloon, Padang Besar, Kroh and Port Swettenham. The administrative centre was based in Singapore.

After the World War II, the immigration department was known as the Refugees and Disposal Persons Bureau which was based in Kuala Lumpur and led by a British Military Administration Officer. Its main role was to bring people stranded in other countries back to Malaysia.

The first immigration law was the Passenger Restriction Ordinance, enforced on 21 July 1922 to regulate entries into this country. In 1930, the Aliens Immigration Restriction Ordinance was enacted to regulate the arrivals and monitor the labourers, especially from China where the quota system was used. The Aliens Ordinance 1932 took effect on 1 April 1933. A treaty on the formation of the Federation of Malaya and the Declaration of Emergency in 1948 led to a better immigration and passport laws, which comprise the following:

- The Emergency (travel restriction) Regulations, 1948
- The Passport Ordinance, 1949
- The Passport Regulations, 1949
- The Emergency Regulations, 1949

The immigration laws used during the state of emergency were replaced by the Immigration Ordinance in 1952. It became the main immigration law used to regulate and monitor the entries of all British nationals, people under the British colony and aliens to the Federation of Malaya. The law was also enforced in Singapore. The Immigration Department was then placed under the administration of the Ministry of Foreign Affairs. The department was also responsible for the following:

- Issuing of passports at the passport issuing offices in Singapore, Penang, Residents' Offices and the office of the British advisor
- Issuance of visas and citizenship applications for Commonwealth countries on behalf of the British government

After independence, The Immigration Ordinance 1959, The Immigration Regulations 1959 and The Passport Ordinance 1960 were introduced to replace The Immigration Ordinance 1949. These laws provided greater power for regulating the entry of foreigners and visitors into the Federation of Malaya.

The formation of Malaysia in 1963 had extended the immigration requirements to the states of Sabah and Sarawak. The Immigration (Transitional Provisions) Act 1963 was enacted to protect the interests of both States. Apart from regulating and controlling the entry and exit of non citizens, the Sabah and Sarawak's immigration office also controlled the entry of Malaysian citizens originating from Peninsular Malaysia (West Malaysia).

In 1964, the management of immigration matters was placed under the Ministry of Home Affairs. The administration was handed over to a Malaysian. Mr. Ibrahim bin Ali was appointed as the first National Immigration Controller. The appointment took place on 1 January 1967. Starting from 13 April 1965, the immigration head office was located at Jalan Tugu, Kuala Lumpur.

On 1 December 1971, immigration administrative matters of the Malay States came under the Malaysian Immigration Headquarters. The immigration laws enforced at that time were reviewed and in 1974, a special provision for the states of Sabah and Sarawak was included. The Immigration Act 1959/63 (Act No. 155) and the Passport Act 1966 (Act No. 150) were used nationwide. These Acts were revised and amended from time to time according to the current situation and need. The title Immigration Controller was replaced with the Director General of Immigration in 1969.

== Organisation ==
Since its establishment in 1947, the Headquarters of the Immigration Department of Malaysia was in Penang. On 13 April 1965, the Immigration Headquarters was transferred to Jalan Tugu, Kuala Lumpur. In January 1981, the office moved to BUKOTA Building, Jalan Pantai Baharu, Kuala Lumpur, before moving to Pusat Bandar Damansara, Kuala Lumpur in 1988.

Now, the headquarters of the Immigration Department of Malaysia are located at Putrajaya. The move of premises started in September 2004 and it was done in stages to ensure that the quality of services to the public was maintained.

=== Pasukan Kawalan Khas ===
Immigration Department introduced the Special Control Team (Malay: Pasukan Kawalan Khas), which was established to address critical situations, including prisoner riots and safeguarding department officials and VIPs.

They undergo immigration training modules of the Federal Reserve Unit (FRU) of the Royal Malaysia Police (RMP). Trainees are divided into two groups, those specializing in Prevent Riots and Close Quarter Battle (CQB) skills, and those specializing in martial arts and unarmed combat situations for dangerous and high-risk operations.

The team undergoes training under a teaching staff composed of a mix of professional trainers commissioned from abroad along with a former police trainer and former FRU trainers.

The team that received anti-riot training and skills in using T-batons, handcuffs, and pepper spray was trained by qualified experts.

Equipped with digital uniforms and firearms for unexpected situations, the Bravo platoon is assigned as the Tandem control team for high-risk situations involving dignitaries, either from within or outside the department.

Their services may be required to accompany team superiors and the operations department in the event of a likely terrorist attack.

== List of directors-general ==
No.	Name	Term of office
Immigration Officer
1	B. S. Davies	1932–1938
2	A. B. Roche	1933–1953
3	D. W. Bigley	1953–1967
4	Tan Sri Ibrahim bin Ali	1967–1969
Director-General of Immigration
5	Dato' Mohamed Khalil bin Haji Hussein	1969–1976
6	Haji Hashim bin Naemat	1976–1979
7	Dato' Haji Mohd Amir bin Haji Yaakub	1979–1980
8	Dato' Abdul Jabid bin Mohd Don	1980–1985
9	Dato' Abdul Halim bin Abdul Rauf	1985–1987
10	Dato' Abdul Malek bin Abd Aziz	1987–1988
11	Dato' Syed Alwi bin Syed Nordin	1988–1990
12	Dato' Syed Danial bin Syed Ahmad	1990–1993
13	Dato' Haji Mohamed Zakri bin Abdul Rashid	1993–1998
14	Tan Sri Dato' Seri Dr Aseh bin Haji Che Mat	1998–2001
15	Tan Sri Dato' Haji Mohd Jamal bin Kamdi	2001–2006
16	Dato' Raja Azhar bin Raja Abdul Manap	April–September 2006
17	Datuk Wahid bin Md Don	1 October 2006 – 13 July 2008
18	Datuk Mahmood bin Adam	21 July 2008 – 12 May 2009
19	Datuk Abdul Rahman bin Osman	12 May 2009 – 15 October 2010
20	Dato' Sri Alias bin Ahmad	15 October 2010 – 5 February 2014
21	Dato' Aloyah binti Mamat	5 February 2014 – 14 November 2014
22	Dato' Sri Mustafa bin Ibrahim	14 November 2014 – 2 February 2016
23	Dato' Sri Sakib bin Kusmi	2 February 2016 – 1 August 2016
24	Datuk Seri Mustafar bin Ali	1 August 2016 – 31 December 2018
25	Dato' Sri Khairul Dzaimee bin Daud	14 January 2019 – 22 March 2023
26	Dato' Ruslin bin Jusoh	22 March 2023 – 17 September 2024
27	Dato' Zakaria bin Shaaban	17 September 2024 – Incumbent

== Immigration Detention Centre ==
Non-citizens who are considered to have committed offences are held in immigration detention facilities, located in every state in Malaysia, to further investigation and repatriation to the country of origin.

== Uniforms ==
Since the 1960s, immigration officials use white uniform and dark blue uniform color. In early 2013 a new color uniform immigration officers have been converted to black overall.

Features new uniforms are black beret, badge over the left shoulder and right, tags and badges on the chest to the right service. They have also introduced digital uniforms for enforcement duties and tasks in the immigration detention centre.

The need to change uniforms was deemed necessary as the previous white and dark blue uniforms have remained in service since the 1960s. In addition, the application ranks were changed to avoid confusion with the ranks of other agencies.

Immigration officers working in detention centres receive training tactics and techniques to control prisoners, unarmed combat, training T-baton and so by certified trainers from within and outside the department.

== Equipment ==
Hiatt speedcuffs, T-baton, LED flashlight, riot shields, helmets and walkie-talkies are supplied to the officer when on duty to enforce immigration law. The need for better weapons is necessary to ensure the safety of officers during the operation and control of detainees in immigration detention.

The Department of Immigration bear firearms, but not all immigration officers are supplied with them. Immigration officers are licensed by the particular State Immigration Director to carry firearms in the possession of immigration like the standard issued ones:

Model	Type	Origin
Smith & Wesson Model 15	Revolver	United States
Heckler & Koch USP Compact	Semi-automatic pistol	Germany
Vektor SP1	Semi-automatic pistol	South Africa
Remington 870	Shotgun	United States
Mossberg 500	Shotgun	United States
Franchi SPAS-12	Shotgun	Italy

Reported that Immigration only have 190 of them carry firearms, compare to their 14,000 personnel. Immigration officers also not supplied with rifles, SMGs and carbines.

There is no indication that immigration will use better weapons with better firepower such as those used by Royal Malaysia Police, Malaysia Anti Corruption Commission, Royal Malaysian Customs or Malaysian Prison Department. However, as of 2014 the need for superior weapons and better equipment were planned.

== Controversies ==
=== Corruption ===
The Immigration Department of Malaysia like other enforcement agencies, have been linked with several corruption cases. The situation is improving towards positivity with time as many approaches from the government.

Despite the Malaysian government's desire to promote an image of Malaysia as a progressive nation, widespread abuses of immigration controls since at least the 2000s have somehow sullied that image.

In 2016, massive corruption was discovered involving the disabling of the national electronic security system at Malaysia's international airports by several groups, including a few immigration officers profiting from bribes by human trafficking syndicates to allow illegal passage of migrants into the country, raising questions about the system's effectiveness at keeping terrorists from streaming into Malaysia.

In late February 2021, the Immigration Department drew criticism from Amnesty International and Asylum Access for deporting 1,086 Myanmar nationals despite an interim ruling by the Kuala Lumpur High Court suspending the removal of some 1,200 people.

The 1,086 Myanmar nationals were repatriated on three Myanmar Navy ships. This deportation came amidst human rights concerns following the 2021 Myanmar coup d'état.

== In popular culture ==
- Gerak Khas season 18 (2018) cooperation with Skop Production and Royal Malaysia Police which one of the episodes about operation against human trafficking and murder Immigration officer

== See also ==
- Malaysia Digital Arrival Card (MDAC)
- Star City F.C.
