= Malaysian nationality law =

Federal Constitution of Malaysia Articles 14 to 31

Federal Legislative Council
- Territorial extent: Malaysia
- Passed by: Federal Legislative Council
- Passed: 15 August 1957
- Commenced: 31 August 1957
- Status: Amended

Malaysian nationality law details the conditions by which a person is a citizen of Malaysia. The primary law governing nationality requirements is the Constitution of Malaysia, which came into force on 31 August 1957.

All persons born in Malaysia between 31 August 1957 and 1 October 1962 automatically received citizenship by birth regardless of the nationalities of their parents. Individuals born in the country since that date receive Malaysian citizenship at birth if at least one of their parents is a citizen. Foreign nationals may become Malaysian citizens by naturalisation after residing in the country for at least 10 years, renouncing any previous nationalities, and showing proficiency in the Malay language. Malaysia is composed of several former British colonies and protectorates acquired in the 18th and 19th centuries whose residents were British subjects and British protected persons. After the federation of its western states in 1948, the country became independent in 1957.

While Malaysian citizens no longer hold British nationality, they continue to hold favoured status when residing in the United Kingdom; as Commonwealth citizens, Malaysians are eligible to vote in UK elections and serve in public office there. However, restrictions in Malaysian law on exercising citizenship rights in a foreign country would result in the loss of Malaysian citizenship, effectively negating these entitlements. Holding another nationality while being a Malaysian citizen over the age of 21 is disallowed, and a Malaysian citizen risks losing their citizenship if they acquire another nationality.

== History ==
Britain first established a foothold on the Malay Peninsula with the settlement of Penang in 1786. Over the course of the 18th century, the British presence expanded throughout the region. British Malaya was broadly divided into three political groupings: the Straits Settlements, the Federated Malay States, and the Unfederated Malay States. The Straits Settlements were directly administered by the British government while the Malay states were areas ruled by local monarchs given limited autonomy in exchange for accepting British suzerainty. Residents of the Straits Settlements were British subjects, but subjects of the Malay state rulers were considered British protected persons instead.

Although Britain had jurisdiction in all three types of holdings, domestic law treated the Malay states as foreign territory. British protected persons were treated as aliens in the United Kingdom, but both Malay British subjects and protected persons could be issued British passports. Protected persons could not travel to the UK without first requesting permission, but were afforded the same consular protection as British subjects when travelling outside of the Empire. A person with connections both to directly governed portions of British Malaya and one of the Malay states could be a British subject and British protected person simultaneously.

Until 1867, the Straits Settlements were governed as part of British India. Legislation enacted in India prior to that year was applicable locally, including regulations on naturalisation. The Indian Naturalisation Act 1852 allowed foreigners residing in territory governed by the East India Company to naturalise as British subjects by application to the government. There was no minimum residence requirement and candidates simply needed approval from a relevant official. The oath of allegiance administered to successful applicants required them to swear loyal service to the company, as well as allegiance to the British monarch. After separation from India, the Legislative Council of the Straits Settlements passed the Naturalization Act, 1867 that contained virtually the same naturalisation requirements. Any person born in the Straits Settlements, the United Kingdom, or anywhere else within Crown dominions was a natural-born British subject.

Following the Second World War, colonial authorities merged the Malay states with Penang and Malacca to form the Malayan Union in 1946. A federal Malayan citizenship was created at its inception, although the union lasted only two years before reforming into the Federation of Malaya. Malayan citizenship existed simultaneously with the subject statuses of the individual Malay states and British nationality in the Straits Settlements. Federal, state, and British regulations for obtaining these statuses differed and this multilayered approach to citizenship continued until Malayan independence in 1957.

=== Penang and Malacca ===
Several early independence acts did not contain any provision for the loss of citizenship of the United Kingdom and Colonies by citizens of the newly independent states. A notable case is that of the former Settlements (colonies) of Penang and Malacca in what is now Malaysia. These were combined in 1948 with the nine Malay states (which were protected states rather than colonies) to form the Federation of Malaya. On independence on 31 August 1957, British protected persons (BPP) from the Malay states lost their BPP status. However, as a result of representations made by the Straits Chinese, known as the "Queen's Chinese", it was agreed by the Governments of the United Kingdom and Malaya that no provision should be made for the withdrawal of Citizen of the United Kingdom and Colonies (CUKC) status from the inhabitants of Penang and Malacca, who would consequently be allowed to remain CUKCs as well as citizens of Malaya.

On 16 September 1963, the colonies of North Borneo, Sarawak and Singapore were joined with Malaya to form Malaysia (Singapore subsequently left Malaysia in 1965). CUKC was withdrawn from those acquiring Malaysian citizenship in 1963, but this did not affect existing citizens of the Federation.

Hence, persons connected with Penang and Malacca prior to 31 August 1957, together with those born before 1983 in legitimate descent to fathers so connected, form the largest group of British Overseas citizens (estimated at over 1 million). Most also hold Malaysian citizenship.

== Acquisition and loss of citizenship ==
=== Entitlement by birth or descent (Citizenship by operation of law) ===
All persons born in Malaysia between 31 August 1957 and 30 September 1962 automatically received citizenship by birth regardless of the nationalities of their parents. Individuals born in the country on and after 1 October 1962 receive Malaysian citizenship at birth if at least one parent is a citizen and both parents are legally married to each other at the time of birth.

Prior to an amendment to the Constitution in 2024, children born in wedlock overseas are eligible to become Malaysian citizens by descent only if the father is a citizen. The birth of eligible persons must be registered at a Malaysian diplomatic mission within one year after birth for citizenship to be granted. Individuals born overseas to a Malaysian mother and a foreign father can only apply for citizenship by registration under Article 15(2), Article 15A, or by naturalisation, which is subjected to government approval and does not guarantee successful application.

The amendment now allows for either parent to be Malaysian for the child to be given citizenship automatically, but they are given a time limit of one year to register themselves. The amendment is not retrospective however and does not apply to those born before its passing. It also requires those obtaining citizenship this way to take an oath of citizenship when they turn 18.

Persons born to unmarried parents by default inherit their mother's citizenship. A child of a Malaysian father and non-citizen mother who are not married or whose marriage is not recognised in Malaysian law cannot acquire citizenship by descent. However, they may apply for citizenship by registration subject to the government's discretionary approval.

=== Voluntary acquisition (Citizenship by registration or naturalisation) ===
Foreign women who marry Malaysian men may also register as citizens after living in the country for at least two years with the intention of permanently settling in Malaysia. All other foreigners (including non-citizen husbands of Malaysian women) may become Malaysian citizens by naturalisation after residing in the country for at least 10 years, 12 months of which must be continuous residence immediately preceding their applications. Applicants must demonstrate proficiency in the Malay language and intend to reside in the country permanently. Anyone acquiring Malaysian citizenship through naturalisation or registration must renounce any previous nationalities.

Approvals for naturalisation and registration are given at the government's discretion. Applications are frequently rejected with no stated reasons and no process exists to appeal these decisions. Out of 4,029 citizenship applications between 2000 and 2009, only 1,806 were successful.

=== Relinquishment and deprivation ===
Malaysian citizenship can be relinquished by making a declaration of renunciation, while any Malaysian citizen who voluntarily acquire a foreign nationality will automatically have their citizenship revoked. For naturalised citizens, if they reside overseas for more than five years and have not annually registered at a Malaysian diplomatic mission to retain citizenship (other than those employed in the civil service), their citizenship may be deprived by the government. Naturalised citizens may also be stripped of citizenship for: committing an act of disloyalty against the state, aiding an enemy nation with which Malaysia is at war, being sentenced to incarceration for longer than 12 months in any jurisdiction, serving in any capacity for a foreign government, or being fined RM5,000 for any offence within five years of acquiring citizenship.

While holding multiple nationalities by birth is not technically prohibited by Malaysian law, a person who exercises any rights derived from those alternative statuses would be stripped of their Malaysian citizenship. This includes voting in elections or applying for passports in any jurisdiction outside Malaysia. Children who were registered as Malaysian citizens may also be deprived of their citizenship if a parent voluntarily renounces or is stripped of their citizenship.

However, under Article 23(2), citizens are not allowed to renounce their citizenship during times of war, unless they acquire the approval of the Federal Government of Malaysia.

== Constitution (Amendment) Bill 2024 ==
=== Children born overseas to Malaysian mothers ===
Prior to the amendment, Malaysia is one of 25 countries that does not give mothers and fathers equal rights under the country's citizenship law. Children born outside Malaysia to a Malaysian mother and a foreign national father are not entitled to automatic citizenship as citizen by operation of law under Article 14 and Part II of the Second Schedule of the Federal Constitution of Malaysia, while children born overseas to a Malaysian father enjoy automatic citizenship under the same aforesaid provisions.

A landmark ruling by the Kuala Lumpur High Court on 9 September 2021 ruled that Malaysian mothers to pass their citizenship to their children born overseas – a privilege previously only granted to fathers. The judge ruled that the word "father" in the Federal Constitution shall also be interpreted to include the meaning of "mother", and be read harmoniously with Article 8 of the Constitution, which guarantee equality before the law and prohibit discrimination based on gender. The change would help ease access to residency, education and healthcare for families. It was hailed by activists as a giant step toward gender equality.

However, on 5 August 2022, the KL High Court's ruling was overturned by the Court of Appeal in a 2–1 majority decision after successful appeal by the government. The two judges who are in the majority ruled that the word "father" in the Second Schedule of Part II of the Federal Constitution meant the biological father and cannot be extended to include the mother or parents. The two judges also stated that it was up to Parliament, not the court, to rewrite the Constitution.

On 17 February 2023, the Anwar Ibrahim Cabinet confirmed that it would amend the Malaysian Constitution to enable children born overseas to Malaysian mothers, who are married to foreigners, to obtain Malaysian citizenship automatically. Legislations was originally expected to be tabled in March 2023. However, it was not until one year later on 25 March 2024, that the constitutional amendment was finally tabled for its first reading in the Dewan Rakyat by the Minister of Home Affairs, Saifuddin Nasution Ismail.

Despite this, the plaintiffs, which consist of Association of Family Support and Welfare Selangor and Kuala Lumpur (Family Frontiers) and six Malaysian women, have pressed on with their appeal to the apex court of the country, the Federal Court. The Federal Court has initially fixed 25 June 2024 as the date of hearing of the appeal, but the hearing was then deferred to 5 September 2024 on the grounds of allowing the government to have time to complete the constitutional amendment process on the citizenship in the Parliament, as the potential amendments will have impact on the ongoing appeals once passed. The Federal Court did not hear the case on 5 September, as it was further deferred to 25 October, and then deferred again to 10 December.

As for the constitutional amendment bill tabled in Dewan Rakyat back on 25 March 2024, it was originally supposed to be tabled for a second reading by 27 March, the last day of the Dewan Rakyat meeting at the time. However, the bill was not put forward for debate and was postponed to the next Dewan Rakyat meeting, which began on 14 October 2024,. It was unanimously passed on 17 October 2024, allowing overseas born children who are born with at least one Malaysian parent to granted citizenship, as long as they register themselves within a year of being born and take a citizenship oath when they turn 18.

However the act was not retroactive and does not apply to those born before the bill. As of 8 June 2025 it has been gazetted as Act 1752 but it has yet to be enforced.

== Repealed provisions ==
Provisions mentioned below are pathways to citizenship that were once contained in the Federal Constitution, but have been repealed and are no longer in effect.

=== Citizenship by military service ===
Under Article 20 of the Federal Constitution, anyone who has served satisfactorily in the armed forces of Malaysia for at least 3 years in full-time service, or at least 4 years in part-time service, and intends to reside permanently in Peninsular Malaysia, can make a naturalisation application to the government to become a citizen of Malaysia. The naturalisation application can be made while the applicant is still in service of the armed forces, or within 5 years after he is discharged. If a person has served both in full-time and part-time service, then any of his two months of part-time service will be treated as one month of full-time service.

Article 20 and citizenship by military service in Malaysia has repealed by Constitution (Amendment) Act 1962 [Act 14/1962], with effect from 1 February 1964.

== Sabah and Sarawak ==
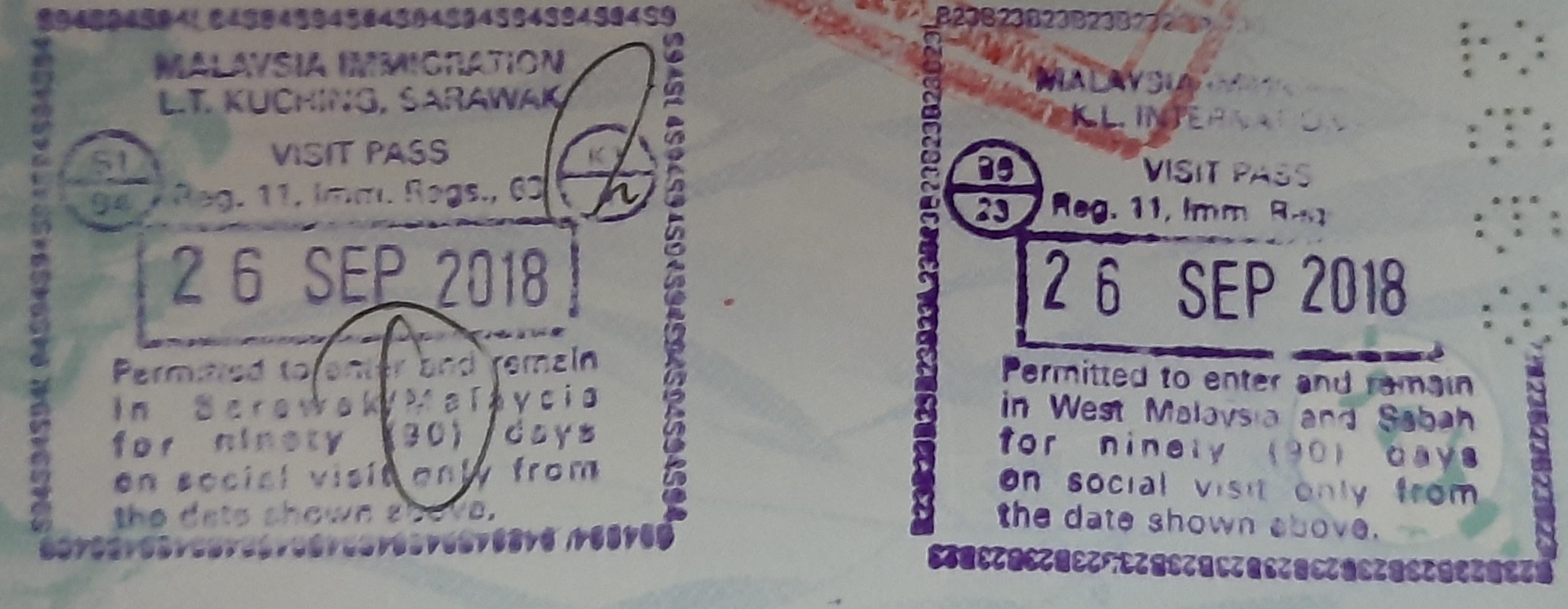
Because Sabah and Sarawak have autonomy over immigration affairs, visitors to these states receive separate entry stamps

Permanent residency in the states of Sabah and Sarawak are distinct from the other 11 Malaysian states. While Sabah and Sarawak each has autonomy in immigration affairs (which includes imposing immigration restrictions on Peninsular Malaysia residents), permanent residents of Sabah and Sarawak are exempted from the immigration controls of their own states. A Malaysian citizen born to a Sabah or Sarawak permanent resident would have Sabah or Sarawak permanent residency, regardless of where the person was born. Birth in Sabah or Sarawak alone does not make a person a permanent resident unless one of their parents is a permanent resident. A person may become a Sabah or Sarawak permanent resident by obtaining Permanent Residence (PR) status issued by the respective state immigration departments. The permanent residency status of a person is indicated by a letter on their MyKad below the photo, with H for Sabahans, K for Sarawakians, and none for Peninsular Malaysians. A similar scheme is also used in Malaysian passports, differentiated by the letter prefix of the passport number: H for Sabahans, K for Sarawakians, and A for Peninsular Malaysians.
