= IDFC Project Equity =

Finance company

IDFC Project Equity Company Limited
- Type: Limited liability company
- Industry: Private Equity
- Founded: 2008
- Headquarters: Mumbai, India
- Products: Investments, private equity funds
- Parent: Infrastructure Development Finance Company
- Website: www.idfcprojectequity.com

IDFC Project Equity is a finance company based in India and subsidiary of Infrastructure Development Finance Company Limited (IDFC).

IDFC Project Equity manages the India Infrastructure Fund (IIF), a SEBI-registered domestic venture capital fund focused on infrastructure with a corpus of INR 35 billion (US$875 million). IIF focuses on investing equity for the long-term in a diversified portfolio of infrastructure assets in India.

== History ==
IDFC Project Equity Company Limited is a wholly owned subsidiary of IDFC. It was set up as part of the 'India Infrastructure Financing Initiative', a collaboration between the Government of India and financial institutions to deploy US$5 billion in capital for infrastructure projects in India.
