= Capital Dynamics =

icapital.biz Berhad
- Type: Public limited company
- Traded as: MYX: 5108
- ISIN: MYL5108FO003
- Headquarters: 16th Floor, Plaza First Nationwide, No. 161, Jalan Tun H.S. Lee, 50000 Kuala Lumpur, Malaysia
- Website: www.icapital.my www.capitaldynamics.biz funds.icapital.biz www.icapital.biz

icapital.biz Berhad (MYX: 5108) is a Malaysia's only closed-end listed fund, listed on the Main Board of Bursa Malaysia. The fund is managed by Capital Dynamics Asset Management Sdn Bhd and advised by Capital Dynamics Sdn. Bhd.

Capital Dynamics is an independent fund management and investment advisory firm. With locations in Sydney, Singapore, Kuala Lumpur, Shanghai and Hong Kong, Capital Dynamics is Asia’s first global investment house.

== Locations and funds ==
- Capital Dynamics (Australia) Ltd., a global fund manager primarily managing the i Capital International Value Fund, a zero-load, global equity managed investment scheme, licensed in Australia by the Australian Securities and Investments Commission and provides individually managed accounts for wholesale investors.
- Capital Dynamics (S) Pte. Ltd, a global fund manager; primarily managing the i Capital Global Fund, an open-end, zero-load global fund and provides individually managed funds for accredited investors.
- Capital Dynamics Asset Management Sdn. Bhd. (CDAM), a Malaysia focused fund manager; primarily managing icapital.biz Berhad, Malaysia’s only listed closed-end fund and provides individually managed accounts for investors. CDAM is licensed by Securities Commission Malaysia
- Capital Dynamics Sdn. Bhd. (CDSB), an investment adviser publishing i Capital, a weekly investment report, in English and Mandarin since 1989 and its investment website www.icapital.biz. CDSB is licensed by Securities Commission Malaysia
- Capital Dynamics Asset Management (HK) Pte. Ltd.

== Founder ==
Capital Dynamics Sdn. Bhd. was founded in 1989 by Tan Teng Boo, who is also the managing director. Tan is also the founder of Malaysia’s only closed-end listed fund, iCapital.biz.
