= List of airports in North Korea =

This is a list of airports in North Korea. North Korea is a country in East Asia, which may have as many as 78 usable airfields, although the state's secrecy makes it difficult to ascertain their number and condition with certainty.

The state carrier, Air Koryo, joined the International Air Transport Association (IATA) in the late 1990s, and North Korea has proclaimed a program to upgrade several airports to international standards. However, with the exception of Pyongyang Sunan International Airport and a few that receive irregular service by Air Koryo, commercial aviation in North Korea is practically non-existent and most airfields appear to be military use.

== Hard surface airports ==
=== Public airports ===
Airport name	City	ICAO code	IATA code	Type
Pyongyang International Airport	Pyongyang	ZKPY	FNJ	International
Kalma Airport	Wonsan	ZKWS	WOS	Domestic
Samjiyŏn Airport	Samjiyon	ZKSE	YJS	Domestic
Orang Airport	Chongjin	ZKHM	RGO	Domestic
Sondok Airport	Hamhung	ZKSD	DSO	Domestic
Uiju Airport	Sinuiju	ZKUJ	UJU	Domestic

=== Military airports ===
Airport name	City	Based aircraft
Changjin Up Airport	Changjin	
Hwangju Airport		44 MiG-19
Hwangsuwon Airport		44 MiG-21
Hyon Ni Airport	Hoeyang	
Iwon Airport		38 MiG-21
Kaechon Airport	Kaechon	
Kalma Airport		72 MiG-19
Kang Da Ri Airport	Wonsan	
Kangdong Airport	Kangdong	
Koksan Airport		24 MiG-21
Kuum-Ni Airport	Tongchon	
Kwail Airport		44 MiG-21
Kwaksan Airport		24 Il-28
Kyongsong-Chuul Airport	Kyongsong	
Mirim Airport	Mirim-dong	
Onchon Airport	Onchon	
Orang Airport		44 MiG-19
Panghyon Airport	Kusong	
Pukch'ang Airport		36 SU-25 and 24 MiG-29
Sonchon Airport	Sonchon	46 MiG-23
Sondok Airport		24 Il-28
Sungam Ni Airport	Chongjin	
Taechon Airport	Taechon	
T'aet'an-pihaengjang Airport	Taetan	
Toksan Airport	Hamhung	24 Il-28
Yonpo Airfield		An-2s

== Non-hard surface airports ==
- Chik-Tong Airport
- Ch'o do Airport
- Haeju Airport
- Hoeyang Southeast Airport
- Hyesan Airport
- Ichon Airport
- Ichon Northeast Airport
- Ihyon Airport
- Kuktong Airport
- Kumgang Airport
- Maengsan Airport
- Manpo Airport
- Ongjin Airport
- Paegam Airport
- Pyongsul Li Airport
- Sinuiju Airport
- Sohung South Airport
- Taebuko Ri Airport
- Taechon Northwest Airport
- Tanchon South Airport
- Toha Ri North Airport
- Unchon Up Airport

== Highway strips ==
These airfields are little more than widened sections of highway that appear to be for emergency or backup use only and may not normally support operations. They are listed as "Highway(활주로)" or "Highway Strip".

- Ayang Ni
- Changyon
- Chasan
- Kang Da Ri
- Kilchu
- Kojo
- Koksan South
- Koksan South 2
- Nuchon Ni(누천리비행장활주로)
- Okpyong Ni
- Panghyon South
- Panghyon South 2
- Pyong Ni South(평리남방비상활주로)
- Sangwon
- Sangwon Ni
- Seanchan
- Singye
- Sinhung
- Sunan-Up
- Wong Yo Ri
- Yong Hung

== Other ==
- Pyongyang Heliport Facility, with apparent ICAO code ZKKK, is listed at 39°02′57.00″N 125°48′19.00″E.

== See also ==
- Transportation in North Korea
- Korean People's Air Force#Air bases
- List of airports by ICAO code: Z#ZK - North Korea
- Wikipedia: WikiProject Aviation/Airline destination lists: Asia#Korea, Democratic People's Republic of (North)
