= United States Air Force in South Korea =

Bases of the United States Air Force in South Korea
- Part of Pacific Air Forces Seventh Air Force
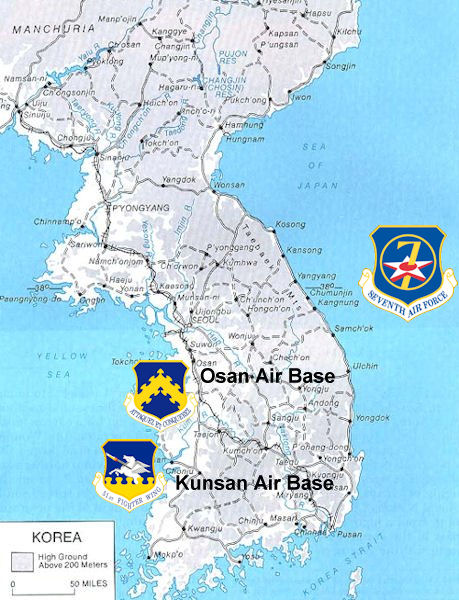
- Location of USAF bases in South Korea
Date	1950 – present
Location	South Korea
Result	Cessation of hostilities (Armistice) 1953. No peace treaty.

The United States Air Force in South Korea is composed of units assigned to Pacific Air Forces Seventh Air Force. The mission of the personnel, equipment and aircraft is to deter, protect and defend the Republic of Korea from attack from the Democratic People's Republic of Korea (DPRK) or more commonly known as North Korea.

The mission of Seventh Air Force is to plan, direct, and conduct combined air operations in the Republic of Korea and in the Northwest Pacific in support of PACAF, the United States Pacific Command, United Nations Command, US-ROK Combined Forces Command, and U.S. Forces Korea. The Seventh Air Force is composed of the 8th and 51st Fighter Wings.

== After the Second World War ==
The first United States Army Air Forces formation assigned to Korea was the 308th Bombardment Wing, assigned to the Far East Air Forces. The wing and its assigned 475th Fighter Group was ordered to Seoul on 22 September 1945 as part of the United States Army Military Government in Korea to de-militarize the Japanese forces in the Korean peninsula. In addition, the wing was to evacuate Allied prisoners of war and civilian internees; to maintain air supremacy in the occupation area; to provide air protection for Allied naval forces, provide Air/Sea rescue for waters off the Korean peninsula; obtain photographic reconnaissance for the United States Army XXIV Corps in Korea, and perform special operations for ground and naval forces. Also the 308th Bomb Wing established and operated radar facilities. The wing was reassigned to Kimpo on 7 January 1946, and remained in Korea until March 1947 when it was reassigned to Nagoya, Japan.

On 25 June 1950, North Korea invaded South Korea. On 27 June 1950, United Nations Security Council Resolution 83 recommended that UN member states assist the government of South Korea in resisting the invasion. United States President Harry Truman authorized General Douglas MacArthur (commander of the US occupying forces in Japan) to commit units to the battle. MacArthur ordered Lt. General George E. Stratemeyer, Commander in Chief of Far East Air Force (FEAF) based in Japan to attack invading North Korean forces between the front lines and the 38th parallel.

That day, two Japan-based USAF F-82 Twin Mustangs destroyed three North Korean Air Force planes over Seoul as a C-54 Skymaster was attempting to evacuate U.S. civilians, including many women and children, from the advancing North Korean Army in the opening days of the Korean War.

== Korean War ==
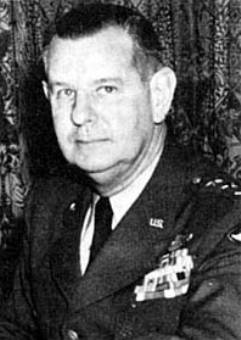
Lt. Gen. George E. Stratemeyer. Commander in Chief of Far East Air Force during the Korean War.

For information concerning aircraft flown by FEAF in the Korean War; bases, and units engaged in combat operations.

South Korea fell within the USAF Far East Air Forces area of responsibility. FEAF's Fifth Air Force was the main United Nations combat air command. Logistics and transport units were assigned to Far East Air Forces Combat Cargo Command, and on 8 July a special FEAF Bomber Command was set up under the command of Major General Emmett O'Donnell, Jr.

=== Initial USAF Response ===
Initial FEAF missions were the transportation of Army and Marine units and equipment from Japan to South Korea, the evacuation of American civilian nationals, and obtaining significant intelligence through aerial reconnaissance of North Korean troop movements south. Fighter-bomber ground attack missions by Japan-based F-80Cs significantly slowed the North Korean Army's advance during July 1950. On 13 July, the FEAF Bomber Command took over command of the 19th Bombardment Group and of the 22nd and 92nd Bombardment Groups which had been transferred from Strategic Air Command (SAC) bases in the United States to Japan. These B-29 Superfortress units were used in tactical attacks which were not very successful.

Despite repeated air attacks by UN aircraft on the advancing North Korean troops, by early September the UN armies had been squeezed down into a small area south of the Naktong River, called the "Pusan Perimeter", and there was a very real fear that the hard-pressed UN troops might be forced to evacuate the entire Korean peninsula. In late July, MacArthur agreed to divert the B-29s to interdiction raids against North Korean targets nearer the 38th parallel in an attempt to interrupt supplies being delivered to North Korean troops in the south.

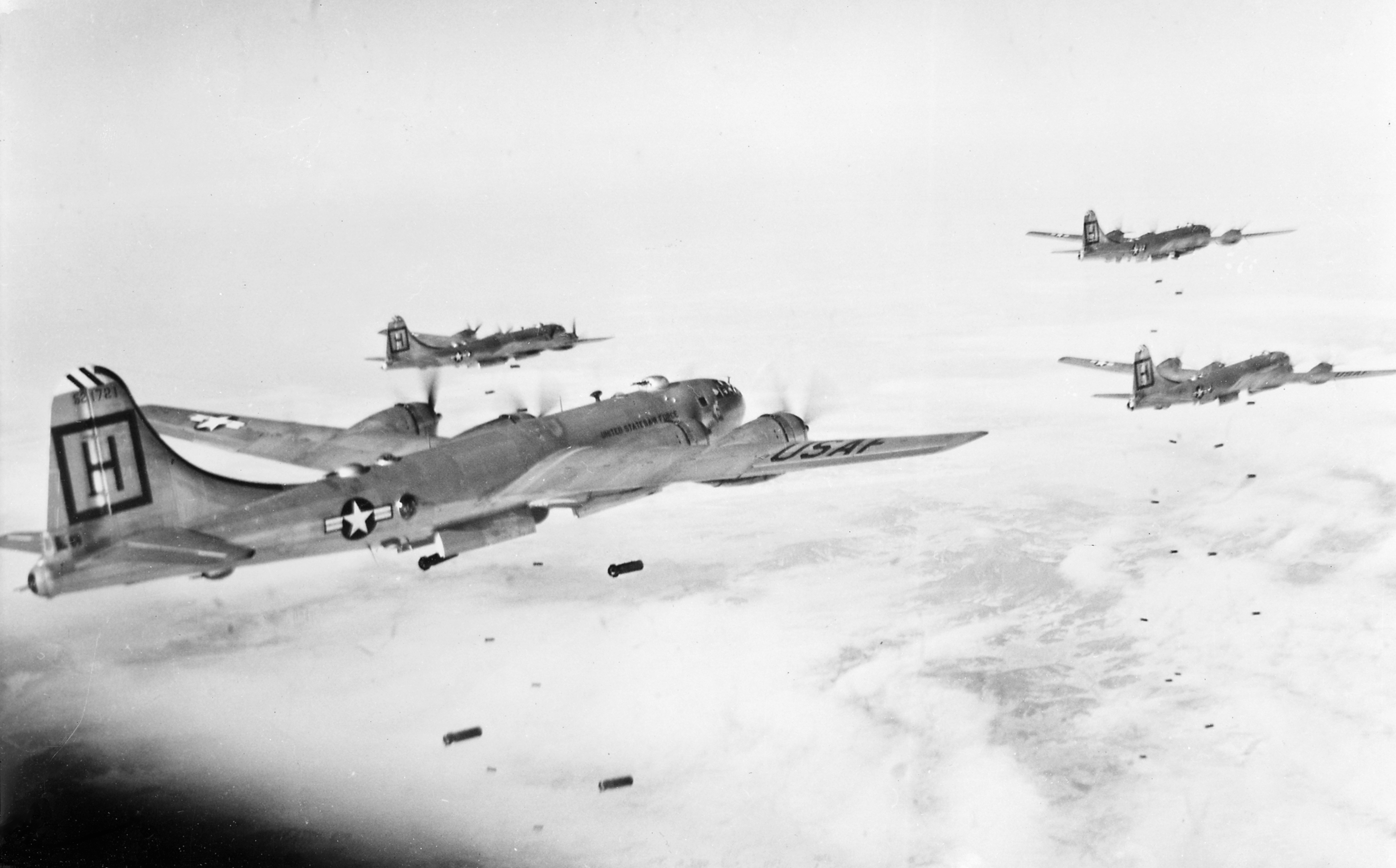
Formation of B-29s over the daytime skies of North Korea 1951.

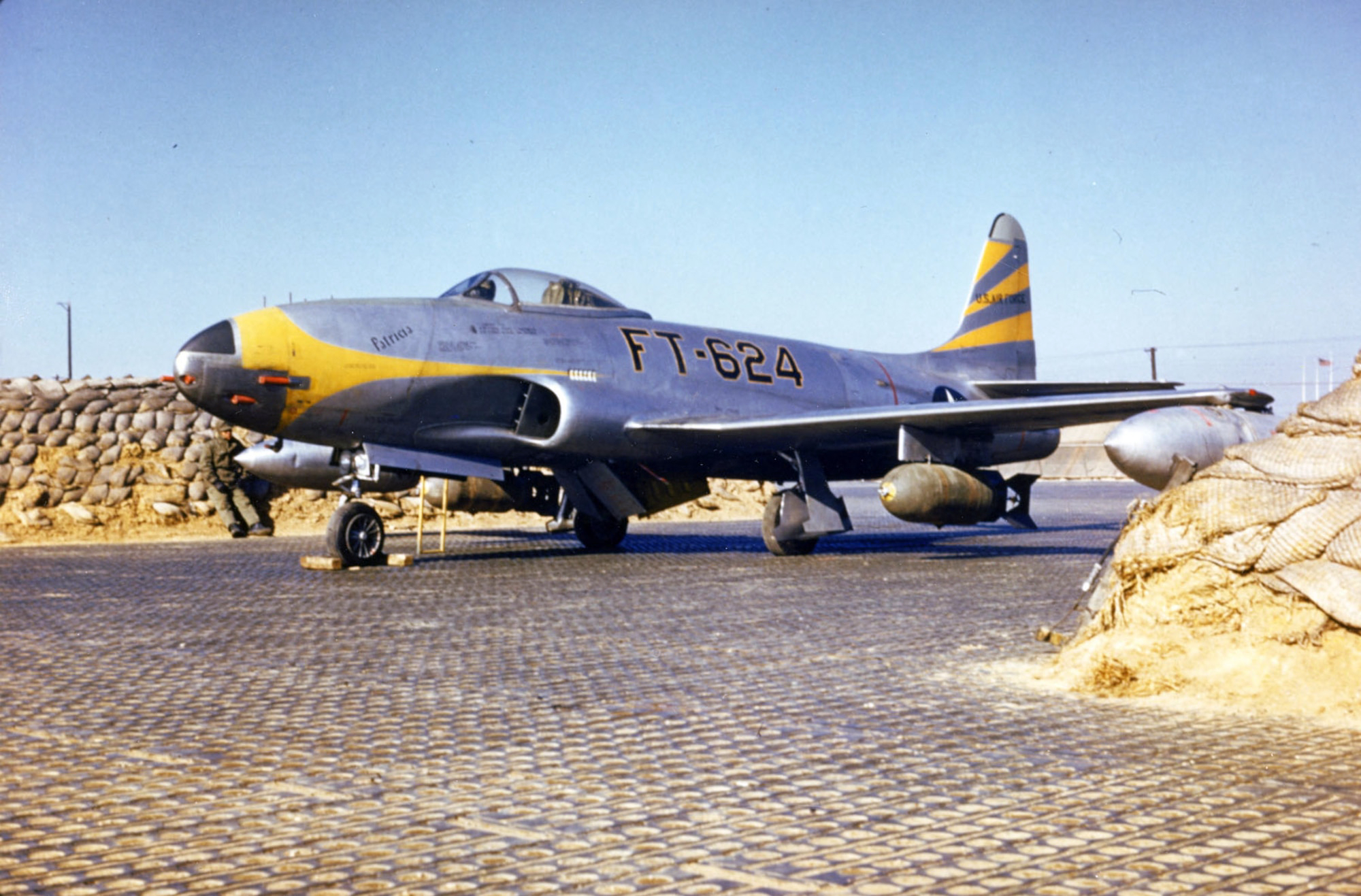
Lockheed F-80C-10-LO Shooting Star s/n 49–624 of the 8th Fighter-Bomber Group, 80th FBS, Korea, 1950

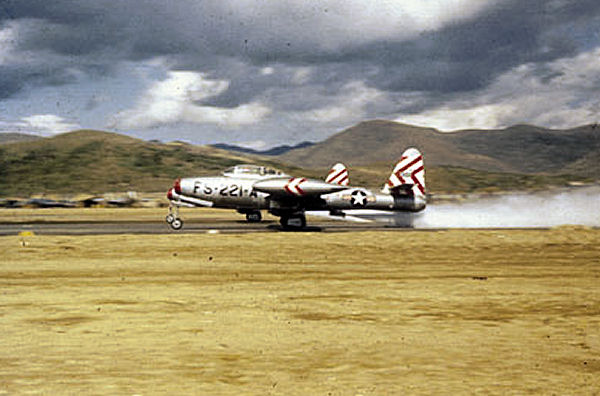
49th FBW Republic F-84E-25-RE Thunderjets taking off in Korea. s/n 51–221 in foreground.

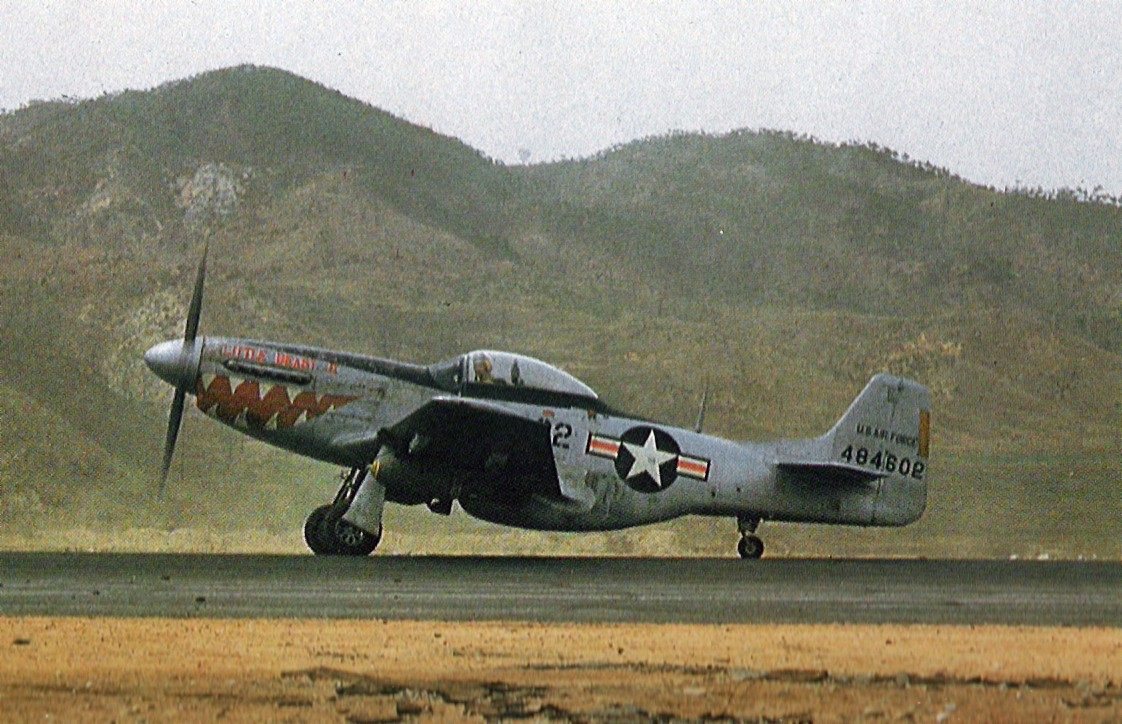
A 12th FBS North American F-51D-25-NA Mustang s/n 44-84602 in Korea

Later in July, the SAC 98th and 307th Bombardment Groups were also sent to Japan to join the FEAF. The 31st Strategic Reconnaissance Group completed the team. The 92nd and 98th BGs and the 31st SRG operated from bases in Japan, whereas the 19th, 22nd, and 307th BGs were based in Okinawa. Five major industrial centers in North Korea were earmarked for attack. This sort of mission is what the B-29 had been designed for, and by early September, all known industrial facilities in North Korea had been destroyed except for some oil storage facilities at Rashin, which was considered too close to the Soviet border to risk an attack. By late September, all 18 strategic targets in North Korea had been destroyed, and the B-29 Force now turned to secondary targets.

Along with the SAC B-29 units, Tactical Air Command (TAC) deployed numerous fighter, fighter-bomber, tactical bomber, transport and support units to FEAF. TAC Lockheed F-80C Shooting Star and Republic F-84E Thunderjets units deployed to FEAF to rapidly gain control of the air from the Korean People's Armed Forces Air Corps. For a time in August and September 1950, all FEAF flying units had to fly from bases in Japan. The only continuously usable tactical base in Korea was Taegu (K-2), which the FEAF used as a staging field to refuel and arm tactical aircraft.

North Korea was equipped with an assortment of Russian-built equipment such as the Yakovlev Yak-9 and Lavochkin La-11 fighters, the Ilyushin Il-10 ground attack aircraft and a smattering of Yak-18 and Polikarpov Po-2 trainers. Having largely eliminated North Korean aircraft from the skies, FEAF now turned to the task of ground attack in trying to halt the rapid North Korean advance. By September, the North Korean aircraft had largely been swept from the sky.

By August 1950, in order to build up close support forces, 145 North American F-51 Mustangs were shipped from the United States aboard the aircraft carrier USS Boxer (CV-21). These planes were quickly assembled and flown out to combat units. The 18th Fighter-Bomber Wing gave up its F-80 Shooting Star jets for Mustangs, perhaps one of the few occasions in history in which a combat outfit traded in its jets for piston-engined aircraft. The Mustangs were instrumental in halting the North Korean advance, giving United Nations forces enough time to build up sufficient strength to be able to go over onto the offensive.

With both American strategic and tactical air power arriving in force, F-80 Shooting Stars and F-51 Mustangs closed most rail and road traffic by day, and destroyed 32 critical bridges necessary for the conduct of warfare. Trains used by military and civilians alike waited out the daylight hours in tunnels.

Throughout all parts of Korea, B-29 Superfortresses knocked out the main supply dumps and eliminated oil refineries and seaports that handled imports. The bombing was designed to starve North Korean forces of ammunition and other martial supplies. On 16 September as part of a strategic bombing campaign, the FEAF bombed Pyongyang, the capital of North Korea, and Wonsan, an east coast port 80 miles north of the 38th parallel. Naval air power also attacked transportation choke points. The North Korean forces were already strung out over the peninsula, and the destruction caused by American bombers prevented needed supplies from reaching North Korean forces in the south.

With control of the air obtained, General MacArthur's invasion of Inchon on 15 September 1950 suddenly reversed the fortunes of the UN forces in Korea. In the south, the Eighth U.S. Army, made up of U.S., ROK, and British forces, counterattacked the next day and United Nations forces in the Pusan Perimeter began to push north rapidly.

U.S. Marines attached to X Corps captured Kimpo Air Base near Seoul on 17 September. Two days later the first FEAF cargo carrier landed there, inaugurating an around-the-clock airlift of supplies, fuel, and troops. C-54 Skymasters returned wounded personnel to hospitals in Japan, and C-119s airdropped supplies to front-line forces. Bad weather hindered close air support of the Eighth Army, but on the 26th the U.S. 1st Cavalry Division forged out of the Pusan Perimeter north of Taegu and within a day thrust northward to link up with 7th Infantry Division forces near Osan, 25 miles south of Seoul. Air controllers, using tactics similar to those developed in France during World War II, accompanied the advancing tank columns, supported tank commanders with aerial reconnaissance, and called in close air support missions as needed. On 26 September, General Douglas MacArthur announced the recapture of Seoul, but street fighting continued for several more days.

As US forces swept North Korean troops from South Korea, aviation engineers rebuilt the airfields, beginning with Pohang, on the east coast 50 miles northeast of Taegu. USAF flying units returned on 7 October to Pohang and to other rebuilt airfields at Kimpo, near Seoul, and at Suwon, 20 miles south of Seoul. By the end of the month North Korean forces had been driven entirely out of South Korea.

==== United Nations Offensive 1950 ====
For the United Nations forces, victory was in the air by early October 1950. The Inchon landing and the breakout from the Pusan Perimeter had destroyed the North Korean units operating south of the 38th Parallel. With the return of Seoul to the South Korean government, the Republic of Korea regained the status it had enjoyed before the 25 June invasion. To stop at this juncture would have been consistent with America's policy of containment.

With the North Korean forces largely removed from the South, the United Nations decided to enforce its prewar intention of reuniting all of Korea under one government, and UN forces advanced across the 38th parallel and into North Korea in early October 1950. However, the decision to cross the 38th Parallel appears, in retrospect, to have been the turning point in the Korean War.

On 1 October Chinese Premier Zhou Enlai warned that China would not tolerate or stand aside if UN forces invaded North Korea. This was a clear threat that China would intervene if that should happen. On the second the Soviet delegate to the United Nations proposed that a ceasefire in Korea be called and that all foreign troops be withdrawn. On 2 October, India warned the United Nations that China told them it would enter the war if U.N. forces cross the 38th Parallel. However, despite these warnings from China, The U.S. Army X Corps made amphibious landings at Wonsan and Iwon, which had already been captured by South Korean forces advancing by land.

Many in the West, including General MacArthur, thought that taking the war into Northern China would be necessary since North Korean troops were being supplied by bases in Manchuria. MacArthur believed that Chinese supply depots near Mukden (now Shenyang) in southern Manchuria and railroad lines leading across the Yalu River into North Korea should be bombed by USAF B-29s. However, President Truman and his senior advisers disagreed, ordering MacArthur to be very cautious when his ground forces approached the Manchurian border along the Yalu.

The UN offensive greatly concerned the Chinese, who worried that the UN forces would not stop at the Yalu River, the border between North Korea and the People's Republic of China, and might extend their rollback policy into China. By the end of October, UN forces were up near the Chinese frontier and some forward units were actually on the southern banks of the Yalu River. On 1 November 1950, a group of F-51s and B-26s were attacking Sinuiju airfield (just across the Yalu from China) when they encountered six swept-wing jets coming across the Yalu at them, firing as they approached. The Mustangs were able to escape the attack and return to base to report that the Soviet MiG-15 had appeared in Korea.

==== Chinese Intervention 1950 ====
When the Soviet-built Mikoyan-Gurevich MiG-15 (MiG-15) first appeared over the skies of Korea, its performance was vastly superior to every United Nations aircraft then in use in the theater. The MiG-15 was equal to the F-86A. It was a better dogfighter, with an edge in maneuverability and excellent acceleration. Its top speed, however, was slightly less than that of the F-86.

In order to counter the MiG threat, on 8 November the 4th Fighter Interceptor Wing (which consisted of the 334th 335th, and 336th Squadrons) based at Wilmington, Delaware and equipped with the F-86A Sabre was ordered to Korea. However, before any of these Sabres could reach the front, on 26 November 1950, Chinese armies intervened with devastating force in Korea, breaking through the United Nations lines and throwing them back in utter confusion.

The Chinese struck in the west, along the Chongchon River, and completely overran several South Korean divisions and successfully landed a heavy blow to the flank of the remaining UN forces. The ensuing defeat of the U.S. Eighth Army resulted in the longest retreat of any American military unit in history. In the east, at the Battle of Chosin Reservoir, a 30,000-man unit from the U.S. 7th Infantry Division and U.S. Marine Corps was also unprepared for the Chinese tactics and was soon surrounded, though they eventually managed to escape the encirclement, after inflicting heavy casualties on six Chinese divisions.

However, the MiG-15s did not provide any effective air support for this invasion, being unable to establish any effective intervention below a narrow strip up near the Yalu. The MiG pilots were relatively inexperienced and were poor marksmen. They would seldom risk more than one pass at their targets before they would dart back north across the Yalu. Had the MiGs been able to establish and hold air superiority over the battle area, the UN forces may well have been thrown entirely out of Korea.

The first advanced detachment of 336th FIS F-86As arrived at Kimpo airfield (K-14) west of Seoul on 15 December. The first Sabre mission took place on 17 December. It was an armed reconnaissance of the region just south of the Yalu. Lt. Col. Bruce H. Hinton, commander of the 336th Squadron, succeeding in shooting down one MiG-15 out of a flight of four, to score first blood for the Sabre.

By the end of 1950, Chinese armies had driven UN forces out of North Korea and had begun to invade the South. The Sabres were forced to evacuate Kimpo and return to Japan which put them out of range of the action up at the Yalu. Even though the Yalu was now out of range, on 14 January, an F-86A detachment appeared at Taegu (K-37) to participate as fighter bombers to try to halt the Chinese advance. The F-86A was not very successful in the fighter-bomber role, being judged much less effective than slower types such as the F-80 and the F-84.

Eventually, the Chinese advance ground to a halt due to extended supply lines and the relentless UN air attacks. The Chinese advance was halted by the end of January, and the UN ground forces began pushing them back. Kimpo airfield was recovered on 10 February. The halting of the Chinese advance can be blamed largely on the inability of the MiGs to provide any effective support for the Chinese attack. Not only had no Chinese bombers appeared to attack UN troops, but no MiGs had flown south of the Yalu region to provide any air support.

==== MiG-15s versus B-29s ====
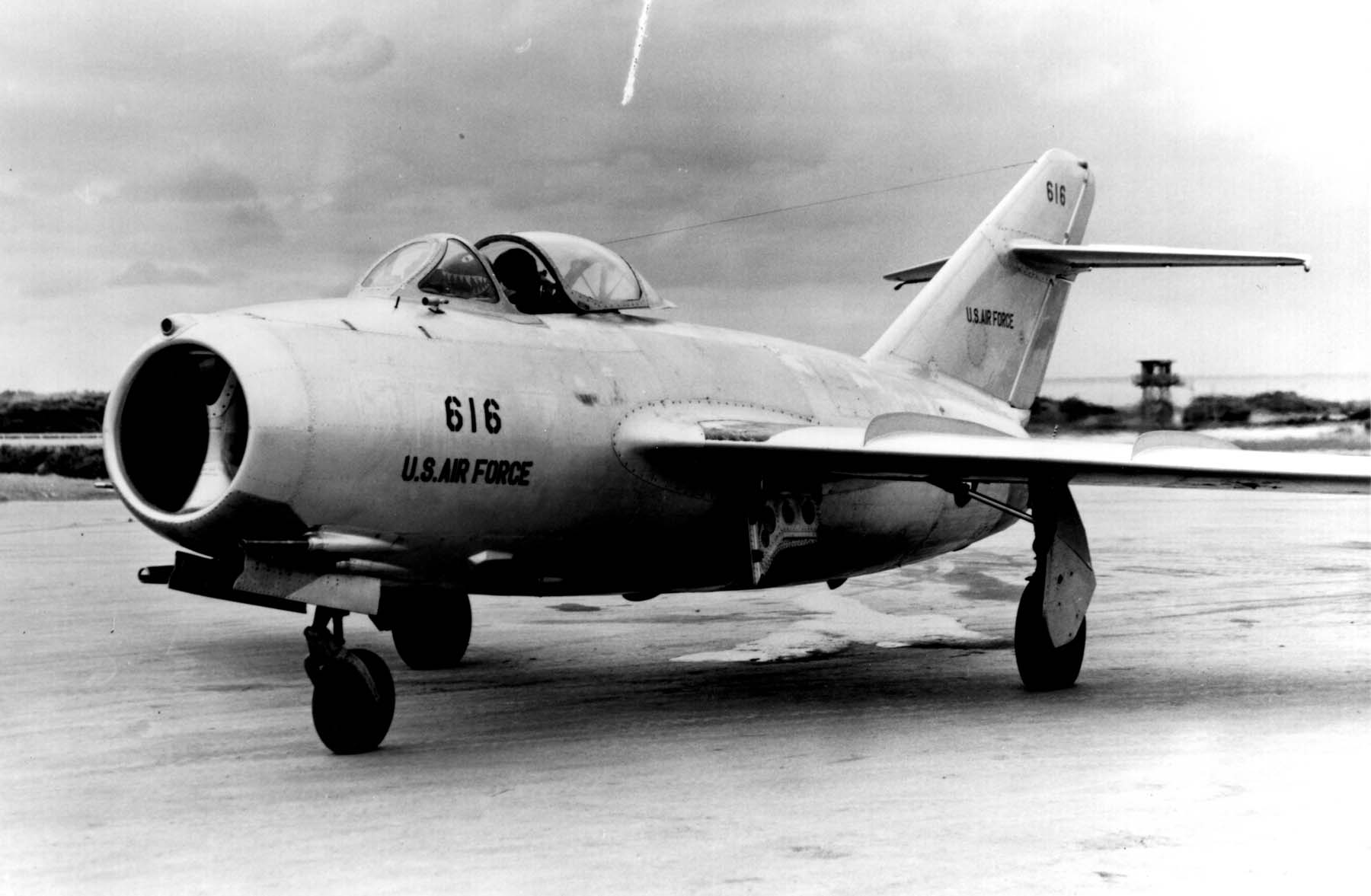
MiG-15 delivered by a defecting North Korean pilot to the US Air Force

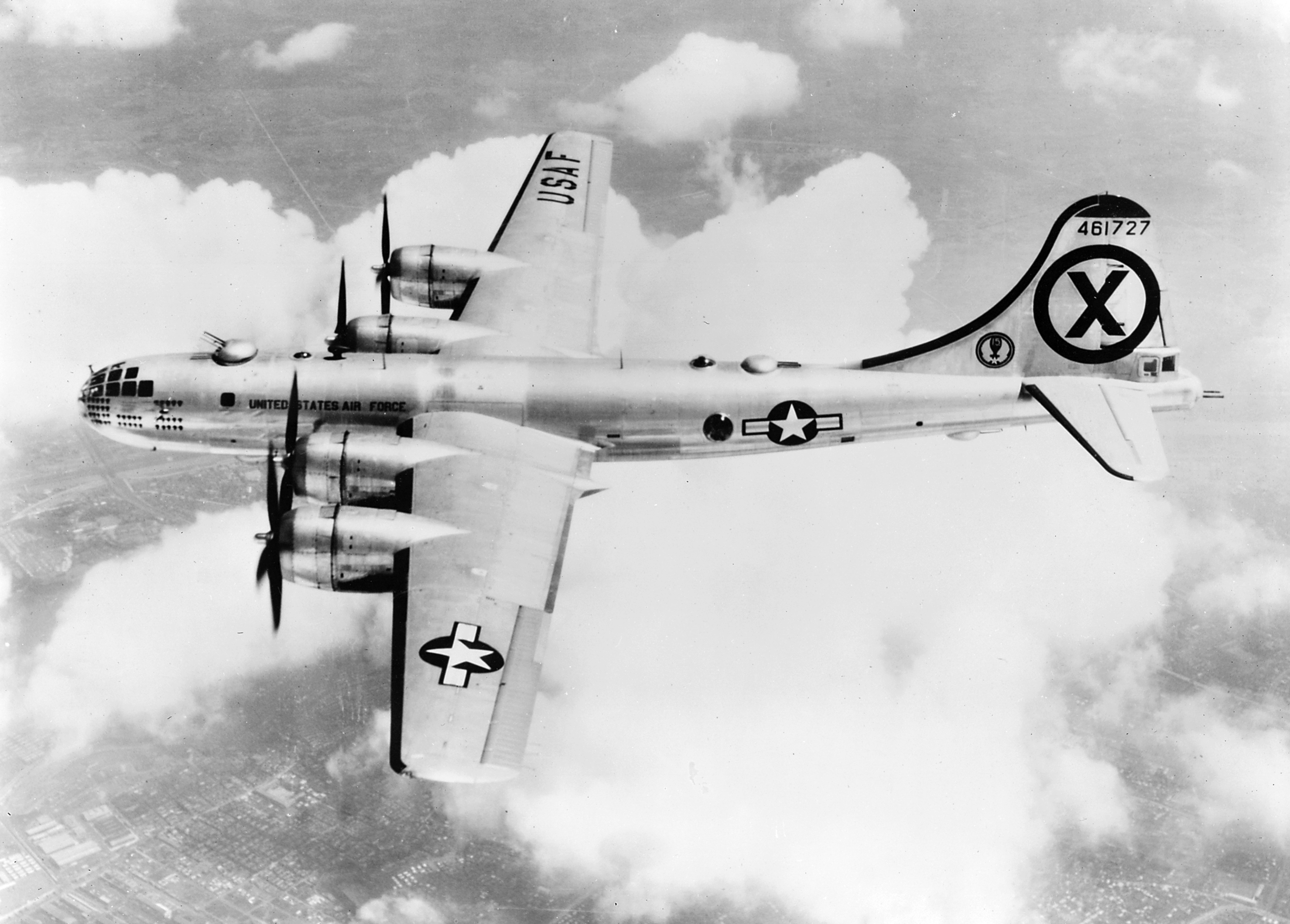
Boeing B-29A-45-BN Superfortress 44-16727. Converted to F-13A. (RB-29A, 91st SRS) shot down by MiGs, possibly over China or extreme northern N Korea 4 July 1952. 11 of 13 taken POW.

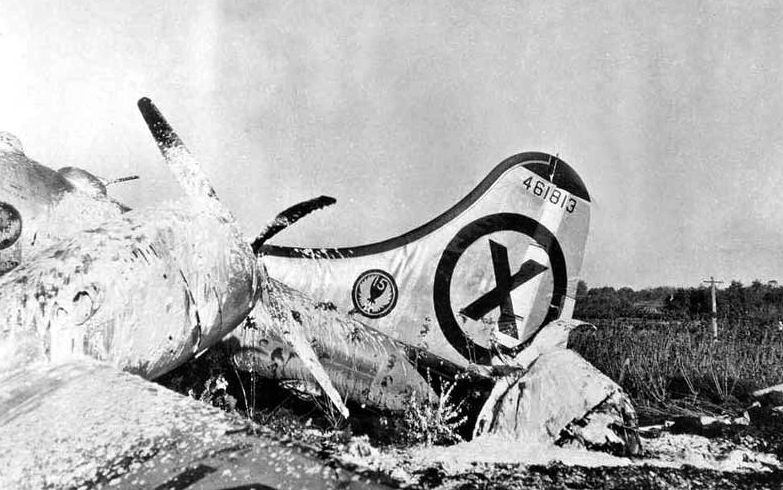
Remains of Boeing B-29A-50-BN photo reconnaissance aircraft. The aircraft had been attacked by MiG 15s. It fought off its attackers and claimed a MiG, but lost both left wing engines. Making it back to Japan, the left wing stalled on approach and the aircraft crashed at Johnson AB in Japan 9 November 1950.

In February 1951, a series of B-29 interdiction raids began against Chinese supply lines in northwest Korea. Up to early 1951, in the absence of organized defenses, B-29s had been able to make bombing runs at altitudes as low as 10,000 feet without any danger. On 25 February, four B-29s on a raid against Sunchon were attacked by eight MiG-15s. The MiG-15 was originally intended to intercept American bombers like the B-29. It was even evaluated in mock air-to-air combat trials with an interned ex-U.S. B-29, as well as the later Soviet B-29 copy, the Tupolev Tu-4. To ensure the destruction of such large bombers, the MiG-15 carried cannon armament: two 23 mm with 80 rounds per gun and a single 37 mm with 40.

With the appearance of the MiG-15 in the skies over North Korea, unescorted raids at low altitudes now became extremely dangerous. Consequently, the missions were now flown at 20,000 feet, defensive formations were used, and fighter escort was provided by F-80C and F-84E aircraft. These fighters were ineffective against the MiG-15, and coordination between the bombers and fighters was often poor.

On 1 March, a Superfortress formation was jumped by nine MiGs and on 12 April, a force of 48 B-29s attacking the railroad bridge linking Korea with Antung, Manchuria were attacked by dozens of MiGs, and three B-29s were shot down and seven were damaged. Because of these losses, General Stratemeyer called off these raids on 12 April and diverted the B-29s to close-support raids against Chinese targets further south around the 38th parallel.

In October 1951, USAF planners decided to concentrate on the destruction of Chinese air power in northern Korea before trying a more vigorous bombing policy. The B-29s were to launch attacks on Chinese air bases in north Korea. They were acting as bait, hoping to lure MiG-15s into battle, where they could be destroyed by F-86 fighters. However, the MiG squadrons had been widely dispersed, making it difficult for USAF intelligence to find them, and B-29 losses were heavy. By 27 October, five B-29s had been lost and 20 more heavily damaged.

MiG-15s could come in much higher than the B-29 escorts could fly, and dive directly into the bomber formation ripping them apart with blistering cannon fire. B-29 gunners had only a split second to fire on a diving Mig, and many times only put a few holes in it.

These raids were suspended and replaced by night attacks using B-29s equipped with navigation radar. This radar was able to pinpoint small targets with great accuracy. The 98th Wing was the first to be equipped, followed by the 19th and 307th. The first nighttime raids began in November 1952, and continued throughout the remainder of the Korean War. However, night fighters and radar-controlled defenses did cause significant losses. On 10 June 1952, four B-29s of the 19th Bomb Group were lit up by 24 searchlights. They were instantly attacked by 12 Migs which shot down two and severely damaged a third causing it to crash. The B-29 for all practical purposes had become a sitting duck. Between 18 November 1952, and 30 January 1953, communist night-fighters shot down five B-29s and severely damaged three more using a combination of radar-directed searchlights.

When the Korean War ended, the B-29s had flown over 21,000 sorties, nearly 167,000 tons of bombs had been dropped, and 34 B-29s had been lost in combat (16 to fighters, four to flak, and fourteen to other causes). B-29 gunners had accounted for 34 Communist fighters (16 of these being MiG-15s) probably destroyed another 17 (all MiG-15s) and damaged 11 (all MiG-15s).

With the appearance of the MiG-15 over the skies of Korea, the B-29, as well as all of the propeller-driven bombers in the USAF inventory, were simply rendered obsolete as strategic offensive weapons. It would take a new generation of swept-wing jet bombers, being able to fly higher and faster to effectively defeat the defense of the MiG-15 or subsequent Soviet-designed interceptors.

==== F-86s clear the skies ====
The Chinese apparently did have plans for a major spring 1951 offensive to complete the task of driving the UN out of Korea. This plan was to be based on the construction of a series of North Korean air bases and for Chinese MiGs to use these bases as forward landing strips to provide air superiority over the North, preventing UN aircraft from interfering with the advance.

In early March, the MiGs began to become more active in support of this offensive, On 1 March 1951, MiGs attacked a formation of nine B-29s and severely damaged three of them. Fortunately, by this time the UN base at Suwon (K-13) was now ready, and the Sabres were now able to return to Korea and reenter the fray over the Yalu. The Sabres of the 334th Squadron began their first Yalu patrols on 6 March, and the rest of the squadron moved in four days later. At the same time, the 336th Squadron moved to Taegu (K-2) from Japan, so that they could stage Sabres through Suwon. The 4th Fighter Wing's other squadron, the 335th, stayed in Japan until 1 May.

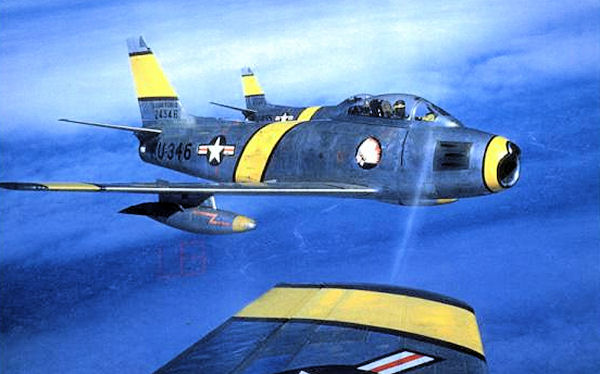
North American F-86F-30-NA Sabres of the 4th FIW/335th FIS "Chiefs" over Korea. Serial 52-4346 identifiable.

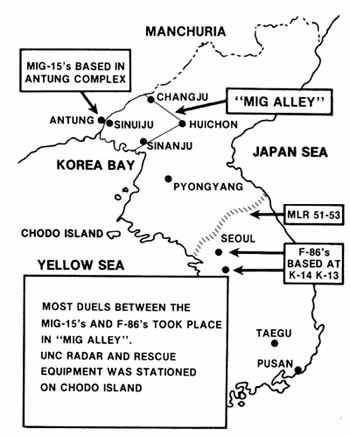
Aerial Combat in Korea

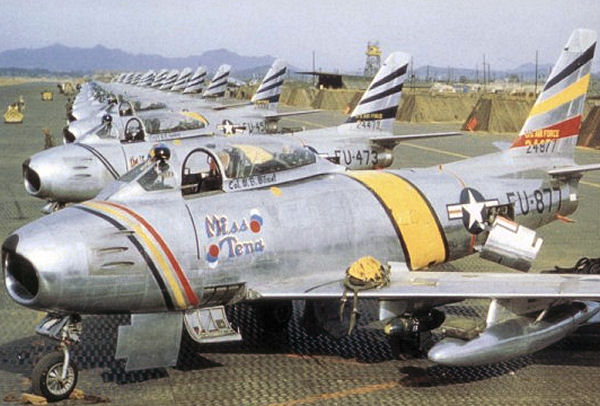
North American F-86F-30-NA Sabres of the 8th Fighter-Bomber Group, Korea, 1953. Serial 52-4877 in front in Wing Commander's colors, 52-4473 alongside.

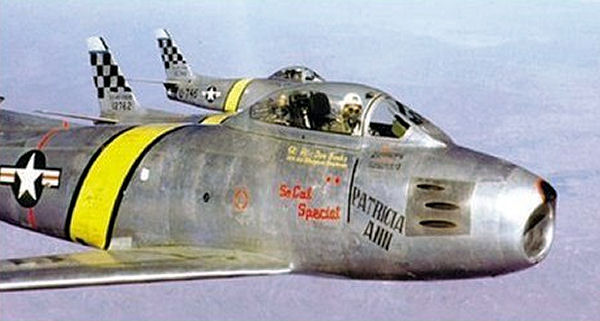
North American F-86E-10-NA Sabres of the 25th Fighter-Interceptor Squadron (51st) FBG over Korea. Identifiable is serial is 51–2742.

The biggest air battle of that spring took place on 12 April when a formation of 39 B-29s escorted by F-84Es and F-86As were attacked by over 70 MiGs. Three B-29s were lost, whereas 14 MiGs were claimed destroyed, four by the escorting Sabres and ten by B-29 gunners.

The strip of airspace in western Korea just south of the Yalu River soon became known as "MiG Alley" to the Sabre pilots. The Sabres would arrive for their 25-minute patrols in five-minute intervals. The MiGs would usually cruise back and forth at high altitude on the other side of the Yalu, looking for an opportune time to intervene. Very often they would remain on the north side of the river, tantalizingly out of reach. When the MiGs did choose to enter battle, the Sabres would usually have only a fleeting chance to fire at the enemy before the MiGs broke off and escaped back across the Yalu. No F-86As were lost in action during the first five months of 1951, and they flew 3550 sorties and scored 22 victories. Most of the attrition was caused by accidents rather than by losses in actual combat.

In June 1951, the MiGs began to show more aggressive behavior, and their pilots began to get somewhat better. In air battles on 17, 18 and 19 June, six MiGs were destroyed but two Sabres were lost. Another Sabre was lost on 11 June when the 4th Wing covering an F-80 attack on the Sinuiju airfield shot down two more MiGs. As the first year of the Korean War came to an end, it was apparent that the F-86A Sabre had been instrumental in frustrating the MiG-15's bid for air superiority. Without control of the air, the Communist Chinese were unable to establish their series of air bases and they were not able to carry out effective air support of their spring offensive, and the Korean War settled down to a stalemate on the ground. The ground battle line was roughly the 38th Parallel where United Nations forces controlled most South Korean territory, and the Chinese and North Koreans controlled most North Korean territory, with some exceptions. It would remain that way for the rest of the war.

Throughout the summer and early fall of 1951, the Sabres of the 4th FIW continued to seek battle with the MiGs near the Yalu. For the next year and a half, the duel continued. New, improved models of the F-86 appeared with the F-86E entering action in Korea with the 4th Wing in July 1951, replacing that unit's F-86As on a one-by-one basis.

At any one time, only about 60 Sabres could be put into the air, assuming that everything was "right", with the rest of the force remaining at Kimpo or Suwon on alert or down for maintenance. Even when at maximum levels, the Sabre force was far outnumbered by the MiGs. By late 1951, there were enough MiGs available so that the Chinese forces attempted to move a couple of MiG squadrons into the base at Uiju Airfield, North Korea. UN air attacks soon made this base untenable, forcing the MiGs back across the Yalu.

It is now known that there were Soviet Air Force (VVS) fighter squadrons which participated in the air combat along the Yalu. They were rotated through the MiG bases on the northern side of the Yalu. Soviet Air Force MiGs operated from bases at Antung, Fengcheng, Tak Tung Kao, Takushan, Juantien, and others. At Mukden in Manchuria there were large numbers of MiGs waiting to replace those lost in battle or rotating home. Some Eastern Bloc units also participated. In addition, Soviet Units carried out extensive training of Chinese and North Korean pilots. Soviet archives that have only recently come to light officially list 345 Soviet-piloted MiG-15s having been lost to UN aircraft of all types during the Korean War. There are no comparable figures available for Chinese or North Korean losses. By the early spring of 1953, most of the Soviet units had been withdrawn from combat, and most of the MiGs were now being flown by Chinese or North Korean pilots.

On 22 October 1951 seventy-five new F-86Es were ordered shipped to Japan to replace the F-80Cs of the 51st Wing based at Suwon. The 51st Wing (consisting of the 16th and 25 FIS) began operations with its new F-86Es from Suwon on 1 December, with the famous World War II ace Col. Francis S. Gabreski as wing commander. The first kill for the 51st FIS was scored by Lt. Paul Roach of the 25th FIS on 2 December. Col. Gabreski had scored 31 kills over Europe in World War II, and he added 6.5 victories to his score in Korea.

In late 1951, the rules of engagement were modified, making it possible for UN pilots to cross the Yalu when in "hot pursuit" of an enemy. However, there were many unofficial violations of this rule, and there were some occasions in which bombing and strafing attacks were carried out by UN aircraft on Communist facilities north of the Yalu, and F-86s did on occasions went north of the Yalu looking for MiGs. There were even some MiG kills scored on the "wrong" side of the Yalu. The Manchurian sanctuary was lifted in the second week of April 1952.

The first F-86Fs reached Korea in June and July 1952, and they were issued to the 51st Wing's new 39th Squadron. F-86Fs were provided to the 335th Squadron of the 4th Wing in September 1952. The arrival of the F-86F quickly boosted Sabre victories in Korea. The 4th Wing's 335th Squadron scored a total of 81 victories during the remainder of 1952, while the other two 4th Wing squadrons (which were still operating F-86Es) got 41.

A wing modification to the Sabre, called the "6–3" gave the F-86F increased maximum speed. In addition, there was a slight improvement in range. The most significant improvement was, however, in the maneuverability at high altitudes and at high Mach numbers. Sabre-wing modification conversion kits were shipped to Korea in high secrecy in September 1952 to convert F-86F aircraft already there to the new configuration. Enough kits were eventually supplied to convert all Korean-based F-86Fs and some F-86Es to this new configuration. The "6–3" wing was an immediate success, quickly boosting Sabre victories in Korea. With the "6-3-wing" F-86F, the USAF now had a fighter which could match the maximum speed of the MiG at altitudes all the way up to the Sabre's service ceiling of 47,000 feet, could turn inside the MiG, and which had almost as great a rate of climb. It was with F-86F with the "6–3" wing that the Sabre was to rack up its biggest score during the Korean War. Between 8 May 1953 and 31 May 1953, F-86Fs with 6–3 wings accounted for 56 MiG kills vs only one lost, one of the most one-sided air battles ever fought

The arrival of the "6–3" winged Sabre in Korea was soon to be followed by the fighter-bomber Sabre. The first F-86F-30-NA fighter-bombers arrived in Korea on 28 January 1953, and they equipped the 18th Fighter Bomber Wing based at Osan. This Wing flew its first Yalu patrol on 25 February, and scored its first MiG kill on the same day.

By the end of hostilities, F-86 pilots were credited with shooting down 792 MiGs for a loss of only 78 Sabres, a victory ratio of 10 to 1. Postwar totals officially credited by the USAF are 379 kills for 103 Sabres lost, amounting to a ratio of nearly 4 to 1. Modern research by Dorr, Lake and Thompson has claimed the actual ratio is closer to 2 to 1.

==== 1953 Armistice ====
Negotiations for an armistice had been going on for nearly eighteen months. It was thought that if a series of military targets could be located and then destroyed, the Communist side could be persuaded to agree to an armistice. The first of these raids took place on 11 July 1952 against 30 different targets in Pyongyang. Similar strikes took place against Sungho-Ri, Chosin, Sindok, and Sinuiju. The nighttime bombing techniques of the B-29 crews improved, and on 30 September 1952 45 B-29s wiped out the chemical plant at Namsan-Ri.

By late spring of 1953, the emphasis was again on Chinese airfields and bridges in the north. The objective was to keep these fields unserviceable since tentative truce terms had allowed for a 12-hour free period between the signing of the truce agreement and the time it became effective, which could have given the Communist side enough time to move in massive numbers of aircraft to the ten major North Korean airfields.

The Korean War ended on 27 July 1953, with the Korean Armistice Agreement in which the country remained divided into two. The last Sabre/MiG fight of the Korean War took place on 22 July 1953, when Lt. Sam P. Young of the 31st Wing scored his first and only victory. The last kill of the Korean War took place on 27 July, when Capt. Ralph S. Parr flying an F-86F-30 shot down an Il-12 twin-engined transport aircraft. At the end of the Korean War, the seven American fighter Wings in Korea had 297 Sabres on hand, with 132 of them being with fighter-bomber Wings.

From June 1950 to July 1953 the FEAF lost a total of 1,406 aircraft and suffered 1,144 airmen killed.

==== Korean War Campaigns ====
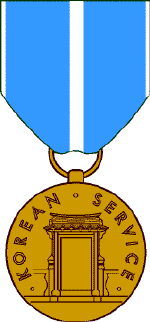
Korea Defense Service Medal. Awarded for Military service during Korean War (1950–1953).

There were ten designated campaigns for Korean War Service.

- UN Defensive Campaign: 27 June – 15 September 1950
- UN Offensive Campaign: 16 September – 2 November 1950
- Chinese Communist Forces (CCF) Intervention Campaign: 3 November 1950 – 24 January 1951
- 1st UN Counteroffensive Campaign: 25 January – 21 April 1951
- CCF Spring Offensive Campaign: 22 April – 8 July 1951
- UN Summer-Fall Offensive Campaign: 9 July – 27 November 1951
- Second Korean Winter Campaign: 28 November 1951 – 30 April 1952
- Korea, Summer-Fall 1952 Campaign: May l-30 November 1952
- Third Korean Winter Campaign: 1 December 1952 – 30 April 1953
- Korea, Summer 1953 Campaign: May l-27 July 1953

== Post Korean War ==
According to U.S. estimates, about one million South Koreans were killed or went missing during the war, 85% of them civilians. According to figures published in the Soviet Union, around 1.13 million people, or 11.1% of the total population, were killed in North Korea (with the total casualties of some 2.5 million). More than 80% of the industrial and public facilities and transportation infrastructure, three-quarters of all government buildings, and half of all housing was destroyed.

Both North and South Korea were devastated by the war, and the armistice has generally been adhered to by the North Koreans. As the Armistice took hold, the U.S. Air Force redeployed all but one tactical fighter wing from the peninsula, and in November 1954 Fifth Air Force was relieved from assignment for combat forces in South Korea. Fifth Air Force returned to Japan, where it was responsible for maintaining a strong tactical posture for the defense of Japan. The defense of South Korea became the responsibility of the 314th Air Division, which exercised that responsibility until 8 September 1986.

The 58th Fighter-Bomber Wing moved from Taegu AB to Osan-Ni AB in March 1955, and became the only permanently assigned tactical fighter wing on the peninsula. On 18 September 1956, the base was redesignated Osan AB—its current name. In July 1958, the U.S. Air Force inactivated the 58th FBW. At this time, the Eisenhower Administration promulgated a nuclear deterrence strategy. Osan AB thus became the main base of operations for air-to-ground Matador tactical missiles. Fifth Air Force also complemented this strategy by making rotational deployments of fighter aircraft units to Osan and Kunsan ABs from elsewhere to bolster Korean defenses as it steadily trained and equipped the ROK Air Force. Until the late 1960s the USAF in South Korea remained relatively dormant, hosting temporary deployments of flying units and serving as a safe haven base for aircraft evacuated from Okinawa and Guam during typhoons.

In Asia, tensions in the Taiwan Straits in 1954 and 1958 threatened to erupt into open warfare between the United States and the People's Republic of China, and the Cold War between the United States and Soviet Union shifted from to Berlin in the early 1960s.

=== 1968 Pueblo Seizure ===
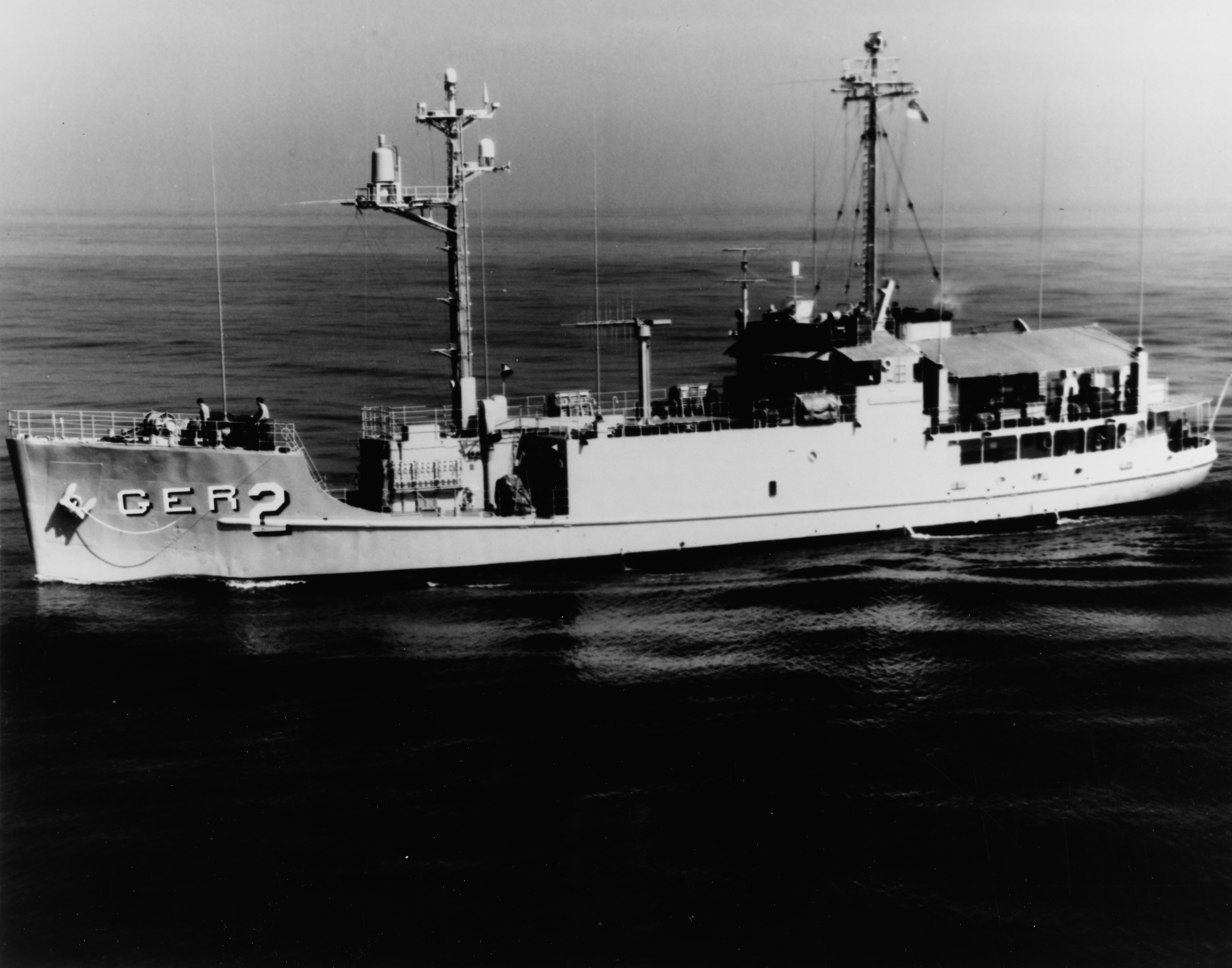
USS Pueblo (AGER-2)

On 23 January 1968 the electronic intelligence gathering ship USS Pueblo (AGER-2) was boarded and captured by the North Koreans. The ship and its crew were taken to the port at Wonsan and the crew was taken hostage.

North Korea stated that the Pueblo strayed into their territorial waters, but the United States maintains that the vessel was in international waters at the time of the incident. More recently, facts have come to light that indicate that ship was captured by North Korea at the instigation of the Soviet Union, which was seeking a cryptographic machine on board to match with a key provided to the Soviets by the spy John Walker.

In response to the Pueblo seizure, the USAF deployed three augmented squadrons of the 4th Tactical Fighter Wing in January 1968 through July 1968 and then from the 354th Tactical Fighter Wing, flying the F-100 Super Sabre to Kunsan Air Base in July 1968, as part of the buildup of forces in Korea in the wake of the seizure. The 558th Tactical Fighter Squadron was removed from Vietnam and reassigned to Kunsan Airbase and later to Taegu Airbase. 558th weapons crews were tasked with loading nuclear weapons on their aircraft and remained on alert. Wayne Wartenberg Weapons Mechanic 558th Tactical Fighter Squadron 1967–1968 Vietnam The 354th was equipped with two activated Air National Guard squadrons, and the wing consisted primarily of ANG and Air Force Reservists from other units, the bulk of USAF active duty airpower in the Pacific being committed to South Vietnam or Thailand at the time. On 10 June 1968, the ANG squadrons returned to the United States after the men of the Pueblo were released.

=== 1969 Navy EC-121 Shootdown ===
On 15 April 1969, a Navy EC-121 reconnaissance aircraft was shot down by North Koreans about 90 miles southeast of the North Korean port of Chongjin. U.S. radar tracked two North Korean MiGs before the aircraft was shot down. They attempted to warn the aircraft, but the MiGs caught up with the slow-flying aircraft. All of its 31 crew members were killed. The bodies of only two crew members were recovered. Error was blamed on a North Korean ground-to-air controller's command and control error to the pilot.

As a result of these incidents with the North Koreans, and the resulting heightened tensions in the Korean peninsula, on 23 April the 421st Tactical Fighter Squadron was activated at Kunsan Air Base and attached to the 354th TFW. F-4Es from Eglin AFB were deployed to Kunsan and assigned to the 421st, with support personnel from the 4th TFS – deployed from Eglin to Da Nang Air Base South Vietnam were sent TDY to Kunsan to support the 421st.

At the end of tensions on 26 June 1969, the 421 TFS was inactivated at Kunsan, with the aircraft being sent to Da Nang as replacements along with the TDY personnel.

On 14 June 1970, the 354 TFW at Kunsan was inactivated with the new 54th Tactical Fighter Wing being activated in place. The 16th and 478th TFSs were transferred and attached to the 54th.

==== Post Vietnam era ====
On 15 March 1971, the 3rd Tactical Fighter Wing was activated at Kunsan AB. At Osan Air Base, PACAF activated the 51st Air Base Wing to assume host-unit responsibilities at Osan AB on 1 November 1971. Two weeks later, on 13 November, the 3rd TFW's 36th Tactical Fighter Squadron moved to Osan AB.

Total withdrawal of U.S. forces from Southeast Asia by 1976 resulted in another important change for Osan AB. On 30 September 1974, the 51st ABW was redesignated as the 51st Composite Wing (Tactical), and assigned the 36th TFS with its F-4D/E Phantoms and 19th Tactical Air Support Squadron with its OV-10A Broncos.

In September 1974 the 8th Tactical Fighter Wing moved from Ubon Royal Thai Air Force Base, Thailand to replace the 3rd at Kunsan. The move took place in name only, as the 8th moved without personnel or equipment, absorbing all assets of the 3rd Tactical Fighter Wing. This included the two flying squadrons, which continued to operate as the 35th and 80th Tactical Fighter Squadrons, reuniting the wing with two of its original squadrons.

=== Seventh Air Force ===
On 8 September 1986, Seventh Air Force activated at Osan AB, and assumed the mission of maintaining the armistice on the Korean peninsula previously performed by the 314th Air Division.

Activities by Seventh Air Force has been dictated largely by mission changes and enhancements, and the threat from North Korea. Introduction of the F-16 Falcon in 1988 led to construction of hardened aircraft shelters at Osan AB

As the ROK's military grew and matured into a formidable force by the late 1990s, political and military leaders from both countries reexamined the role of U.S. forces based on the peninsula. A major change in U.S. strategic policy coinciding with the September 11 terrorist attacks in New York and Washington DC. required a "transformation" of global U.S. military commitments and basing. The military had to adapt from a fixed, in-garrison-type force to a mobile, responsive force.

For its part, United States Forces Korea (USFK) studied how technological advances in weaponry could mitigate a reduction in personnel while the ROK military forces carried out an increasing role to protect its sovereignty. The result of this effort led to the landmark agreement known as the Land Partnership Plan in 2002 and the Security Policy Initiative in 2003 between the U.S. and the ROK governments. These decisions reflected a realignment in the roles and missions of USFK that forecast a significant reshaping and growth through 2011.

Since reaching this agreement, both as U.S. Air Forces Korea, under the joint USFK, and the USAF component to the United States and Republic of Korea Combined Forces Command's Air Component Command, Seventh AF has been an integral part of deterring aggression from North Korea.

Due to the ongoing threat of aggression from North Korea, USAF personnel assigned to South Korea are exempt from Expeditionary duty as part of the Global War on Terrorism.

== USAF Units assigned to South Korea since July 1953 ==
Command and Control

- 314th Air Division

Osan Ni (later, Osan) AB, Korea, 15 March 1955
Yong San, Korea, 7 November 1978
Osan AB, Korea, 1 April 1979 – 8 September 1986.
Activated at Nagoya AB, Japan, on 1 December 1950, the organization immediately assumed the missions of the air defense of Japan, logistical support for Fifth Air Force during the Korean War, and airfield construction in Japan. The division maintained assigned and attached forces at a high degree of combat readiness, March 1955 – September 1986. In fulfilling its mission, the division supported numerous military exercises in the region, such as Commando Bearcat, Commando Jade, and Commando Night.

- Seventh Air Force

Osan AB, Korea, 8 September 1986—present
Since 1986, has served as the Air Force component to the U.S. and South Korean combined air command with the mission of deterring North Korean aggression.

Wings

- 3d Tactical Fighter Wing

Kunsan AB 15 March 1971 – 16 September 1974

Host unit at Kunsan Air Base

- 4th Fighter-Interceptor Wing

4th Fighter-Bomber Wing
4th Fighter-Day Wing
Kimpo AB, 23 August 1951 – 1 October 1954
Chitose AB, Japan, c. 25 November 1954 – 8 December 1957
Kunsan AB, January–July 1968 (TDY)

Provided air defense for Japan, 1953–1957. In February 1955, shot down two of eight North Korean MIGs that attacked an escort mission. Attached to 354th TFW at Kunsan AB 1968 during the Pueblo crisis.

- 8th Fighter-Bomber Wing

8th Tactical Fighter Wing
8th Fighter Wing
Suwon AB, South Korea, 23 August 1951
Itazuke AB, Japan, 20 October 1954 – 10 July 1964

Deployed at Kunsan AB, South Korea, 14–22 October 1955

Kunsan AB, South Korea, 16 September 1974–.

Air defense in South Korea, July 1953 – October 1954. Air defense in Japan, and maintenance of a quick-reaction strike force, October 1954 – May 1964. On 16 September 1974 the wing moved without personnel or equipment to Kunsan AB, South Korea, where it absorbed the resources of the 3d TFW. The 8th became responsible for air defense of South Korea

- 18th Fighter-Bomber Wing

18th Tactical Fighter Wing
18th Wing
Osan-ni, South Korea, 26 December 1952;
Kadena AB, Okinawa (later, Japan), 1 November 1954—present

Deployed at Osan AB, South Korea, 28 January-c. 13 June 1968, following North Korean seizure of USS Pueblo. Maintained air defense alert capability in South Korea, 1978 – present

- 54th Tactical Fighter Wing

Kunsan AB, South Korea, 15 June-31 October 1970

In June 1970, as the 54th Tactical Fighter Wing, replaced the 354th TFW at Kunsan AB, South Korea. Used attached F-4 squadrons in the Republic of Korea

- 325th Fighter-Interceptor Wing

Deployed to Osan AB 9 February – 1 July 1968

Deployed a large detachment at Osan AB, South Korea, to provide air defense

- 347th Tactical Fighter Wing

Yokota AB, Japan, 15 January 1968 – 15 May 1971

Air defense in Japan and South Korea, plus aerial reconnaissance and contingency operations

- 51st Fighter-Interceptor Wing

51st Tactical Fighter Wing (Tactical)
51st Wing (Tactical)
51st Fighter Wing (Tactical)
Suwon AB, South Korea, 1 October 1951 – 26 July 1954
Naha AB, Okinawa, 1 August 1954 – 31 May 1971
Osan AB, South Korea, 1 November 1971– present

Following the seizure of the USS Pueblo by North Korea, deployed one squadron (82nd Fighter-Interceptor) and support personnel to Suwon AB, Korea, 30 January-20 February 1968, and sent other personnel to Osan AB, South Korea, to support the 314th Air Division. Deployed an interceptor detachment to Suwon AB, South Korea, from June 1968 through 1970. In November 1971, served primarily as a support wing for Osan AB and the Koon-Ni range complex, and, after 15 April 1975, for Taegu AB, South Korea. Added a tactical mission on 30 September 1974. The wing lost control of Taegu AB from October 1978 to January 1982. The wing in 1982 gained a close air support capability to complement its air superiority role. Frequently deployed aircraft and crews to participate in training exercises throughout the Far East during this period. In addition, aircrews trained to perform fast forward air control missions beginning in 1984. In 1988–1989, mission shifted to offensive counterair and all-weather air interdiction. Restored tactical air control capabilities in October 1990, and, in September 1991, became the first operational F-16 unit to employ laser targeting with the LANTIRN navigation and targeting system. Airlift support operations were augmented with the addition of a flight of light transports in August 1992. Took part in a series of joint and combined training exercises for the defense of the Republic of Korea.

- 354th Tactical Fighter Wing

Kunsan AB, 2 July 1968 – 14 June 1970

Deployed to Kunsan Air Base from Myrtle Beach AFB, South Carolina during Pueblo Crisis, replacing the 4th TFW. Manned primarily by ANG people on active duty under 4th TFW control. When the 4th TFW departed, the 354th assumed active F-100 operations. Its two ANG squadrons returned to the United States in June 1969, and for 10 days in South Korea the wing was again without tactical components. Several rotational squadrons provided needed tactical force after this brief lapse. On 14 June 1970, the 354th passed its resources to the 54th TFW and returned to the United States

- 475th Air Base Wing

Temporarily deployed to: Kunsan AB January 1968 – March 1971
Temporarily deployed to: Taegu AB, July 1968 – April 1970

Maintained forward operating locations at Kunsan and Taegu Air Bases and maintained squadrons or segments thereof at each location, with periodic rotation back to Misawa AB Japan. A major earthquake on 16 May 1968 caused over $1 million damage to Misawa facilities. Phased down at Misawa in early 1971 and inactivated on 1 March all resources moving to Kunsan AB, South Korea, for the 3d Tactical Fighter Wing.

Source for unit history:
