= Koksan =

Koksan may refer to:

- Koksan County, a county in North Hwanghae Province, North Korea
- Koksan Airport, an airport in Koksan County
- Koksan (artillery), a North Korean self-propelled gun
