= Samjiyon (disambiguation) =

Samjiyon is a North Korean city. It may also refer to:

- Samjiyon tablet computer
- Samjiyon Airport
- Samjiyon Line
