= List of airports in Korea =

List of airports in Korea may refer to:

- List of airports in North Korea
- List of airports in South Korea
