= Hoeyang Southeast Airport =

Airport in North Korea

- IATA: none; ICAO: none

Summary
- Airport type: Military
- Serves: Hoeyang, North Korea
- Elevation AMSL: 1,093 ft / 333 m
- Coordinates: 38°39′29.50″N 127°39′00.50″E
- Interactive map of Hoeyang Southeast Airport

Runways
Direction	Length		Surface
Direction	ft	m	Surface
15/33	3,650	1,113	Gravel

- Hoeyang Southeast Airport
- Hangul: 회양비행장
- Hanja: 淮陽飛行場
- RR: Hoeyang bihaengjang
- MR: Hoeyang pihaengjang

Hoeyang Airport (a.k.a. Hoeyang Southeast Airport) is an airport in Hoeyang, Kangwon-do, North Korea.

== Facilities ==
The airfield has a single gravel runway 15/33 measuring 3650 x 253 feet (1113 x 77 m). It is sited in a river valley approximately 18 km east-northeast of Hyon Ni Airport.
