= Pyongsul Li Airport =

- IATA: none; ICAO: none

Summary
- Airport type: Military
- Serves: Koksan, North Korea
- Elevation AMSL: 715 ft / 218 m
- Coordinates: 38°43′09.20″N 126°43′16.30″E
- Interactive map of Pyongsul Li Airport

Runways
Direction	Length		Surface
Direction	ft	m	Surface
15/33	2,900	884	Grass

- Pyongsul Li Airport
- Chosŏn'gŭl: 병술리비행장
- Hancha: 丙戌里飛行場
- Revised Romanization: Byeongsul-li bihaengjang
- McCune–Reischauer: Pyŏngsul-li pihaengjang

Pyongsul Li Airport is an airport near Tŏkhŭng-ni in Koksan, Hwanghae-bukto, North Korea. Pyŏngsul-li village was named after Tŏkhŭng-ni in 1982.

== Facilities ==
The airfield has a single grass runway 15/33 measuring 2900 x 141 feet (884 x 43 m). It approximately 11 km northeast of Koksan Airport.
