= Jangyeon Byeon clan =

- Country: Korea
- Current region: Changyon County
- Founder: Byeon Yu ryeong

Jangyeon Byeon clan (Korean: 장연 변씨; Hanja: 長淵 邊氏) was one of the Korean clans. Their Bon-gwan was in Changyon County, Hwanghae Province. According to the research in 2000, the number of Jangyeon Byeon clan was 1931. Their founder was Byeon Yu ryeong. He was a menxia Shilang (Hanja: 門下侍郎) in Song dynasty. He was a great grandchild of Byeon gyeong who was from Longxi Commandery, China and served as government official after he was naturalized in the Later Silla.

== See also ==
- Korean clan names of foreign origin
