= Paegam Airport =

- IATA: none; ICAO: none

Summary
- Airport type: Military
- Serves: Paegam, North Korea
- Elevation AMSL: 3,248 ft / 990 m
- Coordinates: 41°56′37.90″N 128°51′02.70″E
- Interactive map of Paegam Airport

Runways
Direction	Length		Surface
Direction	ft	m	Surface
11/29	4,800	1,463	Grass

Paegam Airport(백암비행장) is an airport in Paegam, Hamgyong-bukto, North Korea.

== Facilities ==
The airfield has a single grass runway 11/29 measuring 4800 x 400 feet (1463 x 122 m). It is sited a few miles from the border with China and approximately 37 km east of Samjiyŏn Airport.
