= Chiktong Airport =

Airport in Hwanghaebuk-to, North Korea

Chik-Tong Airport
- IATA: none; ICAO: none

Summary
- Airport type: Military
- Serves: Koksan, North Korea
- Elevation AMSL: 791 ft / 241 m
- Coordinates: 38°43′43.60″N 126°40′44.20″E

Map

Runways
Direction	Length		Surface
Direction	ft	m	Surface
05/23	880	268	Grass

- Chiktong Airport
- Chosŏn'gŭl: 직동비행장
- Hancha: 直洞飛行場
- Revised Romanization: Jikdong-bihaengjang
- McCune–Reischauer: Chiktong-pihaengjang

Chiktong Airport is an airport in Kyerim-ni, Koksan-gun, Hwanghaebuk-to, North Korea.

== Facilities ==
The airfield has a single grass runway 05/23 measuring 880 x 49 feet (268 x 15 m).
