= Ichon Northeast Airport =

Pangyo Airport
- IATA: none; ICAO: none

Summary
- Airport type: Military
- Serves: Pangyo, North Korea
- Elevation AMSL: 561 ft / 171 m
- Coordinates: 38°40′26.80″N 126°55′26.30″E
- Interactive map of Pangyo Airport

Runways
Direction	Length		Surface
Direction	ft	m	Surface
03/21	3,900	1,189	Grass

- Ichon Northeast Airport
- Hangul: 판교비행장
- Hanja: 板橋飛行場
- RR: Pangyo bihaengjang
- MR: P'an'gyo pihaengjang

Pangyo Airport (a.k.a.Ichon Northeast Airport) is an airport in Pangyo County, Kangwon-do, North Korea.

== Facilities ==
The airfield has a single grass runway 03/21 measuring 3900 x 207 feet (1189 x 63 m). It is sited in a small river valley.
