= Kumgang Airport =

- IATA: none; ICAO: none

Summary
- Airport type: Military
- Serves: Kumgang, North Korea
- Elevation AMSL: 1,407 ft / 429 m
- Coordinates: 38°33′52.30″N 128°00′15.40″E
- Interactive map of Kumgang Airport

Runways
Direction	Length		Surface
Direction	ft	m	Surface
01/19	1,500	457	Grass

Kumgang Airport(금강비행장) is an airport in Kangwon-do, North Korea.

== Facilities ==
The airfield has a single grass runway 01/19 measuring 1500 x 62 feet (457 x 19 m).
