= Rihyon Airport =

- IATA: none; ICAO: none

Summary
- Airport type: Military
- Serves: Sinwon, North Korea
- Elevation AMSL: 600 ft / 183 m
- Coordinates: 38°07′48.30″N 125°50′55.80″E

Map
- Location of airport in North Korea

Runways
Direction	Length		Surface
Direction	ft	m	Surface
09/27	3,530	1,076	Grass

- Rihyon Airport
- Hangul: 리현비행장
- Hanja: 梨峴飛行場
- RR: Rihyeon bihaengjang
- MR: Rihyŏn pihaengjang

Rihyon Airport (a.k.a. Ihyon Airport) is an airport used for military purposes in Ryulla-ri,Sinwon County, Hwanghae-namdo, North Korea.

== Facilities ==
The airfield has a single grass runway 09/27 measuring 3530 x 262 feet (1076 x 80 m). It is sited in a river valley.
