= Taetan Airport =

T'aet'an-pihaengjang Airport
- IATA: N/A; ICAO: N/A; FAA LID: N/A

Summary
- Airport type: Military
- Serves: Taetan, North Korea
- Elevation AMSL: 246 ft (75 m)
- Coordinates: 38°07′48.50″N 125°14′34.90″E

Map
- Location within North Korea Location within Asia Location within North Pacific Location within Earth

Runways
Direction	Length		Surface
Direction	ft	m	Surface
10R/28L	9,220	2,810	Concrete
10L/28R	8,170	2,490	Concrete

- Taetan Airport
- Hangul: 태탄비행장
- Hanja: 苔灘飛行場
- RR: Taetan bihaengjang
- MR: T'aet'an pihaengjang

T'aet'an-pihaengjang Airport is an airport in Taetan, Hwanghae-namdo, North Korea. It is sited in a valley approximately 42 km west-northwest of Haeju.

== Facilities ==
The airfield has two concrete runways that are nearly parallel. Runway 10L/28R measures 8170 x 131 feet (2490 x 40 m) and runway 10R/28L measures 9220 x 79 feet (2810 x 24 m). A single taxiway extends from the end of 28L, then turns south and splits into two taxiways which access underground aircraft shelters.
