= Ichon Airport =

- IATA: none; ICAO: none

Summary
- Airport type: Military
- Serves: Ichon, North Korea
- Elevation AMSL: 430 ft (130 m)
- Coordinates: 38°28′56.00″N 126°51′29.90″E
- Interactive map of Ichon Airport

Runways
Direction	Length		Surface
Direction	ft	m	Surface
07/25	3,910	1,192	Grass

Ichon Airport (Korean: 이천비행장) is an airport in Kangwon-do, North Korea.

== Facilities ==
The airfield has a single grass runway 07/25 measuring 3910 x 197 feet (1192 x 60 m). It is situated in a river plain and is only 30 km from the Military Demarcation Line.
