= Toha Ri North Airport =

Toha Ri Airport
- IATA: none; ICAO: none

Summary
- Airport type: Military
- Serves: Toha Ri, North Korea
- Elevation AMSL: 840 ft / 256 m
- Coordinates: 38°42′11.30″N 126°17′05.30″E

Map
- Location of airport in North Korea

Runways
Direction	Length		Surface
Direction	ft	m	Surface
09/27	2,400	732	Grass

Toha Ri Airport (도하리비행장) is an airport in Hwanghae-bukto, North Korea.

== Facilities ==
The airfield has a single grass runway 09/27 measuring 2400 x 171 feet (732 x 52 m).
