= Hyon Ni Airport =

Airport in North Korea

Hyon Ni airport
- IATA: N/A; ICAO: N/A; FAA LID: N/A

Summary
- Airport type: Military
- Serves: Hoeyang and Sepo, North Korea
- Elevation AMSL: 1,913 ft / 583 m
- Coordinates: 38°36′48.60″N 127°27′06.30″E

Map
- Location of airport in North Korea Hyon Ni (Asia) Hyon Ni (North Pacific ) Hyon Ni (Earth)

Runways
Direction	Length		Surface
Direction	ft	m	Surface
02/20	8,870	2,704	Concrete

- Hyon Ni Airport
- Chosŏn'gŭl: 현리비행장
- Hancha: 縣里飛行場
- Revised Romanization: Hyeon-ri bihaengjang
- McCune–Reischauer: Hyŏl-li pihaengjang

Hyon Ni Airport is an airport near Hyŏl-li in Hoeyang-gun, Kangwon-do, North Korea. located 17 km southwest of Hoeyang-up.

== Facilities ==
The airfield has a single concrete runway 02/20 measuring 8870 x 154 feet (2704 x 47 m). It is sited in a valley and has a full-length parallel taxiway, as well as other taxiways leading to dispersed stands and at least 4 underground shelters.
