= Unchon Up Airport =

- IATA: none; ICAO: none

Summary
- Airport type: Military
- Serves: Unchon Up, Unchon County, North Korea
- Elevation AMSL: 482 ft / 147 m
- Coordinates: 38°32′52.40″N 125°20′00.10″E

Map
- Location of airport in North Korea

Runways
Direction	Length		Surface
Direction	ft	m	Surface
02/20	2,500	762	Grass

Unchon Up Airport(은천비행장) is an airport in Hwanghae-namdo, North Korea.

== Facilities ==
The airfield has a single grass runway 02/20 measuring 2500 x 128 feet (762 x 39 m).
