= Taebukpo Ri Airport =

- IATA: none; ICAO: none

Summary
- Airport type: Military
- Serves: Tosan, North Korea
- Elevation AMSL: 223 ft / 68 m
- Coordinates: 38°19′59.30″N 126°52′17″E

Map
- Location of airport in North Korea

Runways
Direction	Length		Surface
Direction	ft	m	Surface
10/28	6,620	2,018	Grass

- Taebukpo Ri Airport
- Chosŏn'gŭl: 대북포리비행장
- Hancha: 大北浦里飛行場
- Revised Romanization: Daebukpo-ri bihaengjang
- McCune–Reischauer: Taebukp'o-ri pihaengjang

Taebukpo Ri Airport is an airport in Pukp'o-ri, Tosan County, Hwanghae-bukto, North Korea.

== Facilities ==
The airfield has a single grass runway 10/28 measuring 6620 × 282 feet (2018 × 86 m). It is sited in a river plain.
