= Uiju Airfield =

Airport in North Korea

- IATA: UJU; ICAO: ZKUJ

Summary
- Airport type: Military
- Serves: Uiju, North Korea
- Elevation AMSL: 32 ft / 10 m
- Coordinates: 40°09′06.20″N 124°29′54.80″E

Map

Runways
Direction	Length		Surface
Direction	ft	m	Surface
05/23	8,180	2,493	Concrete

- Uiju Airfield
- Hangul: 의주비행장
- Hanja: 義州飛行場
- RR: Uiju bihaengjang
- MR: Ŭiju pihaengjang

Uiju Airfield (IATA: UJU, ICAO: ZKUJ) is an airport in Uiju County, Pyongan-bukto, North Korea.

== History ==
In May 1982, three STYX Cruise Missile containers arrived at the airfield's ordnance storage facility. The storage facility consisted of two large, two medium concrete bunkers, two vehicle storage buildings, and three support buildings. In January 1983, 25 Ilyushin Il-28 departed from the airfield and were deployed to Taetan Airport. In November 1983, a STYX Cruise Missile and associated STYX equipment was deployed on the airfield.

In March 2021, the airfield served as the Uiju Quarantine Center, as part of North Korea's response to the COVID-19 pandemic. By December, the quarantine center opened. The center also served as a cargo decontamination facility for containers brought in by freight trains from China. In August 2024, the containers were all removed. After three years of absence, 31 Ilyushin IL-28 medium-range bombers arrived at the airfield. The bombers belonged to the 24th Bomber Regiment.

In October 2024, 31 H-5 bombers were spotted on satellite having returned to the airfield, along with several other H-5 and Mikoyan-Gurevich MiG-21 that were likely not airworthy.

In April 2026 satellite imagery showed that the runway was extended.

The airfield is home to the Korean People's Army Air Force's 24th Bomber Regiment, which has at least 32 Harbin H-5 (Ilyushin Il-28) bombers on site as of 2010.

== Facilities ==
The airfield has a single concrete runway 05/23 measuring 8180 x 174 feet (2493 x 53 m). It is sited in the Yalu River plain, a few miles northeast of the Chinese city of Dandong. It is also a few miles northeast of Sinuiju Airport. It has a full-length parallel taxiway, and several taxiways that access dispersed aircraft stands.
