= Tanchon South Airport =

- IATA: none; ICAO: none

Summary
- Airport type: Military
- Serves: Tanchon, North Korea
- Elevation AMSL: 128 ft / 39 m
- Coordinates: 40°23′51.10″N 128°51′39.80″E

Map
- Location of airport in North Korea

Runways
Direction	Length		Surface
Direction	ft	m	Surface
14/32	6,100	1,859	Gravel

Tanchon South Airport (남단천비행장) is an airport in Hamgyong-namdo, North Korea.

== Facilities ==
The airfield has a single gravel runway 14/32 measuring 6,100 ft × 75 ft (1,859 m × 23 m).
