= Maengsan Airport =

- IATA: none; ICAO: none

Summary
- Airport type: Military
- Serves: Maengsan, North Korea
- Elevation AMSL: 2,087 ft / 636 m
- Coordinates: 39°39′10.20″N 126°40′12.80″E
- Interactive map of Maengsan Airport

Runways
Direction	Length		Surface
Direction	ft	m	Surface
11/29	9,550	2,911	Grass

Maengsan Airport(맹산비행장) is an airport in Pyongan-namdo, North Korea.

== Facilities ==
The airfield has a single grass runway 11/29 measuring 9550 x 207 feet (2911 x 63 m).
