= Koksan Airport =

- IATA: none; ICAO: none

Summary
- Airport type: Military
- Serves: Koksan, North Korea
- Elevation AMSL: 3,832 ft (1,168 m)
- Coordinates: 38°41′22.80″N 126°36′15.30″E

Map
- Location within North Korea Location within Asia Location within North Pacific Location within Earth

Runways
Direction	Length		Surface
Direction	ft	m	Surface
07/25	8,190	2,496	Concrete

- Koksan Airport
- Hangul: 곡산비행장
- Hanja: 谷山飛行場
- RR: Goksan bihaengjang
- MR: Koksan pihaengjang

Koksan Airport is an airport near Koksan, Hwanghae-bukto, North Korea.

== Facilities ==
The airfield has a single concrete runway 06/24 measuring 8190 x 141 feet (2496 x 43 m). It has a full-length parallel taxiway with two aprons at the ends, as well as a taxiway leading southwest to dispersed aircraft stands. It is in close proximity to several other airfields including Koksan South Highway Strip 1 & 2, Pyonsul Li, and Wongyo Ri. It is home to a fighter regiment of 24 MiG-21 jets.
