= Sinŭiju Airport =

Sinŭiju Airfield
- IATA: N/A; ICAO: N/A

Summary
- Airport type: Military
- Serves: Sinŭiju, North Korea
- Elevation AMSL: 23 ft (7.0 m)
- Coordinates: 40°05′11.10″N 124°24′25.20″E
- Interactive map of Sinŭiju Airfield

Runways
| Direction | Length | | Surface |
| Direction | ft | m | Surface |
|---|---|---|---|
| 03/21 | 3,250 | 991 | Grass |

Sinŭiju Airfield (신의주공항) is an airport near Sinŭiju, Pyongan-bukto, North Korea.

== Facilities ==
The airfield has a single turf runway 03/21 measuring 3250 x 213 feet (991 x 65 m). It is located just south of the city, which itself is across the Yalu River from the Chinese city of Dandong. It is also a few miles southwest of Uiju Airfield, a military airbase.

== History ==
=== Korean War ===
The airfield was designated as K-30 by the USAF and was a frequent target during the Korean War because of its strategic importance, including not only based MiG and Yak aircraft, but also its proximity to major railroad lines.

On 1 November 1950 an RF-80 observed 15 Yaks parked in revetments near the airfield, three flights of F-80s proceeded to strafe the airfield destroying one Yak and damaging 6 others.

On 23 January 1951, 33 F-84s of the 27th Fighter-Escort Wing attacked Sinŭiju airfield, provoking a response from the MiG-15s based across the Chinese border at Antung airfield, with 3 or 4 MiG-15s shot down in the ensuing dogfights.

In late April 1951 reconnaissance showed that the KPAF had based 38 Yak-9s, Il-10s and La-5s in revetments at Sinŭiju. On 9 May 312 Fifth Air Force and 1st Marine Aircraft Wing planes attacked the base destroying all of the aircraft, numerous buildings, fuel and supply dumps.

On 9 July MiG-15s intercepted 6 B-29s that were attacking the airfield, 1 MiG was shot down by escorting F-86s while another was shot down by B-29 gunners.
