= Samjiyon =

Samjiyŏn 삼지연시
- Municipal City

Korean transcription(s)
  - Chosŏn'gŭl: 삼지연시
  - Hanja: 三池淵市
  - McCune-Reischauer: Samjiyŏn-si
  - Revised Romanization: Samjiyeon-si
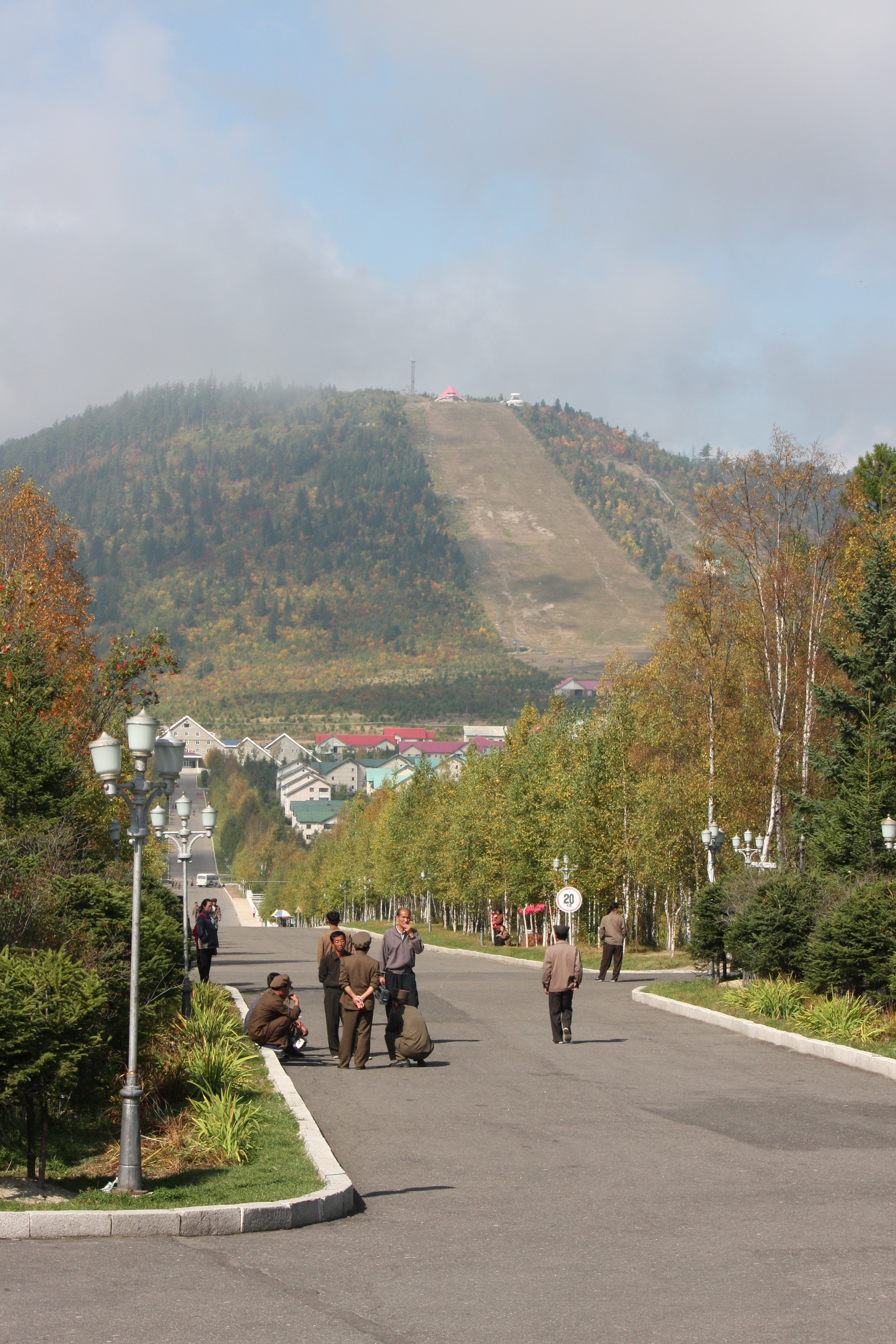
- View of Samjiyon in 2008

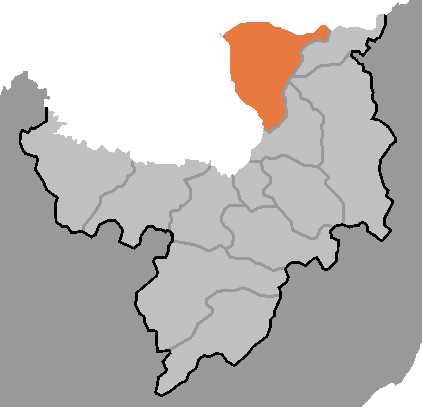
- Map of Ryanggang showing the location of Samjiyon

- Location within North Korea
- Coordinates: 41°48′N 128°19′E
- Country: North Korea
- Province: Ryanggang
- Administrative divisions: 10 dong, 6 ri

Area
  - Total: 1,326.14 km^{2} (512.03 sq mi)
- Elevation: 1,381 m (4,531 ft)

Population (2008)
  - Total: 31,471
  - Dialect: Hamgyŏng
- Time zone: UTC+9 (Pyongyang Time)

Samjiyŏn is a city in Ryanggang Province, North Korea. It takes its name from three lakes in the city, which are collectively known as the Samjiyŏn. Samjiyŏn is situated near Mount Paektu, and tour groups fly to the city's airport to see the mountain, which holds significance in North Korean mythology.

Many houses and buildings in Samjiyŏn have been upgraded in recent decades, and many new buildings, including a recreational centre for youths, were finished in 2005. Popular activities in Samjiyŏn are skiing and various activities for schoolchildren, who use the surrounding area of Mt. Paektu for various scouting-like operations in conjunction with school-led vacations or outings.

In December 2019, Kim Jong Un opened a completed expansion of the existing township, described by state media as a "modern" city with residences and industrial parks. The city was known as a county until a decision to upgrade its status was made in December 2019. The modernization of Samjiyon City is to also help boost tourism to North Korea. The city opened for international tourists in December 2024.

== Administrative divisions ==
Samjiyŏn is divided into 10 dong (neighborhoods) and 6 ri (villages):

- Ikkal-dong
- Kwangmyŏngsŏng-dong
- Mubong-dong
- Ohomultong-dong
- Paektusanmiryŏng-dong
- Pegaebong-dong
- P'ot'ae-dong
- Ponnamu-dong
- Rimyŏngsu-dong
- Sinmusŏng-dong
- Chunghŭng-ri
- Hŭnggyesu-ri
- Sobaeksan-ri
- Paeksam-ri
- Posŏ-ri
- T'ongsin-ri

== Transportation ==
=== Air ===
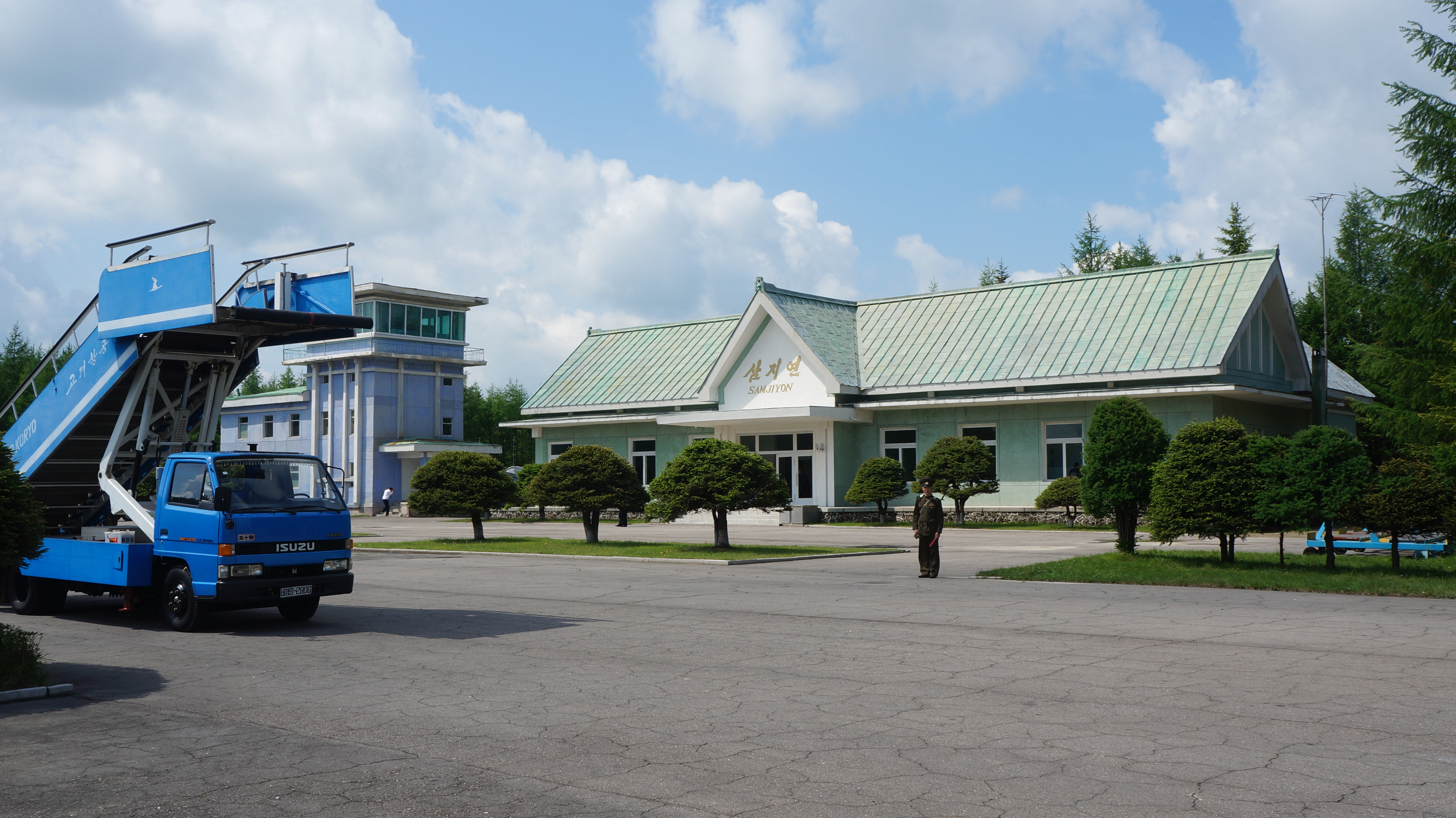
Samjiyŏn Airport

Samjiyŏn is served by the Korean People's Air Force along with the national flag carrier Air Koryo which operates scheduled flights and charter services between Samjiyŏn and P'yŏngyang, Wŏnsan and Ch'ŏngjin. In 2005, the airport was closed due to major renovations, which were partially underwritten by the Hyundai corporation.

=== Rail ===
Samjiyŏn city is served by the narrow-gauge Samjiyŏn Line of the Korean State Railway. Construction of a new, 78 kilometres (48 mi) standard-gauge line from the Pukbunaeryuk Line at Hyesan to Samjiyŏn is underway since 2008, with 80% of the roadbed and 70% of lineside structures being complete as of June 2015; the new terminus station is to be at Chunghŭng-ri, Samjiyŏn city.

==== Hyesan No.1/Wangdŏk Railway Station ====
The current train station for the leader is located near Ŭihwa-ri in Poch'ŏn county, Ryanggang, in a very narrow gorge, making aerial attack difficult. The facilities of this station are much more sophisticated than the nearby civilian Hyesan Ch'ŏngnyŏn Station. Officially called Hyesan No.1 Railway Station, it is commonly known as Wangdŏk Station due to the original 1985 station having been built only 2 kilometres (1.2 mi) from Wangdŏk.

The first station was built in 1985, but as it was easily viewed from China, in 1989 it was destroyed and moved to a second site, 2 kilometres (1.2 mi) north of the current third site. However, on inspecting the completed facilities, Kim Il Sung deemed it unsuitable, as it was in view of China's mountains. Ordering a third rebuild, the second station was taken over by the Samjiyŏn Precision Machinery Factory (the No. 95 Munitions Factory) after completion of the current, third site, in 1992. This third station is located directly on the Paektu Mountain Tourist Road, which gives direct access to Kim Il Sung’s palace compound. 20 civilian personnel and two military squads protect the area immediately around the station. During the annual visit by the leader in July or August, the entire civilian population is employed to clean the transportation system and local environment.

== Tourism ==
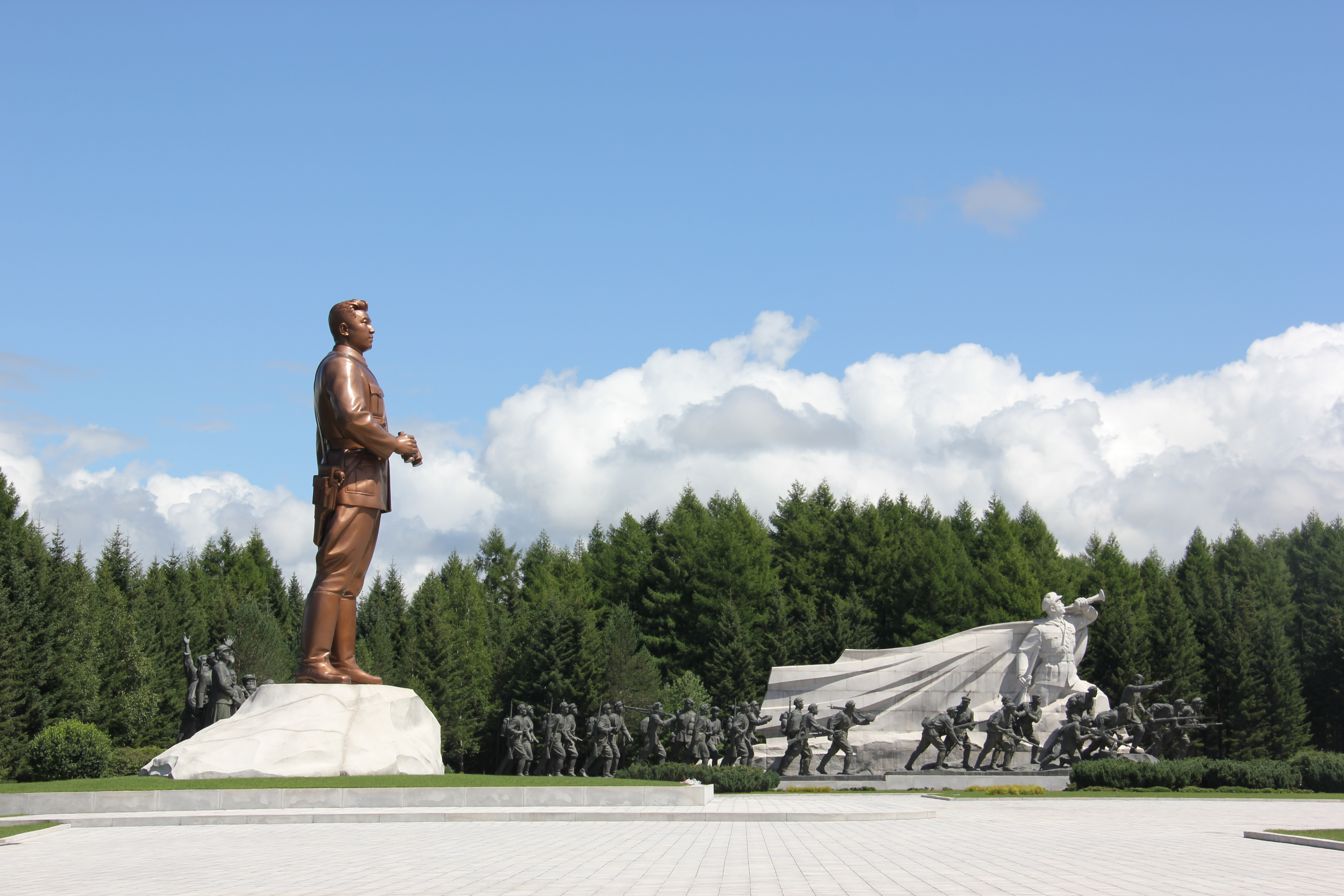
The Samjiyon Grand Monument

The Samjiyon Grand Monument consists of four groups of sculptures called On the Battlefield, Fatherland, Longing, and Forwards. Five luxury hotels opened in the city in December 2025.

== Presidential palaces ==
Samjiyŏn has been a holiday resort and destination for two leaders of North Korea. Both Kim Il Sung and Kim Jong Il have established palaces and compounds in the area, accessed by a specially developed and exclusive railway station for the leaders’ train.

== Climate ==
Samjiyon has a subarctic climate (Köppen climate classification Dwc/Dwb) with cool summers and cold, dry winters.

Climate data for Samjiyon (1991–2020 normals, extremes 1976-present)
Month	Jan	Feb	Mar	Apr	May	Jun	Jul	Aug	Sep	Oct	Nov	Dec	Year
Record high °C (°F)	5.3 (41.5)	12.0 (53.6)	14.7 (58.5)	24.5 (76.1)	32.9 (91.2)	29.8 (85.6)	32.3 (90.1)	34.2 (93.6)	29.0 (84.2)	23.8 (74.8)	18.0 (64.4)	10.2 (50.4)	34.2 (93.6)
Mean daily maximum °C (°F)	−10.2 (13.6)	−6.7 (19.9)	−0.9 (30.4)	7.8 (46.0)	15.4 (59.7)	19.8 (67.6)	22.6 (72.7)	22.0 (71.6)	17.1 (62.8)	9.8 (49.6)	−0.8 (30.6)	−8.6 (16.5)	7.3 (45.1)
Daily mean °C (°F)	−16.9 (1.6)	−13.7 (7.3)	−7.2 (19.0)	1.5 (34.7)	8.5 (47.3)	13.2 (55.8)	16.8 (62.2)	16.1 (61.0)	10.0 (50.0)	2.6 (36.7)	−6.6 (20.1)	−14.5 (5.9)	0.8 (33.4)
Mean daily minimum °C (°F)	−23.2 (−9.8)	−20.9 (−5.6)	−14.7 (5.5)	−5.1 (22.8)	1.8 (35.2)	7.0 (44.6)	11.7 (53.1)	11.0 (51.8)	3.3 (37.9)	−3.9 (25.0)	−12.4 (9.7)	−20.5 (−4.9)	−5.5 (22.1)
Record low °C (°F)	−42.0 (−43.6)	−42.0 (−43.6)	−33.6 (−28.5)	−23.0 (−9.4)	−9.0 (15.8)	−3.7 (25.3)	0.0 (32.0)	−3.8 (25.2)	−11.7 (10.9)	−25.5 (−13.9)	−31.4 (−24.5)	−38.9 (−38.0)	−42.0 (−43.6)
Average precipitation mm (inches)	14.7 (0.58)	17.5 (0.69)	31.5 (1.24)	46.5 (1.83)	91.4 (3.60)	128.5 (5.06)	188.9 (7.44)	188.9 (7.44)	72.6 (2.86)	42.3 (1.67)	44.7 (1.76)	23.6 (0.93)	891.1 (35.08)
Average precipitation days (≥ 0.1 mm)	9.4	8.7	11.8	11.3	15.0	16.9	17.0	15.5	9.0	8.7	12.3	11.9	147.5
Average snowy days	14.5	12.5	16.7	12.6	4.0	0.5	0.1	0.1	0.3	6.7	16.0	17.2	101.2
Average relative humidity (%)	76.8	72.6	69.5	66.1	68.2	78.1	84.1	84.5	77.1	69.9	75.8	78.1	75.1
Source 1: Korea Meteorological Administration
Source 2: NOAA (extremes)

== Sport ==
It has one of the three speed skating ovals in the country.

== See also ==
- List of cities in North Korea
- Geography of North Korea
