= Taetan County =

T'aet'an County 태탄군
- County

Korean transcription(s)
  - Hanja: 苔灘郡
  - McCune-Reischauer: T‘aet‘an-kun
  - Revised Romanization: Taetan-gun
- Interactive map of T'aet'an County
- Country: North Korea
- Province: South Hwanghae Province

Area
  - Total: 357 km^{2} (138 sq mi)

Population (2008)
  - Total: 64,258
  - Density: 180/km^{2} (466/sq mi)

T'aet'an County is a county in South Hwanghae province, North Korea.

== Administrative divisions ==
T'aet'an county is divided into 1 ŭp (town) and 15 ri (villages):

- T'aet'an-ŭp
- Chich'ol-li
- Hakch'ŏl-li
- Kiam-ri
- Kongse-ri
- Kwasal-li
- Mokkam-ri
- Musal-li
- Og'am-ri
- Puyang-ri
- Ryujŏng-ri
- Sambong-ri
- Sŏngnam-ri
- Sudong-ri
- Taejil-li
- Unsal-li
