= Hoeyang County =

Hoeyang County 회양군
- County

Korean transcription(s)
  - Chosŏn'gŭl: 회양군
  - Hancha: 淮陽郡
  - McCune-Reischauer: Hoeyang-gun
  - Revised Romanization: Hoeyang-gun
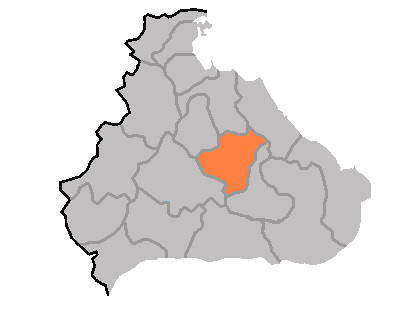
- Map of Kangwon showing the location of Hoeyang
- Coordinates: 38°42′32″N 127°35′56″E
- Country: North Korea
- Province: Kangwŏn Province
- Administrative divisions: 1 ŭp, 23 ri

Area
  - Total: 540 km^{2} (210 sq mi)

Population (2008 census)
  - Total: 42,485
  - Density: 79/km^{2} (200/sq mi)

Hoeyang County is a kun, or county, in Kangwŏn province, North Korea. It was established in a general reorganization of local government in 1952. A power plant was completed in the area in 2025.

== Geography ==
The county's area is primarily mountainous, with the Taebaek and Kwangju ranges both passing through the county. Two basins, the Hoeyang Basin and Changdo Basin, interrupt the rugged terrain. The highest point is Piryubong on Kŭmgangsan. The chief local stream is the Pukhan River, which flows south and east into South Korea. The climate is continental, with extremely cold winters.

== Administrative divisions ==
Hoeyang county is divided into 1 ŭp (town) and 23 ri (villages):

- Hoeyang-ŭp
- Chŏngong-ri
- Chŏnhang-ri
- Hagyo-ri
- Hyŏl-li
- Kajŏng-ri
- Kangdol-li
- Kŭmch'ŏl-li
- Kŭmgong-ri
- Kwangjŏl-li
- Kwirang-li
- Majŏl-li
- Obong-ri
- Orang-ri
- Pongp'o-ri
- P'ochŏl-li
- Ryongp'o-ri
- Singye-ri
- Sinmyŏng-ri
- Sinp'yŏng-ri
- Sŏndae-ri
- Sop'ung-ri
- Tonam-ri
- Yuŭp-ri

== Economy ==
The chief local industry is agriculture, although the terrain does not permit rice to be cultivated; instead, local crops include barley, wheat, oats, millet, maize, soybeans, and potatoes. Cattle are also raised. The maize-based yŏt candy from the district is widely known. Local mines work to extract the deposits of tungsten, barite, molybdenum, graphite, gold, silver, and lead found in the county.

== Transportation ==
Hoeyang is served by roads, and also by the Kŭmgangsan Ch'ŏngnyŏn Line of the Korean State Railway.

== See also ==
- Geography of North Korea
- Administrative divisions of North Korea
- Kangwon (North Korea)
