= Samjiyon Airport =

Samjiyŏn Airport
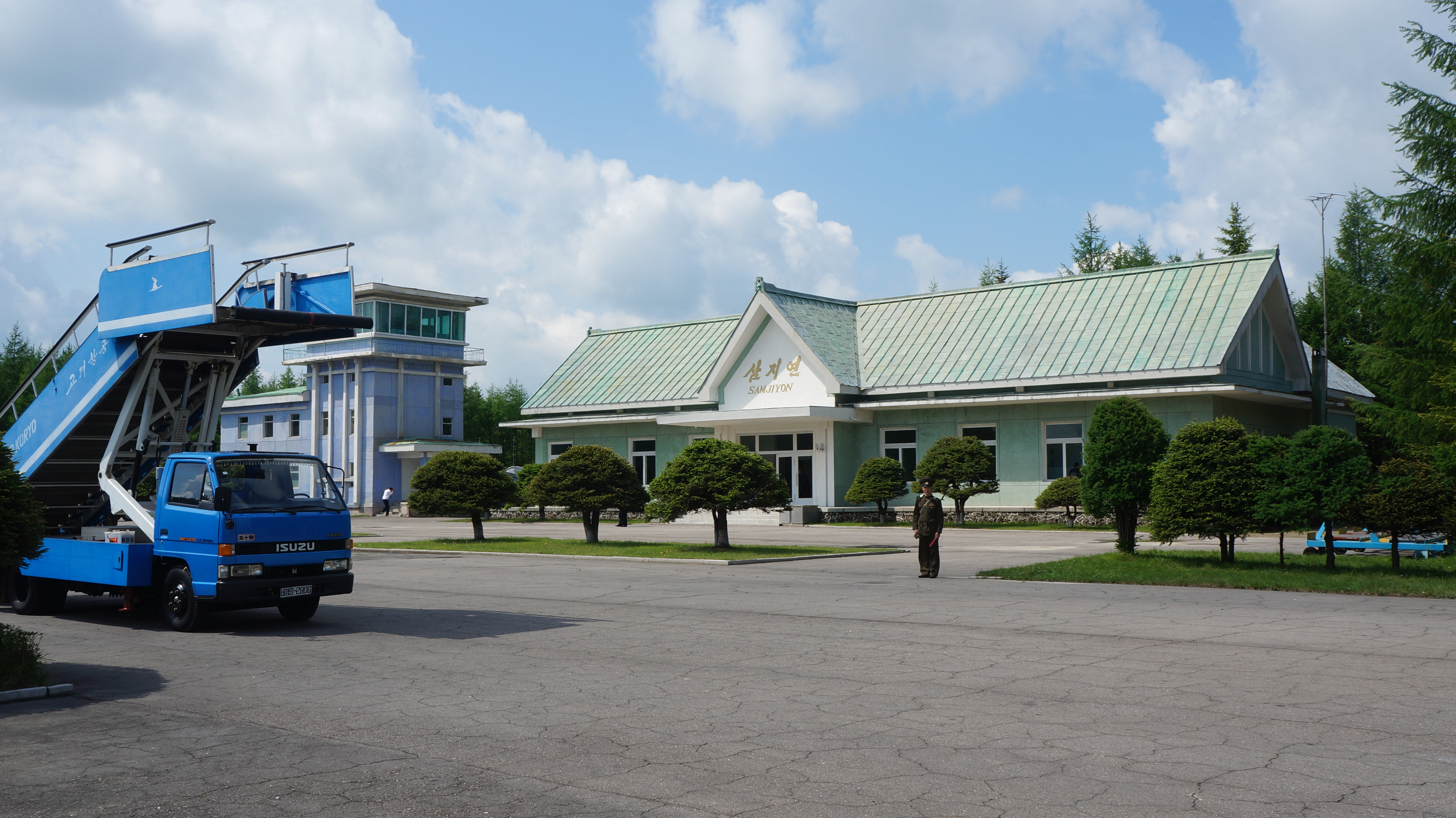
- IATA: YJS; ICAO: ZKSE

Summary
- Airport type: Military/Public
- Owner: Government of North Korea
- Operator: Civil Aviation Administration of Korea
- Serves: Samjiyŏn, North Korea
- Elevation AMSL: 4,547 ft (1,386 m)
- Coordinates: 41°54′25.80″N 128°24′35.60″E

Map
- Location within North Korea

Runways
Direction	Length		Surface
Direction	ft	m	Surface
07/25	10,827	3,300	Asphalt

- Samjiyon Airport
- Hangul: 삼지연공항
- Hanja: 三池淵空港
- RR: Samjiyeon gonghang
- MR: Samjiyŏn konghang

Samjiyŏn Airport (IATA: YJS, ICAO: ZKSE) is an airport in Samjiyon City, Ryanggang Province, North Korea.

== Overview ==
The airport is located near Baekdu Mountain. Tour groups fly to the airport for scheduled journeys to this significant landmark and to see the birthplace of Kim Jong-il. All tours to the area will include a trip here. There is a high presence of military equipment at this airport, there are large numbers of older Soviet jets such as MiG-15's lined up in sidings next to the runway and many utility vehicles/jeeps. Whether or not these are operational is unknown, but highly unlikely given their apparent condition.

The airport was built in the 1980s to accommodate a ski center planned by a South Korean company. The venture failed, and Samjiyŏn airport now sits in a deserted location. The only flights to this airport are from Pyongyang Sunan International Airport and served by the country's only airline: Air Koryo.

In 2025, redevelopment of the airport began, with a new two-gate terminal and a railway station for train connections to Samjiyon being built in order to facilitate planned tourism in the city.

In April 2026 satellite imagery showed that the runway was expanded and features the angled exit taxiways.

== Facilities ==
The airfield has a single asphalt runway 07/25, measuring 10750 x 197 feet (3277 x 60 m). It has a full-length parallel taxiway. Entrances to underground bunkers are clearly visible in satellite photography of the base.

== Airlines and destinations ==
Airlines	Destinations
Air Koryo	Pyongyang
