= Koksan County =

Coordinates: 38.785°N 126.668°E

Koksan County 곡산군
- County

Korean transcription(s)
  - Hanja: 谷山郡
  - McCune-Reischauer: Koksan-kun
  - Revised Romanization: Goksan-gun
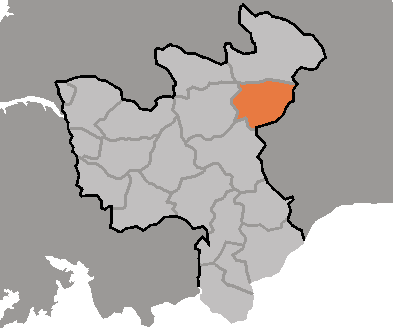
- Map of North Hwanghae showing the location of Koksan
- Country: North Korea
- Province: North Hwanghae Province

Area
  - Total: 508.9 km^{2} (196.5 sq mi)

Population (2008)
  - Total: 120,693
  - Density: 237.2/km^{2} (614.3/sq mi)

Koksan is a county in the North Hwanghae Province, North Korea.

== Administrative divisions ==
Koksan county is divided into 1 ŭp (town) and 20 ri (villages):

- Koksan-ŭp
- Ch'ŏngsong-ri
- Ch'op'yŏng-ri
- Hoam-ri
- Hyŏn'am-ri
- Kusŏng-ri
- Kyerim-ri
- Kyesu-ri
- Mugal-li
- Munyang-ri
- Orip'o-ri
- Pongsal-li
- P'yŏngam-ri
- Ryongam-ri
- Ryul-li
- Sahyŏl-li
- Serim-ri
- Sŏch'ol-li
- Songrim-ri
- Tŏkhŭng-ri
- Wŏlyang-ri
