= Safa =

Safa or SAFA may refer to:

== Organizations ==
=== Sport ===
- Safa SC, an association football club in Lebanon
- Safa WFC, a women's association football club in Lebanon
- Scottish Amateur Football Association, governing body for amateur football in Scotland
- South African Football Association, national governing body for association football in the Republic of South Africa
- South Australian Football Association, an early name (1877–1906) of the South Australian National Football League
- South Australian Football Association (1978–95), a defunct Australian rules football competition that ran from 1978-95

=== Other organizations ===
- Palestinian Press Agency, Gaza-based Palestinian news agency also known as Safa News Agency (stylized as SAFA)
- SAFA (architecture), professional body representing architects in Finland
- Sino-American Friendship Association
- South Asian Federation of Accountants
- Student Action for Aborigines, a University of Sydney student group that organised the Freedom Ride in New South Wales in 1965

== People ==
=== People with the given name ===
- Safa Giray (1931–2011), Turkish civil engineer and politician
- Safa Haeri (1937–2016), Iranian–French journalist
- Safa Khulusi (1917–1995), Iraqi historian, novelist, poet, journalist and broadcaster
- Safa al-Safi (fl. 2006–2011), Iraqi politician
- Safa Zaki, American psychologist, cognitive scientist, and academic administrator

=== People with the surname ===
- Peyami Safa (1899–1961), Turkish man of letters
- Iskandar Safa (1955-2024), Lebanese–French businessman
- Saman Safa (born 1985), Iranian football player
- Jinan Safa (born 1999), an Indonesian singer, actress, and dancer
- Zabihollah Safa (1911–1999), Iranian scholar and professor

== Places ==
- Khirbet Safa, a Palestinian village near Hebron, West Bank
- Nebi Safa, a village in Lebanon
- Safa, North Khorasan, a village in North Khorasan Province, Iran
- Safa and Marwah, two small hills in Saudi Arabia
- Safa Park, a park in Dubai, United Arab Emirates
- Safa Stadium, a multi-use stadium in Beirut, Lebanon

== Other uses ==
- Safa, a style of pagri (turban)
- Safa (mythology), a god of the hearth chain in Ossetian mythology
- SAFA programme, a European aviation safety program
- Safa (album), an album by Siti Nurhaliza

== See also ==
- Al-Safa (disambiguation)
- Saffa (disambiguation)
