= Malaysia–North Korea relations =

- Malaysia: North Korea

Diplomatic mission
- Embassy of Malaysia, Pyongyang: Embassy of North Korea, Kuala Lumpur

Envoy
- Ambassador Vacant: Ambassador Vacant

Malaysia–North Korea relations (Note: Malay: Hubungan Korea Utara–Malaysia; Korean: 말레이시아–조선민주주의인민공화국 관계 malleisia–joseonminjujuuiinmingonghwagug gwangye) were once strong but deteriorated following the 2017 assassination of Kim Jong-nam in Kuala Lumpur. Since 2021, the two countries have not maintained diplomatic ties, and relations are hostile.

Malaysia was once one of the few countries with which North Korea enjoyed functional diplomatic and economic relationships. Malaysia had an embassy in Pyongyang, and North Korea had an embassy in Kuala Lumpur.

Relations between Malaysia and North Korea disintegrated in 2017, in the aftermath of the assassination of Kim Jong-nam in Kuala Lumpur International Airport, which sparked a major diplomatic row between the two countries. In retaliation for Malaysia's refusal to release Kim's body pending the results of an autopsy, staff at the Malaysian embassy were prevented from leaving North Korea, and were only allowed to return home after Malaysia relented to North Korea's request to hand over Kim's remains (after an autopsy had been performed) and two North Korean nationals who had been detained for questioning in Malaysia.

Amid the 2018–19 Korean peace process, Malaysia announced it would re-open its embassy in North Korea and resume relations. Because of ongoing bilateral complications, the Malaysian embassy remained vacant. North Korea severed ties with Malaysia on 19 March 2021 due to the latter's extradition of a North Korean national to the United States. The same day, the Malaysian government declared all North Korean diplomatic staff and their dependents personae non gratae and ordered them to leave the country within 48 hours. As of 2025, Malaysia is the only country in Southeast Asia that does not maintain diplomatic relations with North Korea and bans its people from travelling to the country.

== History ==
Relations between the two countries started on 30 June 1973. This was part of a broader campaign by North Korea to enhance its ties with the developing world.

The North Korean embassy was opened in Kuala Lumpur in 1974 and Malaysia sent its first ambassador to the DPRK in 2004. After Mahathir Mohamad became prime minister of Malaysia in 1981, relations developed quickly with exchanges of ministerial visits and aspirations to promote mutual economic development and peace on the peninsula.

Relations between both countries improved and in 2009, Malaysia became the first country whose citizens were able to travel to North Korea without a visa. In 2013, the supreme leader of North Korea Kim Jong-un received an honorary doctorate from HELP University, a Malaysian university.

=== Assassination of Kim Jong-nam in Malaysia ===
On 13 February 2017, Kim Jong-nam, Kim Jong-un's half-brother, was killed in Malaysia in a presumed assassination. This resulted in a rapid escalation of tensions.

The Malaysian authorities conducted an autopsy which resulted in opposition from North Korea. The North Korean government said that it will oppose any results of the findings, claiming that it was conducted on its citizen without their permission, and that they will take the issue to the International Court of Justice (ICJ). It also accused Malaysia of colluding with its enemies. The Malaysian side argued that any such incidents happening on a country's soil are subject to that country's laws, and stressed the need to find the cause of death and confirm the identity of the deceased. After North Korean ambassador Kang Chol's comments, he was summoned by the Malaysian Foreign Affairs Ministry on 20 February, while the Malaysian ambassador to North Korea had also been recalled.

Following the revelation that Kim's death was the result of the VX nerve agent, a nerve agent classified as a weapon of mass destruction by the United Nations Security Council Resolution 687 and outlawed by the Chemical Weapons Convention of 1993, Malaysia threatened the expulsion of the North Korean ambassador to Malaysia, referring to his claims of collusion as "delusional". The North Korean government then dispatched a high-level delegation to Malaysia.

Beginning on 6 March, Malaysia cancelled the visa-free entry for North Koreans, citing "security issues" following the murder incident. On 4 March, the North Korean ambassador Kang Chol was declared a persona non grata and expelled for the next 48 hours, to which North Korea reacted in kind. North Korean authorities also reacted on 7 March by forbidding all Malaysian citizens in North Korea from entering or leaving the country. Malaysian authorities retaliated by forbidding North Korean citizens from entering or leaving Malaysia.

On 30 March, after negotiations between both sides to end their dispute, all stranded Malaysians in North Korea and North Koreans in Malaysia were allowed to return to their respective countries with a recent receipt of a letter from the deceased's family requesting the remains of Kim's be returned to his country following the completion of further autopsy.

Shortly after the deal, Malaysian Prime Minister Najib Razak said that the Government of Malaysia had no intention to cut diplomatic ties with North Korea and considered the hostage crisis over, expressing hope that North Korea would never resort to unlawful action and go against international law again for taking hostages.

However, in the aftermath of the incident, in September 2017, the Malaysian government banned all of its citizens from travelling to North Korea, with the Malaysian government's view that travel to North Korea would be permitted once the diplomatic situation became normal. In 2018, Malaysia chose not to accept the North Korean invitation to attend military parades in Pyongyang.

Following the 2018 North Korea–United States Summit held in Singapore on 12 June 2018, the new Pakatan Harapan government in Malaysia under Prime Minister Mahathir Mohamad said "the world should not treat North Korea leader Kim Jong-un with skepticism and instead learn from his new attitude towards bringing about peace". In a joint press conference in Tokyo with Japan, he said: "We hoped for a successful outcome from the historic meeting", adding that "Malaysia will re-open their embassy in North Korea as an end to the diplomatic row over the assassination of Kim Jong-nam". On 13 February 2019, Mahathir said that Malaysia will settle its problem with North Korea soon after the second summit between North Korea and the United States held in Vietnam on 27 February. On 25 October 2019, Mahathir met with the President of the Presidium of the Supreme People's Assembly Choe Ryong-hae in Baku, Azerbaijan, to discuss re-establishing diplomatic ties.

On 3 January 2020, Malaysia officially announced the reopening of its embassy in North Korea. However, the reopening did not occur, due to the Malaysian political crisis.

=== Severance of diplomatic ties ===
On 19 March 2021, North Korea announced the severance of diplomatic ties with Malaysia, after the Kuala Lumpur High Court rejected North Korean businessman Mun Chol Myong's appeal from extradition to the United States, on money laundering charges, which his lawyers maintained were related mainly to his activities in Singapore.

In response on the same day, Malaysia noted that it deeply regretted North Korea's decision, whilst also denouncing it as "unfriendly and unconstructive, disrespecting the spirit of mutual respect and good neighbourly relations among members of the international community". The Ministry of Foreign Affairs, Malaysia also noted that the Executive complied with the judicial process of Malaysia, the charges of money laundering along with violating United Nations sanctions are also considered offences in Malaysia and the extradition only occurred after all appeals were exhausted. Malaysia was compelled to close its embassy in Pyongyang, although its operations were suspended by Malaysia since 2017. Malaysia also issued an order for all North Korean diplomatic staff (and their dependents) in Kuala Lumpur to leave the country within 48 hours of the severance of ties.

In September 2025, North Korean leader Kim Jong Un and Malaysian Prime Minister Anwar Ibrahim met in Beijing; both leaders were in China to attend the 2025 China Victory Day Parade. Anwar later said he "coincidentially" encountered Kim, and the meeting was considered unusual due to the continuing lack of diplomatic relations.

== Economic and cultural relations ==
North Korea imports refined oil, natural rubber and palm oil from Malaysia. Malaysia imports iron and steel products from North Korea. In 2017, there were 300 North Koreans working in the coal mining industry in Sarawak state of Malaysia.

In 2011, Malaysia's Bernama reported that the two countries would enhance co-operation in information-related areas. In 2017, both countries signed a memorandum of understanding in the exchange of culture.

North Korea had been working together with Malaysia's tourism sector to promote travel to North Korea. From 2001 to 2009, more than 1,000 Malaysians visited North Korea. In 2011, North Korea opened an air route to Malaysia to attract more tourists from the country. In early January 2017, the Malaysian government decided to stop allowing North Korean state airline Air Koryo access to the country following the implementation of recent United Nations Security Council sanctions due to pressure from the United States. By September 2017, Malaysian Sarawak State Immigration Department confirmed there are no more North Koreans working in Sarawak with the mine where they worked having ceased operations. The Malaysian government currently bans its citizens from travelling to North Korea.

== See also ==
- Koreans in Malaysia
