= List of ambassadors of Malaysia to North Korea =

Ambassador of Malaysia to North Korea
- Incumbent; Vacant
- Style: His Excellency
- Seat: Pyongyang, North Korea
- Appointer: Yang di-Pertuan Agong
- Inaugural holder: Md. Yusoff Md. Zain
- Formation: 28 February 2004
- Website: www.kln.gov.my/web/prk_pyongyang/home

The ambassador of Malaysia to the Democratic People's Republic of Korea is the head of Malaysia's diplomatic mission to North Korea. The position has the rank and status of an ambassador extraordinary and plenipotentiary and is based in the Embassy of Malaysia, Pyongyang. The position has been vacant since 2017, after relations between the two countries turned hostile in the aftermath of the assassination of Kim Jong-nam at Kuala Lumpur International Airport.

== List of heads of mission ==
=== Ambassadors to North Korea ===
Ambassador	Term start	Term end
Md. Yusoff Md. Zain	28 February 2004	28 January 2006
Rahimi Harun	11 August 2008	28 February 2011
Mohamad Nizan Mohamad	5 June 2015	6 March 2017

== See also ==
- Malaysia–North Korea relations
