= Saffa =

Saffa or SAFFA may refer to:

- Saffa, Ramallah, a Palestinian town in the West Bank
- Schweizerische Ausstellung für Frauenarbeit or Swiss Exhibition for Women's Work, exhibitions held in Switzerland in 1928 and 1958
- Saffa, or saffer, a colloquial expression for a person who once was from South Africa now emigrated to another country.

== See also ==
- Safa (disambiguation)
- Saffer, a surname
