= Al-Safa =

Al-Safa (Arabic: الصفا Aṣ-Ṣafā) may refer to:

- Al-Safa (Syria), a hilly region in southern Syria
- Al-Safa and Al-Marwah, two small hills in Saudi Arabia
- Al-Safa FC, a Saudi Arabian football club based in Safwa City
- Al-Safa' SC, a Lebanese sports club based in Beirut
- Arab al-Safa, former Palestinian Bedouin village and clan in Beit She'an Valley in Ottoman Palestine (now Israel)

== See also ==
- Safa (disambiguation)
