= Air Koryo =

National airline of North Korea

Air Koryo 고려항공

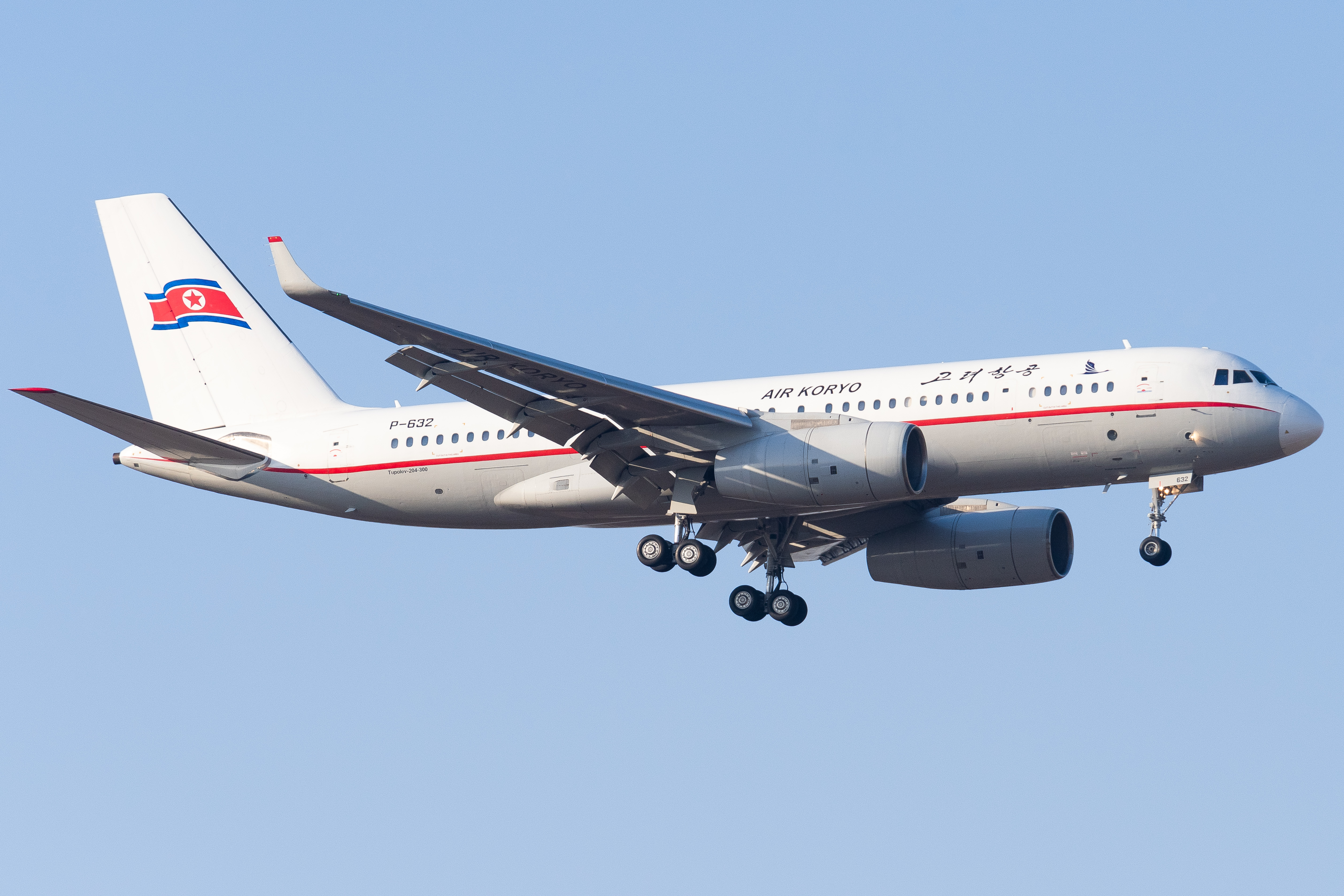
- An Air Koryo Tupolev Tu-204
IATA	ICAO	Call sign
JS	KOR	AIR KORYO
- Founded: 21 September 1955; 71 years ago (as Korean Airways)
- Hubs: Pyongyang International Airport
- Focus cities: Beijing, Shenyang, Vladivostok
- Fleet size: 6 (for international routes)
- Destinations: 4
- Parent company: National Aviation Administration of the DPRK
- Headquarters: Ryongbung-ri, Sunan District, Pyongyang, North Korea
- Key people: An Pyong-chil (Director of the General Bureau of Civil Aviation)
- Website: www.airkoryo.com.kp

- Air Koryo
- Hangul: 고려항공
- Hanja: 高麗航空
- RR: Goryeo hanggong
- MR: Koryŏ hanggong

Air Koryo (Korean: 고려항공, romanized: Goryeo Hanggong) is North Korea's flag carrier and only commercial airline. It is state-owned and controlled by the North Korean air force. Headquartered in Sunan-guyŏk, Pyongyang, it operates domestic and international routes – on a regular schedule only to Beijing, Shenyang, and Vladivostok – from its hub at Pyongyang's Sunan International Airport. It also operates flights on behalf of the North Korean government, with one of its aircraft serving as North Korean supreme leader Kim Jong Un's personal plane. Its small fleet consists of Ilyushin and Tupolev aircraft from the Soviet Union and Russia, and Antonovs from the Soviet Union and Ukraine.

The carrier's history can be traced to the founding of the Soviet–North Korean Airline (SOKAO) in 1950. Following the Korean War, in 1955, the airline was reorganized as Korean Airways and started domestic and international routes to other communist Eastern Bloc states in Asia and Europe. Another reorganization followed after the collapse of the Soviet Union, and in 1993, the airline adopted its current name, Air Koryo. Due to its aging fleet of Soviet aircraft and related safety and maintenance concerns, Air Koryo was banned in the European Union between 2006 and 2020, when it was allowed to resume operations into the EU with their newly acquired Tu-204 aircraft.

In recent years the airline has also begun branching out into commercial sectors beyond aviation, such as ground transportation and consumer goods. Regular operations were suspended during the COVID-19 pandemic, with no scheduled international flights between 2020 and 2023.

== History ==
=== Early years ===
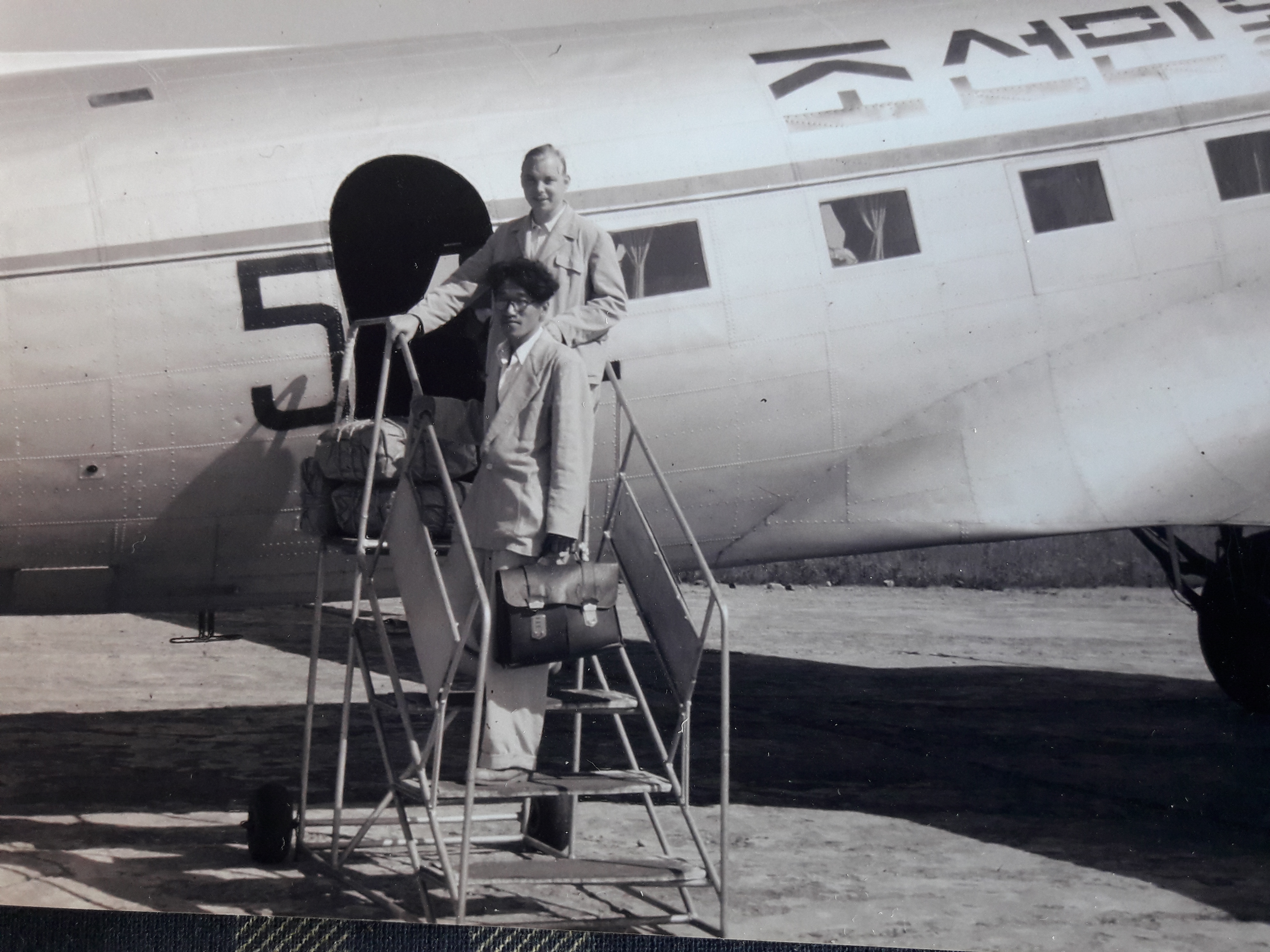
Korean Airways aircraft with German Working Group Hamhung staff (1958)

Korean Airways logo

SOKAO (Soviet–Korean Airline, 소련-조선항공; 蘇聯-朝鮮航空; Soryŏn-Chosŏn hanggong) was established as a joint North Korean-Soviet venture in early 1950 to connect Pyongyang with Moscow. Regular flights began that same year. Services were suspended during the Korean War, resuming in 1953 under the name Ukamps run by the North Korean Bureau of Civil Aviation, Ministry of Transport with service between Pyongyang, Beijing, and Shenyang. The state airline was then placed under the control of the Civil Aviation Administration of Korea (CAAK) and re-branded Korean Airways (조선민항; 朝鮮民航; Chosŏn minhang), starting operations on 21 September 1955 with Lisunov Li-2, Antonov An-2 and Ilyushin Il-12 aircraft. Ilyushin Il-14s and Ilyushin Il-18s were added to the fleet in the 1960s.

=== Expansion ===
North Korea, along with some of the Warsaw nations reportedly expressed interest when the Soviet Tu-104 was introduced in 1956, even ordering a demonstration flight to Pyongyang that year. However, such an advanced and expensive type was not suitable for the nation's economic conditions at that time. Jet operations commenced two decades later in 1975 when the first Tupolev Tu-154 was delivered for service from Pyongyang to Prague, East Berlin, and Moscow with refueling stops in Irkutsk and Novosibirsk, as the Tu-154 had insufficient range. Tu-134s and An-24s were also delivered to start domestic services. From 1969 until the later 1980s, China had no direct flights to the USSR and vice-versa as a result of the Sino-Soviet Split. The occasional official travellers between the superpowers often transited through Pyongyang, served by both Aeroflot and CAAC. The regime took advantage of Pyongyang's position of being the most practical transit point as the only airport in the world that had flights both to China and the USSR, charging exorbitant landing fees for these airlines. The Tu-154 fleet was increased at the start of the 1980s, while the first long-haul Ilyushin Il-62 was delivered back in 1979 (two of these aircraft are used in VIP configuration), allowing Korean Airways to offer a direct non-stop service to Moscow for the first time, as well as serving Sofia and Belgrade.

Alongside Soviet aircraft, North Korea also considered acquiring Concorde supersonic jets for Korean Airways under a plan by Kim Il Sung to boost the country's international prestige. North Korea and Aérospatiale and British Aerospace – Concorde's two European manufacturers – signed a preliminary purchase agreement with the country for two Concordes in 1979, but the deal never proceeded because of North Korea's economic challenges and Cold War tensions between East and West. The original plan was to acquire the Tu-144 from friendly USSR, and Chosonminhang pilots were flown to Russia to begin training for the type. However Soviet aviation authorities were hesitant to allow the sale to proceed due to fear of compromising sensitive military technology and refused to build their order. Korean Airways was the only foreign airline who expressed interest in China's failed Y-10 passenger liner during the early '80s, believing it to be a cheaper alternative to Soviet transports. During the 1990s, in an effort to boost relations with the US manufacturing/engineering industry following the massive Agreed Framework, Korean Airways attempted to purchase McDonnell Douglas MD-80 based passenger liners to replace its ageing Tu-134 fleet for intermediate international flights, forging very good relations with the aerial giant. The deal went so far that Korean Airways decided to place the MD-82 as a fleet member on one of its brochures in 1996, but pressure from MD shareholders and senior US government officials forced the cancellation of the deal.

The end of the Cold War and the collapse of communism in Eastern Europe saw a vast reduction in the number of international services offered. The service to Sofia was discontinued in 1998, as were those to Berlin and Moscow in 2002, marking an end to scheduled services to Europe. Korean Airways re-branded as Air Koryo on 28 March 1992, and in 1993, ordered three Ilyushin Il-76 freight aircraft to carry cargo to and from its destinations in China and Russia.

=== 21st century ===
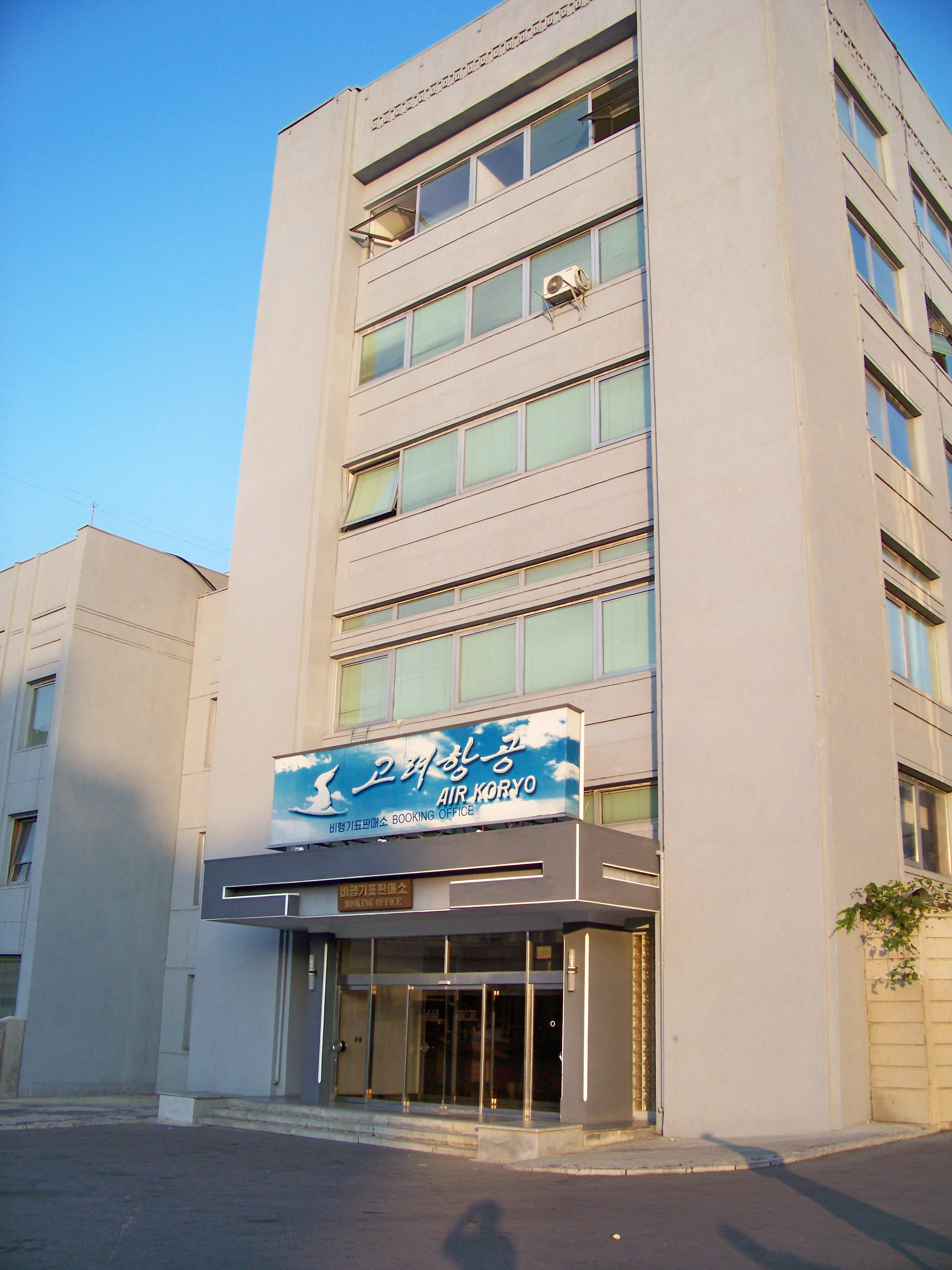
Air Koryo office in Pyongyang

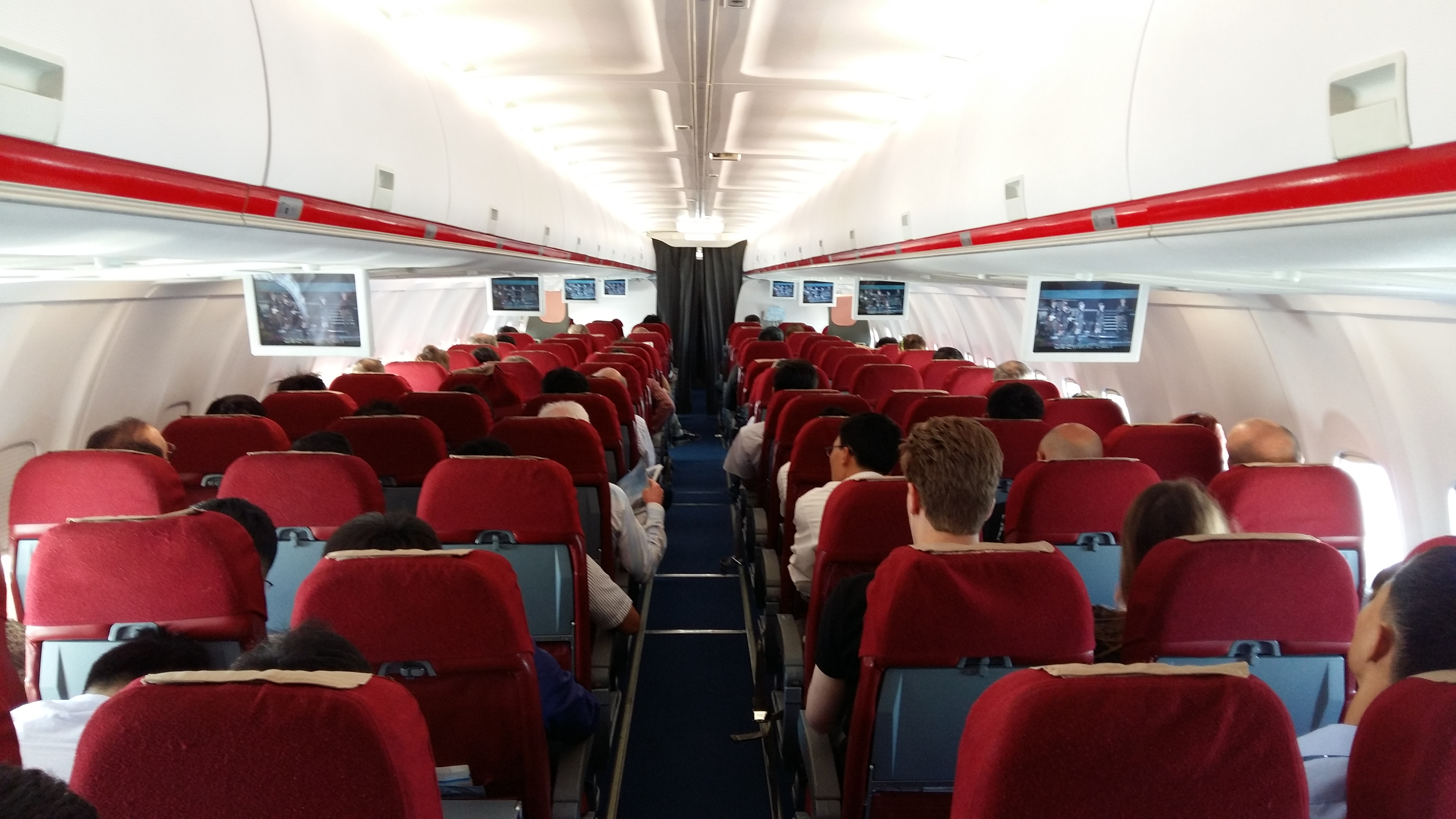
Interior of an Air Koryo Tupolev Tu-204

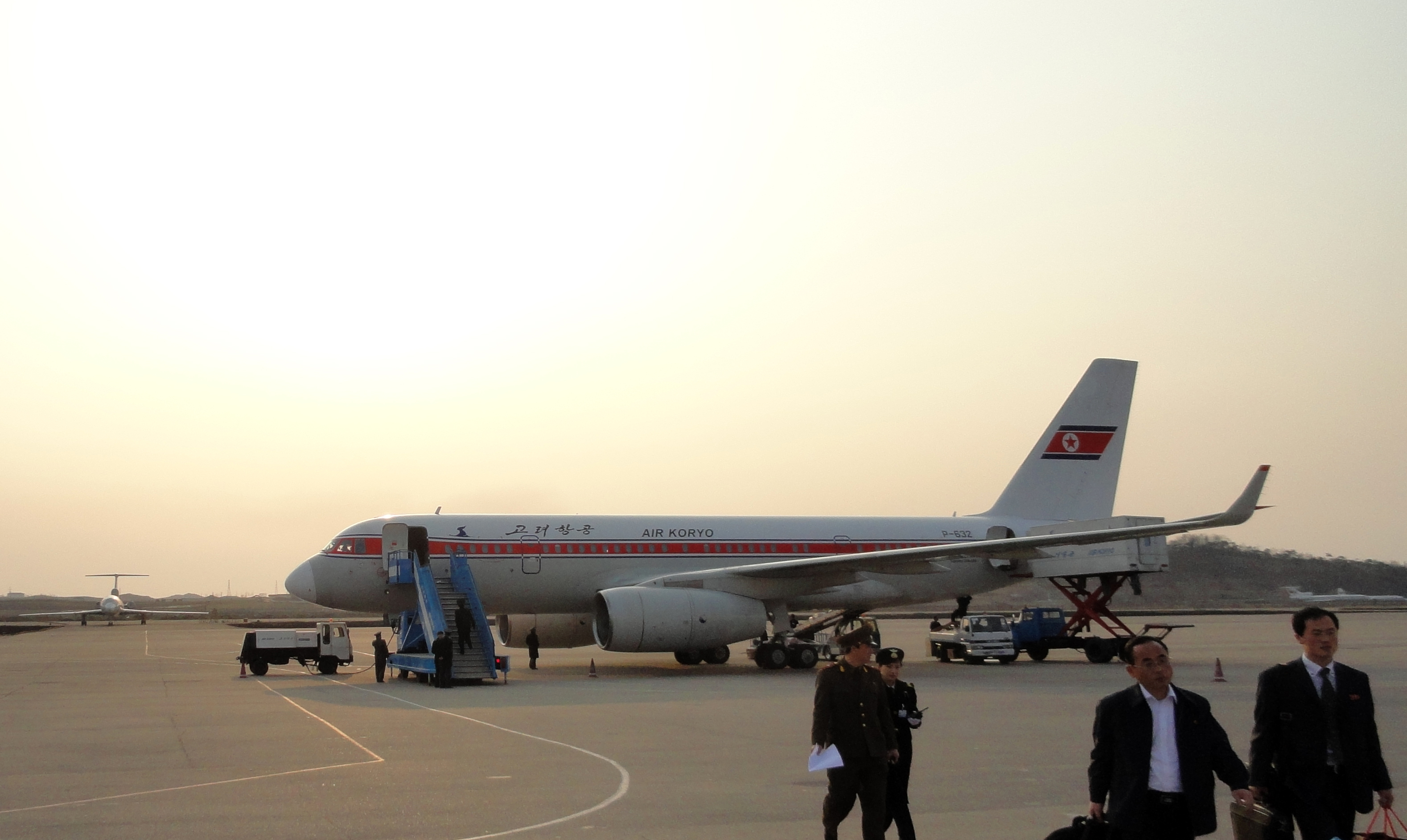
Air Koryo Tupolev Tu-204 at Pyongyang International Airport

Air Koryo purchased a Tupolev Tu-204-300 aircraft in December 2007 and another in March 2010 to replace its aging international fleet. With the Tu-204, Air Koryo would be able to fly to Europe.

Due to safety and maintenance concerns, Air Koryo was added to the list of air carriers banned in the European Union in March 2006. The European Commission found evidence of serious safety deficiencies on the part of Air Koryo during ramp inspections in France and Germany. Air Koryo persistently failed to address these issues during other subsequent ramp inspections performed by the EU under the SAFA programme, pointing to blatant systemic safety deficiencies at Air Koryo operations. The airline failed to reply to an inquiry by the French Civil Aviation Authority regarding its safety operations, pointing to a lack of transparency or communication on the part of Air Koryo. The plan by Air Koryo for corrective action, presented in response to France's request, was found to be inadequate and insufficient. The EC also held that North Korean authorities did not adequately oversee the flag carrier, which it was obliged to do under the Chicago Convention. Therefore, on the basis of the common criteria, the Commission assessed that Air Koryo did not meet the relevant safety standards.

In September 2009, Air Koryo ordered an additional Tupolev Tu-204-300 and a single Tupolev Tu-204-100. Air Koryo was to receive its first of two Tupolev Tu-204-100B aircraft fitted with 210 seats. Flights to Dalian in China were added to the Air Koryo schedule. Also, twice weekly Tu-134 flights from Pyongyang and direct services from Pyongyang to Shanghai Pudong were inaugurated with a two weekly service on JS522 and returning on JS523 in 2010.

In March 2010, Air Koryo was allowed to resume operations into the EU only with their Tu-204 aircraft, which were fitted with the necessary equipment to comply with mandatory international standards. In April 2011, Air Koryo launched its first services to Malaysia with the inauguration of flights from Pyongyang to Kuala Lumpur. The flights operated twice a week utilizing the Tu-204, but were cancelled in mid-2017 due to sanctions imposed resulting from the poisoning murder of Kim Jong-nam at Kuala Lumpur International Airport by suspected North Korean agents.

In 2011, Air Koryo also inaugurated services to Kuwait City, being operated weekly by Tu-204 aircraft. The services operate during peak travel season – April to October.

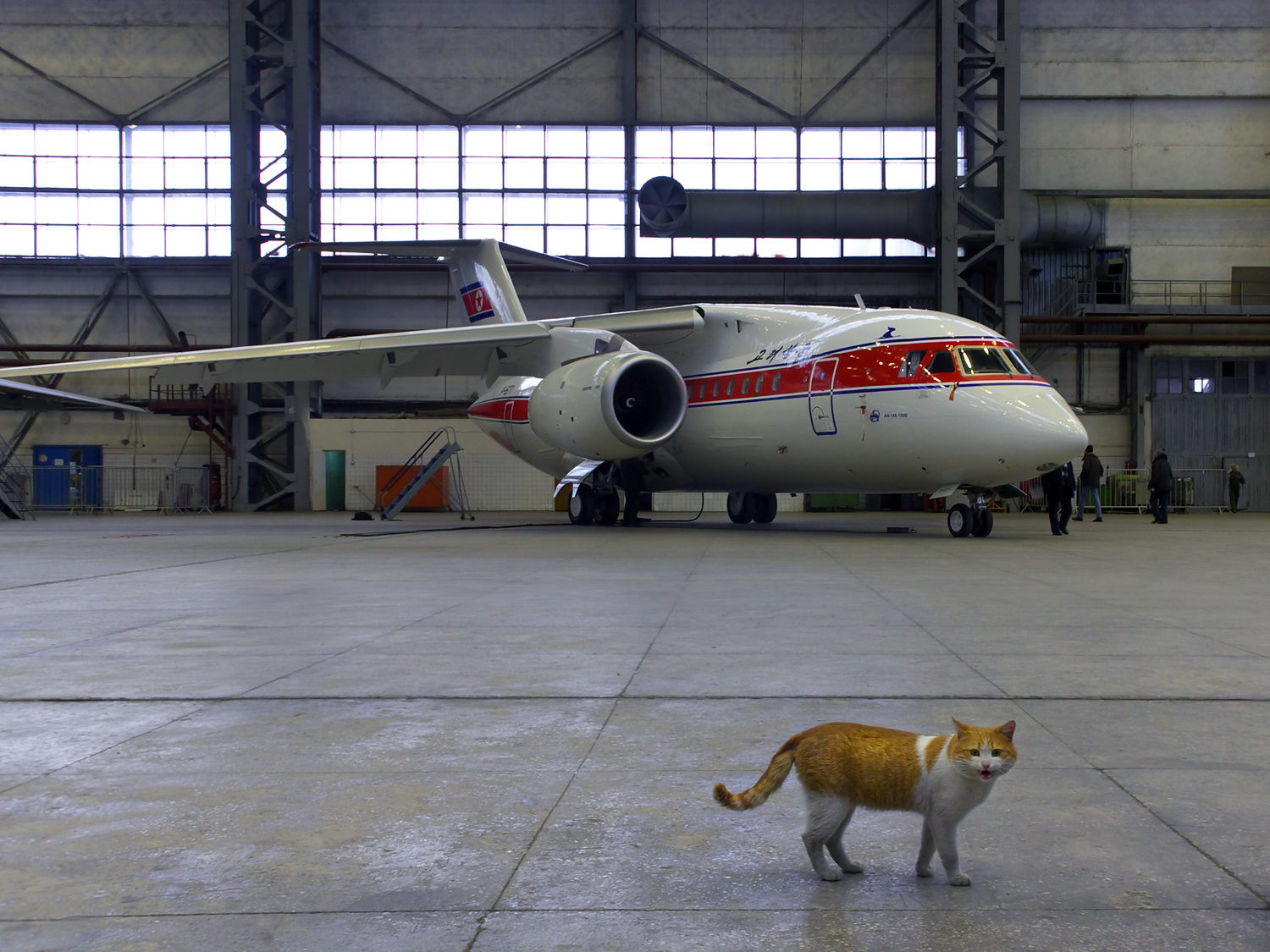
Antonov-148-100B

In 2012, Air Koryo resumed flights to Kuala Lumpur but ceased the service in 2014 along with its expansion into Harbin, China. In 2012, Juche Travel Services, a company operating tours to North Korea, launched "aviation enthusiast" tours using chartered Air Koryo aircraft, which offered visitors the chance to fly on every type of Air Koryo aircraft within North Korea, the Mil-17, An-24, Tu-134, Tu-154, and Il-62. The international services were operated by An-148, Tu-154, or Tu-204.

In 2017, there were signs that Air Koryo was branching out into commercial sectors beyond aviation, providing goods and services as diverse as petrol stations, taxis, tobacco, soft drinks, and tinned pheasant meat.

As of 2021, two further Tupolev Tu-204-100B aircraft were allegedly prepared to be leased to Air Koryo. However, both have since been sighted with the name of Sky KG Airlines added on top of Air Koryo's colors and have been moved to Zhukovsky International Airport by Moscow, where they remain as of November 2023. Intelligence and media reports suggest that North Korea might still be trying to acquire these two jets with Russian assistance as of November 2023.

=== COVID-19 pandemic ===
Air Koryo was severely affected by the COVID-19 pandemic. On 24 January 2020, the airline canceled several flights to China – to Macao, Shanghai, and Shenyang – and on 1 February canceled its two remaining international routes to Beijing and Vladivostok. International flights remained canceled through August 2023, flying anew on 22 August to Beijing and on 25 August to Vladivostok using Tu–204 aircraft.

The company flew to neighboring China to collect COVID-19-related supplies.

== Destinations ==
Scheduled international services are only operated from Pyongyang to Beijing, Shenyang, and Vladivostok. Additional destinations not listed on their website are noted elsewhere as charters or seasonal services.

The first regular charter flights between North Korea and South Korea began in 2003. The first Air Koryo flight operated by a Tu-154 touched down at Seoul's Incheon International Airport. Air Koryo operated 40 return services to Seoul, along with flights into Yangyang and Busan in South Korea. Inter-Korean charters from Hamhung's Sondok Airport to Yangyang International in South Korea began in 2002. There are currently no inter-Korean flights, due to laws in both countries. The airline operated a series of services to Seoul Incheon International Airport with Tu-204 and An-148 aircraft for the 2014 Asian Games held in Incheon.

Air Koryo operated an airline interline partnership with Aeroflot, which was then part of SkyTeam, on services radiating from Vladivostok and Pyongyang until 2017, when it was forced to close the agreement due to newly imposed sanctions.

== Fleet ==
=== Current fleet ===
As of August 2025, Air Koryo operates the following fleet for international routes:

Air Koryo fleet
Aircraft	In service	Orders	Passengers			Notes
Aircraft	In service	Orders	C	Y	Total	Notes
Antonov An-148-100B	2	—	8	62	70	Original order in 2013 was for two An-148s and one An-158.
Ilyushin Il-62	2	—	VIP			Operated for the Government of North Korea. One plane in all-white livery used as personal transport for Kim Jong Un.
Tupolev Tu-154B	1	—	16	120	136	Operating as flight JS271 to Vladivostok.
Tupolev Tu-204-100B	1	—	12	210	222	Former Red Wings Airlines aircraft acquired through a shell company.
Tupolev Tu-204-300	1	—	8	136	142	This particular aircraft was converted from a Tu-204-100.
Total	6	—				

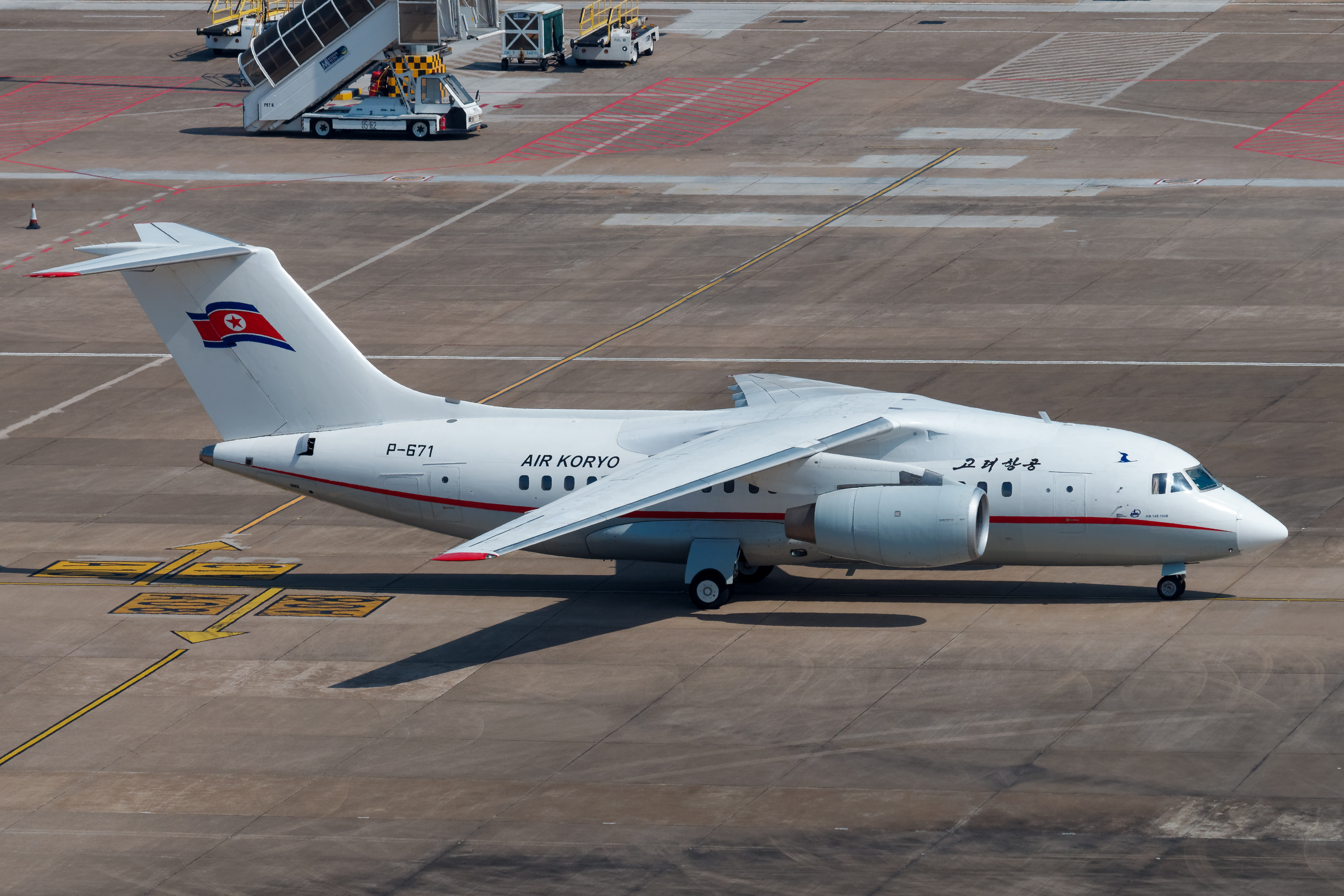
Antonov An-148-100B

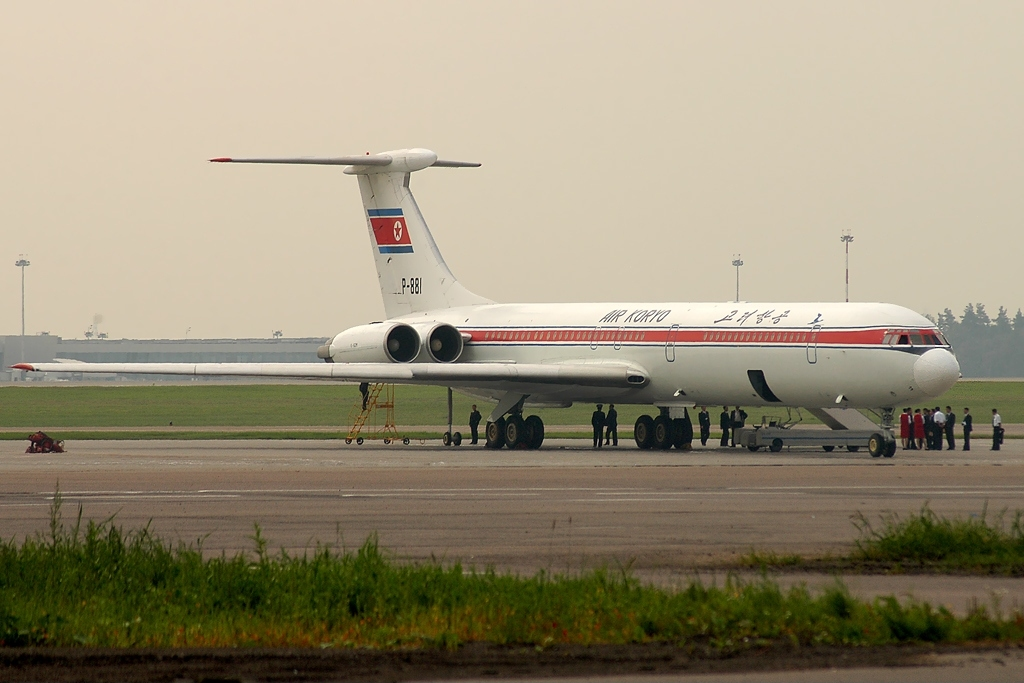
Ilyushin Il-62M

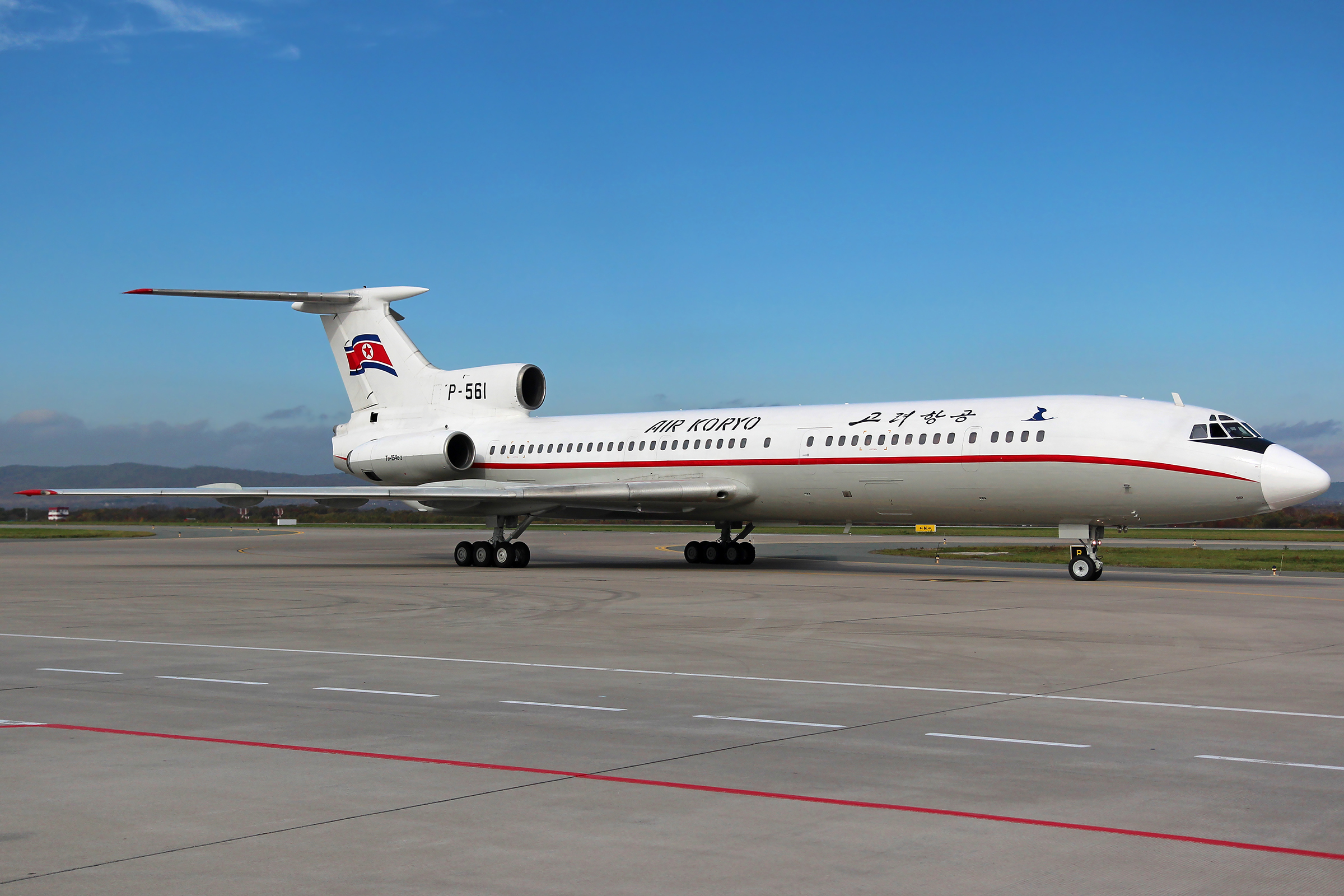
Tupolev TU-154B

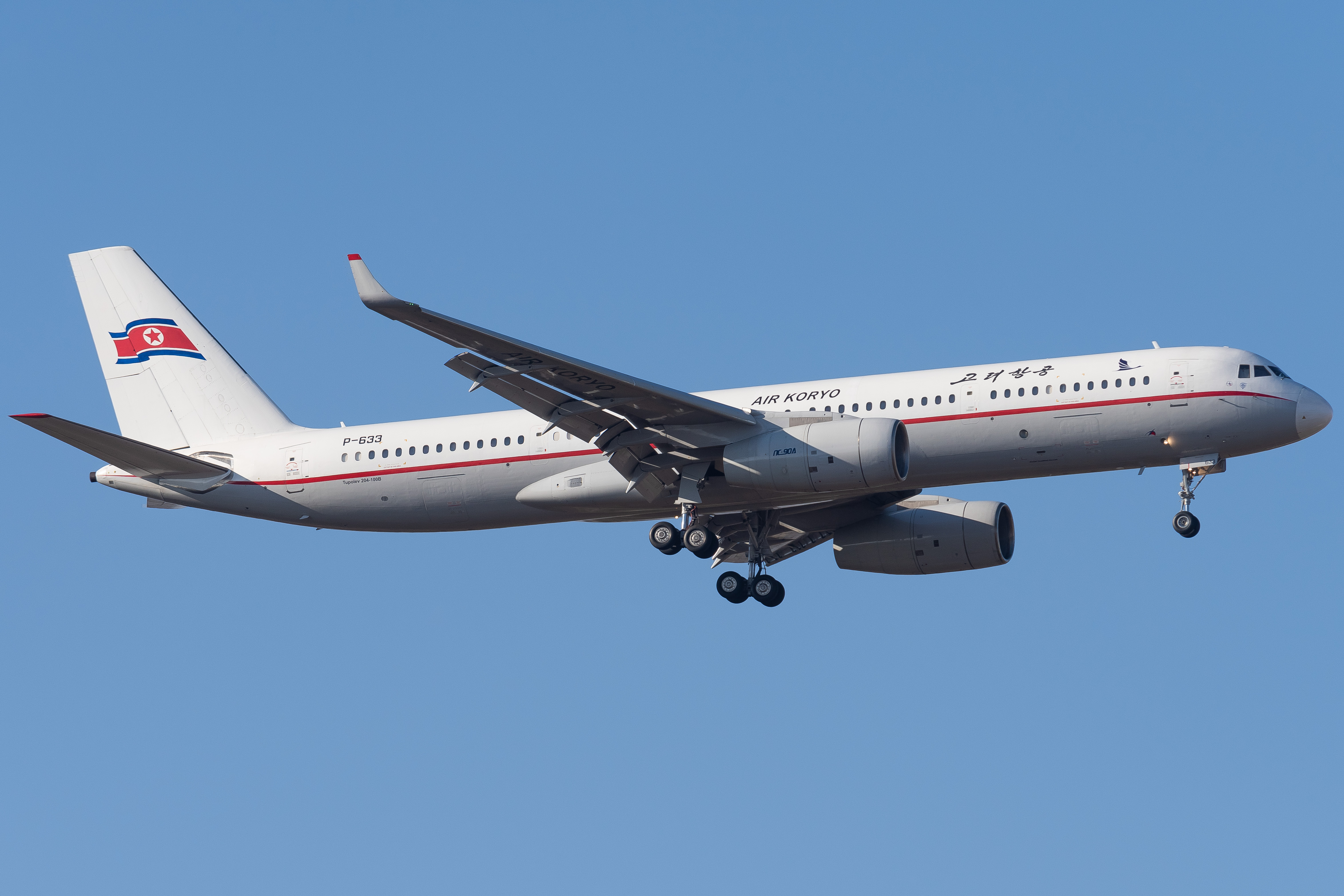
Tupolev TU-204-100B

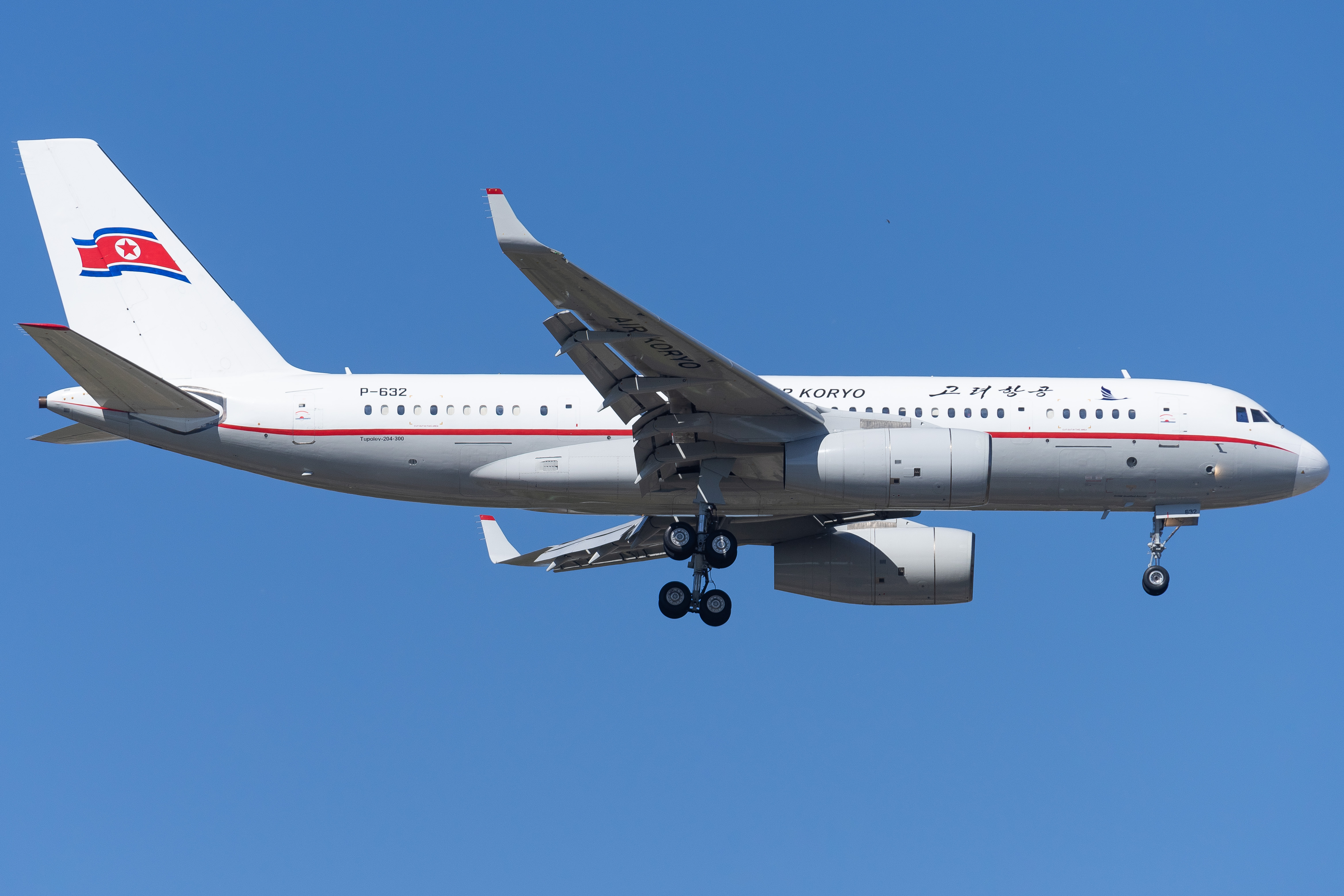
Tupolev TU-204-300

=== Historic, domestic routes fleet and unknown status ===
Aircraft	In service	Inactive	Notes
Antonov An-24	4	2	
Ilyushin Il-18	1	1	One remains in service, the last Il-18 in passenger operations worldwide.
Ilyushin Il-76	3	0	
Tupolev Tu-134	2	0	
Tupolev Tu-154	1	2	One remains in service. One was reportedly retired in 2010, but had been repainted and returned to service in 2013; in storage since 2019. The third was retired in 2010 and is now at the Aviation Institute in the Son Yang district.

Air Koryo may have been planning to add either a Ilyushin Il-86 or Ilyushin Il-96 to its fleet, according to a 1993 timetable.

=== Tupolev Tu-204 ===
The first Tupolev Tu-204-300 for Air Koryo was officially handed over to the carrier on 27 December 2007, and was ferried from Ulyanovsk to Pyongyang. It has been fitted out with 16 business class seats and the remaining 150 seats are economy. The Tu-204 aircraft are currently scheduled on all international flights out of Pyongyang. With the arrival of the new aircraft, a new seasonal route to Singapore was introduced and the Pyongyang-Bangkok route was resumed in 2008. Its first revenue-earning flight was made on 8 May 2008. Air Koryo operates another version of the Tu-204 jet, a Tu-204-100B, which they took delivery of in March 2010. The Tu-204-300 is a shortened version of the Tu-204-100B. It started operating scheduled services on 5 March 2010. The two Tupolev Tu-204 were given the rights to operate into the European Union in March 2010, and remain the only planes the airline is allowed to operate to the EU.

=== Gallery ===
Antonov An-148

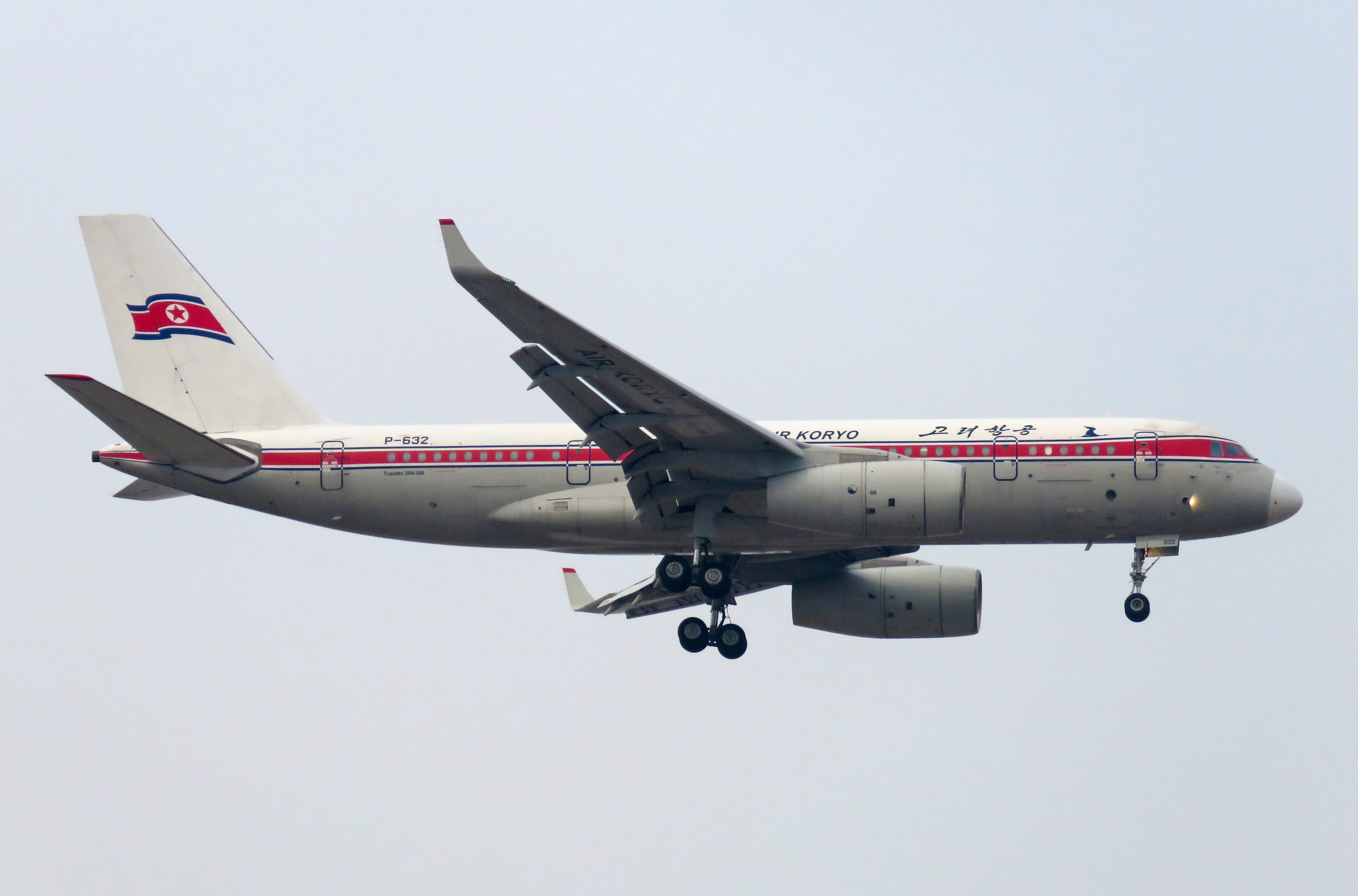
Tupolev Tu-204

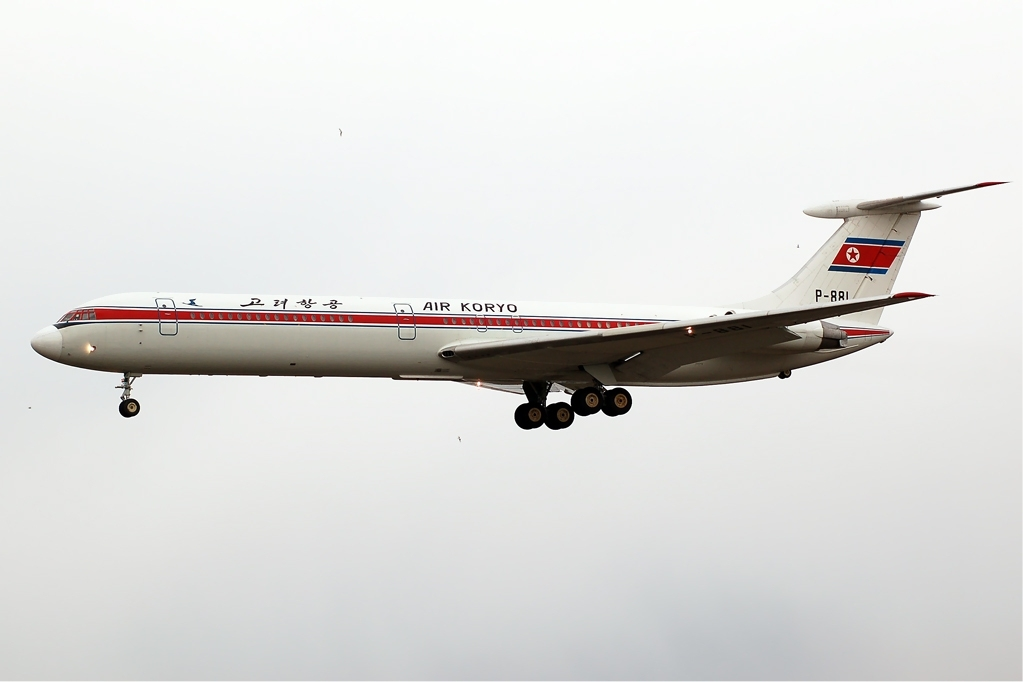
Ilyushin Il-62M

== Livery ==
The Air Koryo livery originally consisted of a white and grey fuselage and a horizontal stripe in national colors along the windows dividing the upper and lower parts into white and grey respectively. The Korean name Air Koryo is painted above the windows and a North Korean flag is painted on the vertical stabilizer.

Now most of their planes are painted in new livery. It consists of a full white body and grey belly which are divided with a thin red stripe. The name of the airline is painted in Korean in front and in English in the middle with the North Korean flag and registration on the vertical stabilizer.

Following Kim Jong Un's announcement at the end of 2023 that North Korea will no longer seek reunification with South Korea, the carrier changed its crane logo in 2024. The old logo was a stylized crane whose wings resembled the Korean Peninsula as a unified whole, while the crane wings of the new logo consist of tapered horizontal lines that no longer resemble the peninsula.

== Accidents and incidents ==
- On 30 June 1979, a Korean Airways Tupolev Tu-154B sustained landing gear and wing damage at Budapest Ferihegy Airport in Hungary. On final approach to Runway 31, the pilot realised the plane would undershoot and brought the nose of the plane up without applying power. The aircraft stalled, and with a hard landing, the right landing gear collapsed, causing the right wing to strike the ground and sustain substantial wing structure damage. There were no fatalities, and aircraft P-551 was subsequently repaired and returned to service.
- On 1 July 1983, a CAAK Ilyushin Il-62M on a non-scheduled international passenger flight from Pyongyang, North Korea (Pyongyang Sunan International Airport) to Conakry, Guinea (Conakry International Airport) crashed in the Fouta Djallon Mountains in Guinea. All 23 people on board died, and the aircraft was written off.
- On 15 August 2006, Flight 152, a Tupolev Tu-154B (P-551) suffered a runway excursion while landing at Beijing Capital International Airport. Despite being officially retired in 2010, it was repainted and returned to service in 2013 and as of 2019 has been in storage. Previously, in 1976, this aircraft had been taxiing when it was damaged by an Aeroflot Tu-104 that lost control and crashed during takeoff.
- On 22 July 2016, Flight 151, a Tupolev Tu-204-300 on a flight from Beijing to Pyongyang, made an emergency landing at Shenyang Taoxian International Airport due to reports of smoke in the cabin. The oxygen masks were deployed.

== Bibliography ==
- Davies, R. E. G. (1997). Airlines of Asia: Since 1920. London: Putnam. ISBN 978-0-85177-855-6. Archived from the original on 16 September 2023.
- "Air Koryo". IATA.org. IATA. 13 January 2023.
- Haynes, Thomas (20 November 2020). "The only airline in North Korea". Key.Aero. Key Publishing Ltd. Archived from the original on 20 November 2020.
- Morris, Hugh; Smith, Oliver (13 June 2018). "Private jets of world leaders: Kim Jong-un's Soviet-era plane, Donald Trump's Air Force One". The Sydney Morning Herald. Nine Entertainment Co.
- O'Carroll, Chad (6 June 2017). "N. Korean airline introduces tinned pheasant line, opens Pyongyang shop". NK News. Archived from the original on 14 April 2019.
- O'Carroll, Chad (17 November 2019). "Kim Jong Un's personal jet makes first appearance since Singapore summit". NK News. Korea Risk Group. Archived from the original on 6 October 2023.
- Petchenik, Ian (29 March 2020) [11 June 2018]. "How Kim Jong Un and the North Korean Delegation Traveled to the Singapore Summit". Flightradar24. Flightradar24 AB. Archived from the original on 5 October 2023.
- Sokolin, Anton (25 August 2023a). "North Korean airline operates first flight to Vladivostok since pandemic began". NK News. Korea Risk Group. Archived from the original on 25 February 2024.
- Sokolin, Anton (14 December 2023b). "North Korean carrier flies to China's Shenyang for first time in four years". NK News. Korea Risk Group. Archived from the original on 14 December 2023.
- United Nations Panel of Experts (6 March 2014). Report of the Panel of Experts established pursuant to resolution 1874 (2009) (PDF) (Report). United Nations Security Council. 14-23227.
- "World Airlines Survey". Flight International. 13 April 1961. Archived from the original on 6 October 2014.
- "World Airlines Survey". Flight International. IPC Transport Press Limited. 10 April 1969. Archived from the original on 21 December 2016.
- Zwirko, Colin (3 November 2023). Betts, Bryan (ed.). "Pyongyang airport expands plane parking amid claims Air Koryo seeks new aircraft". NK News. Korea Risk Group. Archived from the original on 3 November 2023.
