= Sky KG Airlines =

Airline of Kyrgyzstan

IATA	ICAO	Call sign
Y3	KGK	KYRGYZ SKY
- Founded: 2004
- Ceased operations: December 30, 2021
- Hubs: Manas International Airport
- Fleet size: 3
- Headquarters: Bishkek, Kyrgyzstan
- Website: skykgairlines.com

Sky KG Airlines was a charter airline and aviation service provider headquartered in Bishkek, Kyrgyzstan.

== Fleet ==
As of September 2020, the airline's fleet consisted of the following aircraft:

- 1 Boeing 747-400
- 2 Tupolev Tu-204 - both aircraft were reportedly acquired to be transferred to Air Koryo, but never entered service with either company.

== See also ==
- List of defunct airlines of Kyrgyzstan
