= Saffer =

Saffer is a German language topographic surname denoting someone living in a humid lowland (South German saff: "damp depression"). Alternatively it may be a nickname for a greedy person (Old French saffre "glutton") in English-speaking populations or a variant of the Ashkenazic surname Safir (ornamental name from northeastern Yiddish dialect safir "sapphire"). Notable people with that name include:

- Junior Saffer (1918–1982), American basketball player
