= Assassination of Kim Jong-nam =

2017 murder in Kuala Lumpur, Malaysia

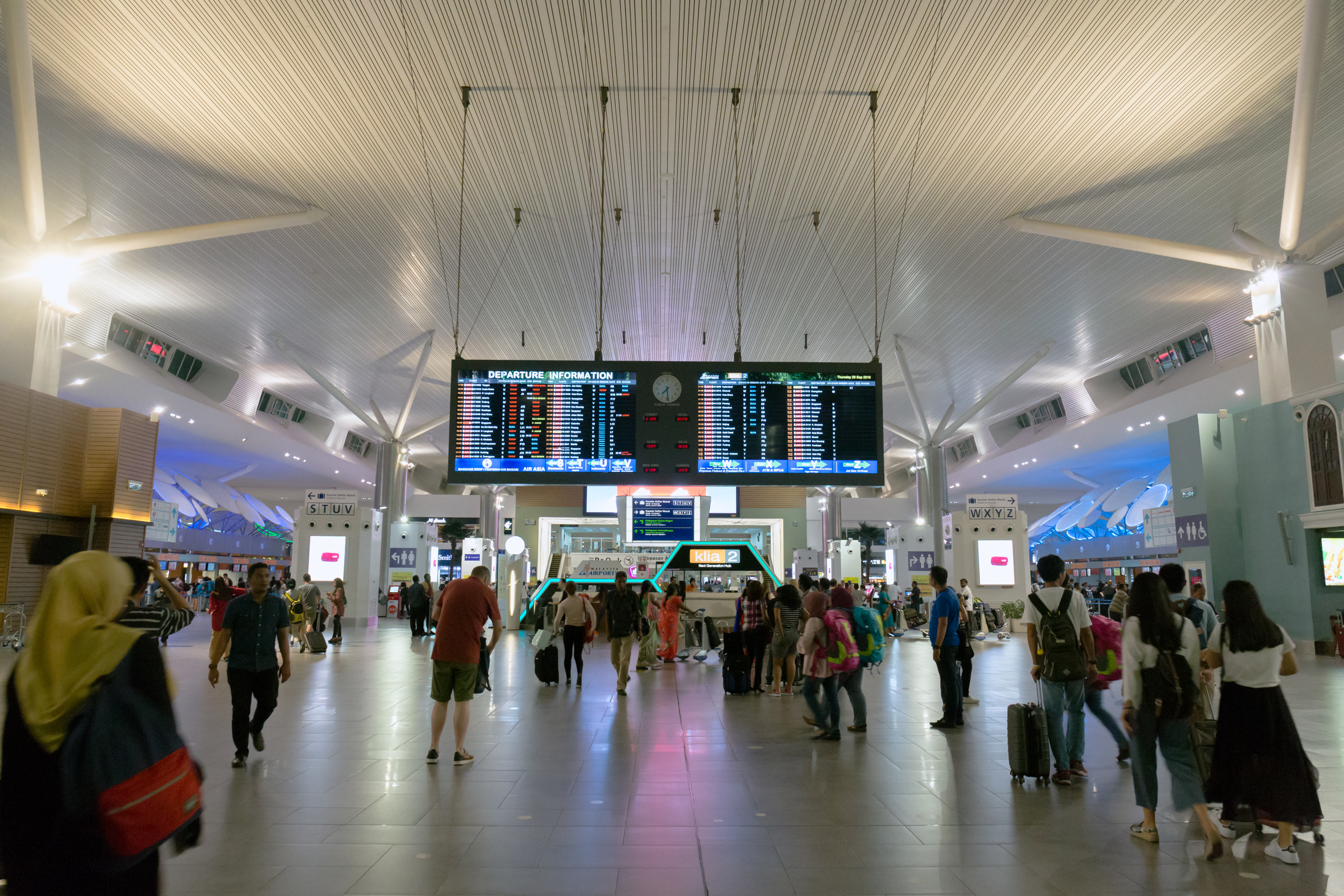
- KLIA2 main lobby; pictured in September 2016, the site of Kim Jong-nam's assassination
- Location: 2°44′35″N 101°41′10″E; Kuala Lumpur International Airport 2, Malaysia
- Date: 13 February 2017
- Target: Kim Jong-nam
- Attack type: Nerve Agent Poisoning
- Weapon: VX nerve agent
- Perpetrators: North Korea (alleged); Siti Aisyah; Đoàn Thị Hương
- Motive: Unknown (Suspected state-sponsored political execution)
- Accused: North Korea
- Charges: N/A
- Convictions: One convicted of "voluntarily causing injuries by dangerous weapons or means"

On 13 February 2017, Kim Jong-nam, the older half-brother of the North Korean leader Kim Jong Un, was assassinated at Kuala Lumpur International Airport in Malaysia. He had been living abroad since his exile from North Korea in 2003.

Following his visit to the resort island Langkawi, Kim Jong-nam arrived at terminal 2 sometime before 9:00 a.m. to take a 10:50 a.m. AirAsia flight to Macau. At approximately 9:00 a.m., two women approached Kim with separate components of the VX nerve agent on their hands, combining it into the lethal weapon when touching his face. He died about 15 to 20 minutes later while being transported to the hospital.

The women were identified as Siti Aisyah from Indonesia and Đoàn Thị Hương from Vietnam. Both were charged with the murder of Kim Jong-nam. The murder charges were dropped when it was found that they were unknowingly used for the assassination, although Hương pled guilty to a lesser charge of "voluntarily causing hurt by dangerous weapons or means" and received a sentence of three years and four months. She was released from prison on 3 May 2019.

It is widely believed that Kim Jong-nam was murdered on the orders of Kim Jong Un. Four North Korean suspects, later confirmed as spies, left the airport shortly after the assassination and reached Pyongyang without being arrested. Other North Koreans were arrested but were released without charge. The assassination triggered a serious diplomatic conflict between Malaysia and North Korea, which ended in the two countries severing diplomatic ties.

== Attack ==
Kim Jong-nam arrived in Malaysia on 6 February 2017, traveling to the resort island of Langkawi on 8 February. On 13 February, at about 9 a.m., he was approached by two women, one of whom was Vietnamese while the other was Indonesian, and ambushed with VX nerve agent near an airport self check-in kiosk at level 3, departure hall in KLIA 2, the low-cost carrier terminal at Kuala Lumpur International Airport while waiting for a 10:50 a.m. AirAsia flight to Macau. VX is a chemical weapon banned by the Chemical Weapons Convention of 1993. North Korea, which has not ratified the convention, is suspected of holding a stockpile.

Malaysian police said that Kim had alerted an airport receptionist, saying that "someone had grabbed him from behind and splashed a liquid on his face" and a woman "covered his face with a cloth laced with a liquid".

A resuscitation device was strapped to Kim's face, and he was then transported by stretcher through the airport to reach an ambulance. He was treated at the airport in the Menara Medical Clinic by nurse Rabiatul Adawiyah Mohd Sofi and Dr. Nik Mohd Adzrul Ariff Raja Azlan, who later testified that he was sweating, in pain and unresponsive. At the clinic, Kim was given 1 mg of atropine, and also adrenaline. He was given tracheal intubation. He died about 15 to 20 minutes after the attack while being transferred from the airport to the Putrajaya Hospital.

As he was traveling under the pseudonym "Kim Chol", Malaysian officials did not immediately formally confirm that Kim Jong-nam was the man killed. Kim's extensive Facebook use under this pseudonym since at least 2010, and use of commercial email services for communications, may have made it easier for North Korean agents to seek his whereabouts and track his movements. At the time of his death, Kim's backpack contained approximately $100,000 in cash and he was carrying four North Korean passports, all bearing the name Kim Chol.

== Perpetrators ==
On 15 February, Malaysian police arrested 28-year-old Vietnamese woman Đoàn Thị Hương at Kuala Lumpur International Airport in connection with the attack. Hương was identified through CCTV footage. On 16 February, a 25-year-old Indonesian woman named Siti Aisyah (born 11 February 1992) was arrested and identified as the second female suspect. Aisyah's boyfriend, a 26-year-old Malaysian named Muhammad Farid bin Jalaluddin, (Note: Alternatively transliterated as Muhammad Farid Jalaluddin.) was also arrested on 16 February to assist in the investigation.

Hương told the police that she was instructed by four men who were traveling with them to spray Kim with an unidentified liquid while Aisyah held and covered his face with a handkerchief as part of a prank. CCTV footage showed that Hương and Aisyah rushed to separate restrooms after carrying out the attack, and that they headed to the airport taxi stand after leaving the restrooms. Hương was seen leaving the airport by taxi at around 9:30 a.m. Hương claimed that after she returned to look for the others, they had disappeared and thus she decided to head back to the airport.

On 17 February, police arrested a 46-year-old North Korean man named Ri Jong-chol. He was described as an IT worker for Tombo Enterprise, living in Malaysia.

== International reactions ==
=== South Korea ===
Kim Myung-yeon, a spokesperson for South Korea's Liberty Korea Party, described the killing as a "naked example of Kim Jong-un's reign of terror." The South Korean government drew a parallel with the execution of Kim Jong-un's own uncle and others. The acting President of South Korea, Hwang Kyo-ahn, said that if the murder was confirmed to be masterminded by North Korea, that would clearly depict the brutality and inhumanity of the regime.

=== United States ===
North Korea was relisted as a state sponsor of terrorism by the United States on 20 November 2017, with the assassination cited as one of the reasons.

In March 2018, the United States Department of State imposed additional sanctions on North Korea, having asserted that North Korea used VX nerve agent to assassinate Kim Jong-nam.

On 10 June 2019, after the trial, The Wall Street Journal reported that former US officials stated Kim had been a CIA source. A book by Anna Fifield, The Washington Post bureau chief in Beijing, had earlier reported this, stating he had been previously filmed abroad with a US intelligence agent, and had carried a backpack that contained $120,000 in cash.

=== Apology from North Korean officials to Vietnam ===
On 12 December 2018, it was reported that North Korean officials had informally apologized to Vietnam for involving a Vietnamese woman in the assassination following Vietnam's demands for an official apology and threats to sever diplomatic ties.

=== Other reactions ===
The Executive Council of the Organisation for the Prohibition of Chemical Weapons (OPCW) expressed "grave concern" over the incident and called for those responsible for the use of chemical weapons to be held accountable.

== Autopsy ==
An autopsy was conducted despite North Korean diplomats objecting to any such procedure on Kim's body. Malaysian officials later commented that the autopsy proceeded as the North Korean diplomats failed to submit a formal protest. A post-mortem on Kim was conducted on 15 February at the Kuala Lumpur Hospital mortuary in the presence of several North Korean officials, and concluded the following day with formally confirming the identity of Kim's body. The autopsy was conducted by pathologist Mohamad Shah Mahmood of Kuala Lumpur Hospital, who testified that Kim's lungs, brain, liver and spleen were affected by the poison. A chemical pathologist testified that Kim's urine showed the effects of being exposed to the poison. Low levels of acetylcholinesterase indicated that Kim had been exposed to an insecticide or nerve agent. A forensic consultant testified that Kim's pupil constriction, and the feces in his underwear, suggested he had been poisoned.

On 24 February, Malaysia's police chief Khalid Abu Bakar announced that a post-mortem toxicology report had found traces of the nerve agent VX on Kim's face. According to experts, the use of VX may explain why two assailants were involved, because the assailants "could have wiped two or more precursors" in Kim's face. This is referred to as a binary chemical weapon. This method could ensure that the assailants were not themselves killed by the poison, which can be fatal in very small amounts; additionally, smuggling the chemical components into Malaysia separately could have helped avoid detection. Aisyah reported she vomited in the taxi afterward and has continued to feel unwell.

Two chemical weapons experts noted that the reported effects were not entirely consistent with the potency of VX—Kim was able to walk to the medical station without suffering spasms, paramedics were not affected, the assailants survived and there were no other reports of injury even though the scene of the attack was not cleaned for over a week. VX degrades rapidly in storage and North Korea's supplies are believed to be several years old, which could explain the apparent weakness of the chemical.

On 10 March, police completed the autopsy, confirming that the deceased was Kim Jong-nam based on DNA provided by his son Kim Han-sol, and the body was handed to the Ministry of Health for further action. The Health Ministry said they would then give Kim's family two to three weeks to claim his body, with the body having been embalmed to preserve it during the period. The family, however, declined to take the body and gave the Malaysian authorities permission to manage the remains. Over objections of Kim Han-sol, the body was flown to Pyongyang on 31 March. Kim Jong-nam's blazer, backpack and watch were initially submitted to a police chemistry department for analysis, but subsequently returned to officials from the North Korean embassy.

=== Diplomatic protest ===
Following Malaysia's refusal to release the body immediately, North Korea's ambassador Kang Chol accused Malaysia of collaborating with the country's enemies over the assassination of Kim Jong-nam. The ambassador said they would reject the outcome of the post-mortem conducted "on its citizen without permission" and perceived the decision as a "violation of human rights" and thus would lodge a complaint to the International Court of Justice (ICJ). The ambassador was summoned by the government of Malaysia on 20 February, while the Malaysian ambassador to North Korea was recalled.

The ambassador then responded that they could not trust the investigation conducted by the Malaysian police, noting there had been no evidence of the cause of death even a week after the attack. He also proposed that North Korea and Malaysia open a joint investigation together in order to prevent influence from South Korea which, he said, was trying to malign North Korea as the party responsible for the killing. Malaysian Prime Minister Najib Razak responded to the ambassador that his country would be objective during the investigation, rejecting the request for joint investigation. On 22 February, Malaysian police said there was evidence of an attempted break-in at the mortuary where Kim's body was being held.

The North Korean government rejected all findings, accused the Malaysian police of fabricating evidence in collusion with South Korea and demanded the release of the three people being held in connection with the death.

== North Korean–Malaysian dispute ==
On 28 February, the North Korean government dispatched a high level delegation to Malaysia. North Korea said the claim that VX nerve agent was used to kill one of its citizens was "absurd" and lacked scientific basis, portraying it as an allegation jointly made by the United States and South Korea to tarnish its image, adding that the death was caused by a "heart attack" as Kim Jong-nam had a record of heart disease. The North Koreans stressed that if it was indeed caused by the chemical, it should be proven by the Organisation for the Prohibition of Chemical Weapons. Malaysian police immediately rejected the North Korean claims. In a statement released by the Malaysian Foreign Ministry, the country said it was already co-operating with OPCW.

Malaysia announced that from 6 March they would cancel visa-free entry for North Koreans, citing "security issues". On 4 March, the North Korean ambassador Kang Chol was declared persona non grata and asked to leave within 48 hours with a similar move having been imposed by North Korea towards the Malaysian ambassador. The North Korean authorities also reacted on 7 March by barring all Malaysian citizens in North Korea from leaving. Malaysian authorities imposed reciprocal measures, prohibiting North Korean citizens from leaving Malaysia.

On 30 March, Malaysian Prime Minister Najib Razak said that all Malaysians in North Korea as well as North Koreans in Malaysia would be allowed to return to their home countries after the receipt of a letter from Kim's family requesting his remains be returned to North Korea.

=== Attempts to restore diplomatic relations ===
Following the 2018 North Korea–United States Summit held in Singapore on 12 June 2018, the new Malaysian-led government of Pakatan Harapan under Prime Minister Mahathir Mohamad said:

"the world should not treat North Korea leader Kim Jong-un with scepticism and instead learn from his new attitude towards bringing about peace".

In a joint press conference in Tokyo, Japan, he said: "We hoped for a successful outcome from the historic meeting", adding that "Malaysia will re-open their embassy in North Korea as an end to the diplomatic row over the assassination of Kim Jong-nam". On 13 February 2019, Mahathir said that Malaysia will settle its problem with North Korea soon after the 2019 North Korea–United States Vietnam Summit held in Hanoi, Vietnam on 27–28 February 2019 but after the changing of leadership, no major statement has been issued since.

== Further investigations ==
According to lead police investigator Wan Azirul Nizam Che Wan Aziz, Kim Jong-nam told a friend that he feared his life was in danger six months before the assassination.

One of the suspects, Siti Aisyah, had been in Malaysia at least a day before the attack, reportedly to celebrate her birthday with her friends. Aisyah was a divorced mother who worked as a spa masseuse in Kuala Lumpur. She regularly returned to Indonesia to meet her mother and son. She told her mother that she found a better job as an actor in prank videos for the Chinese market. After Hương and Aisyah were arrested, they claimed they thought they were participating in a prank. According to both suspects, they were told to play harmless tricks on people in the vicinity for a prank TV show, one target being Kim Jong-nam. They said they were promised US$100, but after losing contact with their handlers, they never received the money.

According to their lawyers, Hương was recruited in December 2016 in Hanoi, Vietnam, while Aisyah was recruited in January 2017 by a Malaysian scout working for the North Koreans. The women were handled by separate teams of North Korean men, who posed as being from Japan and China, one of the recruiters being Ri Ji-u. Since their recruitment, Aisyah had performed the prank on at least 10 occasions. She was flown to Phnom Penh to perform the prank three times with an offer of US$200, while Hương performed it four times in locations including the airport terminals and Mandarin Oriental hotel in Kuala Lumpur. The prank involved approaching unsuspecting men and putting hands on their faces or kissing them on the cheek, then apologising before running away. Then Ri Ji-u said that a new actress and actor would join them for the airport prank. He described the actor as a fat and bald man with a "black bag and jacket", matching Kim's description on the day of his death. The Malaysian police retrieved a photo of "James" from Siti Aisyah's phone. He was later identified as Ri Ji-u. The police searched for him, but he was already in the North Korean embassy.

On 19 February, Malaysian police named four more North Korean suspects. They were identified as Ri Ji-hyon (aged 33), Hong Song-hak (34), O Jong-gil (55) and Ri Jae-nam (57), all of whom left Malaysia after the attack, and the Malaysian police requested help from Interpol and other relevant authorities in tracking them. According to an unnamed source, the four suspects flew to Jakarta, Dubai and Vladivostok before reaching Pyongyang. Three other male North Korean suspects were still in Malaysia: Ri Ji-u, who had lived in Malaysia for three years; Kim Uk-il, an employee of Air Koryo; and Hyon Kwang-song, the second secretary at the North Korean embassy. These suspects had taken refuge in the North Korean embassy.

On 22 February, Malaysia Royal Police Chief Khalid Khalid Abu Bakar said that the killing was "a planned effort" and that the two women arrested had been trained to carry out the attack and had repeatedly rehearsed it together at Pavilion Kuala Lumpur and Kuala Lumpur City Centre (KLCC). Khalid also alleged that the women apparently knew they were handling poisonous substances. That same day, an unnamed Malaysian man believed to be a chemist was picked up by police during a raid on a condominium where he then led police to another condominium where various chemicals were seized.

On 28 February, both women were charged with murder, which carries a mandatory death sentence. A lawyer for Hương requested a second autopsy as he doubted Malaysian expertise, calling for experts from Japan and Iraq as well as pathologists from North Korea itself to be involved. The Malaysian police responded by telling the lawyer to appeal to the high court.

On 3 March, the only detained North Korean suspect, Ri Jong-chol, was released and deported due to lack of evidence. While in transit through China, he told the media that the Malaysian police threatened to hurt his family if he did not confess his involvement in the murder and said his arrest was part of a "conspiracy". Malaysian police strongly denied his allegation.

On 16 March, Interpol issued a red notice for the four North Korean suspects who had fled to Pyongyang. The three North Korean suspects, Ri Ji-u, Kim Uk-il and Hyon Kwang-song, who were holed up in the North Korean embassy in Malaysia, were released on 30 March and allowed to return home after investigators interviewed them and cleared them of any wrongdoing.

On 22 March, Yonhap News Agency released information stating that Ri Ji-hyon, one of the four suspects who left Malaysia after the attack (the man with a cap on the photo from the airport CCTV), is the son of former North Korean ambassador to Vietnam Ri Hong. From November 2009, he worked as a trainee diplomat in Hanoi for more than a year before becoming an interpreter for another few years. With his ability to converse fluently in the Vietnamese language, he was suspected of having seduced and lured the Vietnamese national Hương into a fake TV prank, making her believe that he was a rich South Korean man. On the request of the Judicial Authorities of Malaysia, Interpol had published a red notice for Ri Ji-hyon for his involvement in the murder plot.

According to the forensics investigation, Kim had a Dell laptop which had accessed data stored on a USB pen drive while he was in Langkawi, though the pen drive was not in his possession when he died.

== Murder trial ==
The murder trial of Siti Aisyah and Đoàn Thị Hương began on 2 October 2017, at the High Court in Shah Alam, Selangor, Malaysia, with both pleading not guilty. Judge Datuk Azmi Ariffin was the presiding judge.

A Malaysian government chemist testified before the court that VX degradation products were found on the two women. The testimony was the first evidence to provide a link between the defendants and the VX nerve agent. Claims by North Korean authorities that Kim had died of a heart attack were disputed by pathologist Mohamad Shah Mahmood, who told the court there was no evidence of a heart attack on autopsy and that post-mortem toxicology reports showed VX was the sole cause of death. Under cross-examination by both defense lawyers, Mohamad, however, acknowledged he had limited knowledge of nerve agents in general and said he did not know the amount of the poison that was used.

Another chemical pathologist, Nur Ashikin Othman, told the court that Kim had very low blood levels of cholinesterase, the enzyme inhibited by anticholinesterase agents such as VX. She also stated that cholinesterase levels were within the normal range for both defendants, but that this did not rule out the possibility they had been in contact with VX. Tengku Ampuan Rahimah Hospital doctor Ranjini Sivaganabalan, a specialist in poisons, testified that VX may not be fatal in very low dosages and disagreed with an assertion that as little as 10 milligrams of VX would be lethal to humans, and claimed that a person with VX on their hands may not be fully decontaminated by washing it off with soap and water. Toxicologist K. Sharmilah testified that vials of atropine, a drug used as an antidote to poisoning with nerve agents such as VX, were found in Kim Jong-nam's bag. On 8 October, the trial had to be moved to a high-security laboratory due to the danger posed by the nerve agent-tainted clothing admitted into evidence.

Police investigator Wan Azirul identified four suspects in the CCTV images as Mr. Chang (identified as Hong Song-hac), Mr. Y (Rhi Ji-hyon), James (O Jong-gil), and Hanamori (a.k.a. "Grandpa" and "Uncle") (Ri Jae-nam). The men were not arrested because Malaysian police did not have sufficient information to identify or locate the suspects, according to investigating officer Wan Azirul and Deputy Public Prosecutor Wan Shaharuddin Wan Ladin.

When the trial resumed in January 2018, Justice Azmi Ariffin ruled that certain CCTV records could not be admitted as evidence. On 14 March, Hương's lawyer, Hisyam Teh Poh Teik, presented a recorded statement from Nguyễn Bích Thủy, a bar owner and Hương's friend, to the Vietnamese police on 1 March 2017, detailing how Hương was recruited by a man named as "Li" (identified as Rhi Ji-hyon). (Note: "Li" was the name that Rhi Ji-hyon introduced himself as to Thủy.) Through the statement, Thủy said:

Me and Hương used to work together as waitresses at the Seventeen Bar in Hanoi from 2014 to May 2016. On 27 December 2016, Li (Rhi Ji-hyon) came to the Hay Bar in Hanoi that was run by me and my husband. Li claimed he had a Korean father and Vietnamese mother and that he was married but divorced with no children. He offered me a job as an actress but I refused because I need to take care of my young son. Li then asked me to introduce him to one of her friends. I remembered Hương loved acting and contacted her. When Hương came by the bar to meet Li, I heard him telling Hương that his team was making prank videos at the airport and she was required to "dress nicely, pass by another person and pour a cup of liquid on his/her head".

During the cross examination, the defence lawyer also produced an affidavit Thủy had made the previous October that also contained her police statement. The Malaysian police lead investigator Wan Azirul then came under fire from the lawyer after he admitted not seeking out Thủy even though the accused (Hương) had mentioned her in her statement, with the lawyer said "In doing an investigation you are supposed to look for the truth, but your investigation is only focused on the CCTV footage. The truth is there (in Vietnam) but no one in Malaysia is interested". The lawyer also told that in November he had asked the Malaysian attorney general's office for assistance in convincing Thủy to travel to Malaysia to testify about her role in introducing Hương to the North Korean man. The request was however declined when another attorney representing Hương, Salim Bashir said "It's unfortunate that the attorney general declined to exercise his power to do this and in doing that deprived us of having the opportunity for police to go to Vietnam and investigate". Salim added that the fact that security videos showed Hương appeared to be touching her hair briefly after approaching Kim and going to a toilet farther away to wash her hands showed an "innocent mind" and not the conduct of someone who knew she had poison on her hand. According to lawyer Hisyam, Thủy also turned down efforts by Vietnamese police and defence lawyers to travel to Malaysia to testify for Hương, citing her responsibility in running her bar with her husband and taking care of her young child.

Meanwhile, on the Siti Aisyah side according to her lawyer Gooi Soon Seng, he slammed Malaysian investigators for not allowing him to meet Aisyah during her 14-day remand and not releasing portions of the video linked to the attack as well for the authorities failure to copy all the footage from the CCTV server of the airport which compromised the defence of Aisyah. The lawyer blamed the police for not publishing the entire incident of the video during the attack as it was seen during the trials that police had deliberately cut off the key moments of the killing from the video that the accused (Aisyah) was adjusting glasses after attacking the victim (to which the footage of Aisyah wearing sunglasses was dropped as evidence is not appropriate when police are trying to convict his client of murder). The lawyer adding that police has failed to investigate crucial evidence such as Aisyah's jeans and glasses that were not sent for lab tests. Based on a chemistry department test also showing that Aisyah's finger nail cuttings, nail swabs and blood found no traces of VX.

Both defence lawyers agreed that their clients did not know they were handling poison and made a scapegoat moreover with the absence of the four North Korean suspects. Through the trial from 20 March, Hisyam screened a video of CCTV recorded at Noi Bai International Airport on 2 February 2017, of her client playing a prank on a Vietnamese government official named Trịnh Ngọc Linh in Hanoi less than two weeks before the attack, which showed her approaching the man from behind and putting her arms around his neck. Another video screened by the lawyer showed Hương acting as the victim of pranks played by a Vietnamese filmmaker, Nguyễn Mạnh Quang (also known as Quang Bek). Through an affidavit made by Quang, Quang said he had hired Hương to act in the video, which was recorded in 2016. The lawyer then explained that "these videos explain why the accused identified herself as an actress" and questioned police investigator Wan Azirul if he "made some efforts to track Quang after receiving affidavits and ask if the task was important or that it was a waste of time" which was replied by "no efforts was made and agreeing to the latter question". The Malaysian police investigator, however, denied the blame that with the absence of four North Korean suspects their investigation had caused prejudice, insisting that "as for the case, the main perpetrators who committed the killing are the two accused", as well denying the accusation that Malaysian police did not take adequate measures to pursue the four men, stressing that Interpol had issued an alert for the four men to be arrested based on Malaysia's request. After being questioned by another Hương lawyer, Naran Singh, during the session hearing, the police investigator admitted there was a mistake in his investigation due to pressure from previous Malaysian police Chief, Khalid though Wan Azirul, still declining the claim that his investigation is controlled by his superior.

Closing arguments in the trial began on 27 June 2018. On 16 August, the Malaysian court has decided to continue the trial on 1 November until April 2019, with the judge saying that "a political assassination cannot be ruled out" although there was not enough evidence to say, adding that security camera footage "showed that they had the knowledge that the liquid on their hands was toxic and there was no hidden crew and no attempt to bring the person in on the joke afterward, as is common in reality TV prank shows". Both of the accused are then being called to enter their defense since the trial would take another few months before a final verdict is reached. On 1 September, the Malaysian police are tracking down two Indonesian women who are willing to testify on the case.

On 28 January 2019, the trial was postponed to March.

== Dismissal of murder charges ==
=== Release of Siti Aisyah ===
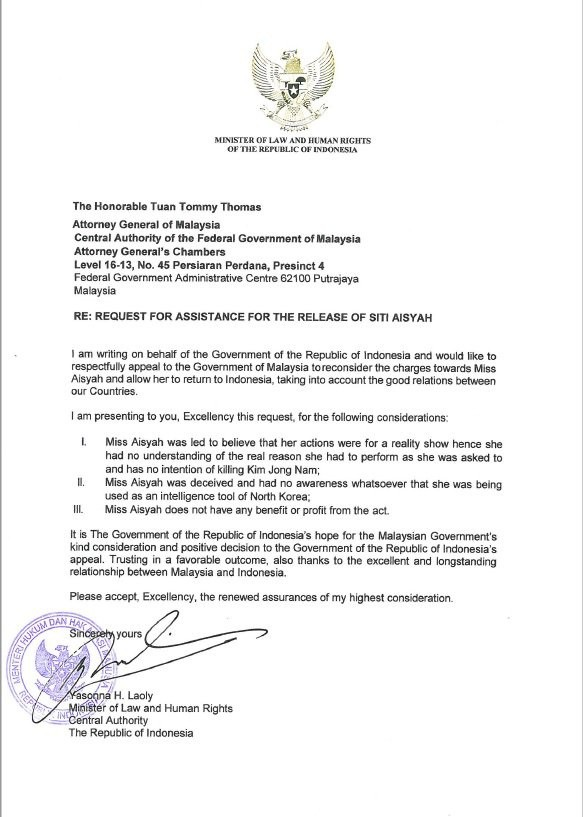
Request letter signed by Yasonna Laoly of Indonesian Ministry of Law and Human Rights delivered to Malaysian attorney general for Siti Aisyah's release

In March 2019, Siti Aisyah was released after her murder charge was dismissed. Both the Indonesian and Vietnamese media later revealed that her release was due to a request letter sent by the Indonesian government, which had received a response from Malaysian attorney general Tommy Thomas. This was later admitted by Thomas and confirmed by Reuters, though Thomas refused to respond to other media sources when asked to comment on the decision.

On 13 March, Minister in the Prime Minister's Department Liew Vui Keong further explained that the power to dismiss charges against any individual in Malaysia rests with the nation's attorney general as established in the constitution. Despite similar callings from the Vietnamese government to release Đoàn Thị Hương in the manner of the Indonesian suspect, Malaysian prosecutors rejected the request and said the trial would continue to proceed with a postponement until 1 April due to Hương's poor health and psychological condition—she had not slept for three nights following the Malaysian attorney general's decision to drop the charges against Aisyah.

==== Reactions ====
Hương's defence lawyers felt the Malaysian government was practicing discrimination in the judiciary system since the court previously stated that it found a prima facie case against both suspects but only released one. They provided reasons for doing so, such as "taking consideration of good relations between Indonesia and Malaysia thus agreed to the passage of nolle prosequi for Aisyah", as evidenced from the discovery of the hidden letter delivered by the attorney general of Malaysia to the Indonesian Ministry of Law and Human Rights as a response towards their appeal request. The Malaysian attorney general's different treatment towards the two suspects attracted criticism from Ramkarpal Singh, the Malaysian Member of Parliament for Bukit Gelugor. Ramkarpal felt that Thomas's refusal to withdraw the murder charge against the second suspect was "mind boggling and raises questions about the powers of attorney general in the country". He further stated:

I am of the view that the charge against Hương ought to have been dropped the same way it was dropped against Siti Aisyah, if the Attorney General (AG) was of the view that North Korea had a hand in Kim's murder. Subjecting Hương to further prosecution and not her co-accused, particularly when a prima facie case has been found against both, is, with respect, unprecedented and regrettable. Since both Hương and Siti Aisyah were charged together, Hương has a constitutional right to be treated the way Siti Aisyah was, as she is entitled to equal protection of the law. Hương would never know why she was treated differently from Siti Aisyah. If she is convicted, she will always wonder if Siti Aisyah was equally culpable. In cases like these, the discretion of the AG ought to be open to question, particularly when a person's life is at stake.

Vietnamese Foreign Affairs Ministry spokeswoman Lê Thị Thu Hằng regretted the Malaysian attorney general's decision and called for a fair trial on the case. Her statement was echoed by other Vietnamese ministers, including Foreign Minister Phạm Bình Minh, Deputy Foreign Minister Nguyễn Quốc Dũng, and Vietnamese ambassador to Malaysia Lê Quý Quỳnh. The release of Siti Aisyah "sparked anger in Malaysia", with sources suggesting that the release was a result of political lobbying and "diplomatic pressure" from the Indonesian government; Malaysian Prime Minister Mahathir Mohamad "denied that the Malaysian government caved in to diplomatic pressure", claiming that he had "no information" regarding the assassination and that the release was done based on the "rule of law".

Bridget Welsh, a Southeast Asia expert with John Cabot University, predicted that the decision will risk a "thorny bilateral problem with Vietnam if there is no similar treatment towards their citizen". Malaysian Chinese Association (MCA) President Wee Ka Siong expressed concern over possible meddling in the trial outcome. According to Wee, he had obtained a reply to his written question during a Parliament session in Malaysia, where Prime Minister Mahathir said that the attorney general could still follow his directive even though the attorney general had the discretion to decide on the timeline for criminal prosecution procedures. His statement was followed by MCA spokeswoman Chan Quin Er, who echoed Ramkarpal's statements and stressed that "Malaysian laws should not discriminate" and everyone "is equal before the law".

Outgoing Malaysian Bar president George Varughese expressed that "the Attorney General has the prerogative to drop charges", but "it would be good if the Attorney General could give his reasons for dropping the charges" to avoid speculation. Other Malaysian lawyers viewed the decision as discriminatory against Hương—not only in the sense of Malaysia's justice system, but also to the public (who mostly wanted a fair, transparent trial), as voiced by lawyer Nur Hannan Ishak.

=== Sentencing and release of Đoàn Thị Hương ===
On 1 April 2019, the murder charge against Hương was dropped, and she pleaded guilty to the lesser charge of "voluntarily causing hurt by dangerous weapons or means." She was sentenced to three years and four months in prison, but received a one-third reduction in her term, and was released on 3 May.

== See also ==
- North Korea's illicit activities
- List of assassinations
