= SAFA programme =

The Safety Assessment of Foreign Aircraft Programme (SAFA Programme) is a programme established by the European Civil Aviation Conference (ECAC). Within the SAFA programme, ramp inspections made by the regulatory authorities in the member states have a common format.

According to the Joint Aviation Authorities (JAA), if an inspection identifies significant irregularities, these will be taken up with the operator and the oversight authority. The inspectors in each member state can demand corrective action before allowing the aircraft to leave if the irregularities have an immediate impact on safety.

Data reported by the inspectors in each member state is stored centrally in a computerized database set up by the JAA. The database also holds supplementary information, for example lists of actions carried out by the air carrier after the inspections. Furthermore, the information in the database is reviewed and analyzed by the JAA regularly, and the member states are informed of any potential safety hazards which have been identified.

However, SAFA inspections only regarded as on-the-spot assessments and the organization stresses that inspections are not a substitute for proper regulatory oversight (which is required under the Chicago Convention) and are not a guarantee for the airworthiness of a particular aircraft.

From 2006, SAFA Programme is under the responsibility of the European Commission, supported by the European Aviation Safety Agency (EASA), regulated by different directives and regulations.

== Member states ==
ECAC member states include the following 42 states:
Albania, Armenia, Austria, Azerbaijan, Belgium, Bosnia and Herzegovina, Bulgaria, Croatia, Cyprus, Czech Republic, Denmark, Estonia, Finland, France, Germany, Greece, Hungary, Iceland, Ireland, Italy, Latvia, Lithuania, Luxembourg, Macedonia, Malta, Moldova, Monaco, the Netherlands, Norway, Poland, Portugal, Republic of Georgia, Romania, Serbia, Slovakia, Slovenia, Spain, Sweden, Switzerland, Turkey, Ukraine and the United Kingdom.

== See also ==
- European Aviation Safety Agency
- European Civil Aviation Conference
- Joint Aviation Authorities
- List of air carriers banned in the EU
